= List of marine molluscs of Montenegro =

Location of Montenegro

The marine molluscs of Montenegro are a part of the molluscan fauna of Montenegro (wildlife of Montenegro).

A number of species of marine molluscs are found in the wild in Montenegro.

Summary table of number of species

	Montenegro
polyplacophorans	3
marine gastropods	199 (198 + 1)
marine bivalves	131
scaphopods	5
cephalopods	17
marine molluscs altogether	355

There were recognized 354 marine species of molluscs in Montenegro in 2017.

== Polyplacophorans ==
Chitonidae

- Chiton corallinus (Risso, 1826)
- Chiton olivaceus Spengler, 1797

Acanthochitonidae

- Acanthochitona fascicularis (Linnaeus, 1767)

== Marine gastropods ==
Patellidae

- Patella caerulea (Linnaeus, 1758)
- Patella rustica (Linnaeus, 1758)
- Patella vulgata (Linnaeus, 1758)

Fissurellidae

- Diodora gibberula (Lamarck, 1822)
- Diodora graeca (Linnaeus, 1758)
- Diodora italica (Defrance, 1820)
- Emarginula huzardii Payraudeau, 1826
- Emarginula fissura (Linnaeus, 1758)
- Emarginula octaviana Coen, 1939
- Puncturella noachina (Linnaeus, 1771)

Haliotidae

- Haliotis tuberculata Linnaeus, 1758

Trochidae

- Clanculus corallinus (Gmelin, 1791)
- Clanculus cruciatus (Linnaeus, 1758)
- Clelandella miliaris (Brocchi, 1814)
- Gibbula umbilicaris (Linnaeus, 1758)
- Gibbula adriatica (Philippi, 1844)
- Gibbula albida (Gmelin, 1791)
- Gibbula divaricata (Linnaeus, 1758)
- Gibbula drepanensis (Brugnone, 1873)
- Gibbula fanulum (Gmelin, 1791)
- Gibbula guttadauri (Philippi, 1836)
- Gibbula magus (Linnaeus, 1758)
- Gibbula philberti (Récluz, 1843)
- Gibbula rarilineata (Michaud, 1829)
- Gibbula varia (Linnaeus, 1758)
- Phorcus richardi (Payraudeau, 1826)
- Jujubinus exasperatus (Pennant, 1777)
- Jujubinus striatus (Linnaeus, 1758)
- Phorcus articulatus (Lamarck, 1822)
- Phorcus mutabilis (Philippi, 1846)
- Phorcus turbinatus (Born, 1778)

Calliostomatidae

- Calliostoma conulus (Linnaeus, 1758)
- Calliostoma laugieri (Payraudeau, 1826)
- Calliostoma zizyphinum (Linnaeus, 1758)

Turbinidae

- Bolma rugosa (Linnaeus, 1767)

Phasianellidae

- Tricolia pullus (Linnaeus, 1758)

Colloniidae

- Homalopoma sanguineum (Linnaeus, 1758)

Neritidae

- Smaragdia viridis (Linnaeus, 1758)

Cerithiidae

- Bittium latreillii (Payraudeau, 1826)
- Bittium reticulatum (da Costa, 1778)
- Bittium submamillatum (de Rayneval & Ponzi, 1854)
- Cerithium vulgatum Bruguière, 1792

Turritellidae

- Turritella communis (Risso, 1826)
- Turritella turbona (Monterosato, 1877)

Triphoridae

- Monophorus perversus (Linnaeus, 1758)
- Marshallora adversa (Montagu, 1803)
- Metaxia metaxa (Delle Chiaje, 1828)
- Strobiligera brychia (Bouchet & Guillemot, 1978)

Cerithiopsidae

- Cerithiopsis jeffreysi (Watson, 1885)

Epitoniidae

- Epitonium clathrus (Linnaeus, 1758)
- Epitonium muricatum (Risso, 1826)
- Epitonium turtonis (Turton, 1819)

Eulimidae

- Eulima glabra (da Costa, 1778)
- Melanella alba (da Costa, 1778)
- Melanella compactilis (Locard, 1892)

Littorinidae

- Melarhaphe neritoides (Linnaeus, 1758)

Rissoidae

- Alvania cancellata (da Costa, 1778)
- Alvania lineata (Risso, 1826)
- Alvania cimex (Linnaeus, 1758)
- Alvania cimicoides (Forbes, 1844)
- Alvania hispidula (Monterosato, 1884)
- Peringiella elegans (Locard, 1892)
- Pusillina marginata (Michaud, 1830)
- Rissoa guerinii (Récluz, 1843)
- Rissoa membranacea (Adams J., 1800)
- Rissoa monodonta (Philippi, 1836)
- Rissoa parva (da Costa, 1778)
- Rissoa splendida (Eichwald, 1830)
- Setia ambigua (Brugnone, 1873)

Caecidae

- Caecum trachea (Montagu, 1803)
- Parastrophia asturiana de Folin, 1870

Hydrobiidae

- Peringia ulvae (Pennant, 1777)

Iravadiidae

- Hyala vitrea (Montagu, 1803)

Tornidae

- Circulus striatus (Philippi, 1836)

Vermetidae

- Thylacodes arenarius (Linnaeus, 1758)
- Petaloconchus glomeratus (Linnaeus, 1758)

Aporrhaidae

- Aporrhais pespelecani (Linnaeus, 1758)

Calyptraeidae

- Calyptraea chinensis (Linnaeus, 1758)
- Crepidula moulinsii (Michaud, 1829)

Capulidae

- Capulus ungaricus (Linnaeus, 1758)

Triviidae

- Trivia multilirata (Sowerby, G. B. II, 1870)

Cypraeidae

- Luria lurida (Linnaeus, 1758)
- Zonaria pyrum (Gmelin, 1791)
- Erosaria spurca (Linnaeus, 1758)

Ovulidae

- Pseudosimnia adriatica (Sowerby, G. B. II, 1870)

Naticidae

- Euspira macilenta (Philippi, 1844)
- Euspira nitida (Donovan, 1804)
- Natica hebraea (Martyn, 1786)
- Euspira catena (da Costa, 1778)
- Euspira intricata (Donovan, 1804)
- Notocochlis dillwynii (Payraudeau, 1826)
- Neverita josephinia (Risso, 1826)
- Natica stercusmuscarum (Gmelin, 1791)

Tonnidae

- Tonna galea (Linnaeus, 1758)

Ranellidae

- Cabestana cutacea (Linnaeus, 1767)

Cassidae

- Galeodea echinophora (Linnaeus, 1758)

Muricidae

- Bolinus brandaris (Linnaeus, 1758)
- Coralliophila squamosa (Bivona Ant. in Bivona And., 1838)
- Hexaplex trunculus (Linnaeus, 1758)
- Muricopsis cristata (Brocchi, 1814)
- Ocenebra erinaceus (Linnaeus, 1758)
- Stramonita haemastoma (Linnaeus, 1767)

Marginellidae

- Granulina marginata (Bivona Ant., 1832)

Costellariidae

- Vexillum tricolor (Gmelin, 1791)
- Vexillum luculentum (Reeve, 1845)
- Vexillum acuminatum (Gmelin, 1791)

Buccinidae

- Euthria cornea (Linnaeus, 1758)
- Pollia dorbignyi (Payraudeau, 1826)
- Pisania striata (Gmelin, 1791)

Nassariidae

- Cyclope neritea (Linnaeus, 1758)
- Nassarius corniculum (Olivi, 1792)
- Nassarius cuvierii (Payraudeau, 1826)
- Nassarius mutabilis (Linnaeus, 1758)
- Nassarius pygmaeus (Lamarck, 1822)
- Nassarius reticulatus (Linnaeus, 1758)
- Nassarius incrassatus (Strøm, 1768)

Columbellidae

- Columbella rustica (Linnaeus, 1758)
- Mitrella scripta (Linnaeus, 1758)

Fasciolariidae

- Fusinus pulchellus (Philippi, 1840)
- Fusinus rostratus (Olivi, 1792)
- Fusinus parvulus (Monterosato, 1884)
- Fusinus syracusanus (Linnaeus, 1758)
- Tarantinaea lignaria (Linnaeus, 1758)

Conidae

- Conus ventricosus Gmelin, 1791

Horaiclavidae

- Haedropleura septangularis (Montagu, 1803)

Mangeliidae

- Bela brachystoma (Philippi, 1844)
- Bela taprurensis (Pallary, 1904)
- Mangelia attenuata (Montagu, 1803)
- Mangelia costulata Risso, 1826
- Mangelia striolata Risso, 1826
- Mangelia scabrida Monterosato, 1890
- Mangelia stosiciana Brusina, 1869
- Mangelia unifasciata (Deshayes, 1835)

Raphitomidae

- Raphitoma aequalis (Jeffreys, 1867)
- Raphitoma philberti (Michaud, 1829)
- Raphitoma purpurea (Montagu, 1803)
- Raphitoma echinata (Brocchi, 1814)
- Raphitoma cordieri (Payraudeau, 1826)

Mathildidae

- Mathilda quadricarinata (Brocchi, 1814)

Pyramidellidae

- Eulimella acicula (Philippi, 1836)
- Eulimella scillae (Scacchi, 1835)
- Megastomia conoidea (Brocchi, 1814)
- Turbonilla delicata (Monterosato, 1874)
- Turbonilla gradata (Bucquoy, Dautzenberg & Dollfus, 1883)
- Turbonilla lactea (Linnaeus, 1758)
- Turbonilla pusilla (Philippi, 1844)

Acteonidae

- Acteon tornatilis (Linnaeus, 1758)

Ringiculidae

- Ringicula auriculata (Ménard de la Groye, 1811)
- Ringicula conformis (Monterosato, 1877)
- Ringicula gianninii Nordsieck, 1974

Bullidae

- Bulla striata (Bruguière, 1792)

Haminoeidae

- Haminoea hydatis (Linnaeus, 1758)
- Haminoea navicula (da Costa, 1778)
- Weinkauffia turgidula (Forbes, 1844)

Philinidae

- Philine quadripartita Ascanius, 1772
- Philine scabra (O. F. Müller, 1784)

Cylichnidae

- Cylichna cylindracea (Pennant, 1777)

Retusidae

- Volvulella acuminata (Bruguière, 1792)

Plakobranchidae

- Elysia timida (Risso, 1818)
- Thuridilla hopei (Vérany, 1853)

Umbraculidae

- Umbraculum umbraculum (Lightfoot, 1786)

Tylodinidae

- Tylodina perversa (Gmelin, 1791)

Akeridae

- Akera bullata O. F. Müller, 1776

Aplysiidae

- Aplysia depilans (Gmelin, 1791)
- Aplysia dactylomela (Rang, 1828)
- Aplysia fasciata Poiret, 1789
- Bursatella leachii de Blainville, 1817

Dorididae

- Doris bertheloti (d'Orbigny, 1839)

Discodorididae

- Atagema rugosa Pruvot-Fol, 1951
- Baptodoris cinnabarina Bergh, 1884
- Geitodoris portmanni (Schmekel, 1972)
- Discodoris erubescens Bergh 1884
- Platydoris argo (Linnaeus, 1767)
- Peltodoris atromaculata (Bergh, 1880)

Chromodorididae

- Felimare orsinii (Vérany, 1864)
- Felimare picta (Schultz in Philippi, 1836)
- Felimare tricolor (Cantraine, 1835)
- Felimida krohni (Vérany, 1846)
- Felimida luteorosea (Rapp, 1827)

Phyllidiidae

- Phyllidia flava (Aradas, 1847)

Dendrodorididae

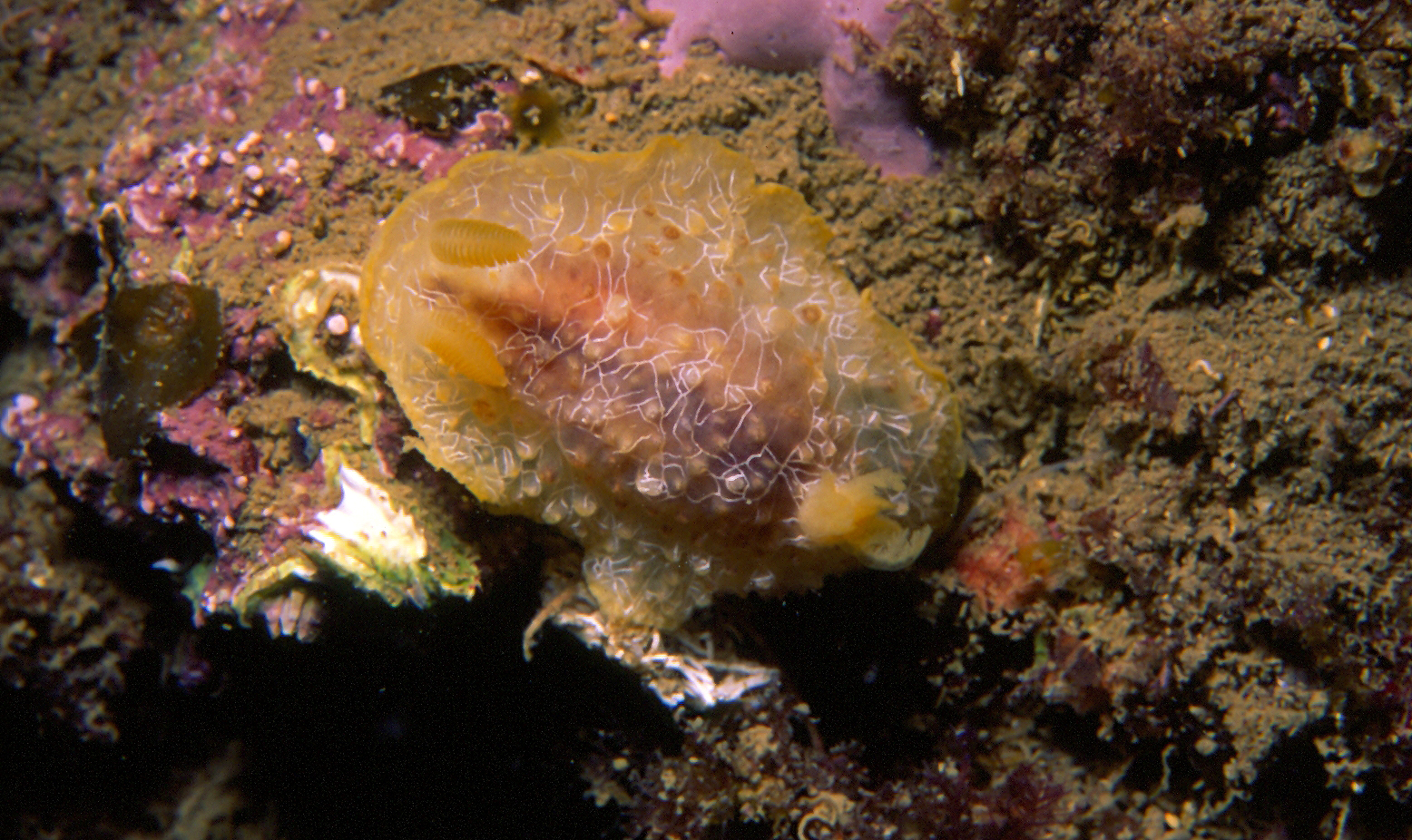
Doriopsilla areolata

- Doriopsilla areolata Bergh, 1880

Polyceridae

- Thecacera pennigera (Montagu, 1813)

Calycidorididae

- Diaphorodoris papillata Portmann & Sandmeier, 1960

Tritoniidae

- Tritonia nilsodhneri (Marcus Ev., 1983)

Tethydidae

- Melibe viridis Kelaart 1858
- Tethys fimbria Linnaeus, 1767

Proctonotidae

- Janolus cristatus (Delle Chiaje, 1841)

Facelinidae

- Cratena peregrina (Gmelin, 1791)
- Dicata odhneri (Schmekel, 1967)
- Dondice banyulensis Portmann & Sandmeier, 1960
- Facelina fusca Schmekel, 1966

Flabellinidae

- Flabellina affinis (Gmelin, 1791)
- Flabellina babai Schmekel, 1972
- Flabellina ischitana (Hirano & Thompson, 1990)
- Flabellina iodinea (J. G. Cooper, 1863)
- Flabellina pedata (Montagu, 1816)

Rissoellidae

- Rissoella diaphana (Alder, 1848)

Rissoinidae

- Rissoina bruguieri (Payraudeau, 1826)

== Marine bivalves ==
Nuculidae

- Nucula nitidosa (Winckworth, 1930)
- Nucula nucleus (Linnaeus, 1758)
- Nucula sulcata (Bronn, 1831)

Nuculanidae

- Nuculana pella (Linnaeus, 1767)
- Saccella commutata (Philippi, 1844)

Arcidae

- Acar gradata (Broderip & Sowerby, G. B. I 1829)
- Anadara polii (Mayer, 1868)
- Anadara transversa (Say, 1822)
- Arca noae (Linnaeus, 1758)
- Arca tetragona (Poli, 1795)
- Barbatia barbata (Linnaeus, 1758)

Noetiidae

- Striarca lactea (Linnaeus, 1758)

Glycymerididae

- Glycymeris glycymeris (Linnaeus, 1758)
- Glycymeris bimaculata (Poli, 1795)
- Glycymeris nummaria (Linnaeus, 1758)

Mytilidae

- Dacrydium vitreum (Møller, 1842)
- Modiolus barbatus (Linnaeus, 1758)
- Lithophaga lithophaga (Linnaeus, 1758)
- Musculus discors (Linnaeus, 1767)
- Mytilaster lineatus (Gmelin, 1791)
- Mytilaster minimus (Poli, 1795)
- Mytilus galloprovincialis (Lamarck, 1819)
- Mytilus edulis (Linnaeus, 1758)
- Arcuatula senhousia (Benson in Cantor, 1842)
- Gibbomodiola adriatica (Lamarck, 1819)

Pinnidae

- Pinna nobilis (Linnaeus, 1758)
- Atrina fragilis (Pennant, 1777)

Pteriidae

- Pteria hirundo (Linnaeus, 1758)

Pectinidae

- Aequipecten opercularis (Linnaeus, 1758)
- Manupecten pesfelis (Linnaeus, 1758)
- Flexopecten glaber (Linnaeus, 1758)
- Pecten jacobeus (Linnaeus, 1758)
- Pecten maximus (Linnaeus, 1758)
- Pseudamussium sulcatum (Müller O. F., 1776)
- Talochlamys multistriata (Poli, 1795)
- Mimachlamys varia (Linnaeus, 1758)

Spondylidae

- Spondylus gaederopus (Linnaeus, 1758)

Anomiidae

- Anomia ephippium (Linnaeus, 1758)
- Heteranomia squamula (Linnaeus, 1758)
- Monia patelliformis (Linnaeus, 1761)

Limidae

- Lima lima (Linnaeus, 1758)
- Limaria hians (Gmelin, 1791)

Ostreidae

- Ostrea edulis Linnaeus, 1758
- Ostrea stentina (Payraudeau, 1826)

Lucinidae

- Anodontia fragilis (Philippi, 1836)
- Ctena decussata (Costa O.G., 1829)
- Myrtea spinifera (Montagu, 1803)
- Loripes lucinalis (Lamarck, 1818)
- Lucinella divaricata (Linnaeus, 1758)
- Lucinoma borealis (Linnaeus, 1767)

Thyasiridae

- Thyasira flexuosa (Montagu, 1803)

Ungulinidae

- Diplodonta brocchii (Deshayes, 1850)
- Diplodonta rotundata (Montagu, 1803)

Chamidae

- Chama circinata (di Monterosato, 1878)
- Chama gryphoides (Linnaeus, 1758)

Lasaeidae

- Lepton squamosum (Montagu, 1803)

Montacutidae

- Kurtiella bidentata (Montagu, 1803)

Sportellidae

- Sportella recondita (Fischer P. in de Folin, 1872)

Cardiidae

- Acanthocardia echinata (Linnaeus, 1758)
- Acanthocardia deshayesii (Payraudeau, 1826)
- Acanthocardia paucicostata (Sowerby G. B. II, 1834)
- Acanthocardia tuberculata (Linnaeus, 1758)
- Cerastoderma glaucum (Bruguière, 1789)
- Laevicardium oblongum (Gmelin, 1791)
- Papillicardium papillosum (Poli, 1791)
- Parvicardium exiguum (Gmelin, 1791)
- Parvicardium minimum (Philippi, 1836)
- Parvicardium scabrum (Philippi, 1844)

Mactridae

- Mactra glauca (Born, 1778)
- Mactra stultorum (Linnaeus, 1758)
- Spisula subtruncata (da Costa, 1778)

Mesodesmatidae

- Donacilla cornea (Poli, 1791)

Tellinidae

- Arcopagia balaustina (Linnaeus, 1758)
- Arcopagia crassa (Pennant, 1777)
- Gastrana fragilis (Linnaeus, 1767)
- Tellina distorta Poli, 1791
- Tellina donacina Linnaeus, 1758
- Tellina pulchella (Lamarck, 1818)
- Tellina serrata (Brocchi, 1814)
- Tellina tenuis (da Costa, 1778)

Donacidae

- Donax semistriatus Poli, 1791
- Donax trunculus Linnaeus, 1758

Psammobiidae

- Gari fervensis (Gmelin, 1791)
- Gari depressa (Pennant, 1777)
- Gari tellinella (Lamarck, 1818)

Semelidae

- Abra alba (Wood. W., 1802)
- Abra nitida (Müller O. F., 1776)
- Abra prismatica (Montagu, 1808)
- Abra segmentum (Récluz, 1843)
- Scrobicularia cottardii (Payraudeau, 1826)
- Scrobicularia plana (da Costa, 1778)

Solecurtidae

- Azorinus chamasolen (da Costa, 1778)
- Solecurtus candidus (Brocchi, 1814)

Trapeziidae

- Coralliophaga lithophagella (Lamarck, 1819)

Glossidae

- Glossus humanus (Linnaeus, 1758)

Veneridae

- Callista chione (Linnaeus, 1758)
- Chamelea gallina (Linnaeus, 1758)
- Clausinella fasciata (da Costa, 1778)
- Dosinia lupinus (Linnaeus, 1758)
- Dosinia exoleta (Linnaeus, 1758)
- Gouldia minima (Montagu, 1803)
- Irus irus (Linnaeus, 1758)
- Mysia undata (Pennant, 1777)
- Petricola lithophaga (Retzius, 1788)
- Pitar rudis (Poli, 1795)
- Polititapes aureus (Gmelin, 1791)
- Ruditapes philippinarum (Adams & Reeve, 1850)
- Ruditapes decussatus (Linnaeus, 1758)
- Timoclea ovata (Pennant, 1777)
- Venus verrucosa Linnaeus, 1758
- Venus casina Linnaeus, 1758

Corbulidae

- Corbula gibba (Olivi, 1792)

Teredinidae

- Teredo navalis (Linnaeus, 1758)

Gastrochaenidae

- Gastrochaena dubia (Pennant, 1777)

Solenidae

- Solen marginatus (Pulteney, 1799)

Pharidae

- Ensis siliqua (Linnaeus, 1758)
- Ensis ensis (Linnaeus, 1758)
- Ensis minor (Chenu, 1843)
- Pharus legumen (Linnaeus, 1767)
- Phaxas pellucidus (Pennant, 1777)

Hiatellidae

- Hiatella arctica (Linnaeus, 1767)
- Hiatella rugosa (Linnaeus, 1767)
- Saxicavella jeffreysi (Winckworth, 1930)

Thraciidae

- Thracia corbuloidea de Blainville, 1827
- Thracia gracilis Jeffreys, 1865
- Thracia phaseolina (Lamarck, 1818)
- Thracia pubescens (Pulteney, 1799)

Pandoridae

- Pandora pinna (Montagu, 1803)

Poromyidae

- Poromya granulata (Nyst & Westendorp, 1839)

Cuspidariidae

- Cuspidaria cuspidata (Olivi, 1792)
- Cuspidaria rostrata (Spengler, 1793)

== Scaphopods ==
Dentaliidae

- Antalis dentalis (Linnaeus, 1758)
- Antalis vulgaris (da Costa, 1778)
- Antalis inaequicostata (Dautzenberg, 1891)

Fustiariidae

- Fustiaria rubescens (Deshayes, 1825)

Gadilidae

- Dischides politus (S. Wood, 1842)

== Cephalopods ==
Sepiidae

- Sepia elegans Blainville, 1827
- Sepia officinalis (Linnaeus, 1758)
- Sepia orbignyana (Férussac, 1826)

Sepiolidae

- Rossia macrosoma (Delle Chiaje, 1830)
- Sepietta oweniana (d'Orbigny, 1841)
- Sepiola rondeletii Leach, 1817

Loliginidae

- Alloteuthis media (Linnaeus, 1758)
- Loligo vulgaris (Lamarck, 1798)

Ommastrephidae

- Illex coindetii (Vérany, 1839)
- Todarodes sagittatus (Lamarck, 1798)

Octopodidae

- Eledone cirrhosa (Lamarck, 1798)
- Eledone moschata (Lamarck, 1798)
- Octopus salutii (Vérany, 1836)
- Octopus vulgaris (Cuvier, 1797)
- Pteroctopus tetracirrhus (Delle Chiaje, 1830)
- Scaeurgus unicirrhus (Delle Chiaje [in de Férussac & d'Orbigny], 1841)

Argonautidae

- Argonauta argo (Linnaeus, 1758)

== See also ==
- List of non-marine molluscs of Montenegro

Lists of molluscs of surrounding countries:

- List of marine molluscs of Albania
- List of marine molluscs of Croatia
- List of marine molluscs of Bosnia and Herzegovina (quite close)
- List of marine molluscs of Italy (marine border)
