= Outline of gastropods =

Overview of and topical guide to gastropods

This outline is provided as an overview of, and organized list of articles relevant to, the subject of gastropods (snails and slugs):

Gastropod – any member of the class Gastropoda, which includes slugs and snails.

== What type of things are gastropods? ==
Gastropods can be considered to be, or viewed as, the following:

- Natural resource
  - Organisms
    - Animals –
      - Invertebrates
        - Molluscs
    - Seafood

== Types of gastropods ==
- marine gastropod
  - sea snail
  - sea slug
- non-marine gastropod
  - freshwater gastropod = all are freshwater snails (with very few exceptions)
    - freshwater snail
  - terrestrial gastropod = terrestrial mollusc
    - land snail
    - land slug
    - semi-slug

== Taxonomy ==
- Taxonomy of the Gastropoda (Ponder & Lindberg, 1997)
- Taxonomy of the Gastropoda (Bouchet & Rocroi, 2005)
- Changes in the taxonomy of gastropods since 2005
- List of gastropods described in the 2000s
- List of gastropods described in 2010
- List of gastropods described in 2011
- List of gastropods described in 2012 - 2012 in molluscan paleontology#Newly named gastropods
- List of gastropods described in 2013 - 2013 in paleomalacology#Gastropods
- List of gastropods described in 2014 - 2014 in molluscan paleontology#Newly named gastropods
- List of gastropods described in 2015 - 2015 in molluscan paleontology#Gastropods
- List of gastropods described in 2016 - 2016 in molluscan paleontology#Gastropods
- List of gastropods described in 2017 - 2017 in paleomalacology#Gastropods

== Biology of gastropods ==
- malacology
  - conchology
- malacologist – List of malacologists

== Gastropod anatomy ==
- mollusc shell, seashell
  - gastropod shell, conch, conch (instrument)
    - protoconch
    - apex (mollusc)
    - spire (mollusc)
      - planispiral
      - sculpture (mollusc)
        - lira (mollusc)
        - varix (mollusc)
    - columella (gastropod)
    - aperture (mollusc)
      - lip (gastropod)
      - anal sulcus
      - mentum
      - parietal callus
      - plait (gastropod)
      - siphonal canal
      - siphonal notch
      - stromboid notch
    - umbilicus (mollusc)
      - callus (mollusc)
    - periostracum
    - selenizone
    - clausilium
    - operculum (gastropod)
    - epiphragm
- mantle (mollusc) and mantle cavity
- body wall
  - propodium
  - caudal mucous pit
  - nidamental gland
  - Parapodium#Gastropod parapodia
  - Semper's organ
  - suprapedal gland
  - snail slime
- sensory organs of gastropods
  - caryophyllidia
  - Hancock's organ
  - osphradium
  - rhinophore
- nervous system of gastropods
  - euthyneury
  - streptoneury
  - torsion (gastropod)
- digestive system of gastropods
  - proboscis#Gastropods
  - radula
  - odontophore
  - hepatopancreas = digestive gland
    - diverticulum (mollusc)
  - style (zoology)
- Respiratory system of gastropods
  - ctenidium (mollusc)
  - cerata
    - cnidosac
  - pneumostome
  - siphon (mollusc)
- circulatory system of gastropods
- excretory system of gastropods
  - pseudofeces
- reproductive system of gastropods
  - apophallation
  - Love dart
  - number of other genital structures: reproductive system of gastropods#Genital structures

== Life cycle ==
- mating of gastropods
- trochophore
- veliger
- estivation
- hibernation

== Gastropods according to conservation status ==
- List of recently extinct molluscs#Gastropods
- List of extinct in the wild animals#Molluscs
- List of critically endangered molluscs#Gastropods
- List of endangered molluscs#Gastropods
- List of vulnerable molluscs#Gastropods
- List of near threatened molluscs#Gastropods
- List of least concern molluscs#Gastropods
- List of data deficient molluscs#Gastropods

== Gastropods as a resource ==
- List of edible molluscs
- heliciculture
- Pest (organism)#Gastropod molluscs

== Biogeography of gastropods ==
- biogeography of gastropods

== Lists of marine molluscs by country ==
- List of marine molluscs of Angola
- List of marine molluscs of Australia
- List of marine molluscs of Brazil
- List of marine molluscs of Chile
- List of marine molluscs of Croatia
- (List of marine molluscs of Ireland)
  - List of marine molluscs of Ireland (Gastropoda)
    - List of Nudibranchia of Ireland
- List of marine molluscs of Montenegro
- List of marine molluscs of Mozambique
- List of marine molluscs of New Zealand
- List of marine molluscs of Slovenia
- (List of marine molluscs of South Africa)
  - List of marine gastropods of South Africa
    - List of marine heterobranch gastropods of South Africa
- List of marine molluscs of Sri Lanka
- List of marine molluscs of Venezuela

== Terms ==
- Glossary of gastropod terms
