= List of marine molluscs of Slovenia =

Location of Slovenia

The marine molluscs of Slovenia are a part of the molluscan fauna of Slovenia (wildlife of Slovenia). A number of species of marine molluscs are found in the wild in Slovenia.

Lipej et al. reported 70 species of opisthobranchs from Slovenia in 2012. Zenetos et al. reported 74 species of opisthobranchs from Slovenia in 2016.

Summary table of number of species

	Slovenia
polyplacophorans	??
marine gastropods	74 species of opisthobranchs
marine bivalves	??
scaphopods	??
cephalopods	??
marine molluscs altogether	??

== Marine gastropods ==
Acteonidae

- Acteon tornatilis (Linnaeus, 1758)

Ringiculidae

- Ringicula auriculata (Ménard de la Groye, 1811)

Bullidae

- Bulla striata Bruguière, 1792

Haminoeidae

- Haminoea hydatis (Linnaeus, 1758)
- Haminoea navicula (da Costa, 1778)
- Atys jeffreysi (Weinkauff, 1866)
- Weinkauffia turgidula (Forbes, 1844)

Philinidae

- Philine catena (Montagu, 1803)
- Philine quadripartita Ascanius, 1772 - It was listed as Philine aperta (Linnaeus, 1767) by Lipej et al. in 2008. However Philine aperta (Linnaeus, 1767) sensu Jeffreys, 1867 is a synonym of Philine quadripartita because of misidentification.

Aglajidae

- Philinopsis depicta (Renier, 1807)

Cylichnidae

- Cylichna cylindracea (Pennant, 1777)

Scaphandridae

- Scaphander lignarius (Linnaeus, 1758)

Retusidae

- Retusa laevisculpta (Granata-Grillo, 1877)
- Retusa mammillata (Philippi, 1836)
- Retusa multiquadrata Oberling, 1970 - nomen dubium
- Retusa truncatula (Bruguière, 1792)
- Retusa umbilicata (Montagu, 1803)

Rhizoridae

- Volvulella acuminata (Bruguière, 1792)

Runcinidae

- Runcina adriatica T. Thompson, 1980

Creseidae

- Creseis clava Rang, 1828

Plakobranchidae

- Elysia gordanae Thompson & Jaklin, 1988
- Elysia timida (Risso, 1818)
- Elysia viridis (Montagu, 1804)
- Thuridilla hopei (Vérany, 1853)

Boselliidae

- Bosellia mimetica Trinchese, 1891

Limapontiidae

- Calliopaea bellula d’Orbigny, 1837
- Ercolania coerulea Trinchese, 1892

Tylodinidae

- Tylodina perversa (Gmelin, 1791)

Akeridae

- Akera bullata O. F. Müller, 1776

Aplysiidae

- Aplysia depilans Gmelin, 1791
- Aplysia fasciata Poiret, 1789
- Aplysia punctata (Cuvier, 1803)
- Bursatella leachii Blainville, 1817

Pleurobranchidae

- Berthella ocellata (delle Chiaje, 1830)
- Berthella stellata (Risso, 1826)
- Pleurobranchaea meckeli (Blainville, 1825)

Dorididae

- Doris bertheloti (d’Orbigny, 1839)
- Doris pseudoargus Rapp, 1827

Discodorididae

- Geitodoris planata (Alder & Hancock, 1846)
- Jorunna tomentosa (Cuvier, 1804)
- Platydoris argo (Linnaeus, 1767)
- Rostanga rosi (Ortea, 1979)
- Rostanga rubra (Risso, 1818)
- Thordisa filix Pruvot-Fol, 1951

Chromodorididae

- Felimare orsinii (Vérany, 1846)
- Felimare tricolor (Cantraine, 1835)
- Felimare villafranca (Risso, 1818)
- Felimida krohni (Vérany, 1846)
- Felimida luteorosea (Rapp, 1827)
- Felimida purpurea (Risso in Guérin, 1831)

Dendrodorididae

- Dendrodoris grandiflora (Rapp, 1827)
- Dendrodoris limbata (Cuvier, 1804)

Onchidorididae

- Onchidoris neapolitana (delle Chiaje, 1841)

Goniodorididae

- ...

Proctonotidae

- Janolus cristatus (Delle Chiaje, 1841)

Eubranchidae

- Eubranchus tricolor Forbes, 1838

Facelinidae

- Dicata odhneri Schmekel, 1967

Flabellinidae

- Cumanotus beaumonti (Eliot, 1906)

Species removed from the faunal list:

- Retusa obtusa (Montagu, 1803) - It was listed from Slovenia by De Min & Vio in 1997, probably based on misidentification. It is not listed by other authors.

== See also ==
- List of non-marine molluscs of Slovenia

Lists of molluscs of surrounding countries:

- List of marine molluscs of Croatia
- List of marine molluscs of Italy
