= Glossary of gastropod terms =

The following is a glossary of common English language and scientific terms used in the description of gastropods.

- Abapical – away from the apex of a shell toward the base
- Acephalous – Headless.
- Acinose – Full of small bulgings; resembling the kernel in a nut.
- Aculeate – Very sharply pointed, as the teeth on the radula of some snails.
- Acuminate – gradually tapering to a point, as the spire of some shells.
- Acute – Sharp or pointed, as the spire of a shell, or the lip of a shell.
- Adapical – toward the apex of a shell (↔ abapical)
- Admedian – Next to the central object, as the lateral teeth on the lingual membrane.
- Adpressed – with overlapping whorls or with a suture tightly pressed to the previous whorl (preferred to the term appressed)
- Afferent – To bring in; when relating to a vessel or duct, indicating that it brings in its contents.
- Amoeboid – Shaped like an amoeba, a small animalcule.
- Amorphous – Without distinct form.
- Amphibious – Inhabiting both land and water.
- Amphidetic – With the ligament on both sides of the umbones.
- Anal canal – Tubular of gutter-like opening in the shell of a gastropod through which excrements are expelled (see also: siphonal canal)
- Analogue – A likeness between two objects when otherwise they are totally different, as the wing of a bird and the wing of a butterfly.
- Anastomosing – Coming together.
- Annular – Made up of rings.
- Anterior – The front or fore end.
- Aquatic – Inhabiting the water.
- Arborescent – Branching like a tree.
- Arched – Bowed or bent in a curve.
- Arcti-spiral – Tightly coiled, as some spiral shells.
- Asphyxiating – Causing suspended animation; apparent death.
- Assimilation – Act of converting one substance into another, as the changing of food-stuffs into living bodies.
- Asymmetrical – Not symmetrical.
- Atrium
- Atrophied – Wasted away.
- Attenuate – Long and slender, as in some shells.
- Auditory – Connected with the hearing.
- Auricled – Eared, or with ear-like appendages.
- Basal – The bottom or lower part.
- Biangulate – With two angles.
- Bicuspid or bicuspidate – Having two cusps.
- Bifid – Having two arms or prongs.
- Bifurcated – Having two branches.
- Bilateral – With two sides.
- Bilobed – With two lobes.
- Blood sinus
- Bulbous – Swollen.
- Calcareous – Composed of carbonate of lime.
- Callosity – A hardened and raised bunch, as the callus on the columella of some shells.
- Callus – A deposit of shelly matter.
- Campanulate – Formed like a bell.
- Canaliculate – Resembling a canal, as the deep sutures in some shells.
- Cancellated – Formed of cross-bars, as the longitudinal and spiral lines which cross in some shells.
- Cardiac pouch – Containing the heart and placed near the umb'ones of the shell.
- Carinate – Keeled. With keel.
- Cartilaginous – Like cartilage.
- Caudal – Tail-like, or with a tail-like appendage.
- Cellular – Made up of cells.
- Cerebral – Pertaining to the brain.
- Channeled – Grooved or formed like a channel.
- Chitinous – Formed of chitin, as the radulas of gastropods.
- Ciliary – By means of cilia.
- Ciliated – Having cilia.
- Cilium (plural cilia) – A lash; used to designate the hairs on the mantle, gills, etc.
- Clavate – Club-shaped.
- Coarctate – Pressed together, narrowed.
- Concave – Excavated, hollowed out.
- Conchiolin
- Conic – Shaped like a cone.
- Connective – A part connecting two other parts, as a muscle connecting two parts of the body, or a nerve connecting two ganglia.
- Constricted – Narrowed.
- Contractile – Capable of being contracted or drawn in, as the tentacle of a snail.
- Convex – Bulged out, as the whorls of some snails.
- Convoluted – Rolled together.
- Cordate – Heart-shaped.
- Corneous – Horn-like, as the opercula of some gastropods.
- Corrugated – Roughened by wrinkles.
- Costate – Having rib-like ridges.
- Crenulate – Wrinkled on the edges.
- Crescentic – Like a crescent.
- Cylindrical – Like a cylinder.
- Decollated – Cut off, as the apex of some shells.
- Decussated – With spiral and longitudinal lines intersecting, as the sculpture of some shells.
- Deflexed – Bent downward, as the last whorl in some snails.
- Dentate – With points or nodules resembling teeth, as the aperture of some snails.
- Denticulate – Finely dentate.
- Depressed – Flattened, as the spire in some snails.
- Dextral – Right-handed.
- Digitiform – Finger-like.
- Dilated – Expanded in all directions, as the aperture of a shell.
- Dimorphism – With two forms or conditions.
- Dioecious – Having the sexes in two individuals, one male and one female.
- Distal – The farthest part from an object.
- Discoidal – Shaped like a flat disk.
- Diverticulum – A pouch or hole, as the pouch containing the radula, or that containing the dart in helices.
- Dormant – In a state of torpor or sleep.
- Dorsal – The back. In gastropods the opposite to the aperture.
- Ectocone – The outer cusp on the teeth of the radula.
- Edentulous – Without teeth or folds, as the aperture in some gastropods.
- Efferent – Carrying out.
- Elliptical – With an oval form.
- Elongated – Drawn out, as the spire of a shell.
- Emarginate – Bluntly notched.
- Encysted – Enclosed in a cyst.
- Entocone – The inner cusp on the teeth of the radula.
- Entire – With even, unbroken edges, as the aperture of some shells.
- Epiphallus – A portion of the vas deferens which becomes modified into a tube-like organ and is continued beyond the apex of the penis; it frequently bears a blind duct, or flagellum.
- Epithelium – All tissues bounding a free surface.
- Equidistant – Equally spaced, as the spiral lines on some snail shells.
- Equilibrating – Balancing equally.
- Eroded – Worn away, as the epidermis on some shells.
- Erosive – Capable of erosion.
- Excavated – Hollowed out, as the columella of some snails.
- Excurrent – Referring to the siphon which carries out the waste matter of the body.
- Exoskeleton – The outer skeleton; all shells are exoskeletons.
- Exserted – Brought out.
- Expanded – Spread out, as the lip of some shells.
- Falcate – Scythe-shaped.
- Fasciculus – A little bundle.
- Flagellate – Animals with a flagellum or lash.
- Flexuous – Formed in a series of curves or turnings, as the columella in some shells.
- Flocculent – Clinging together in bunches.
- Fluviatile – Living in running streams.
- Fusiform – Thick in the middle and tapering at each end.
- Gelatinous – Like jelly, as the eggs of some mollusks.
- Gibbous – Very much rounded, as the whorls in some snails.
- Glandular – Like a gland.
- Globose – Rounded.
- Granulated – Covered with little grains.
- Gravid – A female mollusk with ovaries distended with young.
- Gregarious – Living in colonies.
- Gular – Relating to the windpipe or palate. In mollusks, referring to the innermost part of the aperture.
- Habitat – Locality of a species.
- Hasmolymph – Molluscan blood.
- Heliciform – In form like Helix.
- Hemispherical – Half a sphere.
- Herbivorous – Subsisting upon vegetable food.
- Hermaphrodite – Having the sexes united in the same individual.
- Hibernation – The act of hibernating or going to sleep for the winter months.
- Hirsute – Covered with hairs, as some snails.
- Hispid – Same as hirsute.
- Homologous – Having the same position or value, as the wing of a bird and of a bat.
- Hyaline – Glassy.
- Imperforate – Not perforated or umbilicated.
- Impressed – Marked by a furrow, as the impressed spiral lines on some gastropod shells.
- Incrassate – Thickened.
- Incurved – Leaned or bent over, as the apex in some snails.
- Indented – Notched.
- Inflected – Turned in, as the teeth of some snails.
- Inhalent – Same as incurrent.
- Inoperculate – Without an operculum.
- Intercostate – Between the ribs or ridges.
- Invaginate – One part bending into another, as the tentacles of some land snails.
- Invertible – Capable of being inverted, or drawn in, as the eye-peduncles of a land snail.
- Juvenile
- Keeled – With a more or less sharp projection at the periphery.
- Lamellated – Covered with scales.
- Lamelliform – Having the form of scales.
- Laminated – Consisting of plates or scales laid over each other.
- Lanceolate – Gradually tapering to a point.
- Lateral – Pertaining to the side.
- Latticed – (See decussated.)
- Lobulate – Composed of lobes.
- Longitudinal – The length of a shell.
- Lunate – Shaped like a half moon, as the aperture in some shells.
- Malleated – Appearing as though hammered.
- Manducatory – Relating to the apparatus for masticating food. In snails, the jaws and radula.
- Median – Middle, as the middle tooth on the radula.
- Mesocene – The middle cusp on the teeth of the radula.
- Monoecius – Having the sexes united in the same individual.
- Multifid – Made up of many lobes or projections, as the cusps on some radulae.
- Multispiral – Consisting of many whorls, as some fresh-water snails.
- Nacreous – Pearly or iridescent.
- Nepionic – The second stage of the embryonic shell, as the glochidium.
- Notched – Nicked or indented, as the anterior canal of some gastropods.
- Nucleus – The first part or beginning, as the apex in a gastropod shell.
- Nucleated – Having a nucleus.
- Obconic – In the form of a reversed cone.
- Oblique – Slanting, as the aperture of some shells when not parallel to the longitudinal axis.
- Obovate – Reversed ovate, as some shells when the diameter is greater near the upper than at the lower part.
- Obtuse – Dull or blunt, as the apex of some gastropods.
- Olfactory – Pertaining to the smell.
- Olivaceous – Colored like an olive.
- Organism – An organized being, or living object made up of organs.
- Ovate – Egg-shaped.
- Ovately conic – Shaped like an egg, but with a somewhat conic apex, as some gastropods.
- Oviparous – Bringing forth young in an egg which is hatched after it is laid.
- Ovisac – A pouch in which the eggs or embryos are contained.
- Ovoviviparous – In this case the young are formed in an egg but are hatched inside the parent.
- Pallial lung
- Papillose – Covered with many little bulgings or pimples.
- Parallel – Having the same relative distance in all parts, as when the spiral lines in univalve shells are the same distance apart all the way around.
- Patelliform – Shaped like a flattened-out cone, as an Ancylus.
- Patulous – Open and spreading, as the aperture in some gastropods.
- Paucispiral – Only slightly spiral, as some opercula.
- Pectinate – Like the teeth of a comb, as the gills of some mollusks.
- Pedal – Pertaining to the foot.
- Pedunculated – Supported on a stem or stalk, as the eyes of land snails.
- Pellucid – Transparent or clear, as the shells of some snails; e. g. Vitrea.
- Penultimate – The whorl before the last in gastropod shells.
- Pericardium – The chamber containing the heart.
- Periostracum – The epidermal covering of some shells.
- Pervious – Very narrowly open, as the umbilicus in some snails.
- Phytophagus – Vegetable-feeding.
- Pilose – Covered with hairs.
- Pinnate – Branched like a feather, as the gills of some mollusks.
- Plaited – Folded.
- Planispiral shell
- Planorboid – Flat and orb-like, as some snails.
- Pleurae – Relating to the side of a body.
- Plexus – A network of vessels, as the form of the lungs in snails.
- Plicated – Made up of folds.
- Plumose – Resembling plumes.
- Polygonal – Having many angles.
- Porcellanous – Like porcelain.
- Prismatic – Like a prism.
- Prodissoconch – The embryonic shell.
- Protoconch – The embryonic shell.
- Protract – To push out.
- Protractor pedis – The foot protractor muscle.
- Protrusile – Capable of being pushed out.
- Proximal – The nearest end of an object.
- Pulsation – A throb, as the throbbing of the heart.
- Pupiform – Like a pupa; one of the stages in the development of an insect.
- Pustulate – Covered with pustules or little pimples.
- Pustulose – Same as pustulate.
- Pyramidal – Having the form of a pyramid.
- Pyriform – Shaped like a pear.
- Reflected – Bent backward, as the lip in some snails.
- Reflexed – Same as Reflected.
- Renal – Relating to the kidneys.
- Reticulated – Resembling a network, as when the longitudinal and spiral lines cross in a snail.
- Retractile – Capable of being drawn in, as the eye peduncles in land snails.
- Retractor pedis – Foot retractor muscle.
- Revolving lines – Spiral lines on a snail shell which run parallel with the sutures.
- Rhombic – Having four sides, the angles being oblique.
- Rhomboid – Four-sided, but two of the sides being longer than the others.
- Rimate – Provided with a very small hole or crack, as some snails in which the umbilicus is very narrowly open.
- Roundly lunate – Rounder than lunate (which see).
- Rostriform – In the form of a rostrum.
- Rudimentary – Not fully formed; imperfect.
- Rugose – Rough or wrinkled, as parts of some shells.
- Sacculated – Somewhat like a sac, or composed of sac-like parts.
- Scalar – Resembling a ladder.
- Secreted – Produced or deposited from the blood or glands, as the shell material in mollusks.
- Semicircular – Half round or circular, as the aperture in some snails.
- Semidentate – Half toothed, as the parietal wall in some land snails.
- Semielliptic – Half elliptical.
- Semiglobose – Half, or not quite globose.
- Semilunate – Half lunate.
- Semioval – Half, or not quite oval.
- Serrated – Notched, like the teeth on a saw.
- Serriform – In the form of series.
- Sessile – Attached without a stem, as the eyes in some water snails.
- Shouldered – Ridged, as the whorls in some snails.
- Sigmoid – Shaped like the letter S.
- Siliceous – Made up of silex.
- Sinistral – Having the aperture on the left side.
- Sinusigerid – with a diagonally cancellate (structure)
- Sinuous – Curved in and out, as the edge of some bivalves and the lips of some snails.
- Siphonal canal – semi-tubular extension of the aperture of the shell through which the siphon is extended when the animal is active
- Spatulate – In the form of a spatula, a flat-bladed instrument used by druggists in pulverizing drugs.
- Spherical – Shaped like a sphere.
- Spiral – Wound about a central cavity, as the whorls of snails.
- Striated – Marked by lines or striae.
- Subangulated – Moderately angled.
- Subcarinated – Moderately carinated.
- Subcentral – Not quite in the center.
- Subcircular – Not quite circular.
- Subconical – Moderately conical.
- Subcylindrical – Moderately cylindrical.
- Subequal – Not quite equal.
- Subexcavated – A little excavated.
- Subfusiform – Moderately fusiform.
- Subglobose – Moderately globose.
- Subglobular – Moderately globular.
- Subhyaline – Moderately glassy.
- Subimperforate – Not much perforated.
- Suboblong – Moderately oblong.
- Subobsolete – Almost disappearing.
- Subovate – Nearly ovate.
- Subparallel – Almost parallel.
- Subperforated – Almost perforated.
- Subquadrate – Almost four-sided.
- Subreflected – Moderately turned back.
- Subrotund – Moderately round.
- Subspiral – Moderately spiral.
- Subtriangulate – Moderately or almost triangular.
- Subtrigonal – Moderately three-angled.
- Subtruncate – Moderately cut off.
- Subumbilicated – Moderately umbilicated.
- Sulcated – Grooved.
- Sulcus – A longitudinal furrow.
- Superanal – Above the anus.
- Supra-peripheral – Above the periphery.
- Symmetrical – Alike on both sides or uniform in all parts.
- Terrestrial – Living on the land.
- Testaceous – Composed of shelly matter.
- Torsion – A twisting around.
- Tortuous – Twisted or winding.
- Torpid – Half unconscious or asleep, as a snail during hibernation.
- Translucent – Not quite transparent; light is seen through the thin edges of the object.
- Transparent – Objects may be seen through the substance.
- Transverse – Referring to the form of a shell when it is wider than high.
- Tricuspidate – Having three cusps.
- Trifid – Having three branches.
- Trigonal – Having three angles.
- Trilobate – Having three lobes.
- Tripartite – Divided into three parts, as the foot of some snails.
- Truncate – Having the end cut off squarely.
- Tuberculate – Covered with tubercles or rounded knobs.
- Turbinate – Having the form of a top.
- Turriculated – Having the form of a tower.
- Turreted – Having the form of a tower.
- Umbilicated – Having an opening in the base of the shell.
- Undulated – Having undulations or waves.
- Univalve – Having the shell composed of a single piece, as a snail.
- Varicose – Swollen or enlarged.
- Vascular – Containing or made up of blood vessels.
- Vermiform – Formed like a worm.
- Ventral – The lower border or side.
- Ventricose – Swollen or inflated on the ventral side.
- Vibratile – Moving from side to side.
- Vitreous – Resembling glass, as some snails.

== See also ==
- Outline of gastropods
- Glossary of biology
- Glossary of scientific names
- Glossary of scientific naming
