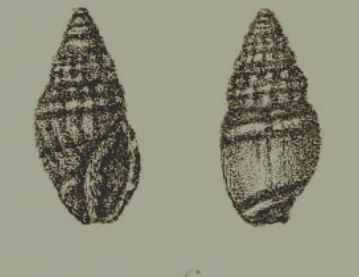
- Drawing of a shell of Vexillum accinctum (holotype)

Scientific classification
- Kingdom: Animalia
- Phylum: Mollusca
- Class: Gastropoda
- Subclass: Caenogastropoda
- Order: Neogastropoda
- Superfamily: Turbinelloidea
- Family: Costellariidae
- Genus: Vexillum
- Species: V. accinctum

Binomial name
- Vexillum accinctum (G. B. Sowerby III, 1907)

Synonyms
- Mitra (Pusia) accincta G. B. Sowerby III, 1907; Mitra accincta G. B. Sowerby III, 1907; Pusia accinctum (G.B. III Sowerby, 1907); Vexillum (Pusia) accinctum (G. B. Sowerby III, 1907)

= Vexillum accinctum =

Species of gastropod

Vexillum accinctum is a species of sea snail, a marine gastropod mollusk, in the family Costellariidae, the ribbed miters.

== Description ==
The length of the shell attains 16 mm.

This species belongs to the group of Vexillum luculentum (Reeve, 1845); in colour and banding it somewhat resembles Mitra montrouzieri Tapparone-Canefri, 1874) but it is of a narrower form and the ribs are much less numerous, rounded, smooth, and in some cases almost obsolete on the body whorl. The specimens present some variation in the disposition of the colour lines and bands, but the most characteristic specimens have, as in the type, two brown lines or narrow zones in the middle of the penultimate and towards the upper part of the body whorl, with a whitish zone between.

== Distribution ==
This marine species occurs off Japan, New Caledonia and Australia; also off Mozambique.
