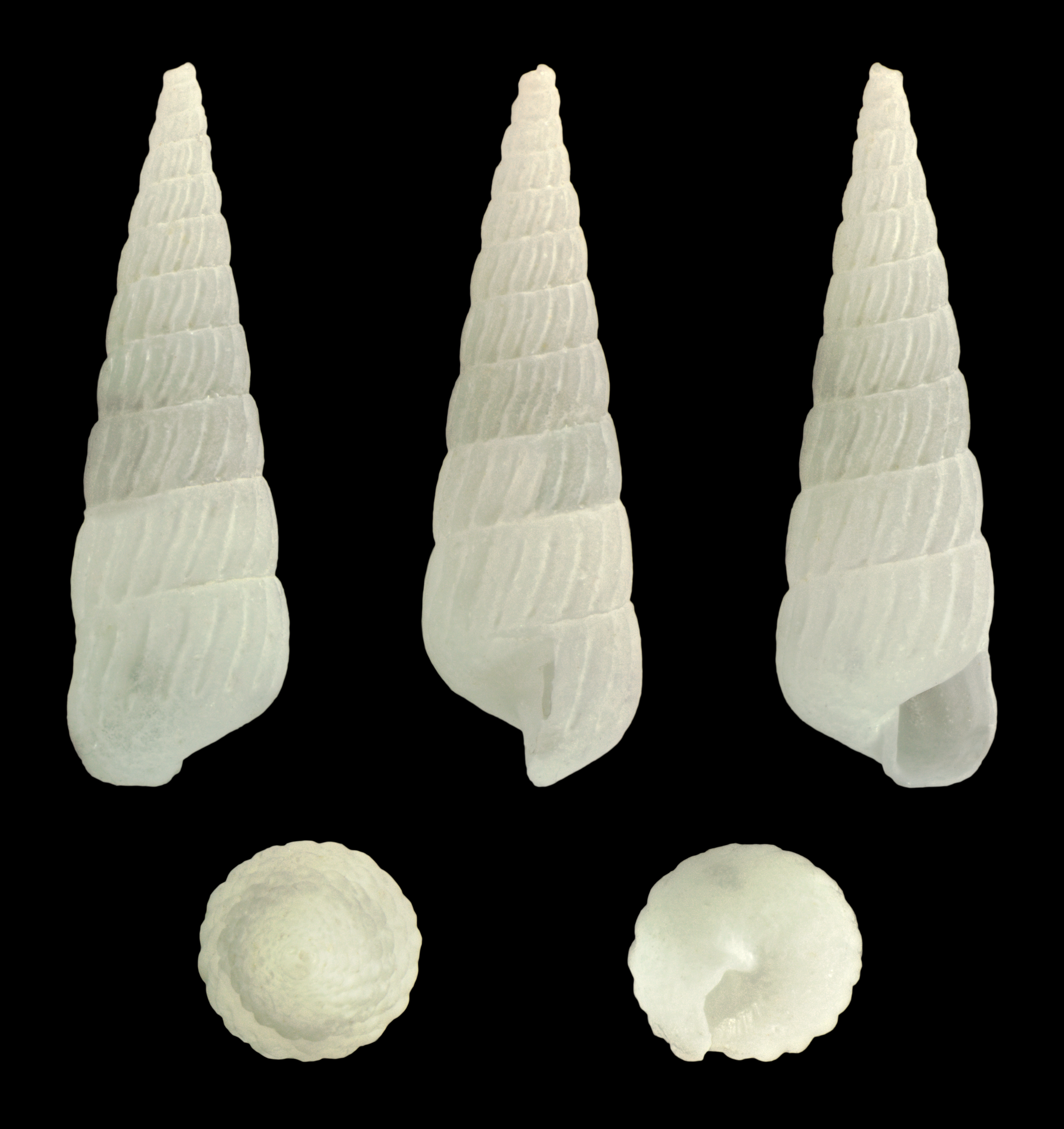

Scientific classification
- Kingdom: Animalia
- Phylum: Mollusca
- Class: Gastropoda
- Family: Pyramidellidae
- Genus: Turbonilla
- Species: T. lactea

Binomial name
- Turbonilla lactea (Linnaeus, 1758)

Synonyms
- Chemnitzia campanellae Philippi, 1836; Odostomia elegantissima (Montagu, 1803); Turbo elegantissimus Montagu, 1803; Turbo lacteus Linnaeus, 1758; Turbonilla elegantissima similis (f) Monterosato, T.A. de M. di, 1878; Turbonilla (Chemnitzia) elegantissima (Montagu, 1803); Turbonilla (Turbonilla) lactea (Linnaeus, 1758)

= Turbonilla lactea =

Species of gastropod

Turbonilla lactea is a species of sea snail, a marine gastropod mollusk in the family Pyramidellidae, the pyrams and their allies.

== Description ==
The length of the shell varies between 3 mm and 8 mm. The shell consists of almost straight-sided whorls with deep, flat sutures. Its shell, marked with "thick, flat, slightly sinuous, oblique costae" that are "indistinct on the first whorl" and prominent thereafter, has a milky-white colour, on which the Turbonilla lactea species name is based.

== Distribution ==
This species occurs in the following locations:

- Atlantic Europe
- Azores Exclusive Economic Zone
- Belgian Exclusive Economic Zone
- British Isles
- Canary Islands
- Cape Verde
- Dorset
- European waters (ERMS scope)
- Goote Bank
- Greek Exclusive Economic Zone
- Irish Exclusive economic Zone
- Mediterranean Sea
- Portuguese Exclusive Economic Zone
- São Tomé and Príncipe Exclusive Economic Zone
- Spanish Exclusive Economic Zone
- United Kingdom Exclusive Economic Zone
- Wimereux

== Notes ==
Additional information regarding this species:

- Synonymy: It is unclear why some British authors (e.g. Winckworth, 1932; Graham, 1971; McKay & Smith, 1979) prefer the junior synonym Turbonilla elegantissima (Montagu, 1803).
