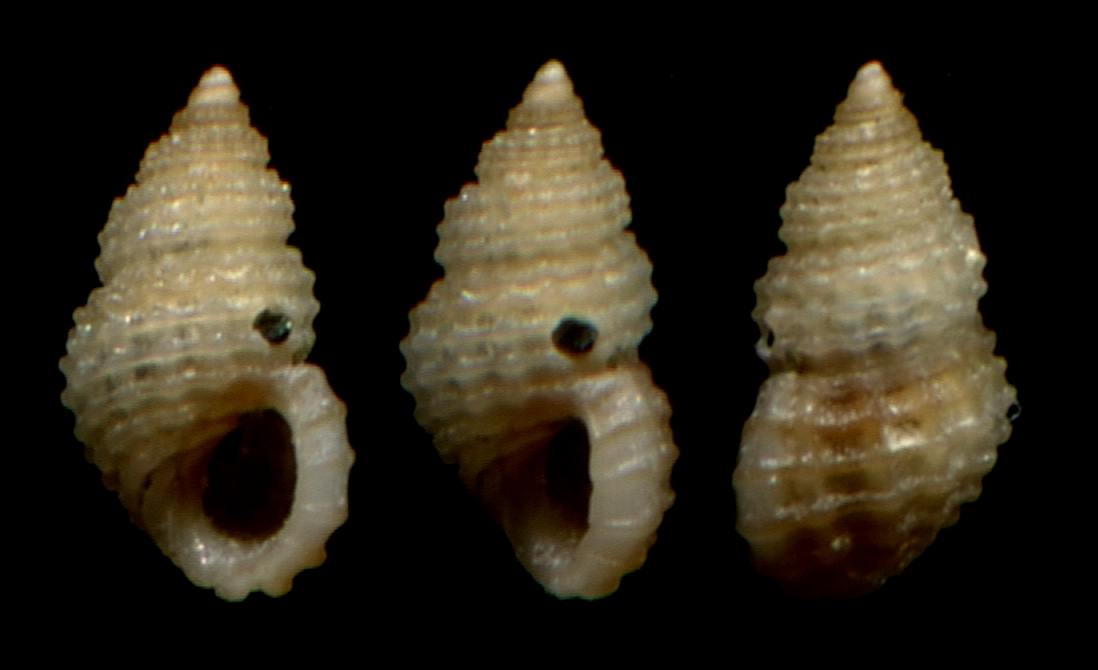
- Shell of Alvania hispidula

Scientific classification
- Kingdom: Animalia
- Phylum: Mollusca
- Class: Gastropoda
- Subclass: Caenogastropoda
- Order: Littorinimorpha
- Superfamily: Rissooidea
- Family: Rissoidae
- Genus: Alvania
- Species: A. hispidula

Binomial name
- Alvania hispidula (Monterosato, 1884)

Synonyms
- Acinus hispidulus Monterosato, 1884; Rissoa cancellata R. A. Philippi, 1844 junior homonym; Rissoa clathrata R. A. Philippi, 1844 junior homonym (junior homonym of Rissia clathrata Gray, 1826, and R. clathratra Grateloup, 1828); Turbona elegantula F. Nordsieck, 1972 (dubious synonym); Turbona hispidula (Monterosato, 1884)

= Alvania hispidula =

Species of gastropod

Alvania hispidula is a species of minute sea snail, a marine gastropod mollusk or micromollusk in the family Rissoidae.

== Description ==
The length of the shell varies between 2.5 mm and 5 mm.

The rather solid, brownish shell is regularly clathrate by longitudinal narrow riblets and numerous spiral lirae. The outer lip is plicate within and externally dentately varicose. The shell contains six moderately convex whorls.

== Distribution ==
This species occurs in the Mediterranean Sea (off Lazio, Italy; off Greece)
