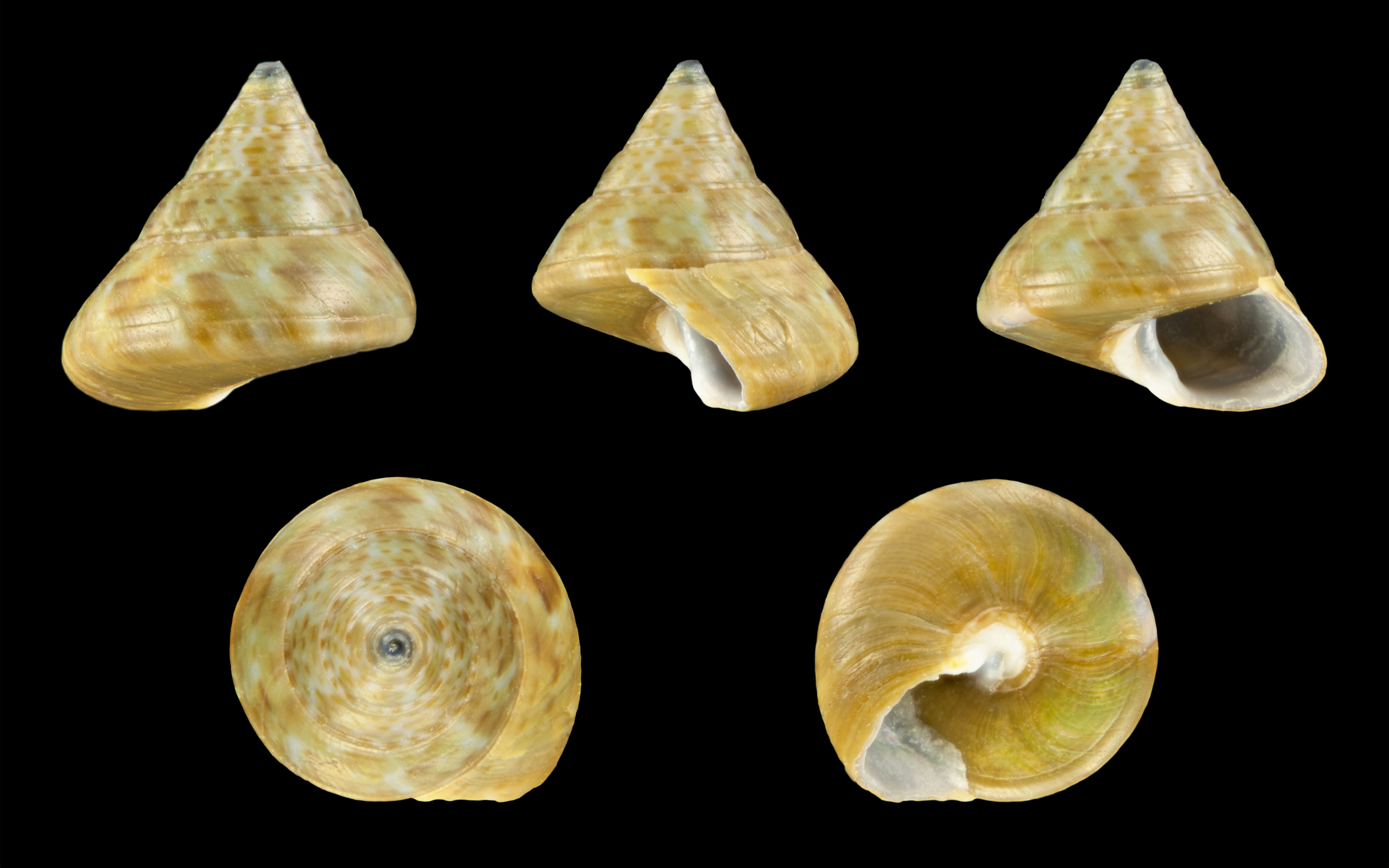
- A shell of Calliostoma laugieri laugieri

Scientific classification
- Kingdom: Animalia
- Phylum: Mollusca
- Class: Gastropoda
- Subclass: Vetigastropoda
- Order: Trochida
- Family: Calliostomatidae
- Genus: Calliostoma
- Species: C. laugieri

Binomial name
- Calliostoma laugieri (Payraudeau, 1826)

Synonyms
- Calliostoma floreanae Parenzan, 1970; Calliostoma laugieri var. fulva Pallary, 1900; Calliostoma kochi Pallary, 1902; Calliostoma planatum var. dilatata Koch & Pallary in Pallary, 1900; Calliostoma planatum var. marmorata Pallary, 1900; Trochus hyacinthinus de Blainville, 1830; Trochus laugieri Payraudeau, 1826 (original publication); Trochus laugieri var. olivaceoconcolor Bucquoy, Dautzenberg & Dollfus, 1884; Trochus seriopunctatus de Blainville 1830; Trochus violaceus var. laevigata Sandri & Danilo, 1856; Trochus violaceus var. lineata Sandri & Danilo, 1856; Trochus violaceus var. torquata Sandri & Danilo, 1856

= Calliostoma laugieri =

Species of gastropod

Calliostoma laugieri is a species of sea snail, a marine gastropod mollusk in the family Calliostomatidae.

Subspecies

- Calliostoma laugieri laugieri (Payraudeau, 1826)
- Calliostoma laugieri spongiarum (Bucquoy, Dautzenberg & Dollfus, 1885)

== Description ==
The size of the shell varies between 7 mm and 17 mm. The shell is similar to Calliostoma conulus, but smaller, generally darker in color. The apical whorls are not (or but slightly) granulate. The form is straightly conical with about 8 whorls. The minute apical whorl is smooth. The following whorls, to the number of three or less, are granulate. Then there are several spirally grooved whorls, the lower ones either smooth or grooved. The distinct supra-sutural fasciole is articulated. The base of the shell is spirally grooved, sometimes smooth except around the axis. The color of the shell is very mutable with numerous varieties: dark olive-green or olive-brown, unicolored or longitudinally clouded with brown and lineolate with bluish; or yellowish, clouded with brown or yellow; or uniform purple. The aperture is sulcate or smooth inside.

== Distribution ==
This species occurs in the Mediterranean Sea and off Portugal.
