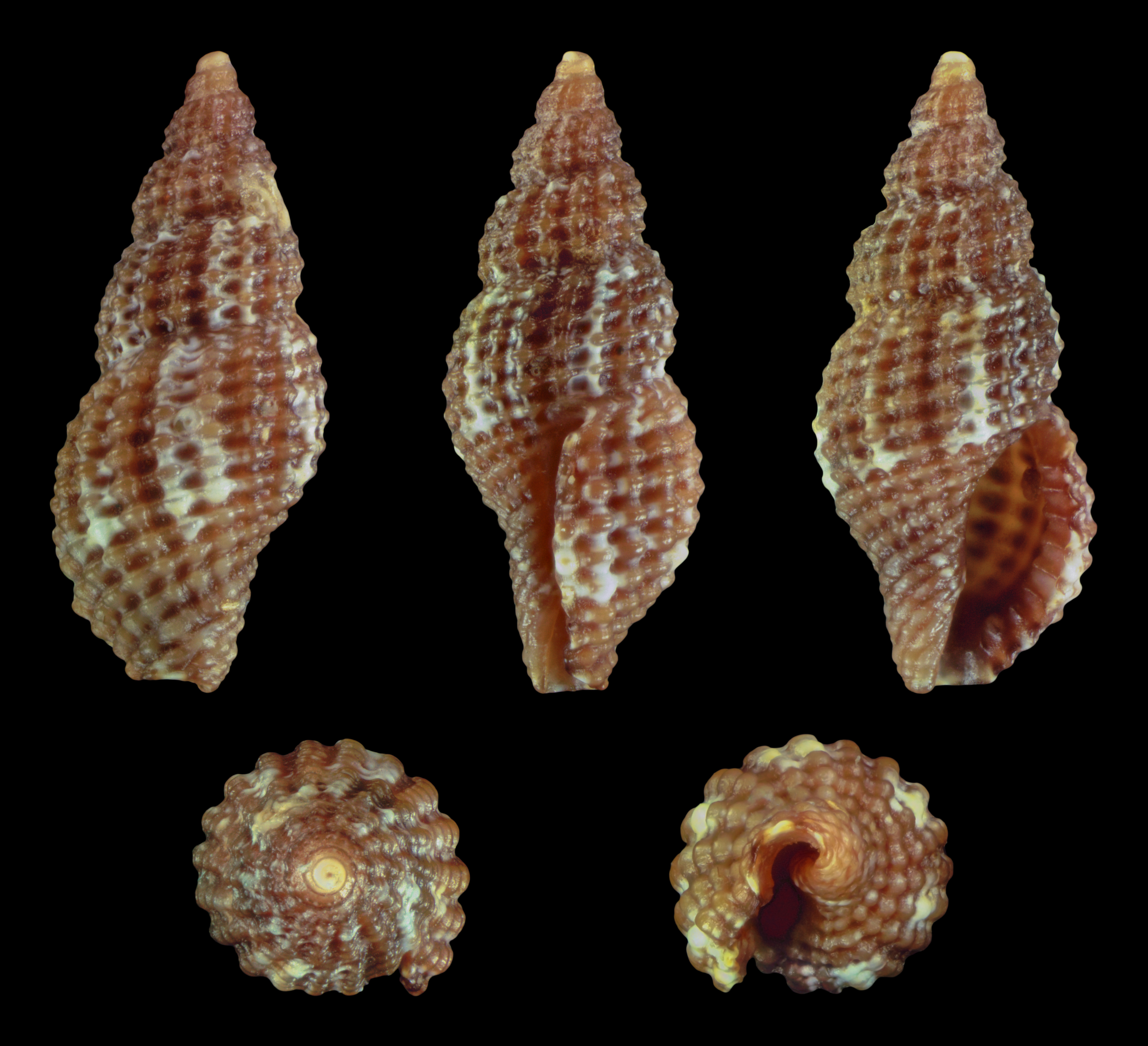
- A shell of Raphitoma philberti

Scientific classification
- Kingdom: Animalia
- Phylum: Mollusca
- Class: Gastropoda
- Subclass: Caenogastropoda
- Order: Neogastropoda
- Superfamily: Conoidea
- Family: Raphitomidae
- Genus: Raphitoma
- Species: R. philberti

Binomial name
- Raphitoma philberti (Michaud, 1829)

Synonyms
- Homotoma philberti (Michaud, 1829); Pleurotoma philberti Michaud, 1829 (original combination); Pleurotoma variegata Philippi, 1836; Pleurotoma variegatum Philippi, 1836; Pleurotoma versicolor Scacchi, 1836 (dubious synonym); Raphitoma variegatum Philippi, 1836; Raphitoma versicolor Scacchi, 1836 (dubious synonym)

= Raphitoma philberti =

Species of sea snail

Raphitoma philberti is a species of sea snail, a marine gastropod mollusk in the family Raphitomidae.

== Description ==
The length of the shell varies between 6 mm and 14 mm.

The shell is turreted and fusiform. It contains about six convex whorls. They contain longitudinally rather tuberculated ribs that are decussated by coarse, elevated, transverse striae. The outer lip is thickened within, somewhat contracting the aperture, and strongly dentated with seven or eight elevated teeth. It has a moderately sized sinus immediately at the suture. Coloration uniformly tawny-reddish, from light to dark, with whitish blotches as wide as two axials usually vanishing towards the suture. Comma-shaped white spots on the subsutural ramp. Soft parts foot sharped bilobed anteriorly. Black eyes at proximal 1/3 of tentacles. Foot and cephalic tentacles withish/yellowish semi-transparent with many bright white spots, head semi-transparent greyish/blackish. Siphon blackish with withish spots and a whitish ring at top.

== Distribution ==
This species occurs in the Northern Atlantic Ocean and in the Mediterranean Sea.
