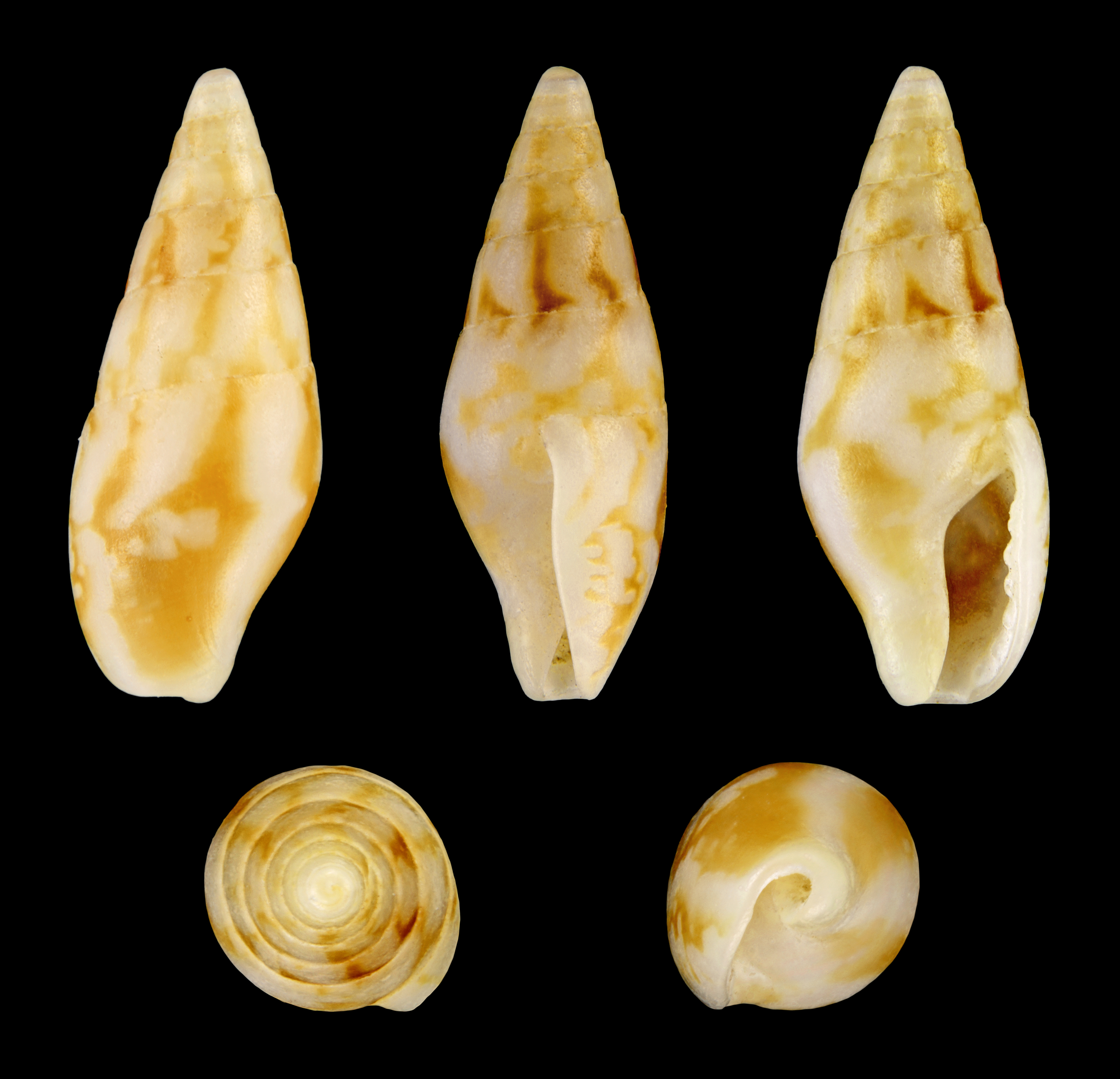
- Shell of Mitrella scripta

Scientific classification
- Kingdom: Animalia
- Phylum: Mollusca
- Class: Gastropoda
- Subclass: Caenogastropoda
- Order: Neogastropoda
- Family: Columbellidae
- Genus: Mitrella
- Species: M. scripta

Binomial name
- Mitrella scripta (Linnaeus, 1758)

Synonyms
- List: Buccinum corniculatum Lamarck, 1822; Buccinum linneai Payraudeau, 1826; Buccinum linneai var. lactea Philippi, 1836; Buccinum linneai var. major Philippi, 1836; Columbella scripta var. abbreviata Bucquoy, Dautzenberg & Dollfus, 1882; Columbella scripta var. albida Monterosato, 1878; Columbella scripta var. brevis Monterosato, 1875; Columbella scripta var. elongata Bucquoy, Dautzenberg & Dollfus, 1882; Columbella scripta var. flammulata Monterosato, 1878; Columbella scripta var. flammulata Pallary, 1900; Columbella scripta var. flavida Monterosato, 1878; Columbella scripta var. major Monterosato, 1878; Columbella scripta var. minor Monterosato, 1878; Columbella scripta var. turgida Monterosato, 1878; Columbella scripta var. unifasciata Monterosato, 1878; Columbella scripta var. variegata Monterosato, 1878; Fusus glaber Risso, 1826; Mitrella flaminea Risso, 1826; Mitrella scripta var. acutalis Monterosato, 1923; Mitrella syrtiaca Pallary, 1908; Murex conulus Olivi, 1792; Murex scriptus Linnaeus, 1758(basionym); Pisania laevigata Bivona-Bernardi, 1832; Purpura corniculata Risso, 1826; Purpura lamarckii Risso, 1826; Pyrene scripta (Linnaeus, 1758)

= Mitrella scripta =

Species of gastropod

Mitrella scripta, the music dove shell, is a species of sea snail in the family Columbellidae, the dove snails.

== Description ==
The shell of an adult Mitrella scripta grows to a length of about 18 millimetres (0.71 in). This sea snail is a high spired, biconic columbellid with smooth, unsculptured shells and a denticulated inner surface of the external lip. The surface of the shell usually is white with a patching of pale brown on the whorls.

== Distribution ==
This species occurs in European waters (Spain, Portugal, Madeira), the Mediterranean Sea and in the Indian Ocean off Tanzania.
