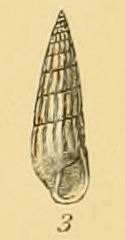
- Turbonilla pusilla shell

Scientific classification
- Kingdom: Animalia
- Phylum: Mollusca
- Class: Gastropoda
- Family: Pyramidellidae
- Genus: Turbonilla
- Species: T. pusilla

Binomial name
- Turbonilla pusilla (Philippi, 1844)

Synonyms
- Chemnitzia pusilla Philippi, 1844

= Turbonilla pusilla =

Species of gastropod

Turbonilla pusilla is a species of sea snail, a marine gastropod mollusk in the family Pyramidellidae, the pyrams and their allies.

== Distribution ==
This species occurs in the following locations:

- European waters (ERMS scope)
- Greek Exclusive Economic Zone
- Portuguese Exclusive Economic Zone
- Spanish Exclusive Economic Zone
- United Kingdom Exclusive Economic Zone
