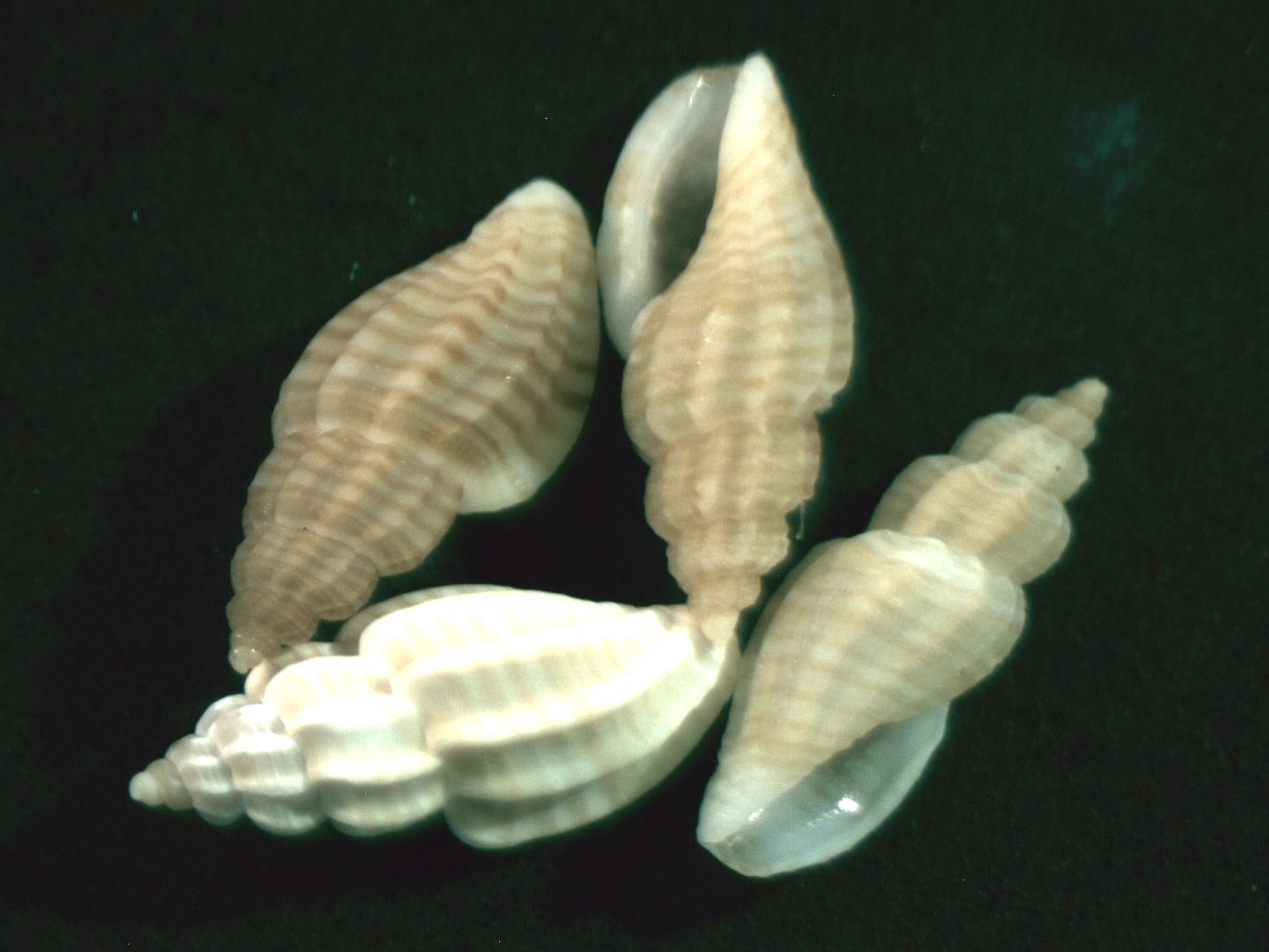
- Shells of Mangelia striolata

Scientific classification
- Kingdom: Animalia
- Phylum: Mollusca
- Class: Gastropoda
- Subclass: Caenogastropoda
- Order: Neogastropoda
- Superfamily: Conoidea
- Family: Mangeliidae
- Genus: Mangelia
- Species: M. striolata

Binomial name
- Mangelia striolata Risso, 1826

Synonyms
- Mangelia bertrandii (Payraudeau, 1826); Mangelia caerulans (Philippi, 1844); Mangelia paucicostata Risso, 1826; Mangiliella bertrandii (Payraudeau, 1826); Mangiliella coerulans [sic] (misspelling); Pleurotoma bertrandii Payraudeau, 1826; Pleurotoma caerulans Philippi, 1844; Pleurotoma coerulans [sic] (misspelling); Pleurotoma striolata Risso, 1826 (original combination)

= Mangelia striolata =

Species of gastropod

Mangelia striolata is a species of sea snail, a marine gastropod mollusk in the family Mangeliidae.

== Description ==
The length of the shell varies between 4 mm and 15 mm.

== Distribution ==
This species occurs in European waters off Portugal and Spain, and in the Mediterranean Sea off Greece and Italy.
