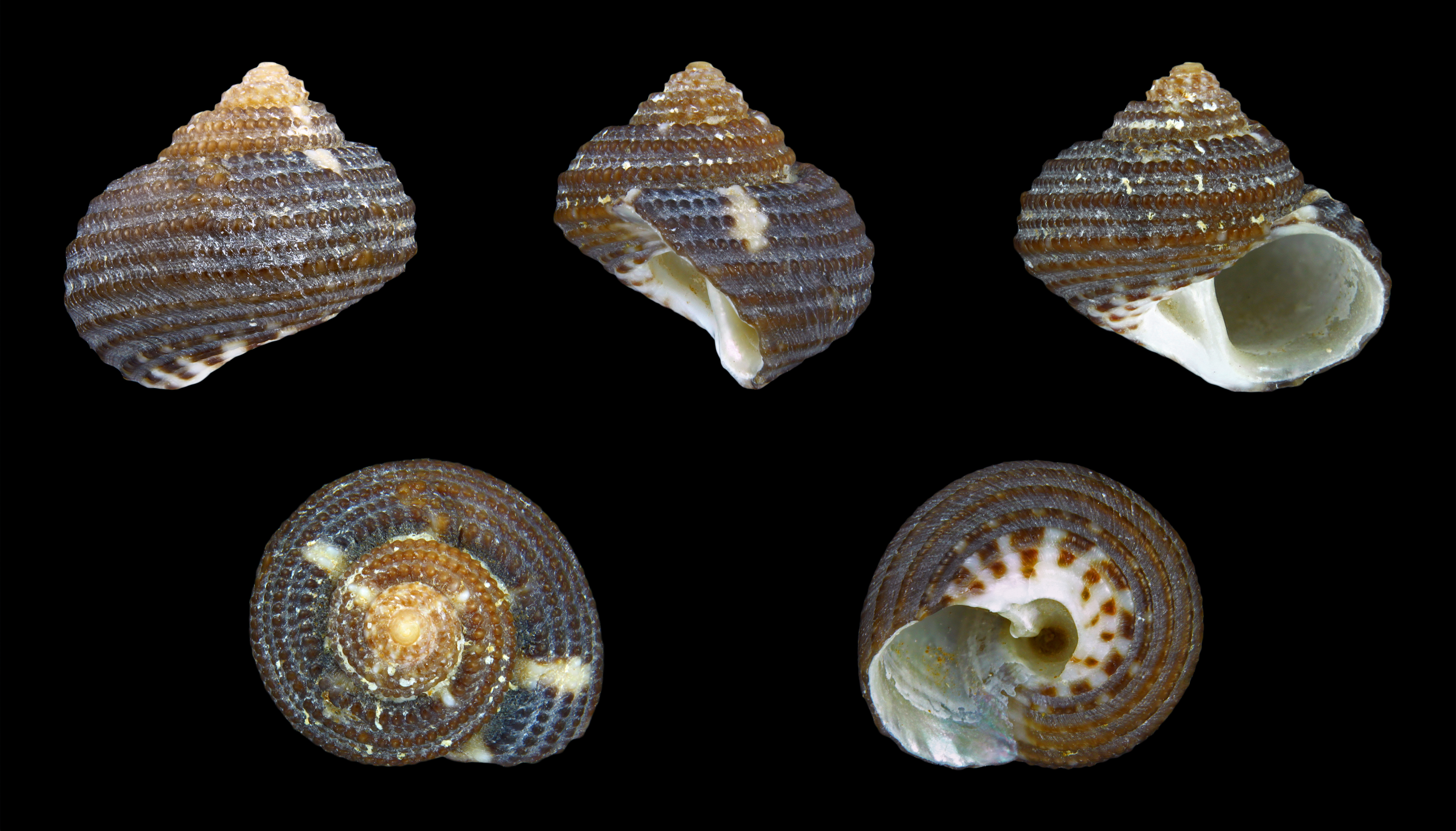

Scientific classification
- Kingdom: Animalia
- Phylum: Mollusca
- Class: Gastropoda
- Subclass: Vetigastropoda
- Order: Trochida
- Superfamily: Trochoidea
- Family: Trochidae
- Genus: Clanculus
- Species: C. cruciatus

Binomial name
- Clanculus cruciatus (Linnaeus, 1758)

Synonyms
- Clanculus (Clanculopsis) cruciatus (Linnaeus, 1758); Clanculus cruciatus var. candida Monterosato, 1880; Clanculus cruciatus var. monochroa Monterosato, 1880; Clanculus cruciatus var. nigrescens Bucquoy, Dautzenberg & Dollfus, 1884; Clanculus cruciatus var. rosea Monterosato, 1880; Clanculus cruciatus var. rubescens Pallary, 1900; Gibbula rupestris Risso, 1826; Monodonta vieilliotii Payraudeau, 1826; Trochus cruciatus Linnaeus, 1758 (original description); Trochus mediterraneus Wood W., 1828; Trochus purpureus Risso, 1826; Trochus vieillioti (Payraudeau, 1826); Trochus vieillioti var. globosoconica Aradas & Benoit, 1874; Turbo purpureus Risso, 1826

= Clanculus cruciatus =

Species of gastropod

Clanculus cruciatus is a species of sea snail, a marine gastropod mollusk in the family Trochidae, the top snails.

== Description ==
The size of the shell varies between 6 mm and 10 mm. The narrowly umbilicate shell has a globose-conic shape with a conic spire and an acute apex. It is pinkish, dark brown, blackish or pink, radiately maculated with white below the sutures, and dotted with white around the center of the base. The 5 to 6 whorls are convex and separated by canaliculate sutures, and spirally granose-lirate. The body whorl is rounded, and encircled by about 13 lirae. Those above the periphery are granulose, about as wide as the interstices, those beneath more separated and smoother. The interstices are finely spirally striate. The base of the shell is convex. The oblique aperture is subcircular. The outer and basal lips are rounded and finely crenulate within. The columella is slightly concave, bearing a small denticle at its base and above near the insertion. The parietal wall is nearly smooth. The deep umbilicus is narrow, smooth, and white within. It is bordered by a strong smooth or obsoletely crenulated marginal rib, and surrounded by narrow tract of white.

== Distribution ==
This species occurs in the Mediterranean Sea.
