= Fusinus parvulus =

Scientific classification
- Kingdom: Animalia
- Phylum: Mollusca
- Class: Gastropoda
- Subclass: Caenogastropoda
- Order: Neogastropoda
- Family: Fasciolariidae
- Genus: Fusinus
- Species: F. parvulus

Binomial name
- Fusinus parvulus (Monterosato, 1884)

Synonyms
- Fusinus (Barbarofusus) suturalis F. Nordsieck, 1972 (dubious synonym); Pseudofusus parvulus Monterosato, 1884

Species of gastropod

Fusinus parvulus is a species of sea snail. It is a marine gastropod mollusc in the family Fasciolariidae, the spindle snails, the tulip snails and their allies.

== Distribution ==
This species occurs in the Mediterranean Sea
