= Turbonilla gradata =

Scientific classification
- Kingdom: Animalia
- Phylum: Mollusca
- Class: Gastropoda
- Family: Pyramidellidae
- Genus: Turbonilla
- Species: T. gradata

Binomial name
- Turbonilla gradata Bucquoy, Dautzenberg & Dollfus, 1883

Synonyms
- Turbonilla pseudogradata F. Nordsieck, 1972

Species of gastropod

Turbonilla gradata is a species of sea snail, a marine gastropod mollusk in the family Pyramidellidae, the pyrams and their allies.

== Description ==
The shell grows to a length of 4.6 mm.

== Distribution ==
This marine species occurs in the following locations:

- European waters (ERMS scope)
- Mediterranean Sea: Greece, Algeria
- Portuguese Exclusive Economic Zone
- Spanish Exclusive Economic Zone
