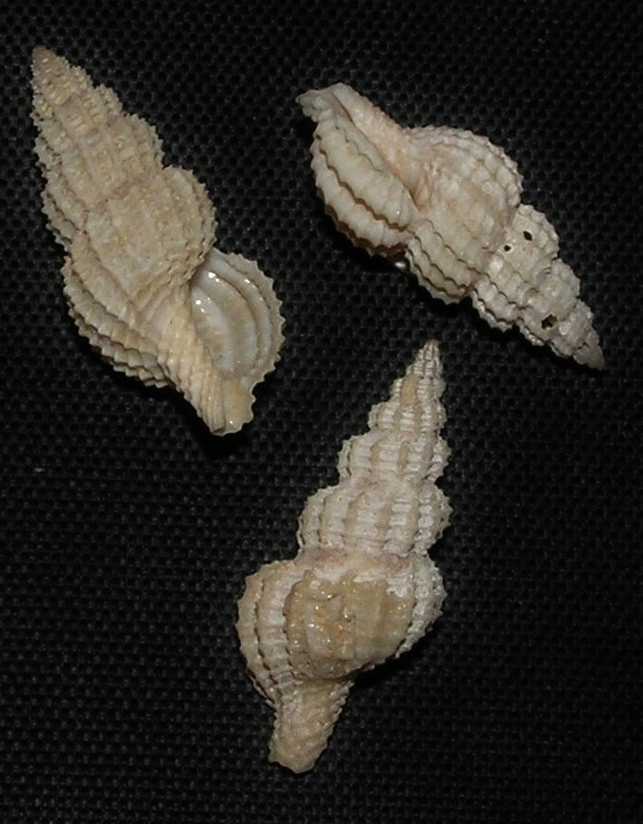
- Shells of Raphitoma echinata

Scientific classification
- Kingdom: Animalia
- Phylum: Mollusca
- Class: Gastropoda
- Subclass: Caenogastropoda
- Order: Neogastropoda
- Superfamily: Conoidea
- Family: Raphitomidae
- Genus: Raphitoma
- Species: R. echinata

Binomial name
- Raphitoma echinata (Brocchi, 1814)

Synonyms
- Clathurella septentrionalis Locard, 1891 (dubious synonym); Defrancia reticulata (Renier, 1804) (unavailable name (published in a work rejected by ICZN)); Homotoma reticulata Renier, 1804; Murex echinatus Brocchi, 1814; Murex reticulatus Brocchi, 1814; Murex reticulatus Renier, 1804 (unavailable name under ICZN Opinion 316); Philbertia asperimma Brown, C.T., 1827; Philbertia echinata (Brocchi, 1814); Philbertia reticulata (Renieri, 1804) (published in a paper rejected by ICZN opinion 316); Pleurotoma reticulata (Brocchi, 1814); Raphitoma reticulata Renier, 1804; Raphitoma reticulata Brocchi, 1814; Raphitoma septentrionalis Locard, 1892

= Raphitoma echinata =

Species of mollusc

Raphitoma echinata is a species of sea snail, a marine gastropod mollusk in the family Raphitomidae.

== Subspecies ==
- Raphitoma echinata pumila Monterosato, 1890

== Description ==
The shell length varies between 12 mm and 20 mm.

== Distribution ==
This species is distributed in the Mediterranean Sea along Apulia, Greece, and the Balearic Islands. They are also found north of the Hebrides and in the North Sea. As they occupy the coasts and the former Doggerland, it can be ascertained that Raphitoma echinata enjoy shallow waters.
