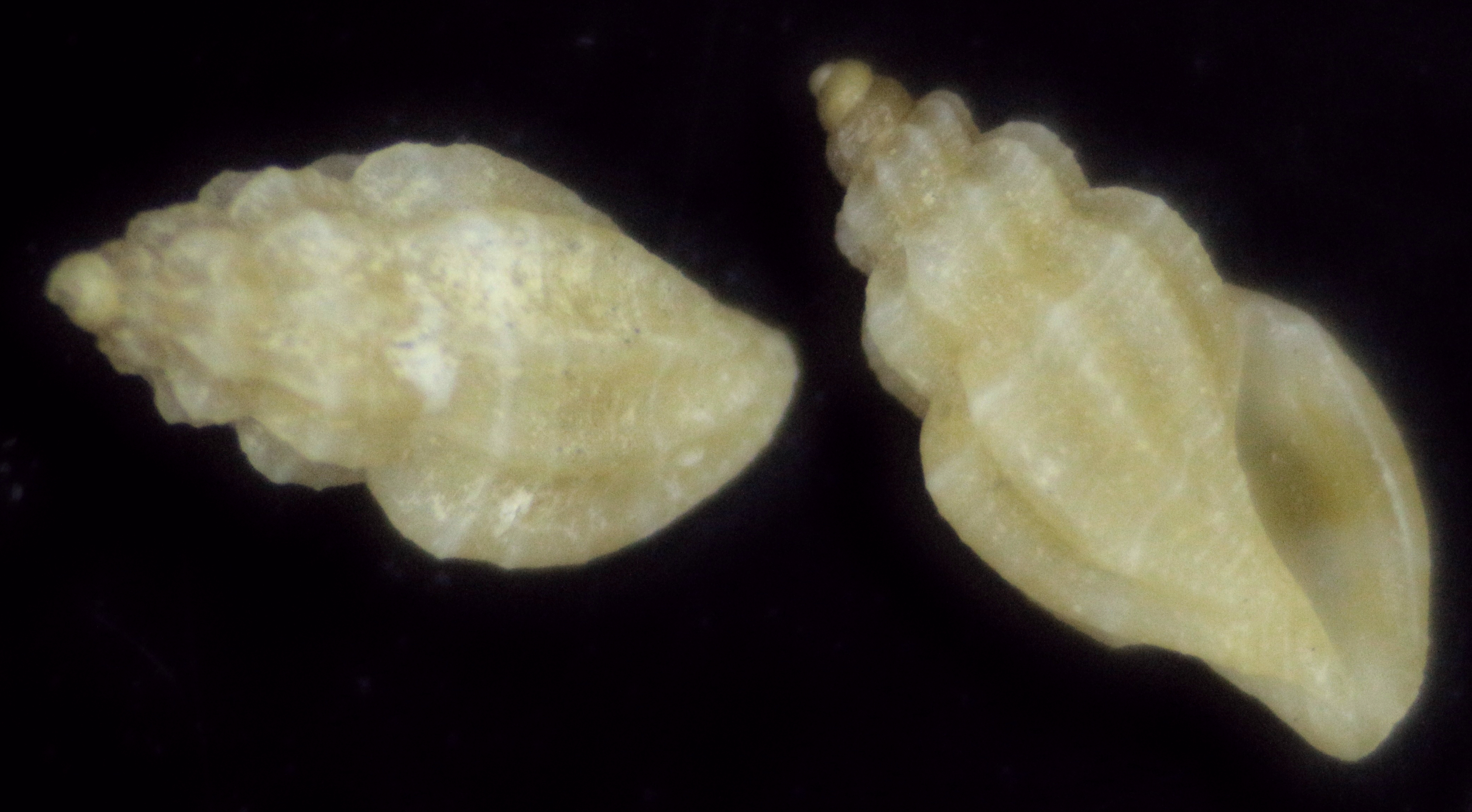
- Shells of Mangelia scabrida

Scientific classification
- Kingdom: Animalia
- Phylum: Mollusca
- Class: Gastropoda
- Subclass: Caenogastropoda
- Order: Neogastropoda
- Superfamily: Conoidea
- Family: Mangeliidae
- Genus: Mangelia
- Species: M. scabrida

Binomial name
- Mangelia scabrida Monterosato, 1890

Synonyms
- Daphnella (Mangilia) scabrida Monterosato, 1890; Mangelia scabrida elongata É.A.A. Locard & E. Caziot, 1900; Mangelia scabrida minor É.A.A. Locard & E. Caziot, 1900

= Mangelia scabrida =

Species of gastropod

Mangelia scabrida is a species of sea snail, a marine gastropod mollusk in the family Mangeliidae.

== Description ==
The length of the shell varies between 3 mm and 11 mm.

== Taxonomy ==
Mangelia scabrida was first described by Tommaso Di Maria Allery Monterosato in 1890. In 1977, Fritz Nordsieck described Cythara (Rugocythara) farina as a separate species. Subsequent taxonomic revisions concluded that Cythara (Rugocythara) farina and its later combination Mangelia farina are junior subjective synonyms of Mangelia scabrida, which remains the accepted name.

== Distribution ==
This species occurs in the Mediterranean Sea and in the North Atlantic Ocean.
