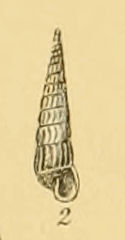

Scientific classification
- Kingdom: Animalia
- Phylum: Mollusca
- Class: Gastropoda
- Family: Pyramidellidae
- Genus: Turbonilla
- Species: T. acuta

Binomial name
- Turbonilla acuta (Donovan, 1804)

Synonyms
- Chemnitzia gracilis Philippi, 1844; Odostomia delicata Monterosato, 1874; Turbo acutus Donovan, 1804

= Turbonilla acuta =

Species of gastropod

Turbonilla acuta is a species of sea snail, a marine gastropod mollusk in the family Pyramidellidae, the pyrams and their allies.

== Distribution ==
This species occurs in the following locations:

- European waters (ERMS scope)
- Greek Exclusive Economic Zone
- Portuguese Exclusive Economic Zone
- Spanish Exclusive Economic Zone
- United Kingdom Exclusive Economic Zone
