= Fauna of Montenegro =

Native animals of Montenegro

Montenegro is the smallest Balkan nation in population and second smallest in land mass. The land mass is 13,812 square kilometres with 360 square kilometres of water. Montenegro's geography ranges from mountainous forested regions in the north where larger mammals are most common. Mediterranean coastline makes up the south end of the country, forested area makes up 40.4% of the nation's landmass. The most densely populated area of the country is the south coast and the most sparsely populated is the north east section of the country. The fauna of Montenegro is predominantly shared with surrounding Balkan nations.

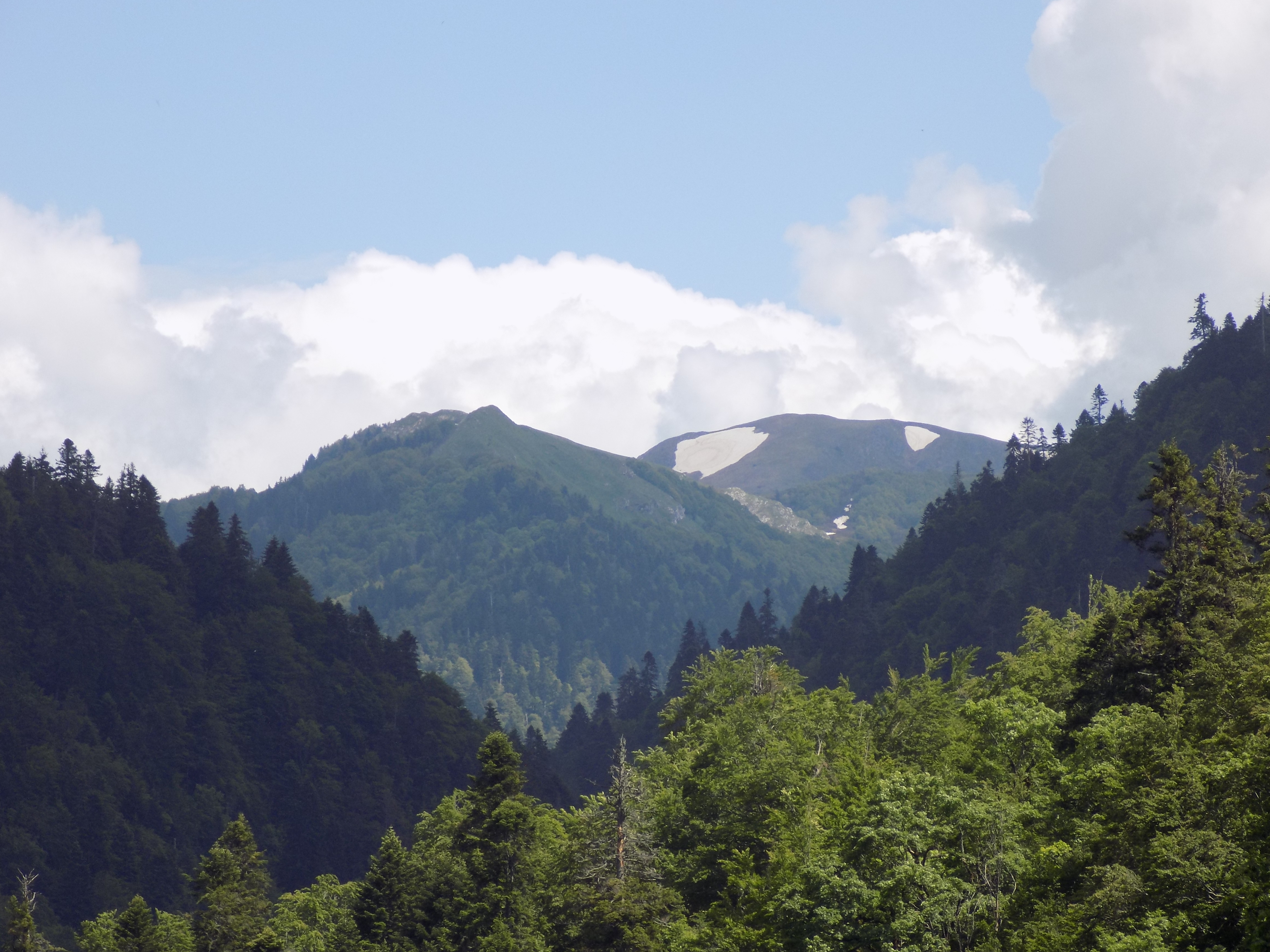
Biogradska gora National Park

Specific data on fauna in the region is difficult to locate due to the large concentration in mountainous and unpopulated areas. The nature of Montenegro also has an influence on the lack of data with nation becoming independent as recently as 2006. after a decision to leave the federation with Serbia that retained the title of Yugoslavia. As a new nation there was a lack of governing infrastructure, and this, along with a GDP per capita of $7,320 makes it one of Europe's poorer nations. There are resource limitations to devote to conservation and an existing census of land animals.

== Mammals ==
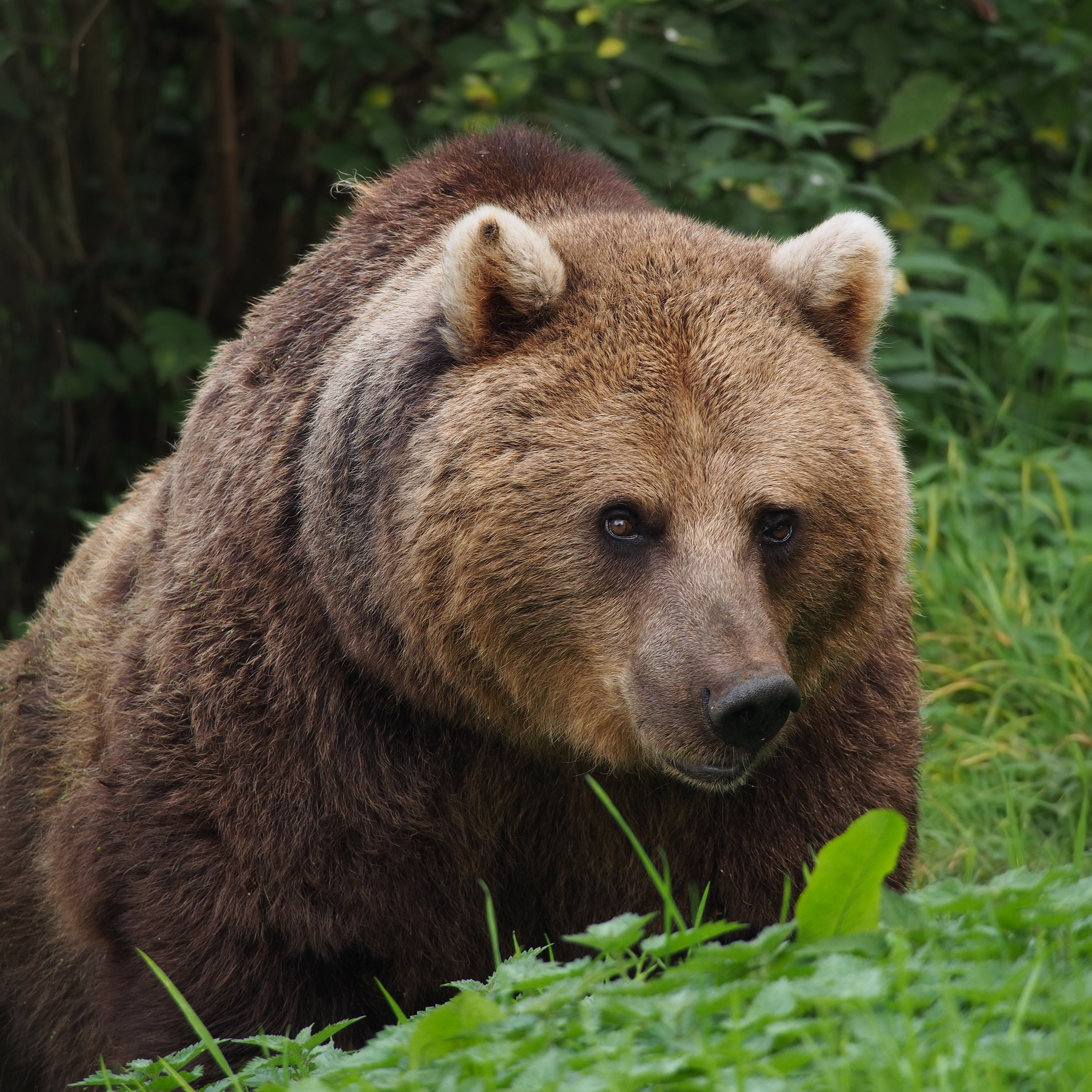
European brown bear

Within Montenegro, the largest concentration of large animals can be found within the north of the country. These higher numbers can be attributed to the areas being mountainous and containing a virgin forest. Brown bears can be found within this area of Montenegro, living within Biogradska Gora national park. There are estimated to be less than 130 individuals living in the wild. These bears are known to reach a weight of up to 200 kg and generally remain docile except for mating season.

Other carnivores such as wolves and Balkan lynxes live in the virgin forest as well, remaining distant from urban areas, this excludes occasional issues occurring from wolves hunting livestock. The Balkan Lynx along with other European species of lynx, remains critically endangered and there have been efforts from environmental organisations to increase protection and prevent extinction of the species. The Balkan lynx has an estimated population of between 40 and 70 individuals in the wild. It can be found in neighbouring countries such as Kosovo, North Macedonia and Albania. Its existence is under severe threat and only outside agencies such as the United Nations have been able to allocate some resources to saving the animal from likely extinction.

Among these larger carnivores is the golden jackal, wild dogs that retain a more slender build and lighter coat than wolves. The population of golden jackals have been reported as stable and increasing in Eastern Europe as there were previous fears about the species reaching extinction. Montenegro has two predominant species of deer, these are the red deer and the roe deer. Alongside these fauna in the mountains is the Balkan Chamois, a small mountain goat native to the Balkan mountain regions, which can be found in most mountainous areas of Montenegro. In more southern regions of the country smaller carnivores such as otters can be found. Otters are predominantly concentrated around Lake Skadar. 38.12% of Montenegro is made up of agricultural land. resulting in a range of domesticated mammals populating the country, these domesticated animals include large numbers of rabbits and livestock.

== Reptiles/Amphibians ==
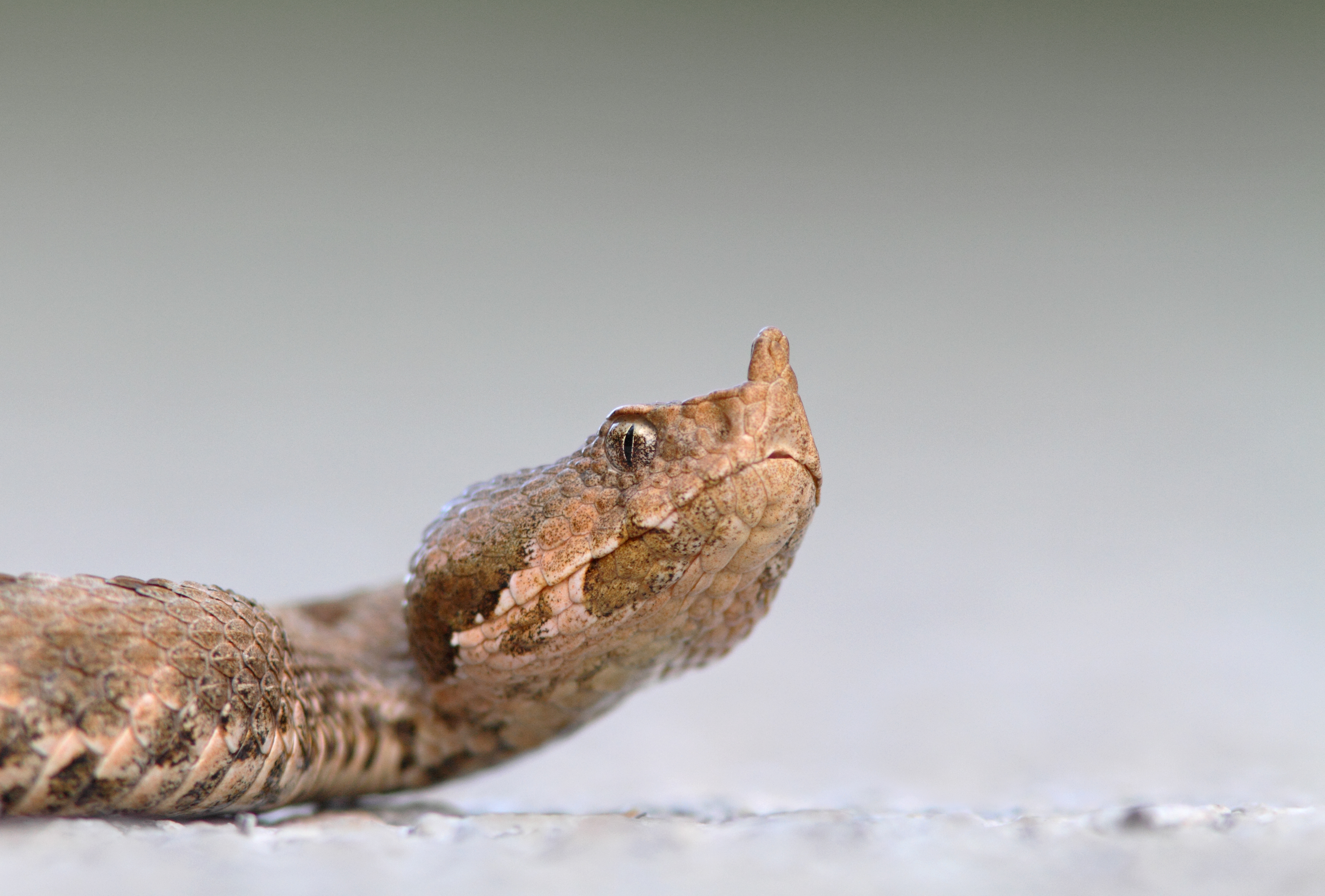
Nose-horned viper

Reptiles and amphibians make up an estimated 56 different species within Montenegro. Many of these are sub species of more common fauna such as the green frog and the crested newt. Some amphibians endemic to Montenegro have been known to undergo neoteny, such as the olm, a small amphibian existing within mountain cave systems of the Dinaric Alps. Caves and sinkholes are common within the region resulting in a variety of endemic fauna designed to live in these conditions. Around Lovćen exist common amphibians such as the Italian crested newt, blue lizard and several species of viper snakes. The Durmitor National Park is home to the Musor rock lizard and the sharp snouted lizard. Both species are native to Montenegro.

Another creature native to the region is the slow worm, this creature is commonly mistaken for a snake due to its physical attributes, but it is instead a harmless species of lizard. Montenegro is also home to a range of snakes such as the Balkan whip snake which remains harmless to humans, and the nose horned viper which is considered the most venomous snake in Europe. This snake has two distinctive horns above its head and exists predominantly in rocky areas through Southern Europe and the Middle East.

== Birds ==
Montenegro experiences wide varieties of birds due to its position along the Adriatic flyway. There are 352 species of birds found within the region. Specific information on these species can be found under Birds of Montenegro. There is limited data on the most common species of bird in Montenegro due to the fluctuating population caused by the Adriatic flyway. Bird populations have been threatened by hunting within the region. Many of the bird species along the Adriatic flyway rely on the marine biodiversity within Montenegro as a food source.

== Marine animals ==
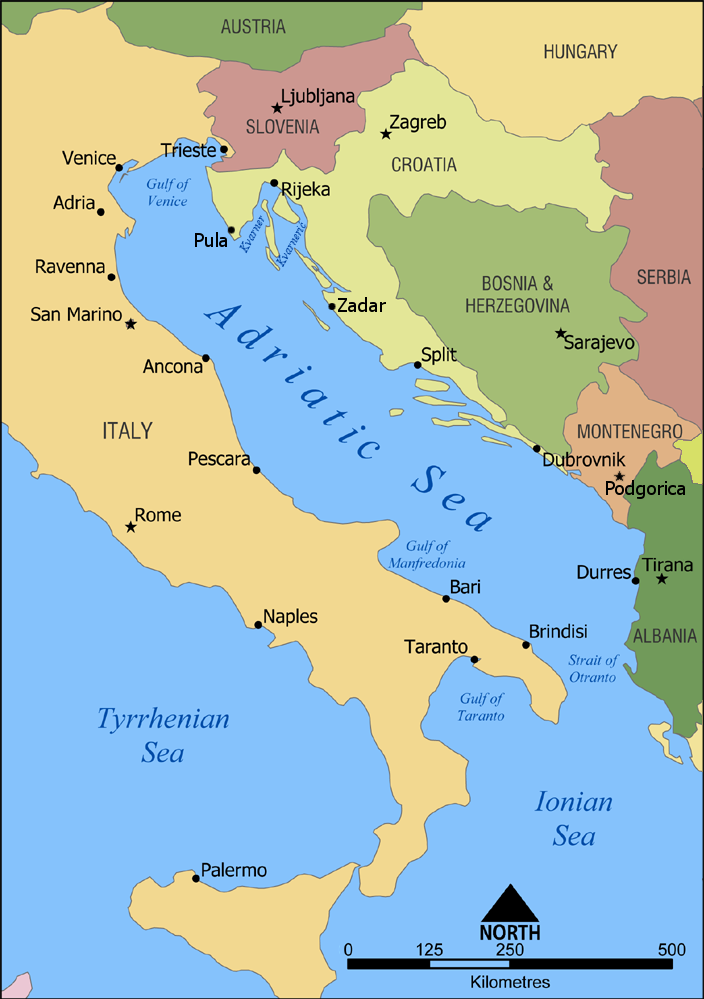
Adriatic Sea

Montenegro's geography consists of 293.5 km of coastline along with several large lakes. Montenegro's ocean zone reaches 22 kilometres off their coast reaching depths of over a kilometre. Within this area along the coastline of Montenegro are two kinds of dolphins, the striped dolphin and the bottle nose dolphin. The coastline does remain predominantly unexplored and there is limited data to suggest the exact number of marine animals in the Adriatic Sea with many species still being discovered. Between 2010 and 2014 twelve new fish species were recorded in the Adriatic Sea increasing the total number of known species to 452. Alongside this is three known species of sea turtles and four species of dolphin in the Montenegrin sector of the Adriatic Sea. The Bojana Estuary on the border of Montenegro and Albania produces a range of molluscs and other economically important species for the domestic fishing industry.

The more distinct Montenegrin fauna, is located in the subterranean climates that experience high levels of moisture and water flow. This includes gastropod fauna such as sea snails. These snails and other molluscs have been located in the springs bordering Lake Skadar.

== History ==
An excavation conducted between 2010 and 2014 in Northern Montenegro led to the discovery and analysis of animal species in the Pleistocene era. This era lasted from 2 588 000 BC till 11700 BC. Fossils were found in Northern Montenegro belonging to forest elephants and Stephanorhinus, descendants of elephants and rhinoceros. Further fossil data revealed fossils from families Hyaenidae and Felidae, the former being remnants of a large hyena and second being evidence of a sabre toothed cat. The excavation revealed data suggesting the presence of large fauna throughout Montenegro and the remainder of Eurasia throughout the course of the Pleistocene era.

== Threats to ecosystem ==
There are a range of factors that pose a risk to the degradation of the Montenegrin ecosystem. The coastal regions are threatened by the release of polluted water into the ocean as well as the discharge from boats in regions with high levels of tourism. A significant threat to wetland and water systems are the growth of algae in the water as a result of human settlement. Hunting associations pose a threat to some of the larger species of mammals. Due to the limited resources of the government, data surrounding larger mammals originates from these hunting societies. Other threats posed to the ecosystem of Montenegro include unregulated logging within forested areas. This is alongside the introduction of foreign species for commercial use. There are difficulties to resolving these issues such as a lack of organisation and financial resources from government entities within Montenegro. Another barrier is the lack of public awareness for the ramifications of environmental degradation.

Montenegro has recently made efforts to renewable energy with 13 privately owned hydro plants currently functioning within the country. These plants have contributed to rivers and springs drying up, posing a risk to the amphibian population and marine biodiversity. There have been efforts from activists to prevent the construction of more hydro plants as a means of protecting the marine ecosystem. Forestry became more common during World War II resulting in the degradation of large quantities of forestry.

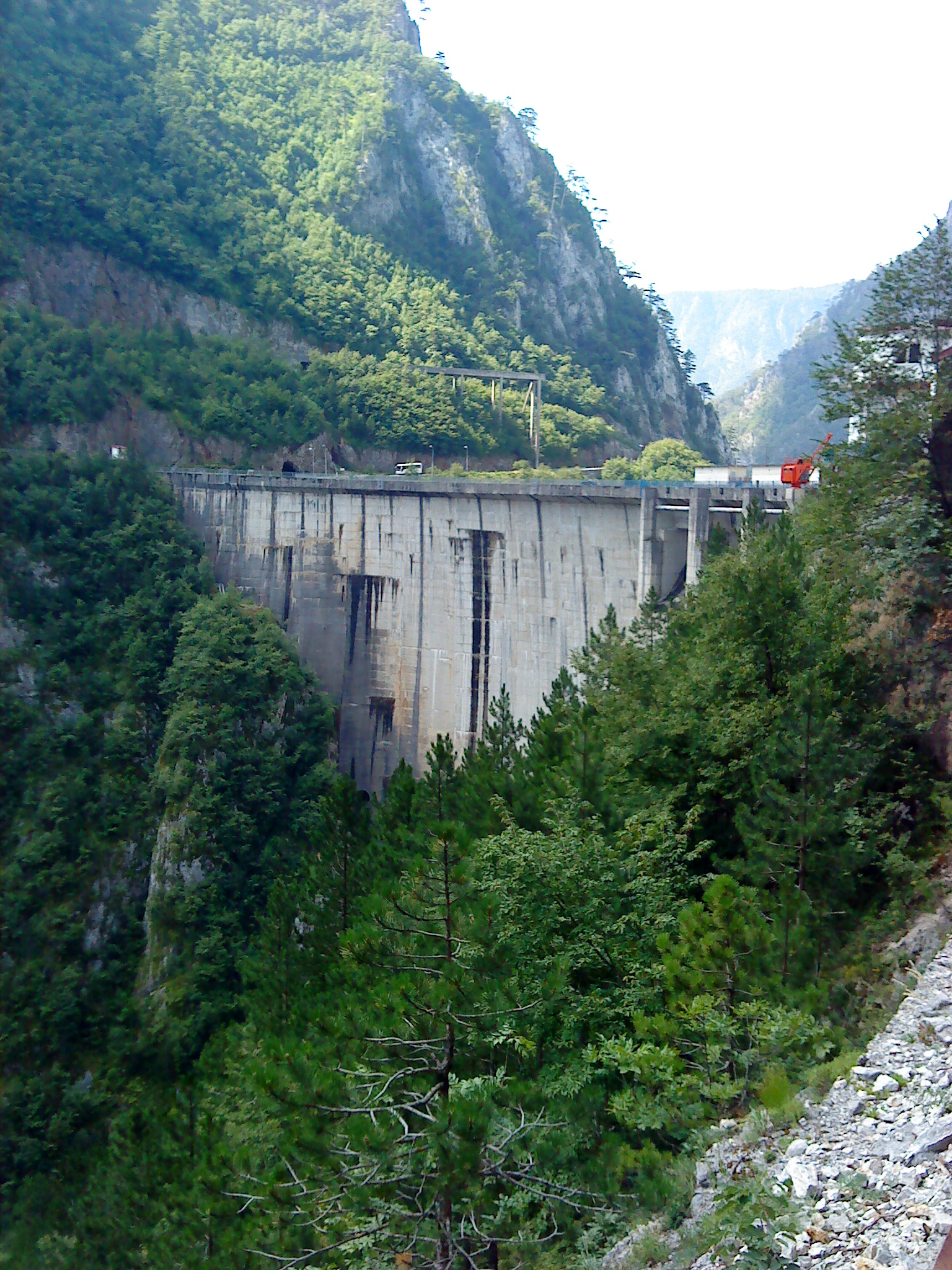
Mratinje Dam

== Conservation ==
While population data on the majority of Montenegro mammals remains ambiguous, conservation projects have taken place with the purpose of protecting the brown bear and Balkan lynx population within the region. In March 2019, the council for the management of the bear and wolf population was founded. This council works under European Union standards and aims to provide a more consistent data analysis of the bear and wolf population within Montenegro followed by intervention to reduce the pressure on these animals and their natural habitat. European Bear populations in the Dinaric-Pindos were reported as stable and increasing between 2012 and 2016.

Alongside this council exists efforts from the United Nations to protect the Balkan lynx population, this project is based in North Macedonia and seeks to reduce poaching of these lynxes throughout the Balkans. These conservation initiatives are part of a movement from the Montenegro government to increase awareness for their national fauna, with the council for the management of bear and wolf population serving as a condition of Montenegro's entry into the European Union. The Balkan Lynx population was recorded as stable between 2012 and 2016. There is increasing pressure on the government of Montenegro to conserve these larger mammals due to their extinction in other areas of Europe. This has occurred in southern regions of Spain where wolves have become extinct and the Iberian lynx remains critically endangered.

The World Wide Fund for Nature (WWF) has a branch in Adria aimed at protecting the marine biodiversity in the Adriatic Sea. WWF Adria works with governments, NGOs and fishermen within the region to establish sustainable ideas for long term protection of the flora and fauna in the Adriatic Sea. Subsequently, they aim to retain the health of rivers and waterbeds throughout inland Eastern Europe to prevent agricultural degradation as well as protect the wildlife that rely on these water sources. They currently carry out activism projects against the construction of further dams and hydro plants along the Morača River in Montenegro. WWF Adria also aims to increase the efficiency of government regulations on protected environmental areas as well as raising awareness for the protection of national parks and other areas of wide biodiversity.

== See also ==
List of endemic species of Montenegro

== Reference List ==
- A-z-animals.com. 2008. Animals In Montenegro. [online] Available at: https://a-z-animals.com/animals/location/europe/montenegro/
- Brigham, P., 2020. Balkan Snakes & More Snakes – BALKAN NEWS MAGAZINE. [online] The Balkan News Magazine. Available at: https://thebalkannewsmagazine.com/balkan-snakes-more-snakes-balkan-news-magazine/
- Cia.gov. 2020. Europe :: Montenegro — The World Factbook – Central Intelligence Agency. [online] Available at:
- Cross, D., 2019. Critically Endangered Balkan Lynxes Still Have A Fighting Chance. [online] Sustainability-times.com. Available at: https://www.sustainability-times.com/environmental-protection/saving-critically-endangered-balkan-lynxes-in-macedonia/
- Dulčić J and Lipej L (2015). The current status of the Adriatic sea fish biodiversity. Front. Mar. Sci. Conference Abstract: XV European Congress of Ichthyology. doi:10.3389/conf.fmars.2015.03.00073
- European Commission, 2016. Guidelines For Population Level Management Plans For Large Carnivores – Environment – European Commission. [online] Ec.europa.eu. Available at: https://ec.europa.eu/environment/nature/conservation/species/carnivores/conservation_status.htm
- Gastropoda, Moitessieriidae, and Hydrobiidae). Ecologica Montenegrina. 20. 71–90. 10.37828/em.2019.20.6.
- Grego, Jozef & Glöer, Peter & Falniowski, Andrzej & Hofman, Sebastian & Osikowski, Artur. (2019). New subterranean freshwater gastropod species from Montenegro (Mollusca,
- Schepers, F., 2017. Days Of The Jackal | Rewilding Europe. [online] Rewilding Europe. Available at: https://rewildingeurope.com/news/days-of-the-jackal/
- IUCN. 2017. A Brown Bear Wakes Up In Montenegro. [online] Available at: https://www.iucn.org/news/eastern-europe-and-central-asia/201705/brown-bear-wakes-montenegro
- Johnson, W., 2020. Pleistocene Epoch | Characteristics, Plants, Animals, Climate, & Facts. [online] Encyclopædia Britannica. Available at: https://www.britannica.com/science/Pleistocene-Epoch
- Kajosevic, S., 2019. Montenegrin Activists Urge End To Hydropower Plant Construction. [online] Balkan Insight. Available at: https://balkaninsight.com/2019/05/21/montenegrin-activists-urge-end-to-hydropower-plant-construction/
- Lepage, D., 2020. Montenegro Bird Checklist – Avibase – Bird Checklists Of The World. [online] Avibase.bsc-eoc.org. Available at: https://avibase.bsc-eoc.org/checklist.jsp?region=ME
- Ljubljana, M. and Belgrade, D., 2020. IUCN Red List Of Threatened Species: Golden Jackal. [online] IUCN Red List of Threatened Species. Available at: https://www.iucnredlist.org/species/118264161/133235906
- Lonely Planet, 2018. History Of Montenegro – Lonely Planet Travel Information. [online] Lonelyplanet.com. Available at: https://www.lonelyplanet.com/montenegro/history
- Lonely Planet. 2017. National Parks & Wildlife In Montenegro. [online] Available at: https://www.lonelyplanet.com/montenegro/background/other-features/819da208-179a-4f71-8916-dd22fafed037/a/nar/819da208-179a-4f71-8916-dd22fafed037/360151
- 'Ministry for Spatial Planning and Environment, 2010, National Biodiversity Strategy with the Action Plan for the period 2010 – 2015' Available at: https://www.cbd.int/doc/world/me/me-nbsap-01-en.pdf
- Parks Dinarides. 2019. Montenegro Established The Council For The Management Of The Bear And Wolf Population | Parks Dinarides. [online] Available at: http://www.discoverdinarides.com/en/news/news_of_parks_of_the_dinarides/montenegro_established_the_council_for_the_management_of_the_bear_and_wolf_population/
- Sherriff, L., 2019. Small Hydropower Plants Threaten Montenegro's Last Free-Flowing Rivers In A Bid For Cleaner Energy. [online] The World from PRX. Available at: https://theworld.org/stories/2019/11/12/small-hydropower-plants-threaten-montenegros-last-free-flowing-rivers-bid-cleaner
- UN Environment. 2018. Securing A Safe Haven For The Balkan Lynx. [online] Available at: https://www.unenvironment.org/news-and-stories/story/securing-safe-haven-balkan-lynx
- Uttam, M., 2018. Top 10 Poorest Countries In Europe. [online] Jagranjosh.com. Available at: https://www.jagranjosh.com/general-knowledge/top-10-poorest-countries-in-europe-1538044990-1
- Vislobokova, I., and A. Agadjanian. "New Data on Large Mammals of the Pleistocene Trlica Fauna, Montenegro, the Central Balkans." Paleontological Journal 49.6 (2015): 651–667.
- White, D. and Lloyd, T., 1994. Defining Old Growth: Implications For Management. [online] Fs.usda.gov. Available at: https://research.fs.usda.gov/treesearch/741
- Wilddocu.de. 2020. Balkan Chamois (Rupicapra Rupicapra Balcanica) |. [online] Available at: http://www.wilddocu.de/balkan-chamois-rupicapra-rupicapra-balcanica/
- Wildlifetrusts.org. 2020. Slow-Worm | The Wildlife Trusts. [online] Available at: https://www.wildlifetrusts.org/wildlife-explorer/reptiles/slow-worm
- WWF Adria, 2020. Main Activities Of WWF Adria. [online] WWF. Available at: https://wwf.panda.org/wwf_offices/wwf_adria.cfm
- WWF, 2010. Montenegro Relaunches Assault On Wild Beauty. [online] WWF. Available at: https://wwf.panda.org/?195853/Montenegro-relaunches-assault-on-wild-beauty

== Image References ==
- Biogradska Gora: BuhaM
- Brown Bear: Baresi Franco
- Nose-horned Viper: BouketenCate
- Adriatic Sea: NormanEinstein
- Mratinje Dam: Römert
