= List of marine molluscs of Croatia =

Location of Croatia

The marine molluscs of Croatia are a part of the molluscan fauna of Croatia (wildlife of Croatia).

A number of species of marine molluscs are found in the wild in Croatia.

Summary table of number of species.

	Croatia
polyplacophorans	??
marine gastropods	??
marine bivalves	??
scaphopods	??
cephalopods	??
marine molluscs altogether	??

== Marine gastropods ==
Hermaeidae

- Aplysiopsis elegans (Deshayes, 1853)

Aglajidae

- Chelidonura africana Pruvot-Fol, 1953

Aplysiidae

- Aplysia dactylomela Rang, 1828

== See also ==
- List of non-marine molluscs of Croatia

Lists of molluscs of surrounding countries:

- List of marine molluscs of Slovenia
- List of marine molluscs of Bosnia and Herzegovina
- List of marine molluscs of Montenegro
- List of marine molluscs of Italy (marine border)
