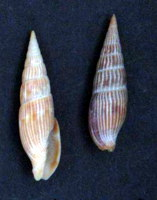
- Shells of Vexillum acuminatum (museum specimens at Naturalis Biodiversity Center)

Scientific classification
- Kingdom: Animalia
- Phylum: Mollusca
- Class: Gastropoda
- Subclass: Caenogastropoda
- Order: Neogastropoda
- Superfamily: Turbinelloidea
- Family: Costellariidae
- Genus: Vexillum
- Species: V. acuminatum

Binomial name
- Vexillum acuminatum (Gmelin, 1791)

Synonyms
- Mitra crebrilirata Reeve, 1844; Mitra elata Röding, P.F. 1798; Mitra layardii Adams, A. 1855; Mitra polita Reeve, 1844 junior subjective synonym; Mitra rosea Kiener, L.C. 1838-1839; Vexillum (Costellaria) acuminatum (Gmelin, 1791) accepted, alternate representation; Vexillum crebrilirata [sic] (incorrect gender ending); Vexillum crebriliratum (Reeve, 1844); Voluta acuminata Gmelin, 1791 (original combination)

= Vexillum acuminatum =

Species of gastropod

Vexillum acuminatum, common name the acuminate mitre, is a species of small sea snail, marine gastropod mollusk in the family Costellariidae, the ribbed miters.

== Description ==
The size of the shell varies between 12 mm and 42 mm.

== Distribution ==
This marine species occurs in the Indo-West Pacific; also off New Caledonia and Australia (Northern Territory, Queensland, Western Australia).
