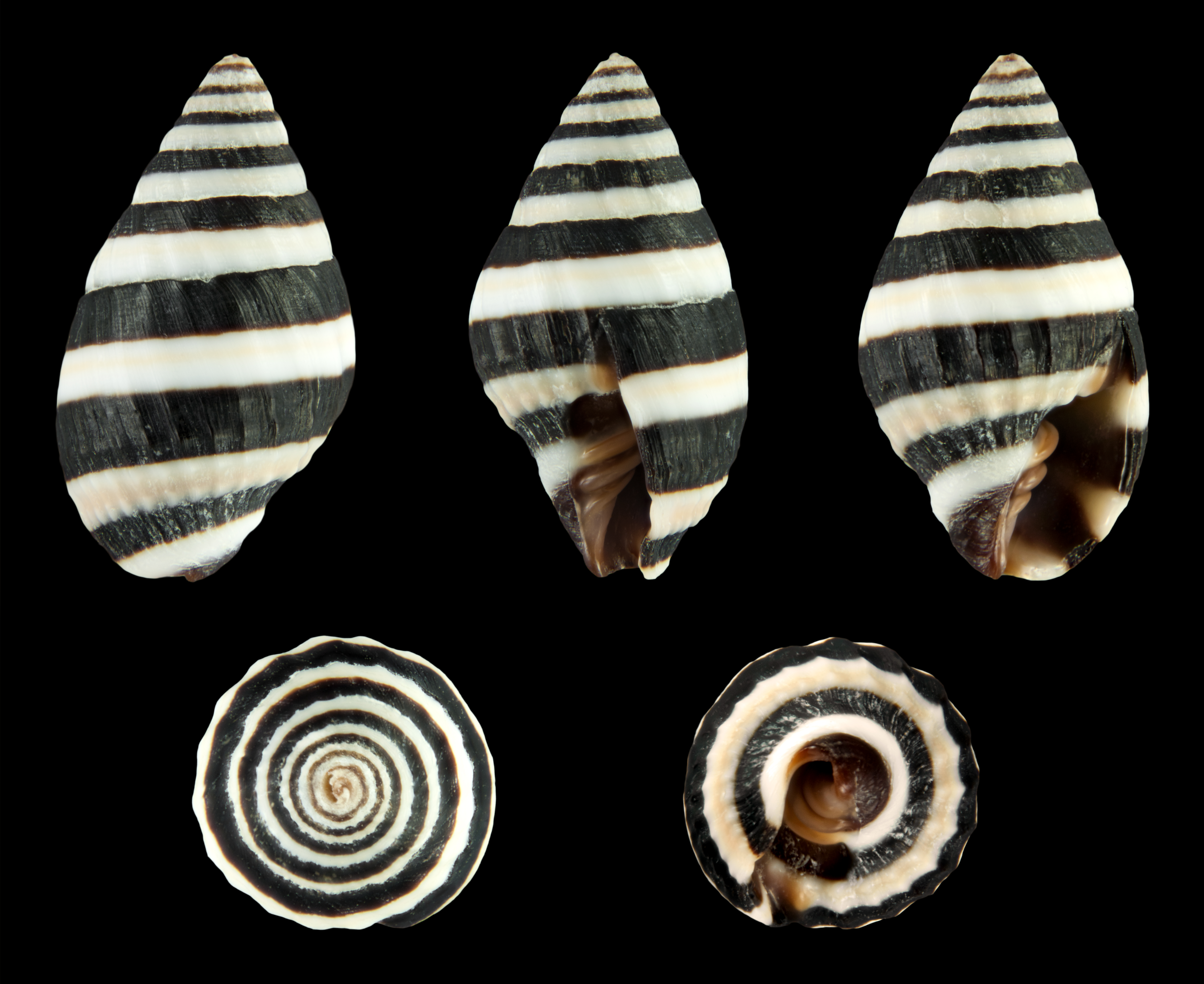

Scientific classification
- Kingdom: Animalia
- Phylum: Mollusca
- Class: Gastropoda
- Subclass: Caenogastropoda
- Order: Neogastropoda
- Family: Costellariidae
- Genus: Vexillum
- Species: V. luculentum

Binomial name
- Vexillum luculentum (Reeve, 1845)

Synonyms
- Mitra dichroa Adams & Reeve, 1850; Mitra graeffi Crosse, 1867; Mitra luculenta Reeve, 1845; Mitra tricolor Montrouzier, 1861; Mitra (Pusia) luculenta albida Dautzenberg, P. & Bouge, L.J. 1923; Mitra (Pusia) luculenta nigra Dautzenberg, P. & Bouge, L.J. 1923.; Pusia luculenta (Reeve, 1845)

= Vexillum luculentum =

Species of gastropod

Vexillum luculentum, common namee the clear mitre, is a species of small sea snail, marine gastropod mollusk in the family Costellariidae, the ribbed miters.

== Description ==
The length of the shell varies between 8 mm and 15 mm.

(Original description) The shell is ovate and smooth. It is longitudinally rather obsoletely plicately ribbed, ribs granose towards the base. The whorls are conspicuously painted with alternate blue-black and white zones. The columella is three-plaited.

== Distribution ==
This marine species occurs from the Philippines and in the Western Pacific off Fiji and Samoa; also off Queensland, Australia.
