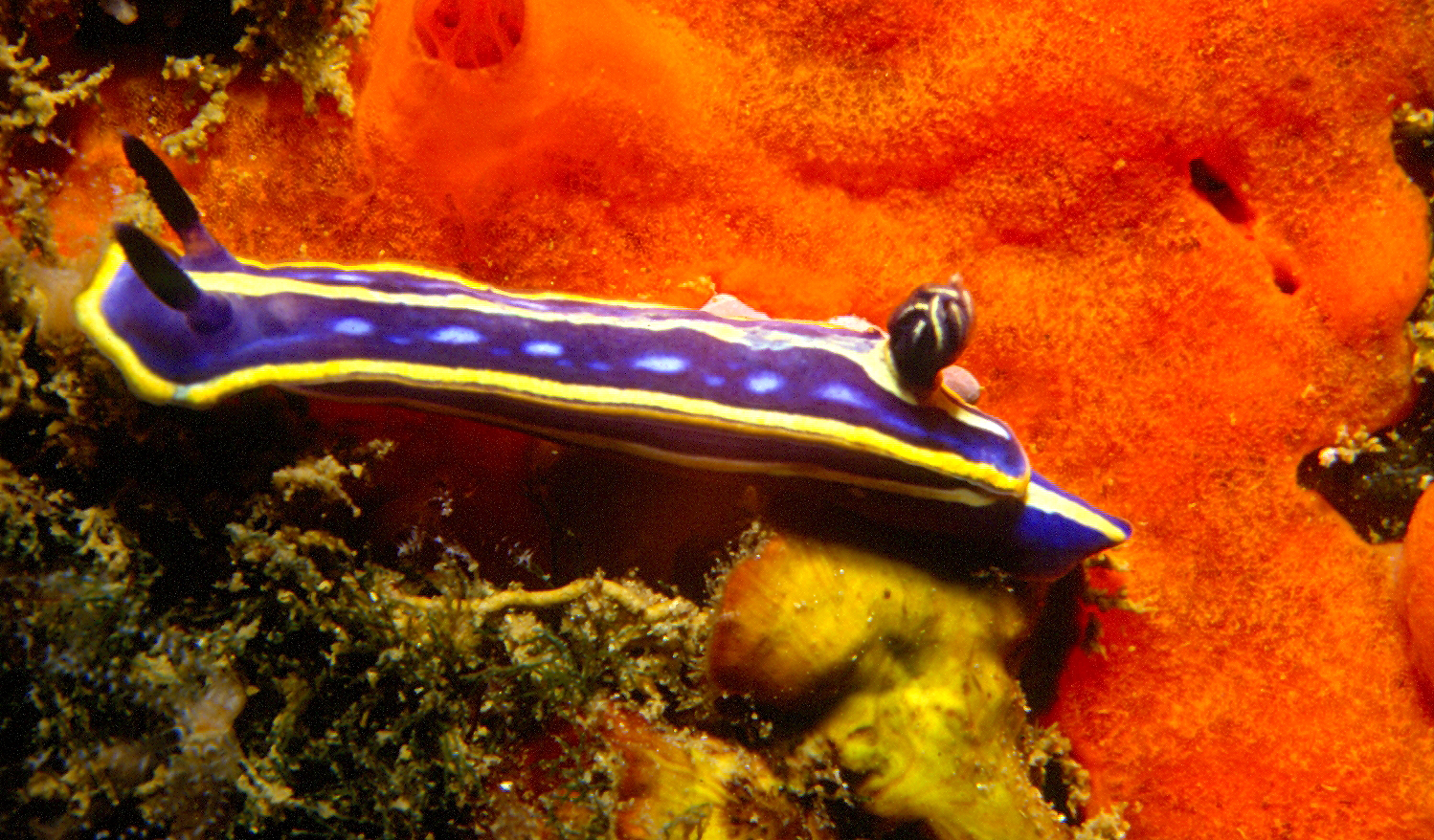

Scientific classification
- Kingdom: Animalia
- Phylum: Mollusca
- Class: Gastropoda
- Order: Nudibranchia
- Family: Chromodorididae
- Genus: Felimare
- Species: F. tricolor

Binomial name
- Felimare tricolor (Cantraine, 1835)

Synonyms
- Chromodoris tricolor (Cantraine, 1835); Doris tricolor Cantraine, 1835 (basionym); Felimare midatlantica (Gosliner, 1990); Glossodoris tricolor (Cantraine, 1835); Hypselodoris midatlantica Gosliner, 1990; Hypselodoris tricolor (Cantraine, 1835); Mexichromis tricolor (Cantraine, 1835)

= Felimare tricolor =

Species of gastropod

Felimare tricolor, or the tricolored felimare, is a colourful species of sea slug or dorid nudibranch, a marine gastropod mollusc in the family Chromodorididae.

== Synonymy ==
The original description of Doris tricolor was considered so poor by Gosliner that he considered that the name should be abandoned. Posteriorly Ortea, Valdes & Garcia-Gomez selected a neotype for Cantraine's Doris tricolor and synonymized with it Hypselodoris midatlantica Gosliner, 1990. Ortea et al.'s neotype selection is contested by Gosliner (see http://www.seaslugforum.net/find/3807), and thus, there are different opinions on the valid name for the taxonomical species involved. Overall, the European school uses Hypselodoris tricolor and the American school uses Hypselodoris midatlantica. As the neotype designation has not been rejected by the ICZN, we follow here the traditional European usage.

== Distribution ==
Cantraine described this species from the Strait of Bonifacio and the Adriatic Sea. This nudibranch is reported from the Western Mediterranean to the Eastern Atlantic Ocean.

== Description ==
The original description reads:

Doris corpore elongato, levissimo, caeruleo; dorso tribus lineis longitudinalibus notato, duobus lateralibus aurantiacis, media albida. - Longit. 4 lin.

In 1841 Cantraine expanded on this and gave an illustration.

Felimare tricolor has a blue body with a yellow-orange line running along the edge of the mantle. There is a single central white-yellow line along the midline of the mantle and paler blue diffuse patches between this line and the sides. The gills are dark blue with a single white line along the midline which becomes more prominent at the tip of each gill. The rhinophores are dark blue with a paler tip but with no yellow or white markings. There is some variation in colour between individuals and regions. The development of the colour pattern is described by Ortea et al.

This species can reach a total length of at least 35 mm and has been observed feeding on sponges from the genus Dysidea as well as Scalarispongia scalaris.
