= Doris bertheloti =

Scientific classification
- Kingdom: Animalia
- Phylum: Mollusca
- Class: Gastropoda
- Order: Nudibranchia
- Family: Dorididae
- Genus: Doris
- Species: D. bertheloti

Binomial name
- Doris bertheloti (d'Orbigny, 1839)

Synonyms
- Doridigitata bertheloti d'Orbigny, 1839

Species of gastropod

Doris bertheloti is a species of sea slug, a dorid nudibranch, a marine gastropod mollusk in the family Dorididae.

== Distribution ==
This species was described from the Canary Islands. It has been reported from the Mediterranean Sea and Senegal.
