= Planispiral =

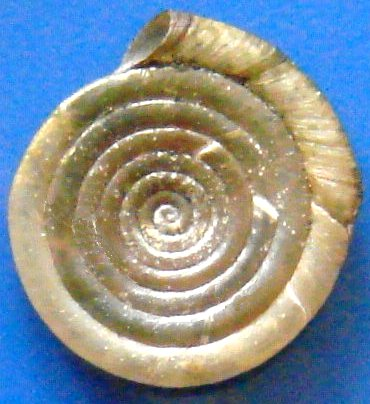
View of the spire side of the planispiral shell of the freshwater snail Anisus septemgyratus. This shell has seven and a half whorls

Planispiral is a condition in which a tubicolous shell is coiled in a single horizontal plane and the diameter increases away from the axis of coiling. This term is usually used for describing gastropod shells. Many cephalopods and tubeworms can also have a planispiral shell (Allaby and Allaby, 1999).
