= Platynereis dumerilii =

Scientific classification
- Kingdom: Animalia
- Phylum: Annelida
- Clade: Pleistoannelida
- Subclass: Errantia
- Order: Phyllodocida
- Family: Nereididae
- Genus: Platynereis
- Species: P. dumerilii

Binomial name
- Platynereis dumerilii (Audouin & Milne-Edwards, 1834)

Synonyms
- List: Eunereis africana Treadwell, 1943; Heteronereis fucicola Örsted, 1843; Heteronereis maculata Bobretzky, 1868; Heteronereis malmgreni Claparède, 1868; Iphinereis fucicola (Örsted, 1843); Leontis dumerilii (Audouin & Milne Edwards, 1833); Leptonereis maculata Treadwell, 1928; Mastigonereis quadridentata Schmarda, 1861; Mastigonereis striata Schmarda, 1861; Nereilepas variabilis Örsted, 1843; Nereis (Platynereis) dumerilii Audouin & Milne Edwards, 1833; Nereis (Platynereis) dumerilii striata (Schmarda, 1861); Nereis (Platynereis) striata (Schmarda, 1861); Nereis agilis Keferstein, 1862; Nereis alacris Verrill, 1880; Nereis antillensis McIntosh, 1885; Nereis dumerilii Audouin & Milne Edwards, 1833; Nereis glasiovi Hansen, 1882; Nereis gracilis Hansen, 1882; Nereis megodon Quatrefages, 1866; Nereis peritonealis Claparède, 1868; Nereis taurica Grube, 1850; Nereis zostericola Örsted, 1843; Platynereis dumerili [lapsis]; Platynereis jucunda Kinberg, 1865; Platynereis striata (Schmarda, 1861); Uncinereis lutea Treadwell, 1928; Uncinereis trimaculosa Treadwell, 1940

Species of annelid worm

Female epitoke of Platynereis dumerilii: Its body is filled with yellow eggs.

Male epitoke of Platynereis dumerilii: Its frontal part is filled with white sperm, while its rear is red due to blood vessels.

Platynereis dumerilii is a species of annelid polychaete worm. It was originally placed into the genus Nereis and later reassigned to the genus Platynereis. Platynereis dumerilii lives in coastal marine waters from temperate to tropical zones. It can be found in a wide range from the Azores, the Mediterranean, in the North Sea, the English Channel, and the Atlantic down to the Cape of Good Hope, in the Black Sea, the Red Sea, the Persian Gulf, the Sea of Japan, the Pacific, and the Kerguelen Islands. Platynereis dumerilii is today an important lab animal, it is considered a living fossil, and it is used in many phylogenetic studies as a model organism.

== Description ==
Platynereis dumerilii is a small marine ragworm: Males reach a length of 2 to 3 cm, while females reach a length of 3 to 4 cm. Like a number of invertebrate phyla, Platynereis dumerilii has an axochord, a paired longitudinal muscle that displays striking similarities to the notochord regarding position, developmental origin, and expression profile. Its early trochophore larva has a pair of the simplest eyes in the animal kingdom, each eye consists only of a photoreceptor cell and a pigment cell.

=== Locomotion ===
P. dumerilii worms have a ciliated surface which beats synchronously to drive locomotion and fluid flow. Larvae have segmental multiciliated cells that regularly display spontaneous coordinated ciliary arrests, which compose the ciliomotor circuitry in the worms. Whole-body coordination of ciliary locomotion is performed by a "stop-and-go pacemaker system".

As the worms develop, they use chaetae, and then parapodia, for locomotion. Unlike other polychaetes, in Platynereis larvae, the parapodia are used only for navigation while the cilia are responsible for propulsive force.

== Senses ==
=== Photoreceptor cells ===
Platynereis dumerilii larvae possess two kinds of photoreceptor cells: Rhabdomeric and ciliary photoreceptor cells.

The ciliary photoreceptor cells are located in the deep brain of the larva. They are not shaded by pigment and thus perceive non-directional light. The ciliary photoreceptor cells resemble molecularly and morphologically the rods and cones of the human eye. Additional, they express an ciliary opsin that is more similar to the visual ciliary opsins of vertebrate rods and cones than to the visual rhabdomeric opsins of invertebrates. Therefore, it is thought that the urbilaterian, the last common ancestor of mollusks, arthropods, and vertebrates already had ciliary photoreceptor cells. The ciliary opsin is UV-sensitive (λ_{max} = 383 nm), and the ciliary photoreceptor cells react on non-directional UV-light by making the larvae swimming down. This forms a ratio-chromatic depth-gauge with phototaxis of the rhabdomeric photoreceptor cells of the eyes.

A rhabdomeric photoreceptor cell forms with a pigment cell a simple eye. A pair of these eyes mediate phototaxis in the early Platynereis dumerilii trochophore larva. In the later nectochaete larva, phototaxis is mediated by the more complex adult eyes. The adult eyes express at least three opsins: Two rhabdomeric opsins and a Go-opsin. The three opsins there mediate phototaxis all the same way via depolarization, even so a scallop Go-opsin is known to hyperpolarize.

=== Chemical ===
P. dumerilii senses chemicals with four types of organs: The antennae, the palps, the nuchal organs, and the tentacular cirri. These organs detect food and chemical cues such as alcohols, esters, amino acids, and sugars.

Among the four types, the antennae are the primary chemosensory organs and sense a broad range of chemicals, while the palps are specialized on taste, which means they detect food-related chemicals. The cirri are thin thread-like head appendages and are specialized in tactile sensation, but can also give spatial information from were a chemical cue is coming, since a single stimulus can elicit in the left and right cirrus a response at a different times. The cirri also sense light: When they are shaded, the worm retreats rapidly into its tube to protect them. This behavior is called a shadow reflex. The nuchal organ is a singular ciliated pit in P. dumerilii. Among annelids, nuchal organs are conserved and seem to have an important chemosensory function. However, what their exact function is, is still unclear.

The signals from the four chemosensory organs are processed in a lateral region and in the mushroom bodies. The mushroom bodies in annelids resemble those in insects by anatomy, morphology and gene expression. So probably, annelids and insects inherited mushroom bodies from their last common ancestor.

== Habitat ==
Platynereis dumerilii builds tubes on its substrate. The substrate may be algae-covered hard bottoms, sea grass, pelagic Sargassum rafts in the Sargasso Sea, or even rotting plant debris. Platynereis dumerilii commonly lives in depths of 0 to 5 meters, and so is typical for shallow bright infra-littoral environments. However, it has been also found on a buoy at 50 meters and on rotting seaweed at 100 m. It may also live in less favorable environments, like at thermal vents or polluted areas near sewer outfall pipes. It dominates polluted areas and acidic areas with pH values around 6.5 fitting the preferred pH value of a subpopulation of late Platynereis dumerilii nectochaete larvae. Larvae feed on plankton, and migrate vertically in the ocean in response to changes in light, causing a daily transport of biomass.

== Reproduction and development ==
Platynereis dumerilii is dioecious, that means it has two separate sexes. Changes in light are importantly linked to reproduction. The bristle worm is originally found in the Bay of Naples, where it displays reproductive synchrony. The adult worms rise en masse to the water surface a few days after the full moon, during a one- to two-hour dark portion of the night between sunset and moonrise. In the worm's natural environment, it is important to synchronize spawning to increase the potential for gametes to meet and fertilize. By detecting nighttime lighting in accordance with the lunar cycle, the worms synchronize reproductive activity. Worms that make L-Cry protein are better able to detect appropriate light conditions and synchronize the release of gametes. In addition, the molecule r-Opsin is extremely sensitive to light, and appears to help detect moonrise. Some combination of signals from r-Opsin and L-Cry is believed to help the worms to coordinate rising at a common time to spawn.

During mating, the male swims around the female while the female is swimming in small circles. Both release eggs and sperm into the water. This release is triggered by sexual pheromones. The eggs are then fertilized outside of the body in the water. Like other Nereidids, Platynereis dumerilii has no segmental gonades, the oocytes mature freely swimming in the body cavity (coelom), and stain the body of the mature female epitoke yellow.

Platynereis dumerilii develops very stereotypically between batches and therefore time can be used to stage Platynereis dumerilii larvae. However, the temperature influences the speed of development greatly. Therefore, the following developmental times are given with 18 °C as reference temperature:

After 24 hours, a fertilized egg gives rise to a trochophore larva. At 48 hours, the trochophore larva becomes a metatrochophore larva. Both trochophore and metatrochophore swim with a ring of cilia in the water and are positively phototactic. The metatrochophore has, beside the larval eyes, already the anlagen for the more complex adult eyes of the adult worm. A day later, at 72 hours after fertilization, the metatrochophore larva becomes a nectochaete larva. The nectochaete larva already has three segments, each with a pair of parapodia bearing chaetae, which serve for locomotion. The nectochaete larva can switch from positive to negative phototaxis. After five to seven days, the larvae start feeding and develop on their own speed, depending on food supply. After three to four weeks, when six segments have formed, the head is formed.

Normal development is subdivided into 16 stages. Platynereis dumerilii lives for 3 up to 18 months with an average lifespan of seven months. P. dumerilii reproduces only once, and dies after delivering its gametes.

== Genome ==
The genome of Platynereis dumerilii is diploid (2n chromosomes) with a haploid set of n = 14 chromosomes. It contains approximately 1 Gbp (giga base pairs) or 10^{9} base pairs. This genome size is close to the average observed for other animals. However, compared to many classical invertebrate molecular model organisms, this genome size is rather large and therefore it is a challenge to identify gene regulatory elements that can be far away from the corresponding promoter. But it is intron rich unlike those of Drosophila melanogaster and Caenorhabditis elegans and thus closer to vertebrate genomes including the human genome.

Bristle worms contain the complex protein haemoglobin, found in vertebrates, annelids (e.g. earthworms), molluscs (e.g. pond snails) and crustaceans (e.g. daphnia). It was once believed that haemoglobin must have evolved multiple times to be a feature of such different species.Comparing bristle worms with other red blooded species suggests that all forms of haemoglobins are derived from a single ancestral gene, cytoglobin.
