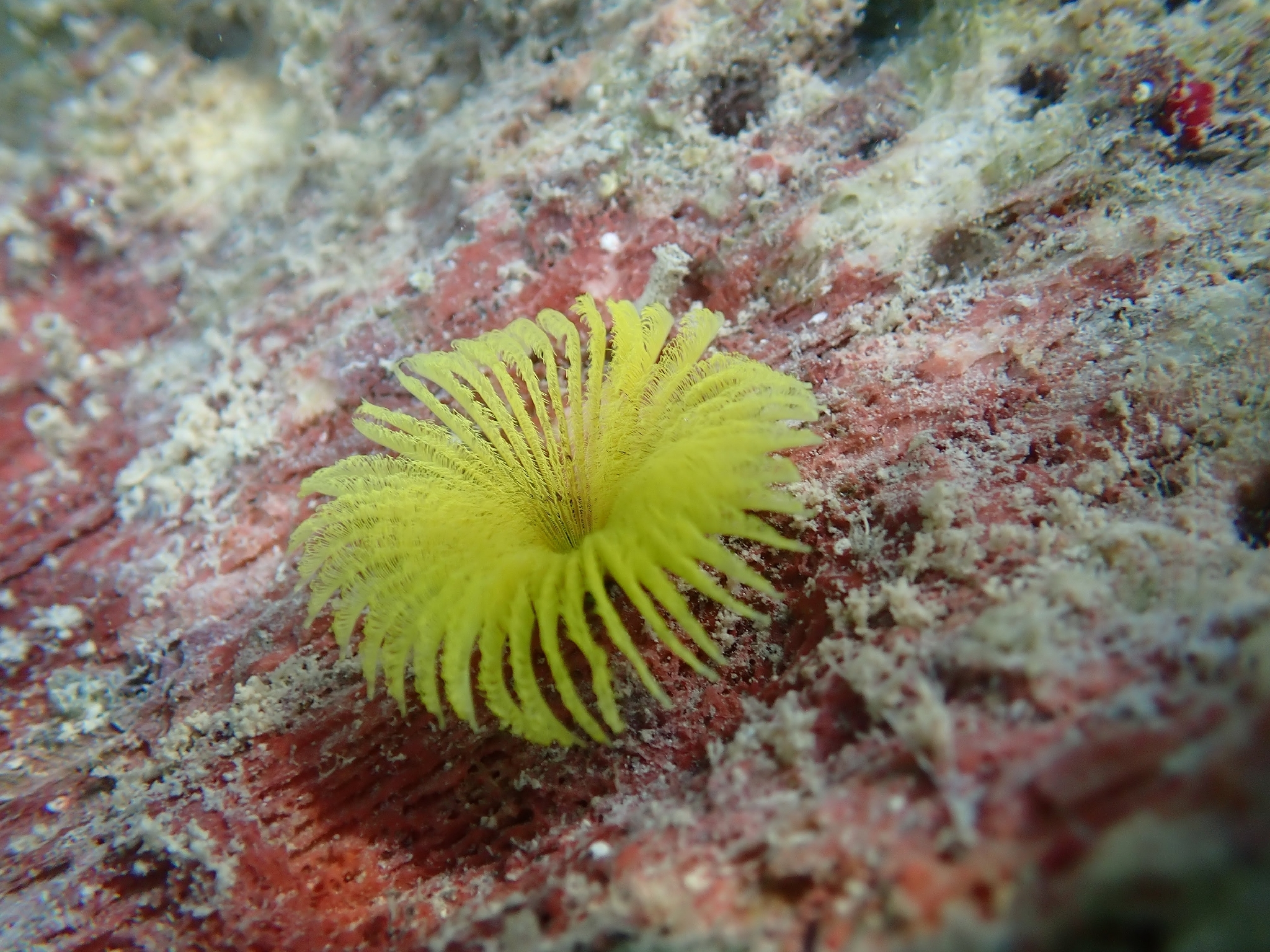

Scientific classification
- Kingdom: Animalia
- Phylum: Annelida
- Clade: Pleistoannelida
- Clade: Sedentaria
- Order: Sabellida
- Family: Sabellidae
- Genus: Notaulax
- Species: N. occidentalis

Binomial name
- Notaulax occidentalis Baird, 1865

Synonyms
- Hypsicomus purpureus Treadwell, 1924; Parasabella sulfurea Treadwell, 1917; Sabella alba Treadwell, 1917; Sabella occidentalis Baird, 1865

= Notaulax occidentalis =

Species of annelid

Notaulax occidentalis, commonly known as the yellow fanworm, is a species of feather duster worm found among coral reefs in the Caribbean and tropical Pacific from depths of 2 to 21 meters.

== Description ==
The yellow fan worm builds a soft tube that is embedded in the reef substrate to which the worm is attached. Although its body remains hidden in the tube, the organism can be recognized by its conspicuous, fan-shaped plume of feathery yellow tentacles, which it uses for both suspension feeding and respiration. The plume can reach a diameter of 5 cm. Like other sabellids, N. occidentalis can rapidly withdraw its plume into the tube when disturbed.

== Natural history ==
The yellow fan worm feeds on plankton or small organisms. Like other polychaete tube worms, N. occidentalis reproduce sexually through epitoky. Here, the sexually immature worm is modified or transformed into a sexually mature worm. In a behavior known as swarming, sexually mature males and females aggregate and shed gametes for fertilization once the females release a pheromone to initiate the process. Fertilized eggs develop into trochophores, or free-swimming larvae, which metamorphose into juveniles.
