= Vexillum cosmani =

Scientific classification
- Kingdom: Animalia
- Phylum: Mollusca
- Class: Gastropoda
- Subclass: Caenogastropoda
- Order: Neogastropoda
- Superfamily: Turbinelloidea
- Family: Costellariidae
- Genus: Vexillum
- Species: V. cosmani

Binomial name
- Vexillum cosmani (Kay, 1979)

Synonyms
- Vexillum (Costellaria) cosmani Kay, 1979

Species of gastropod

Vexillum cosmani is a species of small sea snail, marine gastropod mollusk in the family Costellariidae, the ribbed miters. It is a non-broadcast spawner, meaning the species reproduce through internal fertilization and carries the eggs until they are more developed before releasing them. Its life cycle does not include a trocophore stage.

== Description ==
The length of the shell attains 7.9 mm.

== Distribution ==
This marine species can be found in the eastern central Pacific Ocean and French Polynesia. It is mostly found off the coast of Hawaii.
