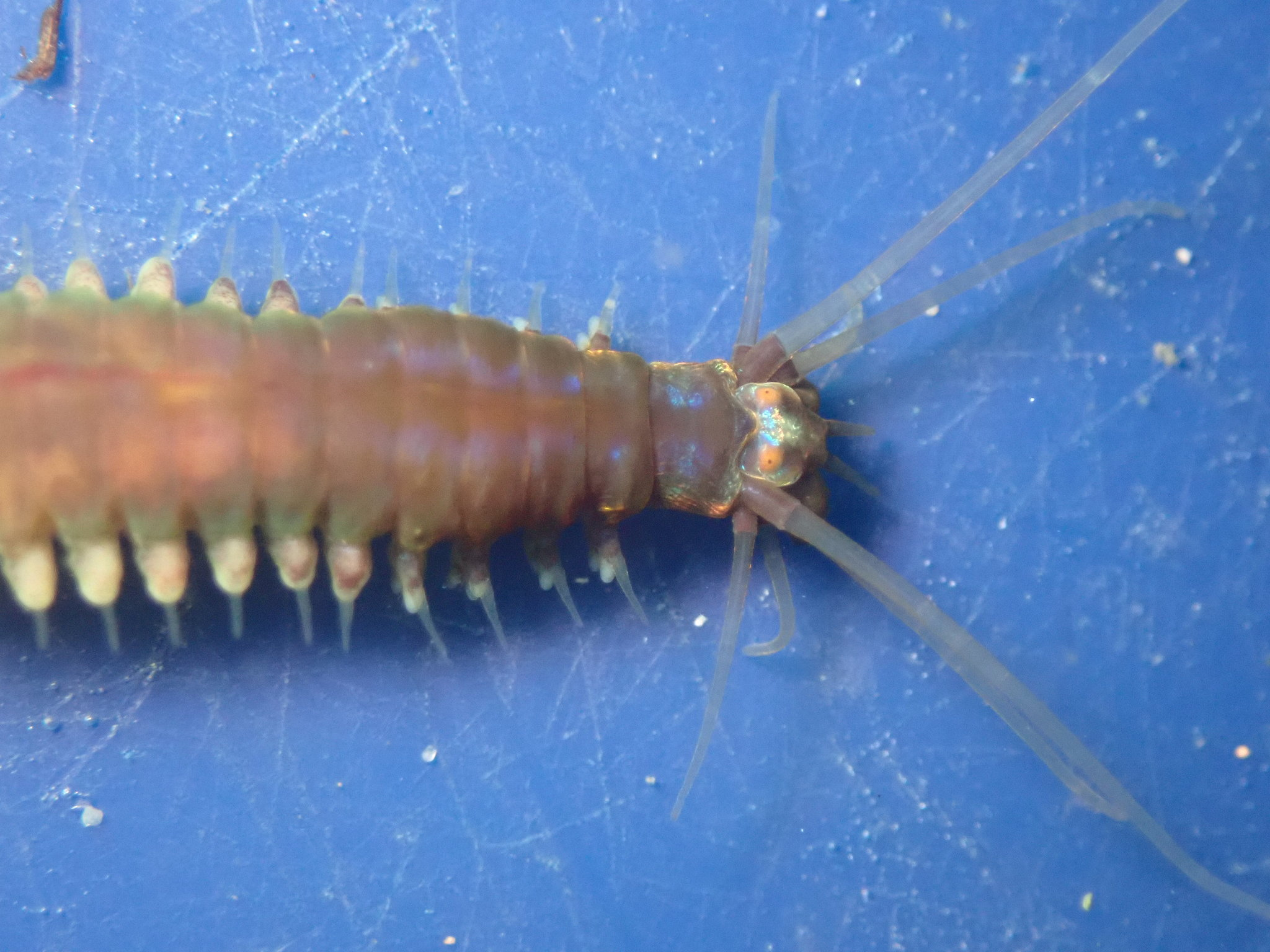

Scientific classification
- Kingdom: Animalia
- Phylum: Annelida
- Clade: Pleistoannelida
- Subclass: Errantia
- Order: Phyllodocida
- Family: Nereididae
- Genus: Platynereis
- Species: P. bicanaliculata

Binomial name
- Platynereis bicanaliculata Baird, 1863

= Platynereis bicanaliculata =

Species of marine polychaete worm

Platynereis bicanaliculata is a species of marine polychaete worm in the family Nereididae.

== Distribution and habitat ==
Platynereis bicanaliculata has been observed along the coasts of several continents and islands of the Pacific Ocean; from Australia in the South Pacific to Japan and Taiwan in the North, Hawai'i in the Central Pacific, and North America from the Aleutian Islands to Baja California in the East. The species can be found in soft-bottomed bays and sounds, such as the Puget Sound and the San Francisco Bay, as well as protected rocky habitats along the open coastline, according to in situ observations. It is a generally benthic species, and is most commonly found in shallow water.

== Description ==
Platynereis bicanaliculata ranges widely in color from white, pink, yellow, orange, green, or brown, often appearing to have an iridescent sheen. It has thick, conical parapodia. Its notopodia have simple, dark brown, two-lobed falcigers (setae) with hooked tips. Like other nereids, Platynereis bicanaliculata has two paired jaws in an eversible pharynx, with ridged paragnaths and 6–7 sclerotized "teeth" on the surface of the pharynx. Other defining characteristics include its slender, tentacular cirri.

== Ecology ==
=== Diet ===
Gut content investigations revealed that, like most nereids, Platynereis bicanaliculata is omnivorous and mostly feeds on algae and diatoms.

=== Reproduction ===
Like most polychaetes, Platynereis bicanaliculata is a gonochoric species. Nereid polychaete worms like Platynereis bicanaliculata reproduce via epitoky, a process in which mature individuals transition from benthic to pelagic, swimming organisms by undergoing dramatic changes in body and behavior, to distribute their gametes into the free water column. Many nereid species die after a single reproduction phase.
