= Torsion (gastropod) =

Novel characteristic of larval gastropods

Torsion is a gastropod synapomorphy which occurs in all gastropods during larval development. Torsion is the rotation of the visceral mass, mantle, and shell 180˚ with respect to the head and foot of the gastropod. The twisting is always in an anti-clockwise direction (when viewing the animal from above). This rotation brings the mantle cavity and the anus to an anterior position above the head.

In some groups of gastropods (Opisthobranchia) there is a degree of secondary detorsion or rotation towards the original position; this may be only partial detorsion or full detorsion.

The torsion or twisting of the visceral mass of larval gastropods is not the same thing as the spiral coiling of the shell, which is also present in many shelled gastropods.

== Development ==
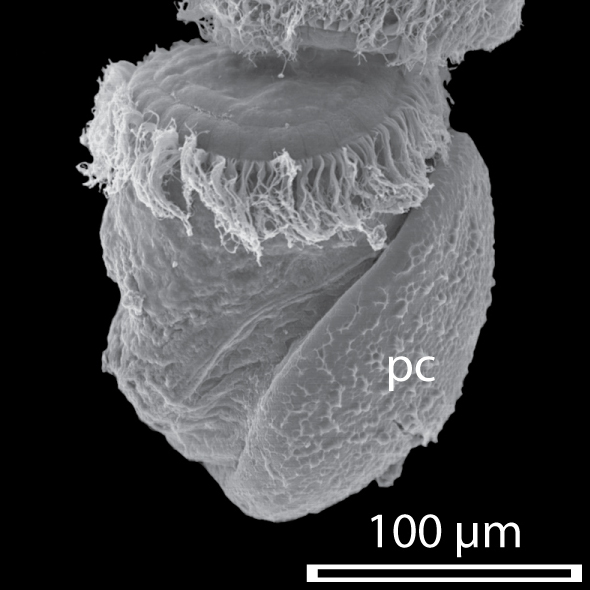
Trochophore of Haliotis asinina with calcified protoconch (pc) prior to torsion.

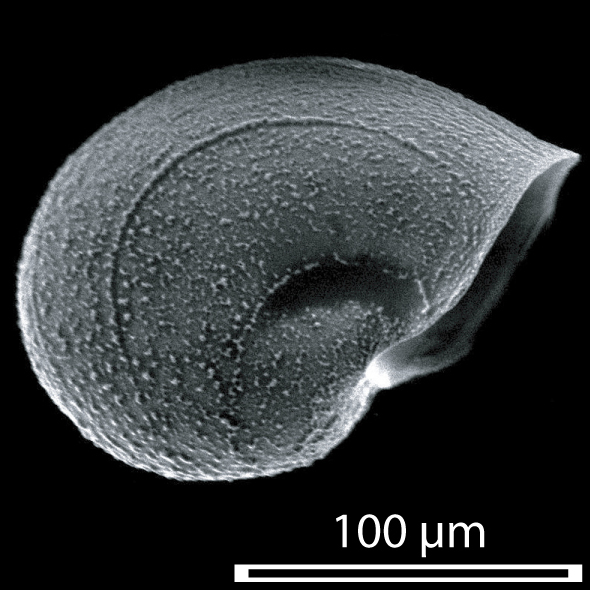
Protoconch of Haliotis asinina when the torsion is complete.

There are two different developmental stages which cause torsion. The first stage is caused by the development of the asymmetrical velar/foot muscle which has one end attached to the left side of the shell and the other end has fibres attached to the left side of the foot and head. At a certain point in larval development this muscle contracts, causing an anticlockwise rotation of the visceral mass and mantle of roughly 90˚. This process is very rapid, taking from a few minutes to a few hours. After this transformation the second stage of torsion development is achieved by differential tissue growth of the left hand side of the organism compared to the right hand side. This second stage is much slower and rotates the visceral mass and mantle a further 90˚. Detorsion is brought about by reversal of the above phases.

During torsion the visceral mass remains almost unchanged anatomically. There are, however, other important changes to other internal parts of the gastropod. Before torsion the gastropod has an euthyneural nervous system, where the two visceral nerves run parallel down the body. Torsion results in a streptoneural nervous system, where the visceral nerves cross over in a figure of eight fashion. As a result, the parietal ganglions end up at different heights. Because of differences between the left and right hand sides of the body, there are different evolutionary pressures on left and right hand side organs and as a result in some species there are considerable differences. Some examples of this are: in the ctenidia (equivalent to lungs or gills) in some species, one side may be reduced or absent; or in some hermaphrodite species the right hand renal system has been transformed into part of the reproductive system.

== Evolutionary roles ==
The original advantage of torsion for gastropods is unclear. It is further complicated by potential problems that accompany torsion. For example, having the place where wastes are excreted positioned above the head could result in fouling of the mouth and sense organs. Nevertheless, the diversity and success of the gastropods suggests torsion is advantageous, or at least has no strong disadvantages.

One likely candidate for the original purpose of torsion is defence against predators in adult gastropods. By moving the mantle cavity over the head, the gastropod can retract its vulnerable head into its shell. Some gastropods can also close the entrance to their shell with a tough operculum, a door-like structure which is attached to the dorsal surface of their foot. In evolutionary terms, the appearance of an operculum occurred shortly after that of torsion, which suggests a possible link with the role of torsion, though there is not sufficient evidence for or against this hypothesis. The English zoologist Walter Garstang wrote a famous poem in 1928, The Ballad of the Veliger, in which he argued with gentle humour in favour of the defence theory, including the lines

Predaceous foes, still drifting by in numbers unabated,
Were baffled now by tactics which their dining plans frustrated.
Their prey upon alarm collapsed, but promptly turned about,
With the tender morsel safe within and the horny foot without!

Torsion can provide other advantages. For aquatic gastropods, anterior positioning of the mantle cavity may be useful for preventing sediment getting into the mantle cavity, an event which is more likely with posterior positioning because sediment can be stirred up by the motion of the gastropod. Another possible advantage for aquatic species is that moving the osphradium (olfactory sense organs) to an anterior position means they are sampling water the gastropod is entering rather than leaving. This may help the gastropod locate food or avoid predators. In terrestrial species, ventilation is better with anterior positioning. This is due to the back and forth motion of the shell during movement, which would tend to block the mantle opening against the foot if it was in a posterior position. The evolution of an asymmetrical conispiral shell allowed gastropods to grow larger, but resulted in an unbalanced shell. Torsion allows repositioning of the shell, bringing the centre of gravity back to the middle of the gastropod's body, and thus helps prevent the animal or the shell from falling over.

Whatever original advantage resulted in the initial evolutionary success of torsion, subsequent adaptations linked to torsion have provided modern gastropods with further advantages.

== Sources ==
- Brusca, R.C.; Brusca, G.J. (1990) Invertebrates. Sinauer Associates, Inc. Massachusetts.
- Page L. R. (2006) "Modern insights on gastropod development: Reevaluation of the evolution of a novel body plan". Integrative and Comparative Biology 46(2): 134–143. doi:10.1093/icb/icj018.
- Ruppert, E.E. et al. (2004) Invertebrate Zoology. Seventh edition. Brooks/Cole – Thompson Learning. Belmont, California.
