= Daphnella levicallis =

Scientific classification
- Kingdom: Animalia
- Phylum: Mollusca
- Class: Gastropoda
- Subclass: Caenogastropoda
- Order: Neogastropoda
- Superfamily: Conoidea
- Family: Raphitomidae
- Genus: Daphnella
- Species: D. levicallis

Binomial name
- Daphnella levicallis Poorman, L., 1983

Species of gastropod

Daphnella levicallis is a species of sea snail, a marine gastropod mollusk in the family Raphitomidae.

== Description ==
Daphnella levicallis is a member of the order Neogastropoda. Neogastropoda are mostly gonochoric and broadcast spawners. The embryos grow into planktonic trochophore larvae, then later into juvenile veligers.

== Distribution ==
This species occurs in the Sea of Cortez, Western Mexico.
