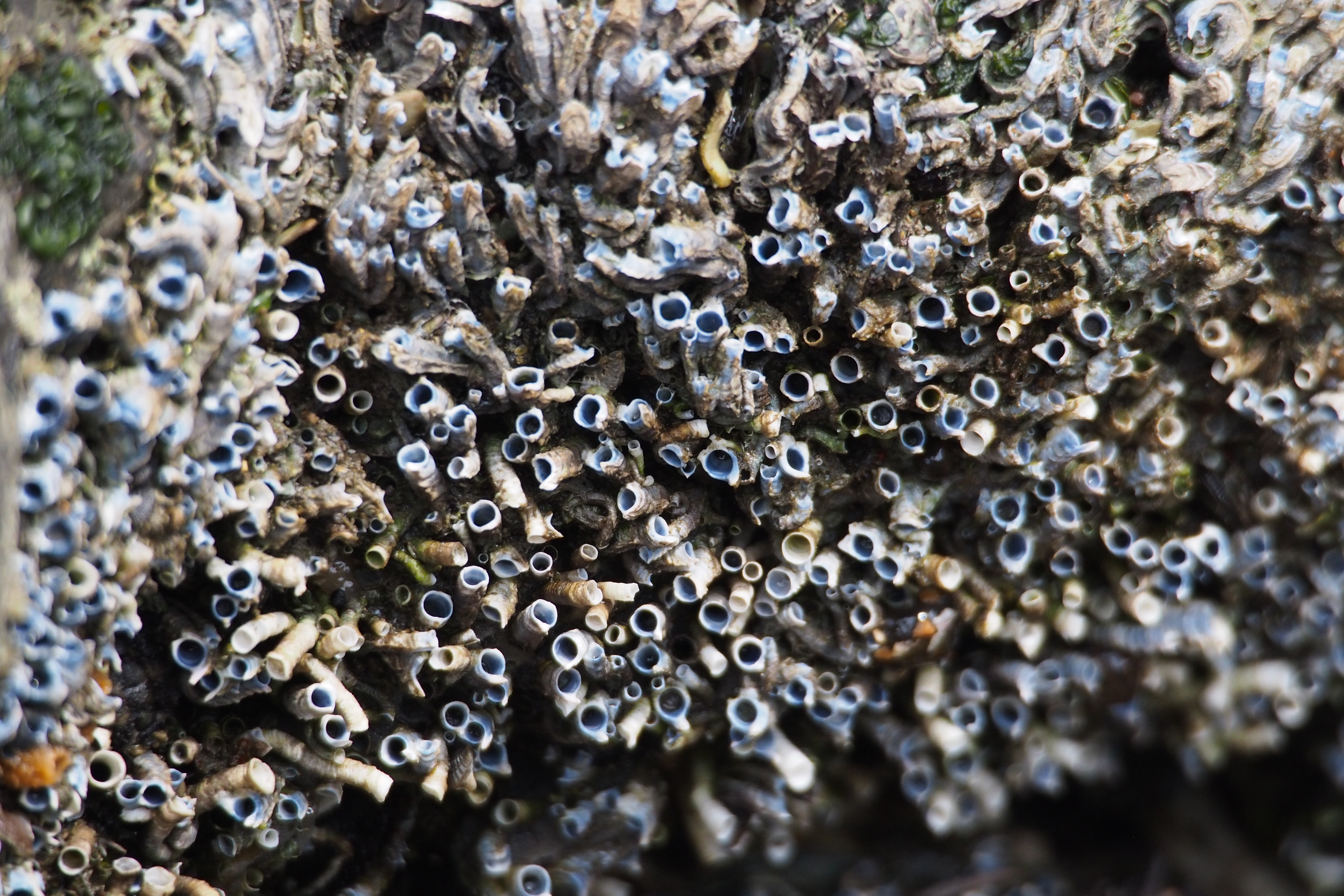

Scientific classification
- Kingdom: Animalia
- Phylum: Annelida
- Clade: Pleistoannelida
- Clade: Sedentaria
- Order: Sabellida
- Family: Serpulidae
- Genus: Spirobranchus
- Species: S. kraussii

Binomial name
- Spirobranchus kraussii (Baird, 1865)

= Spirobranchus kraussii =

Species of marine annelid from the Indian ocean

Spirobranchus kraussii, the blue coral-worm, is a species of marine invertebrate in the family Serpulidae of order Sabellida. It is native to the Indian Ocean.

== Synonyms ==
- Placostegus caeruleus Schmarda, 1861 (confused, subjective synonym of two other taxa)
- Placostegus cariniferus kraussii Baird, 1865 (superseded original combination)
- Placostegus latiligulatus Baird, 1865
- Placostegus ornatus articulata Mörch, 1863 (subjective synonym)
- Pomatoceros (Pomatoleios) caerulescens Augener, 1922 (subjective synonym)
- Pomatoleios caerulescens Augener, 1922 (subjective synonym)
- Pomatoleios crosslandi Pixell, 1913 (subjective synonym)
- Pomatoleios kraussii (Baird, 1865) (superseded recombination)
- Pomatoleios kraussii manilensis Pillai, 1965 (subjective synonym)

== Distribution ==
- Indo-West Pacific
- Cape Peninsula to Mozambique
- South Africa
- Mediterranean Sea (alien)
- Gulf of Mexico (from synonym)
- Madagascar (from synonym)
- North Atlantic Ocean European waters [from synonym]
- Red Sea
- Persian Gulf
- Australia
- Japan
- India
- Hawaii

== Description ==
The head has two rows of feathery branches and a stalked operculum with two pointed wings and a flat cap. Length about 15mm and tubes are about 2mm inside diameter.

== Habitat ==
The blue coral-worm builds massive colonies of interwoven calcareous tubes, which can be locally abundant on moderately exposed rocky shores. It is a filter feeder.
