= Euthyneury =

An illustration of the evolutionary process of streptoneury among gastropods which is subsequently reversed during euthyneury. A. bilateral/ euthyneury, B. asymmetrical, C. streptoneurous condition. The reference letters are placed upon the organs of the primitive left side. a. anus; c. cerebral ganglion; g. ctenidium; l. auricle; m. mouth; n. nephridial opening; o. osphradium; pa. parietal ganglion; pe. pedal ganglion; pl. pleural ganglion; v. ventricle.

Euthyneury is a plesiomorphic condition present in some gastropods which is a result of two evolutionary events. The first event, which was experienced by the ancestors of all extant gastropods, is known as torsion. Torsion describes the event in which the intestines, heart, nephridia, gills, and nerve cords "twisted" causing some organs to migrate from the animal's left to its right in order to accommodate the relocation of the mantle cavity close to the animal's head. Torsion created a condition in the cerebrovisceral commissures called streptoneury. Secondarily, some gastropod lineages detorted: they reversed the torsion event and straightened out their internal organs, uncrossing the commissures in the process. It is this second state, one in which the commissures have once again become untwisted, that is called euthyneury.

The Opisthobranchia represent one of the more prominent gastropod lineages that have undergone euthyneury.
