= Platynereis =

- Platynereis dumerilii

Scientific classification
- Kingdom: Animalia
- Phylum: Annelida
- Clade: Pleistoannelida
- Subclass: Errantia
- Order: Phyllodocida
- Family: Nereididae
- Subfamily: Nereidinae
- Genus: Platynereis; Kinberg, 1865

Genus of annelids

Platynereis is a genus of marine annelid worms that belongs to the Nereididae, a family of errant polychaete worms.

The species Platynereis dumerilii is used in development biology to study development (embryogenesis), in particular because their embryos are largely transparent, and thus easy to follow. Apical organs such as this one are photosensitive which is a key component in their formation. They also have a common ancestor with cnidarians and bilaterians.

== Species ==
- Platynereis abnormis
- Platynereis antipoda
- Platynereis arafurensis
- Platynereis australis
- Platynereis bengalensis
- Platynereis bicanaliculata
- Platynereis calodonta
- Platynereis cebuensis
- Platynereis coccinea
- Platynereis cristatus
- Platynereis dumerilii
- Platynereis festiva
- Platynereis fuscorubida
- Platynereis hugonis
- Platynereis hutchingsae
- Platynereis insolita
- Platynereis karaka
- Platynereis kau
- Platynereis magalhaensis
- Platynereis mahanga
- Platynereis massiliensis
- Platynereis megalops
- Platynereis mucronata
- Platynereis nadiae
- Platynereis pallida
- Platynereis patagonica
- Platynereis polyscalma
- Platynereis pulchella
- Platynereis sinica
- Platynereis tongatabuensis
- Platynereis uniseris
