= Streptoneury =

Gastropod biological evolution

An illustration of the evolutionary process of streptoneury among gastropods. A. bilateral, B. asymmetrical, C. streptoneurous condition. The reference letters are placed upon the organs of the primitive left side. a. anus; c. cerebral ganglion; g. ctenidium; l. auricle; m. mouth; n. nephridial opening; o. osphradium; pa. parietal ganglion; pe. pedal ganglion; pl. pleural ganglion; v. ventricle.

Streptoneury or chiastoneury is a plesiomorphic condition present in all gastropods which is a result of an evolutionary event called torsion in which the intestines, heart, nephridia, gills, and nerve cords "twist" causing some organs to migrate from the animal's left to its right in order to accommodate the relocation of the mantle cavity close to the animal's head. Specifically, streptoneury is the crossing of the cerebrovisceral connectives caused by this torsion.

In a streptoneurous animal, the right visceral nerve becomes a supraintestinal nerve (i.e., moving up from its former position along the intestines on the right side) and the left visceral nerve becomes a subintestinal nerve (i.e., moving down below the intestines and shifting to the right).

The extant gastropod molluscs can be described as streptoneurous. However, some lineages, especially the opisthobranchs, have reversed this twist secondarily. The term for this event is detorsion, and the condition in a detorted animal— a state in which these nerves no longer cross— is called euthyneury.
