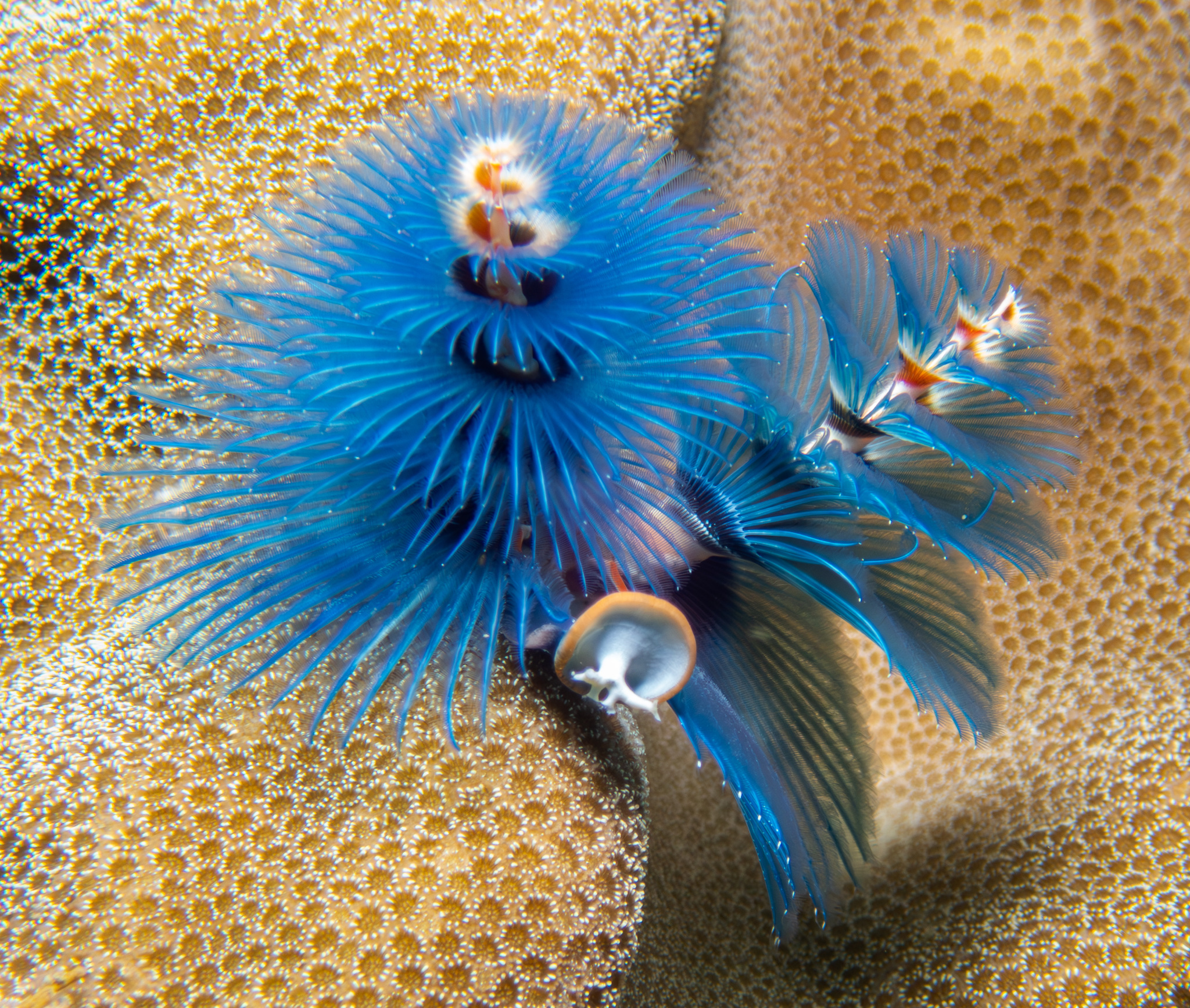
- Surat Thani, Thailand, 2023

Scientific classification
- Kingdom: Animalia
- Phylum: Annelida
- Clade: Pleistoannelida
- Clade: Sedentaria
- Order: Sabellida
- Family: Serpulidae
- Genus: Spirobranchus
- Species: S. corniculatus

Binomial name
- Spirobranchus corniculatus (Grube, 1862)

= Spirobranchus corniculatus =

Species of fanworm

Spirobranchus corniculatus, commonly referred to as the Indo-Pacific Christmas tree worm, is a species of tube-building annelid fanworms in the family Serpulidae. Belonging to the class Polychaeta, it is recognized for its bristle-like tentacles and the presence of a structure called radioles. It is widely encountered and recognized for its unique resemblance to a conifer and its diverse array of colors. Initially presumed to be part of a species group including Spirobranchus cruciger and Spirobranchus gaymardi, it has been determined to be a singular, morphologically adaptable species inhabiting the Central Indo-Pacific region.

== Description ==
The Christmas tree worm is very vibrant in color and changes its color based on depth, camouflage, and a scare tactic. It has bright spiral rings around its body segments or radioles, which can number more than 200 segments. The body is abnormally large, ranging up to 45 mm (1.8 in) long and 0.5 mm (0.020 in) wide.

== Biology ==
The species predominantly engages in reproduction throughout its lifespan. Males use their coloration to attract females. During mating, females emit a pheromone that signals males to release sperm. In turn, females release eggs; this action is called spawning. Larvae are characterized by an elongated body. The species also uses its color to make predators second guess their meal. The species primarily consumes suspended food particles, phytoplankton, and microalgae.

== Distribution and habitat ==
Spirobranchus corniculatus can be found in the tropical Indo-Pacific, specifically in corals such as Porites lobata, which are typically found in Hawaiian waters. The Christmas tree worm inhabits depths of 3–30 m (9.8–98.4 ft) and can also be found living on almost every species of coral. It is mostly encountered in the eastern side of the globe, spanning Southeast Asia, the Indian Ocean, the central Pacific, and the northern region of Australia.

== Gallery ==
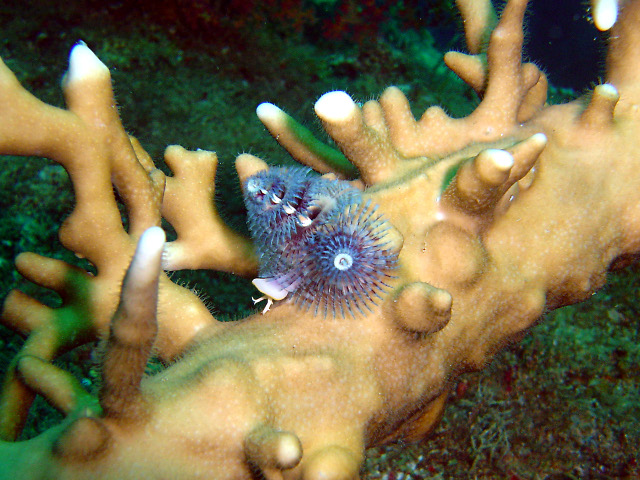

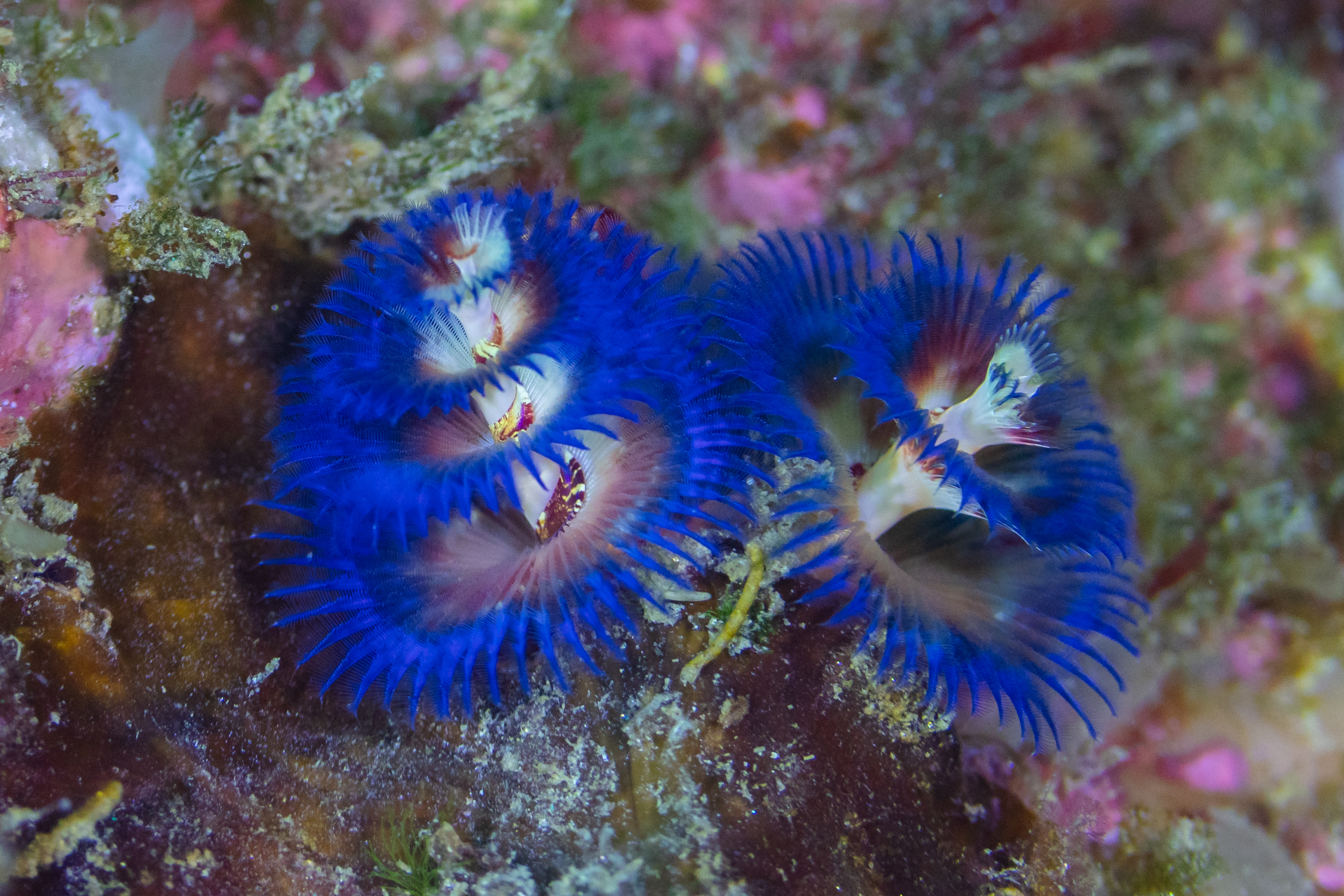

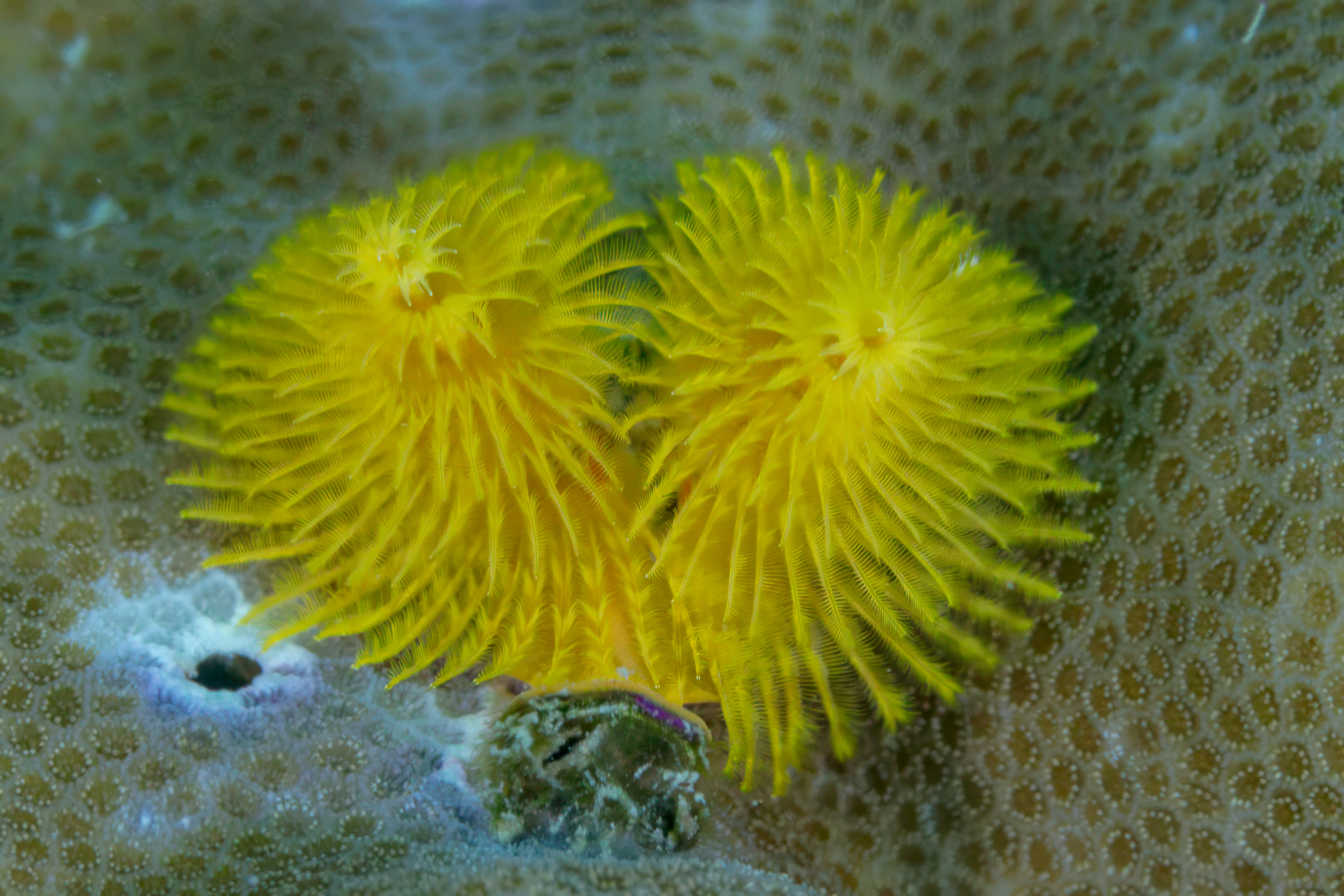
