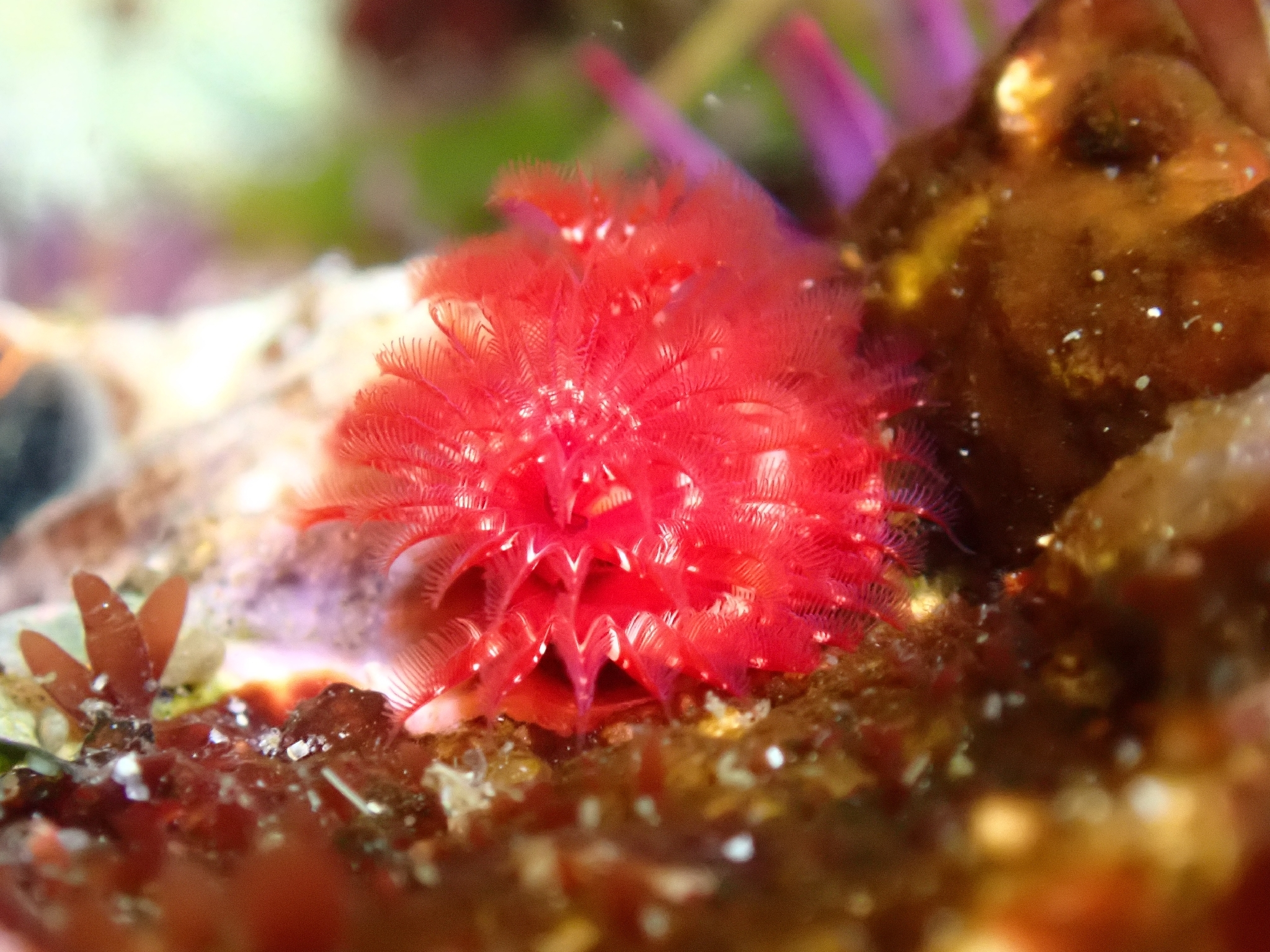
- Pacific Grove, California, 2026

Scientific classification
- Kingdom: Animalia
- Phylum: Annelida
- Clade: Pleistoannelida
- Clade: Sedentaria
- Order: Sabellida
- Family: Serpulidae
- Genus: Spirobranchus
- Species: S. spinosus

Binomial name
- Spirobranchus spinosus Moore, 1923

Synonyms
- Spirabranchus spinosus Moore, 1923; Spirobranchus quadricornis non (Grube) sensu Treadwell, 1914

= Spirobranchus spinosus =

Species of fanworm

Spirobranchus spinosus, commonly referred to as the California Christmas tree worm, is a species of tube-building annelid fanworms in the family Serpulidae.

== Description ==
The most visible feature of Spirobranchus spinosus is its pair of spiral radiole bundles, or gills, which each coil in three tiers and form a conical shape that resembles a Christmas tree, inspiring the common name. The gill plumes extend around 2.5 cm, and are composed of around 45 densely packed segments, which appear in a wide variety of vibrant colors, including blue, red, pink, orange, and yellow. The worm's body is encased in a white or cream-colored calcareous tube, into which it can retract the gills behind its operculum. The operculum is pink, circular and similarly calcareous.

== Natural history ==
Like all serpulid polychaetes, the California Christmas tree worm is a sessile suspension feeder that filters plankton and other organic matter from the water using its radioles. The radioles are also used for respiration. Reproduction occurs through broadcast spawning, where eggs and sperm are released into the water column for external fertilization. First, the female produces pheromones, which signal males to shed their sperm in a process called swarming. After fertilization, the eggs develop into planktonic larvae, which eventually settle onto rock substrates in the intertidal or subtidal up to a depth of 12 meters.

== Etymology ==
The genus name Spirobranchus means spiral gill. The specific epithet spinosus means spiny.
