= Platynereis festiva =

Scientific classification
- Kingdom: Animalia
- Phylum: Annelida
- Clade: Pleistoannelida
- Subclass: Errantia
- Order: Phyllodocida
- Family: Nereididae
- Genus: Platynereis
- Species: P. festiva

Binomial name
- Platynereis festiva (Grube, 1874)

Synonyms
- Nereis festiva Grube, 1874

Species of annelid worm

Platynereis festiva is a species of annelid in the family Nereididae. It was originally described in the genus Nereis and later reassigned to the genus Platynereis.
