= Metatrochophore =

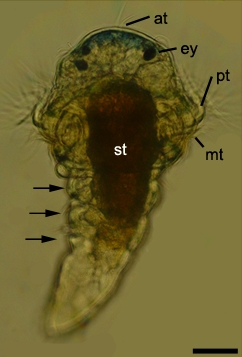
Bright-field microscope image of metatrochophore of annelid Pomatoceros lamarckii (family Serpulidae) ey = eyspot

A metatrochophore (/ˌmiːtəˈtroʊkəˌfɔːr, ˌmɛ-, -ˈtrɒ-, -koʊ-/;) is a type of larva developed from the trochophore larva of a polychaete annelid.

The metatrochophore of a deep-sea hydrothermal vent vestimentiferan has a foregut and a midgut. The foregut cells have several microvilli, basal bodies, and cilia, with e-dense granules dispersed in the apical cell region. The diameter of the midgut in one specimen was 50 μm and the lumen’s diameter was 7 μm, in which the cilia extended and e-dense material was found. The midgut cells had fewer cilia than the fore- and hindgut cells but exhibited an extensive, e-dense brush of microvilli and a nucleus in the apical third of the cell body. Additionally, the midgut contained a few bacteria in the lumen.

Metatrochophores have a number of features trochophores lack, including eyespots and segments.
