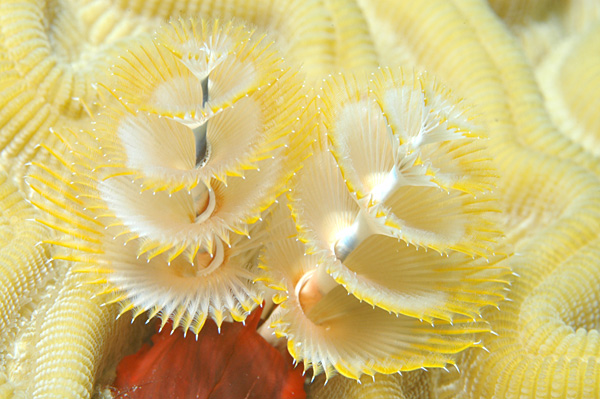
- Spirobranchus giganteus, a popular species in the genus.

Scientific classification
- Kingdom: Animalia
- Phylum: Annelida
- Clade: Pleistoannelida
- Clade: Sedentaria
- Order: Sabellida
- Family: Serpulidae
- Subfamily: Serpulinae
- Genus: Spirobranchus; Blainville, 1818

Species
- See text

Synonyms
- Pomatoceros Philippi, 1844

= Spirobranchus =

Genus of marine polychaete annelids, known as Christmas-tree worms

Spirobranchus is the second largest genus of tube-building annelid fanworms in the family Serpulidae. Members of Spirobranchus are known as Christmas tree worms.

The worms form a calcareous tube which becomes incorporated into their host coral. The prominent features visible externally are a pair of conical spiral radiole bundles ("trees"), and an operculum that closes when they retract into their tube.

The crown of radioles serves for both food-gathering and respiration. "Christmas tree" refers to the tiered, tapered shape, whilst "Spirobranchus" translates to "spiral gill".

== Taxonomy and systematics ==
The type species Spirobranchus giganteus was described by Peter Simon Pallas in 1766 as Serpula gigantea. In 1818, Henri de Blainville separated "S. gigantea de Linné" into a its own genus named in French as "Spirobranche".

== Species ==
The species in the genus (World Register of Marine Species) include:

- Spirobranchus aloni Perry, Bronstein, Simon-Blecher, Atkins, Kupriyanova, ten Hove, Levy & Fine, 2018
- Spirobranchus corniculatus (Grube, 1862)
- Spirobranchus latiscapus Marenzeller, 1885
- Spirobranchus americanus (Day, 1973)
- Spirobranchus arabicus Monro, 1937
- Spirobranchus baileybrockae Pillai. 2009
- Spirobranchus cariniferus (Gray, 1843)
- Spirobranchus coronatus Straughan, 1967
- Spirobranchus corrugatus Straughan, 1967
- Spirobranchus decoratus Imajima, 1982
- Spirobranchus dendropoma Mörch, 1863
- Spirobranchus eitzeni Augener, 1918
- Spirobranchus gardineri Pixell, 1913
- Spirobranchus giganteus (Pallas, 1766)
- Spirobranchus incrassatus Krøyer in Mörch, 1863
- Spirobranchus kraussii (Baird, 1865)
- Spirobranchus lamarcki (Quatrefages, 1866)
- Spirobranchus latiscapus (Marenzeller, 1885)
- Spirobranchus lima (Grube, 1862)
- Spirobranchus maldivensis Pixell, 1913
- Spirobranchus minutus (Rioja, 1941)
- Spirobranchus murrayi Pillai, 2009
- Spirobranchus nigranucha (Fischli, 1903)
- Spirobranchus paumotanus (Chamberlin, 1919)
- Spirobranchus polycerus (Schmarda, 1861)
- Spirobranchus polytrema (Philippi, 1844)
- Spirobranchus pseudopolytremus Pillai, 2009
- Spirobranchus richardsmithi Pillai, 2009
- Spirobranchus spinosus Moore, 1923
- Spirobranchus taeniatus (Lamarck, 1818)
- Spirobranchus tenhovei Pillai, 2009
- Spirobranchus tetraceros (Schmarda, 1861)
- Spirobranchus triqueter (Linnaeus, 1758)
- Spirobranchus zelandicus Pillai, 2009
- Spirobranchus zibrowii Pillai, 2009

== Bibliography ==
- Ruppert, Edward E.; Richard S. Fox; Robert D. Barnes (2004). Invertebrate Zoology: A Functional Evolutionary Approach (7th ed.). Belmont, CA: Brooks/Cole - Thomson Learning Inc. pp. 963. ISBN 0-03-025982-7.
