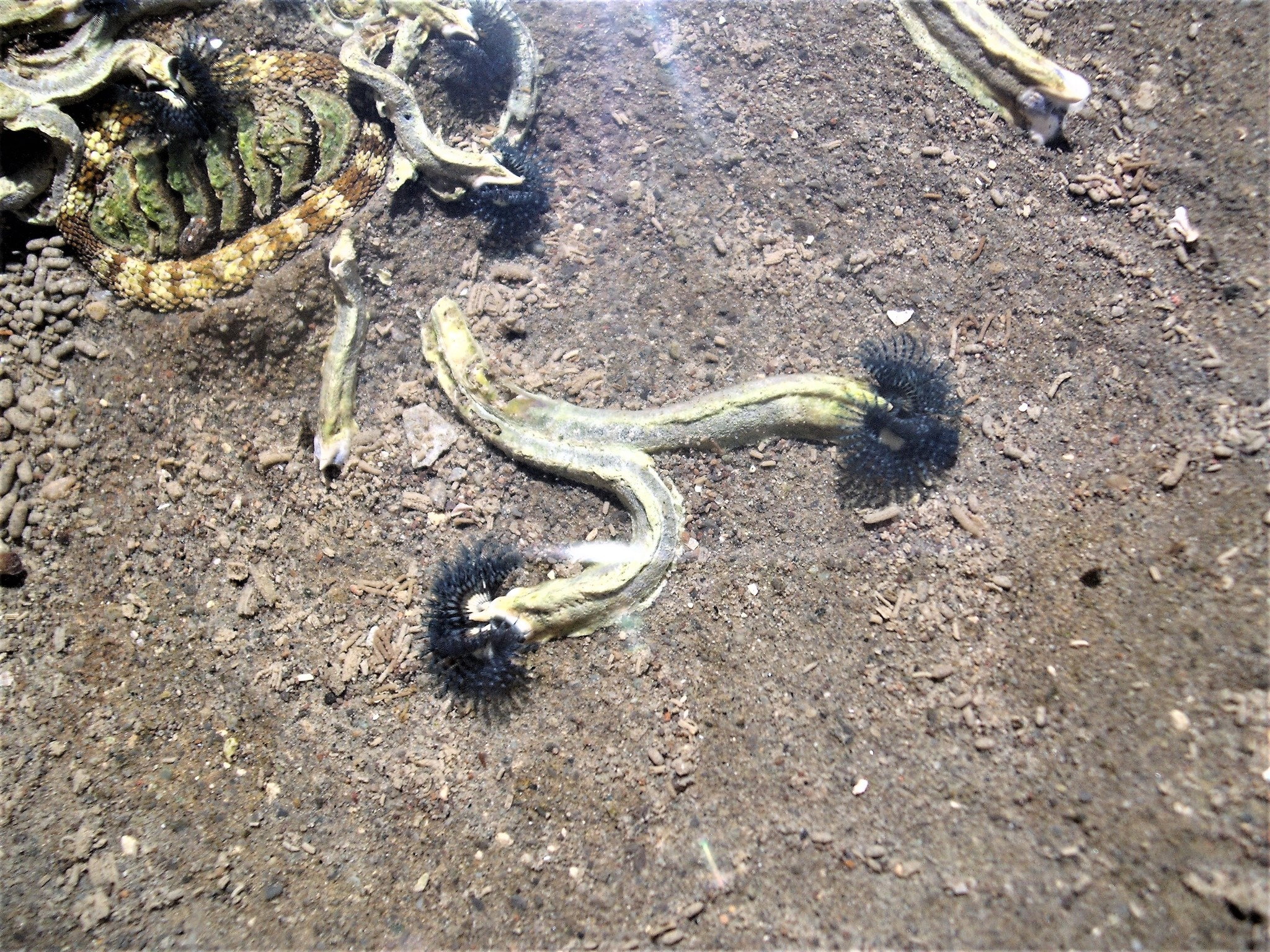

Scientific classification
- Kingdom: Animalia
- Phylum: Annelida
- Clade: Pleistoannelida
- Clade: Sedentaria
- Order: Sabellida
- Family: Serpulidae
- Genus: Spirobranchus
- Species: S. cariniferus

Binomial name
- Spirobranchus cariniferus Gray, 1843

= Spirobranchus cariniferus =

Blue tubeworm

Species of annelid worm

Spirobranchus cariniferus, commonly known as the blue tubeworm or spiny tubeworm, or by its Māori name toke pā, is a species of tube-building polychaete worm endemic to New Zealand.

This species forms patchy, belt-like colonies of hard, white, triangular tubes, each containing a bright blue worm. These are cemented to the shaded side of rocks in the lower to mid-tidal zone. It may also inhabit hard objects such as dead shells and small stones. When submerged, it puts out a fan of dark-blue tentacles to feed, which it retracts during low tide.

Individuals living in Dunedin's Otago Harbour are the only polychaetes known to host gregarine parasites. Little is known about their impact on the worms, but it is likely to be a negative one.

== Description ==
Adult worms can grow to 40 mm long and 3 mm wide. The tube is hard, white, and triangular in cross-section with a ridge running along the top. This extends from above the tube opening to form a sharp protective spine. The operculum is a flat, calcareous plate. Its stalk is flat with prolonged wings. Its body is a yellow to orange colour towards the posterior and a bright blue at the anterior. Radioles are a bright to dark blue with some white bands.

== Diet ==
The blue tubeworm is a surface filter feeder. It feeds on plankton and organic particles, which it filters from the water using its fan of tentacles.

== Distribution ==
It is found throughout New Zealand. Its tube layers can be up to 30 cm thick in the cooler climate of the South Island.
