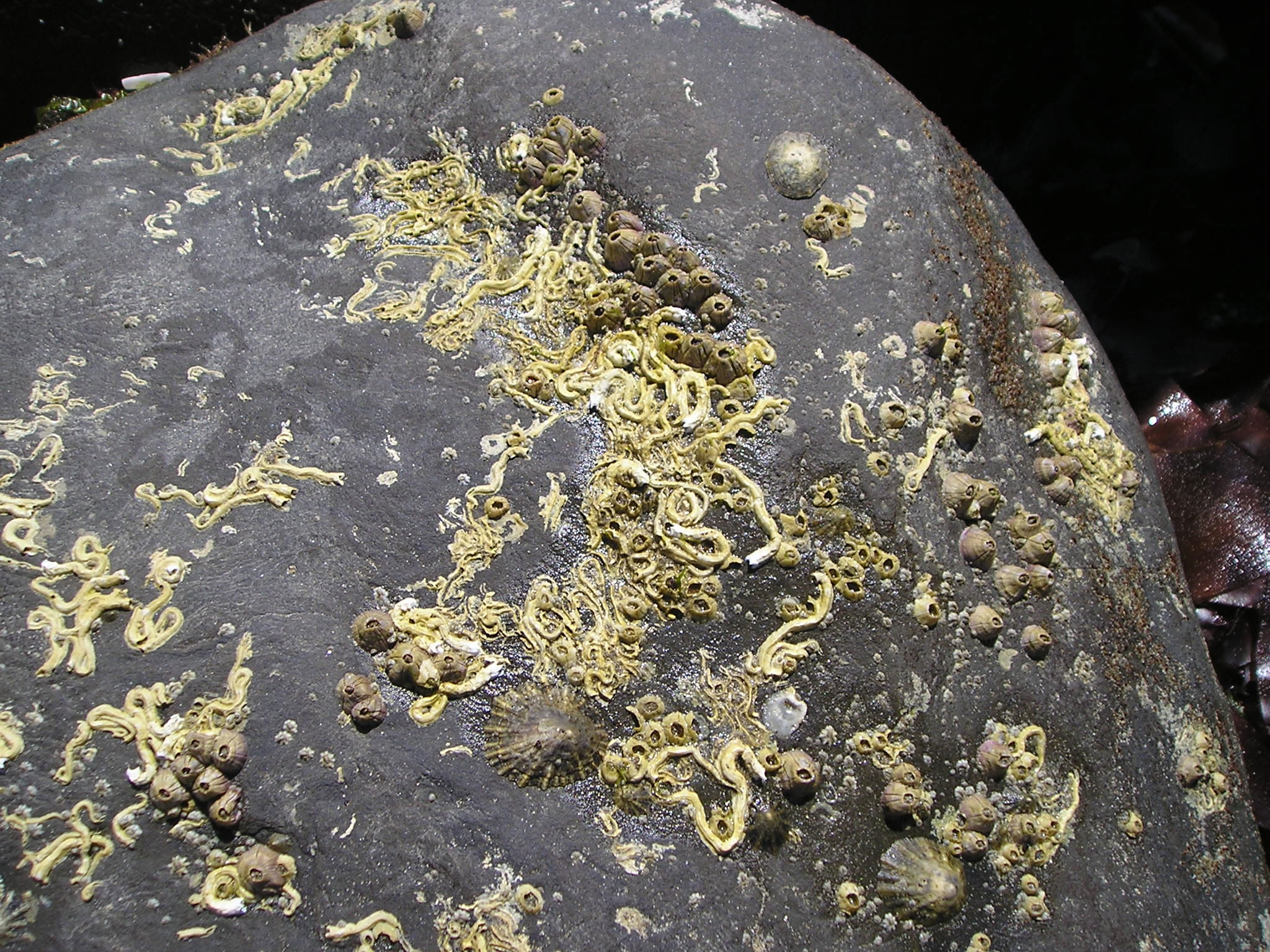
- Calcareous tubes on boulder

Scientific classification
- Kingdom: Animalia
- Phylum: Annelida
- Clade: Pleistoannelida
- Clade: Sedentaria
- Order: Sabellida
- Family: Serpulidae
- Genus: Spirobranchus
- Species: S. triqueter

Binomial name
- Spirobranchus triqueter (Linnaeus, 1758)

Synonyms
- Serpula triquetra Linnaeus, 1758; Pomatoceros triqueter (Linnaeus, 1758)

= Spirobranchus triqueter =

Species of annelid worm

Spirobranchus triqueter is a species of tube-building annelid worm in the class Polychaeta. It is common on the north eastern coasts of the Atlantic Ocean and in the Mediterranean Sea.

Polychaetes, or marine bristle worms, have elongated bodies divided into many segments. Each segment may bear setae (bristles) and parapodia (paddle-like appendages). Some species live freely, either swimming, crawling or burrowing, and these are known as "errant". Others live permanently in tubes, either calcareous or parchment-like, and these are known as "sedentary".

== Distribution ==
This species is found in the Arctic, eastern North Atlantic, the Mediterranean, Adriatic, Black and Red Sea, the English Channel, the North Sea, Skagerrak, Kattegat the Little and Great Belts and Øresund north east to the Bay of Kiel.

== Description ==
Spirobranchus triqueter secretes a white calcareous tube about three millimetres wide and up to twenty five millimetres long. It is smooth and usually curved with a single ridge in the middle that ends in a projection over the anterior opening. The operculum has a shallow, dish-shaped plug. The body of the worm is brightly coloured and the crown of radioles is banded with various colours. The body and crown can be withdrawn into the protective tube. It is closely related to, and often confused with, Spirobranchus lamarcki.

== Biology ==
Spirobranchus triqueter never leaves its tube. The action of cilia creates currents which circulate down the length of the tube. Respiration occurs when dissolved oxygen enters through the surface of the body and through the extended branchial crown. This tube worm is a filter feeder and cilia on the branchial filaments waft particles towards the central mouth. The particles are not sorted and any that are too large are removed from the mouth opening by the tip of a filament. There is a complete digestive system and like other polychaetes, S. triqueter excretes with the help of fully developed nephridia.

Spirobranchus triqueter males release spermatogonia or primary spermatocytes into the sea and females release primary oocytes. The larvae form part of the zooplankton for two to three weeks in the summer when the majority of the breeding takes place, but for up to two months in the winter. The larvae then settle on the substrate and build a temporary delicate, semi-transparent tube formed of mucus and calcareous matter. This is later hardened by a secretion of calcium carbonate from the collar and grows at the rate of 1.5 millimetres per month. Although it may superficially give the appearance of being formed in bands, this is caused by spurts in growth interspersed with quiescent periods.
