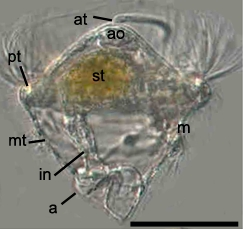
- Spirobranchus lamarcki trochophore

Scientific classification
- Domain: Eukaryota
- Kingdom: Animalia
- Phylum: Annelida
- Clade: Pleistoannelida
- Clade: Sedentaria
- Order: Sabellida
- Family: Serpulidae
- Genus: Spirobranchus
- Species: S. lamarcki

Binomial name
- Spirobranchus lamarcki (Quatrefages, 1866)

Synonyms
- Pomatoceros globiger Iroso, 1921; Pomatoceros lamarcki (Quatrefages, 1866); Pomatoceros lamarckii (Quatrefages, 1866); Vermilia lamarckii Quatrefages, 1866; Vermilia pusilla Quatrefages, 1866; Vermilia socialis Quatrefages, 1866

= Spirobranchus lamarcki =

Species of annelid

Spirobranchus lamarcki is a species of tube-building annelid worm which is widespread in intertidal and sub-littoral zones around the United Kingdom and northern Europe. They are found attached to firm substrates, from rocks to animal shells to man made structures, and often are noted for their detrimental effect on shipping. It is closely related to, and often confused with, Spirobranchus triqueter.

Spirobranchus lamarcki has been the subject of a number of scientific investigations, due to its presence near sites of historic scientific study, relatively underived mode of development and slowly evolving genetic complement. Recently this organism has been the subject of in depth transcriptomic investigation.

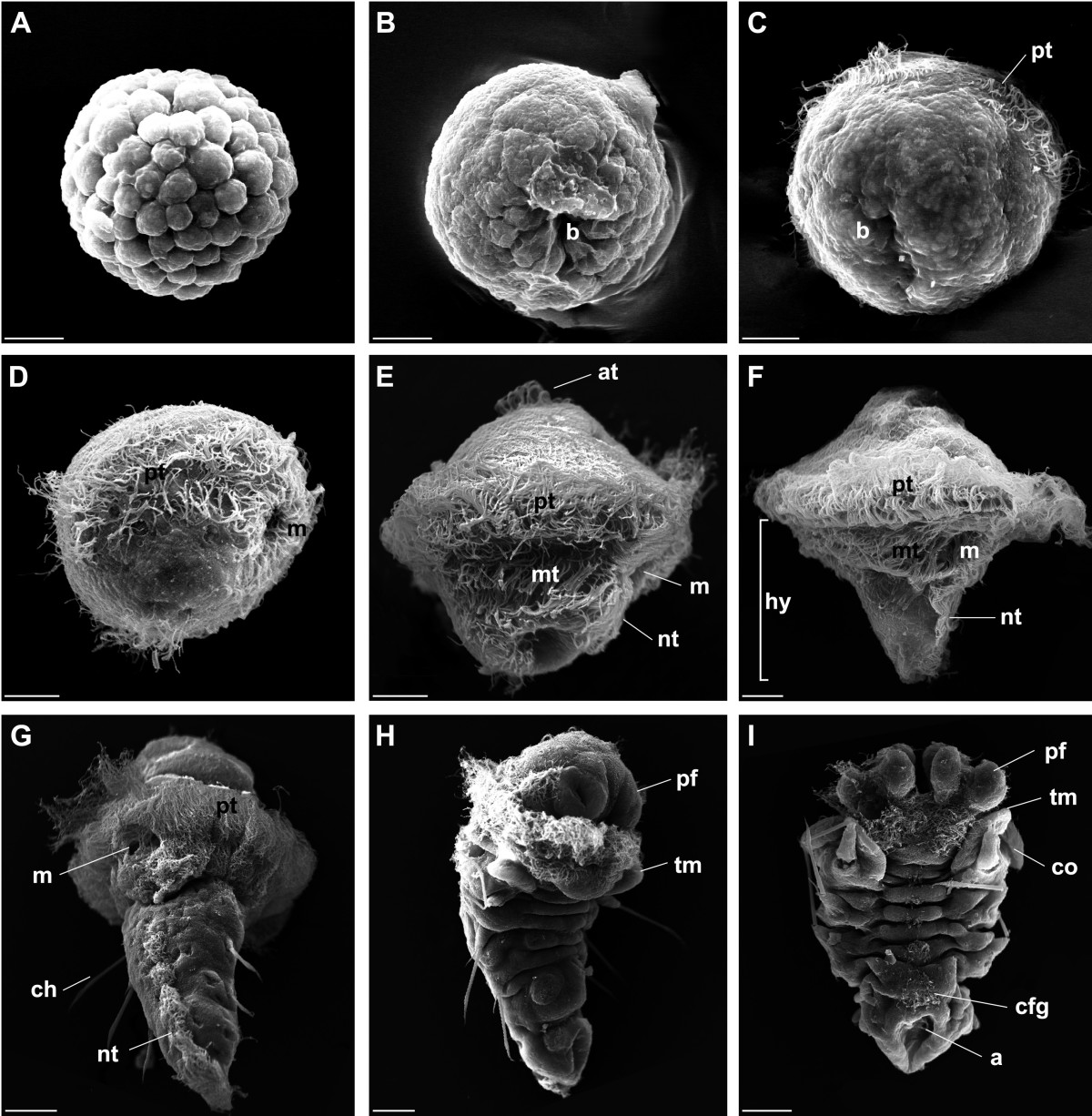
Spirobranchus lamarcki development
