= Epitoky =

Sexual maturation process in marine worms

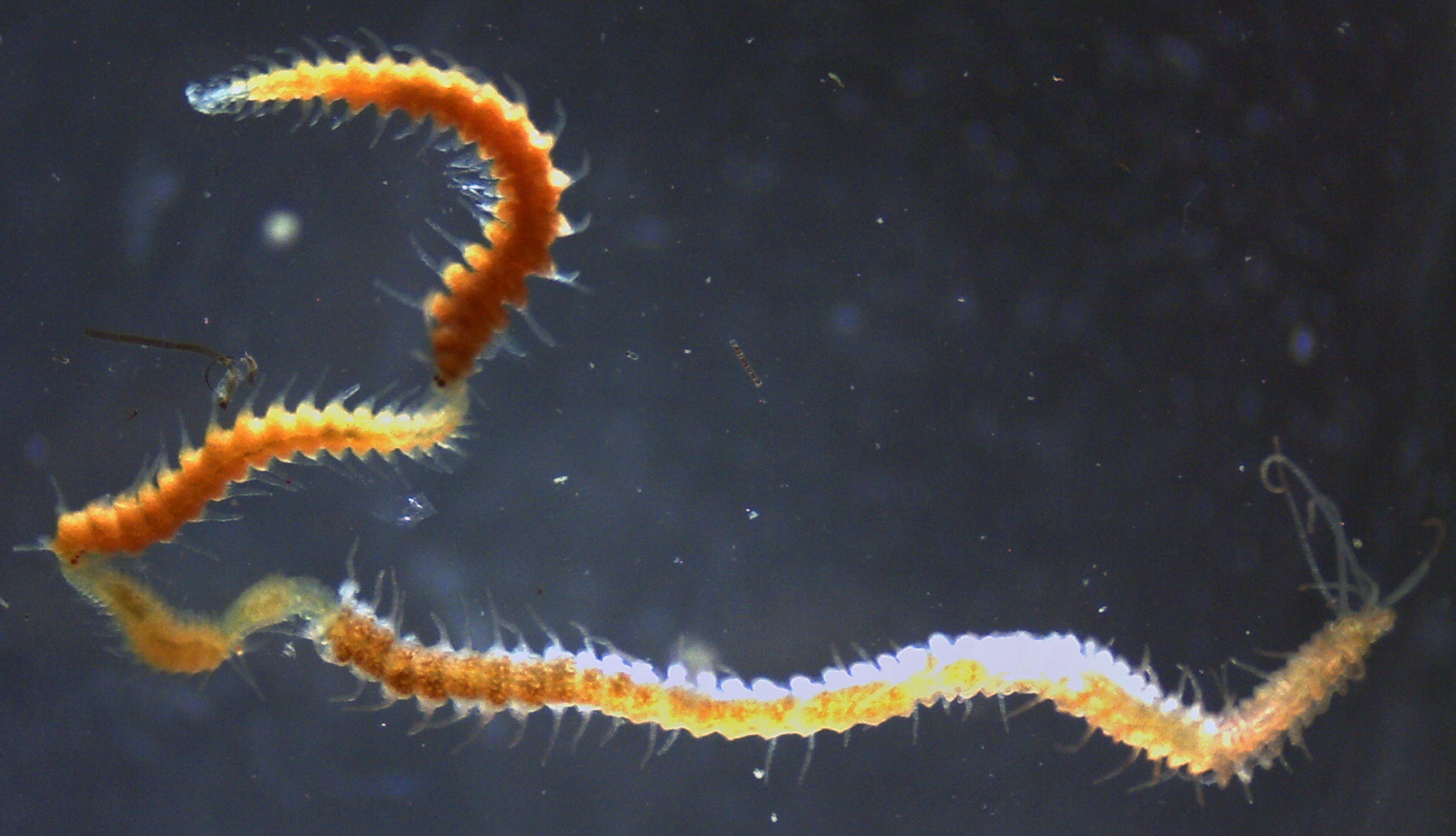
Syllid polychaete budding epitokes for the purpose of sexual reproduction.

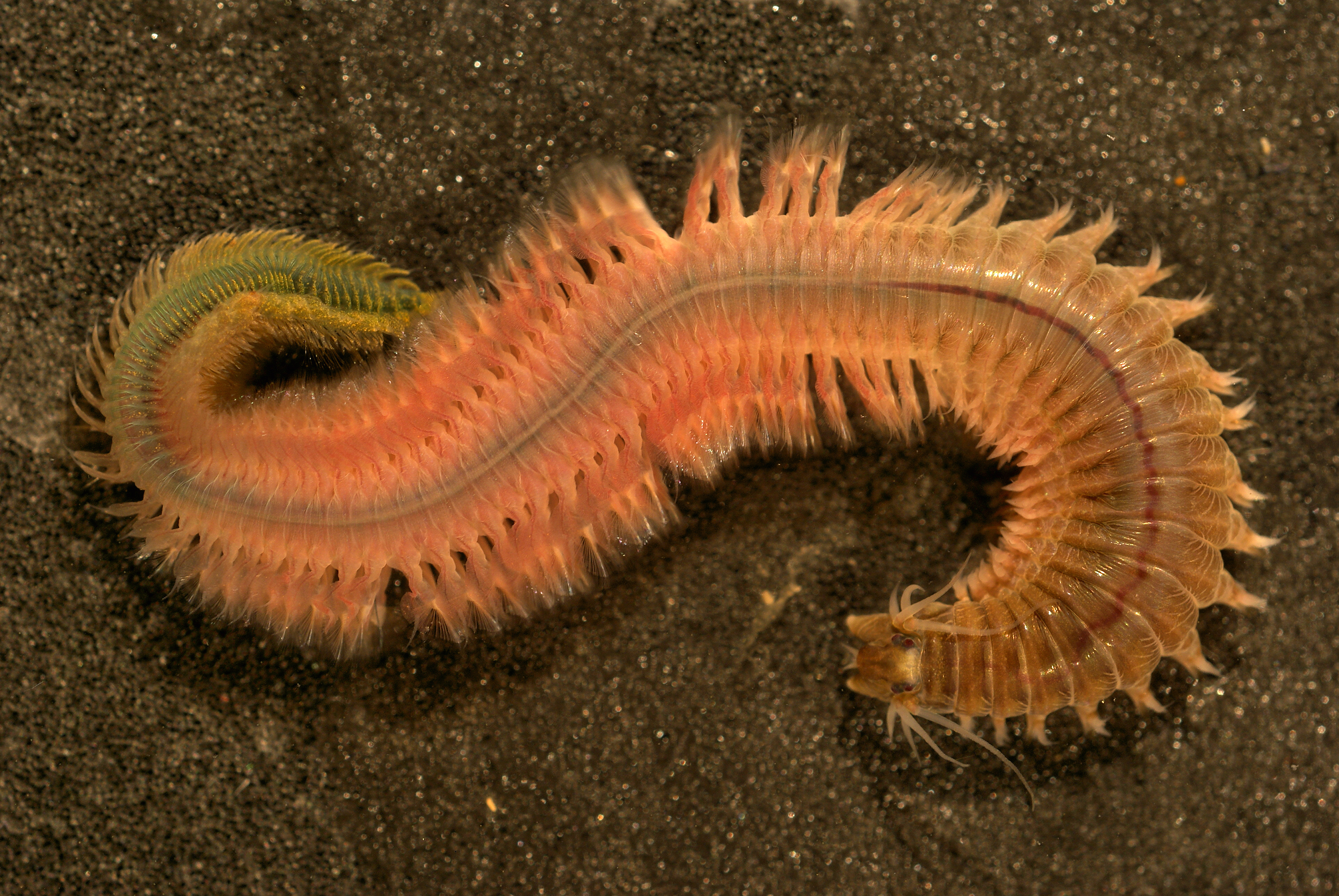
Alitta succinea, the common clam worm (Nereididae) in epitoky stage

Epitoky is a process that occurs in many species of polychaete marine worms wherein a sexually immature worm (the atoke) is modified or transformed into a sexually mature worm (the epitoke). In many species, the reproductive unit eventually detaches from the parent body as a distinct and independent individual called a stolon. Stolons are pelagic morphs capable of sexual reproduction. Unlike the immature form, which is typically benthic (lives on the bottom), epitokes are specialized for swimming as well as reproducing. The primary benefit to epitoky is increased chances of finding other members of the same species for reproduction.

There are two methods in which epitoky can occur: schizogamy and epigamy.

== Schizogamy ==
Many species go through schizogamy. There are two types of schizogamy: scissiparity and gemmiparity. In worms that use scissiparity, the posterior segments undergo modification before separating from the parent body as a single stolon. In species that reproduce by gemmiparity, several stolons may be produced at the same time, either as a long chain consisting of a series of connected stolons that separate when fully mature, or as separate stolons developing from the posterior end of the body. Atokes may then survive to produce additional stolons in subsequent reproductive cycles.

== Epigamy ==
Epigamy is another common way to form epitokes. For species that use this method, the atoke undergoes physiological and morphological modifications as it transforms into the epitoke. Typically, male worms undergo a more pronounced transformation from atoke to epitoke. Modifications may include an increase in size of parapodia and the development of paddle-like chaetae for enhanced swimming ability, atrophy of the gut, filling of the body cavity with gametes (eggs or sperm), the development of large eyes, and the musculature may even change to perform swimming movements instead of feeding movements. The majority of species that undergo epigamy are unable to revert to the atoke form and die after reproducing.

Male and female epitokes are produced and swim to the water's surface only at certain times of the year and are often synchronized with moon cycles in a behavior called swarming. Swarming brings individuals of the same species together so that there is an increased rate of fertilization. Some polychaete species have been found to use bioluminescence, presumably to compact and maintain swarms. Both schizogamous and epigamous epitokes are non-feeding individuals that die once gametes have been released into the water.

In the past, epitokes were thought to be a separate group of polychaete marine worms, because epitokes may look very different than atokes. For instance, the atokes of Platynereis dumerilii are yellowish-brown, while the female epitokes are yellow because of the eggs they contain, and the male epitokes are white in the front part due to sperm and red in the hind part due to blood vessels (see pictures).

Life stages of Platynereis dumerilii (Nereididae)

Atoke

Female epitoke; the yellow eggs are evident throughout the body

Male epitoke; front filled with white sperm, and rear is red with blood.
