= Trochophore =

Type of free-swimming marine larva

The anatomy of a trochophore A - episphere B - hyposphere 1 - ganglia 2 - apical tuft 3 - prototroch 4 - metatroch 5 - nephridium 6 - anus 7 - protonephridia 8 - gastrointestinal tract 9 - buccal opening 10 - blastocoele

A trochophore (/ˈtroʊkəˌfɔːr, ˈtrɒ-, -koʊ-/) is a type of free-swimming planktonic marine larva with several bands of cilia.

By moving their cilia rapidly, they make a water eddy to control their movement, and to bring their food closer in order to capture it more easily.

== Occurrence ==
Trochophores exist as a larval form within the trochozoan clade, which include the entoprocts, molluscs, annelids (including echiurans and sipunculans) and nemerteans. Together, these phyla make up part of the Lophotrochozoa; it is possible that trochophore larvae were present in the life cycle of the group's common ancestor.

== Etymology ==
The term trochophore derives from the ancient Greek τροχός (trókhos), meaning "wheel", and φέρω (phérō) — or φορέω (phoréō) —, meaning 'to bear, to carry', because the larva is bearing a wheel-shaped band of cilia.

== Feeding habits ==
Trochophore larvae are often planktotrophic; that is, they feed on other plankton species.

== Life cycle ==
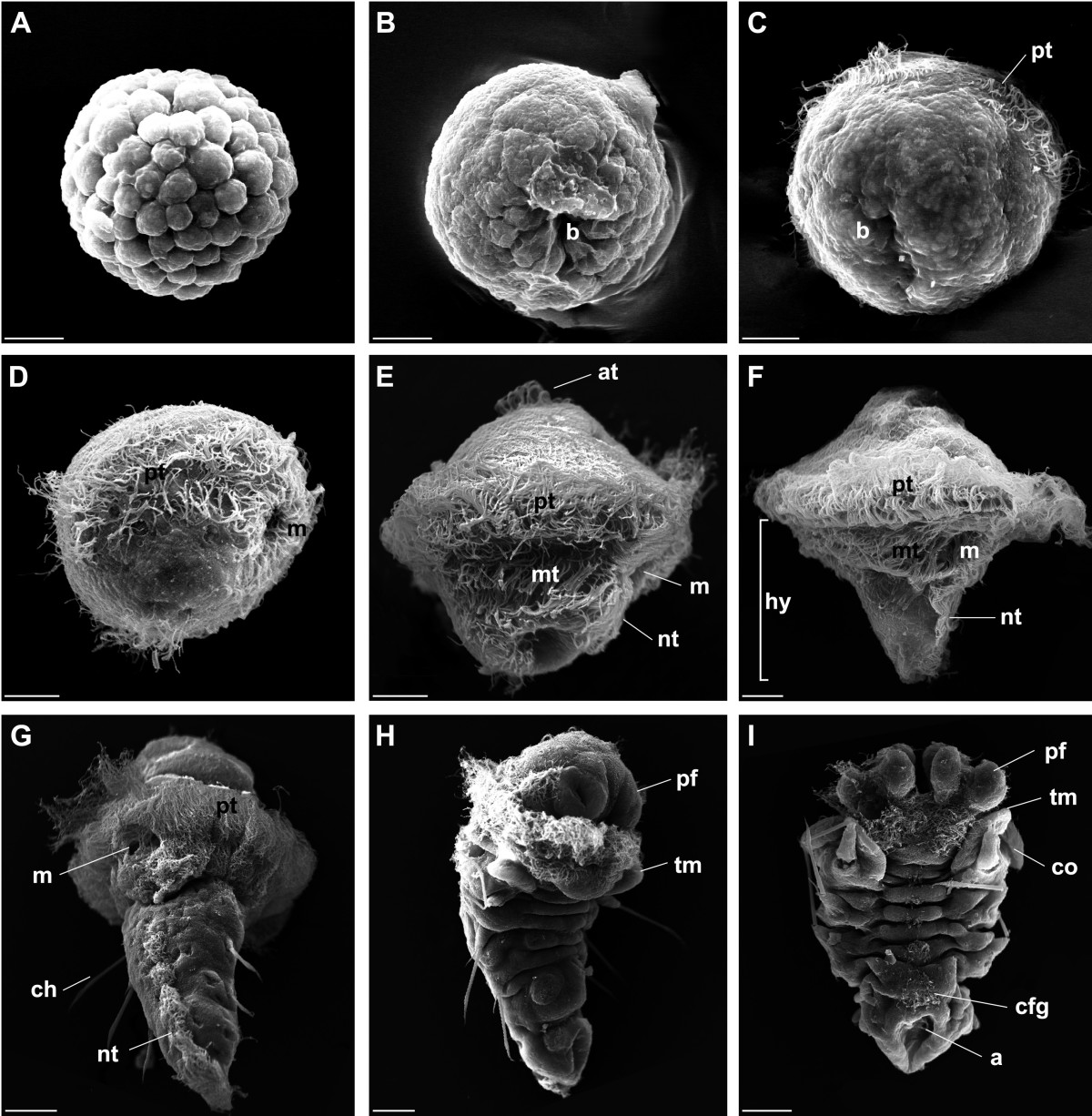
Bright-field microscope image of trochophore of annelid Pomatoceros lamarckii (family Serpulidae)

The example of the development of the annelid Pomatoceros lamarckii (family Serpulidae) shows various trochophore stages (image: D-F):
D - early trochophore;
E - complete trochophore;
F - late trochophore;
G - metatrochophore.

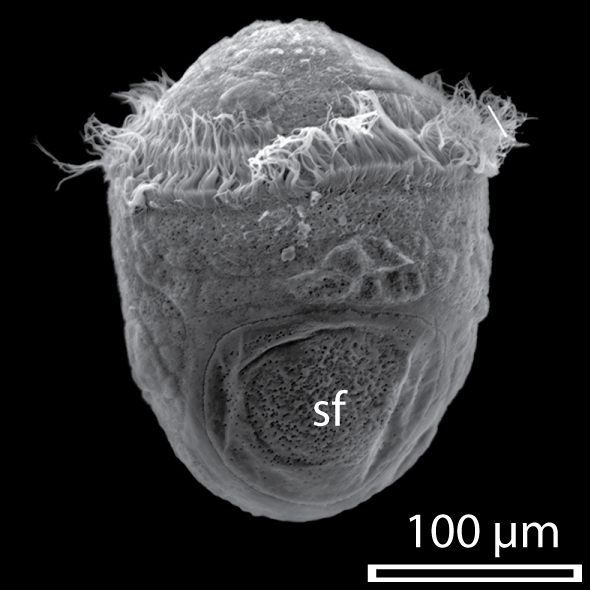
9-hour-old trochophore of the marine gastropod Haliotis asinina (sf - shell field)

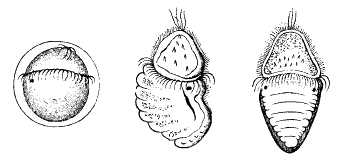
Ontogeny of the Polyplacophora: First image shows the trochophore, second shows the stadium in metamorphosis, third is a juvenile (scanning electron microscope: SEM)
