= Pneumopulmonata =

Scientific classification
- Kingdom: Animalia
- Phylum: Mollusca
- Class: Gastropoda
- Subterclass: Tectipleura
- Superorder: Pneumopulmonata; Krug et al., 2022

Clade of gastropods

Pneumopulmonata is a superorder of heterobranch pulmonate gastropods belonging to the subterclass Tectipleura. It was defined based on results of phylogenomic studies and named by Krug et al. (2022). The superorder unites all of Panpulmonata except for Sacoglossa.

== Description ==
Synapomorphy of the group is the presence of a pneumostome. It as established for the taxa comprising all descendants of the last common ancestor shared by Siphonarioidea, Amphiboloidea and Stylommatophora. It mainly contains clades occurring at the interface between sea and land, in freshwater, and in terrestrial habitats.

The following groups are included:

- Siphonarioidea
- Acochlidiacea
- Pylopulmonata
  - Amphiboloidea
  - Pyramidelloidea
  - Glacidorboidea
- Hygrophila
- Eupulmonata
  - Ellobiida
  - Systellommatophora
  - Stylommatophora

The clade largely overlaps with the former Pulmonata, but includes additional lineages as Pyramidelloidea. It is a sister group of Sacoglossa within Panpulmonata. Repeated colonizations of the freshwater and terrestrial realms occurred in this clade, and the biology and anatomy of its members is important for understanding the evolution of the highly diverse stylommatophoran land snails.

The individual subgroups differ in the digree of their terrestrialization as well as in the anatomical similarity to stylommatohora, sometimes reversing evolutionary trends seen in related groups:

- Siphonarioidea include a single family of marine limpet-like intertidal (but see the subtidal Williamia) gastropods. They have a large pallial cavity containing a secondary gill on a large part of its roof and opening by a non-contractible pneumostome on the right side of the body. During the high tide the cavity fills with water, at low tide it is used a lung. The pneumostome lacks a sphincter. Anus is located at the pneumostome. There is no operculum, tentacles are absent. Radula has many small and rather uniform teeth in each row. The genital system has a common spermoviduct ending in a copulatory organ and a single genital opening. Sperm is transferred in a spermatophore. Development is through a free-swimming veliger larva.
- Acochlidiacea is a group of shell-less gastropods of tiny size, mostly with distinctive dorsal visceral hump. They are mostly marine, inhabiting the interstitial of coastal sands, but there are also freshwater species. Pallial cavity is small or missing. Anus is located on the right side, may be moved to the visceral hump in some species. Operculum is missing. Two pairs of tentacles (rhinophores and labial tentacles) are present, but do not bear eyes. Radula is narrow, with as few as just one tooth per row, in some species asymmetric. Some are secondarily gonochoric, otherwise there is a common spemoviduct either ending with a single opening, connected to a copulatory organ/penial sheath by an external groove, or there is vas deferens and a separate male opening. At least some species use spermatophores for sperm transfer. Some species have veliger larvae.
- Amphiboloidea occur in on intertidal mud flats in marine or brackish water and are active during the low tide. The pallial cavity is used for breathing air when the snail is exposed, but also for breathing in water. There is no contractile pneumostome. Operculum is developed. The is one pair of tentacles, eyes are located near their base. Radula has many similar teeth per row. The structure of the genital system varies: there is a single genital opening, but there may be a common spermoviduct (Salinator) as well as separated oviduct and vas deferens (Maningrida). There is a free-swimming veliger larva.
- Pyramidelloidea is a group of marine snails, ectoparasitic on bivalves and annelids. They occur from the subtidal to depths of at least 300 m. They do not have a pneumostome and the pallial cavity contains a well developed gill. Operculum is present. Head bears a pair of tentacles, eyes are positioned medially on the head. Radula is lost and there is a long sucking proboscis. The genital system has a spermoviduct leading to a single common opening, but there is an external ciliated groove leading to vas deferes, penis, and a separate male genital opening. Development is through a free-swimming veliger larva.
- Glacidorboidea are tiny freshwater snails. The pallial cavity is widely open and filled with water; there is no gill. Anus and the genital opening are within the pallial cavity. Operculum is present. There is one pair of tentacles with eyes positioned medially on the head. Predatory, radula with large median teeth and much reduced lateral teeth. Direct development.
- Hygrophila is a clade of exclusively freshwater snails and limpets. They mostly breath oxygen from the air and regularly come to the surface to refill their pallial cavity with fresh air (this may not hold during the winter), but some live permanently submerged; secondary breathing surfaces for absorbing oxygen from water may be present. The basal Chilinidae (some species) and Latiidae breathe with their pallial cavity oxygen dissolved in the water. Pneumostome is contractible (but not in Chilinidae). Operculum is absent. There is one pair of tentacles that does not bear eyes. Radula has many small, similar teeth per row. In the genital system, the male and female tracts separate after a short spermoviduct (Chilinidae, Latiidae) or there is no common spermoviduct at all. Development is direct.
- Ellobiida mostly comprise snails, but also a single slug genus (Smeagol) and a limpet genus (Trimusculus). They are distributed from the marine upper littoral to moist terrestrial habitats. The conctractile pneustome is located on the right side of the body (quite posteriorly in Otina) and the pallial cavity functions as a lung. Operculum is absent, retained only in juveniles of Blauneria heteroclita. The is one pair of contractile or partially retractable tentacles (but see Trimusculus). Eyes are typically positioned medially of the tentacles, but in some Melampus they are on the tentacles at about 1/3 of their length. Radula typically has many similar teeth per row. The structure of the genital tract varies widely, from Pythia with a common spermoviduct leading to a single genital opening from which an external groove leads to the separate vas deferens and penis, to Leucopythia with female and male tracts separate from the carrefour and with two openings. There are free-swimming veliger larvae in marine species (e.g. Melampus).
- Systellommatophora include the mostly intertidal (subtidal to terrestrial) Onchidiidae as well as fully terrestrial Rathousiidae and Veronicellidae; all are shell-less slugs. Pallial cavity is used as a lung but may be gretaly reduced (Veronicellidae). Anus and the pneumostome (the latter except for Rathouisiidae) are shifted posteriorly and are located at the end of the body. Operculum is missing. There is one pair of retractable (Onchidiidae) or two pairs of contractile tentacles, eyes are located on tentacle tips. Radula has many similar teeth per row (but this is modified in Rathousiidae). There is a common spermoviduct, but then the male and female tracts divide and the male and female parts have widely separated openings. A free-swimming veliger larva is found in marine species of Ochidiidae, otherwise the development is direct.
- Stylommatophora is the most diverse group of land snails and slugs. Pallial cavity forms a spacious, air-filled lung. Anus is located on the right side close to the pneumostome. Operculum is missing. Two pairs of tentacle are retractable and the posterior pair bears eyes on the tips. Radula typically has many small, quite uniform teeth per row. The spermoviduct separates distally into an oviduct and vas deferens, but then there is a single genital opening for both male and female parts. Sperm transfer is via a spermatophore. Development is direct. A whole genome duplication occurred in the branch leading to Stylommatophora.
