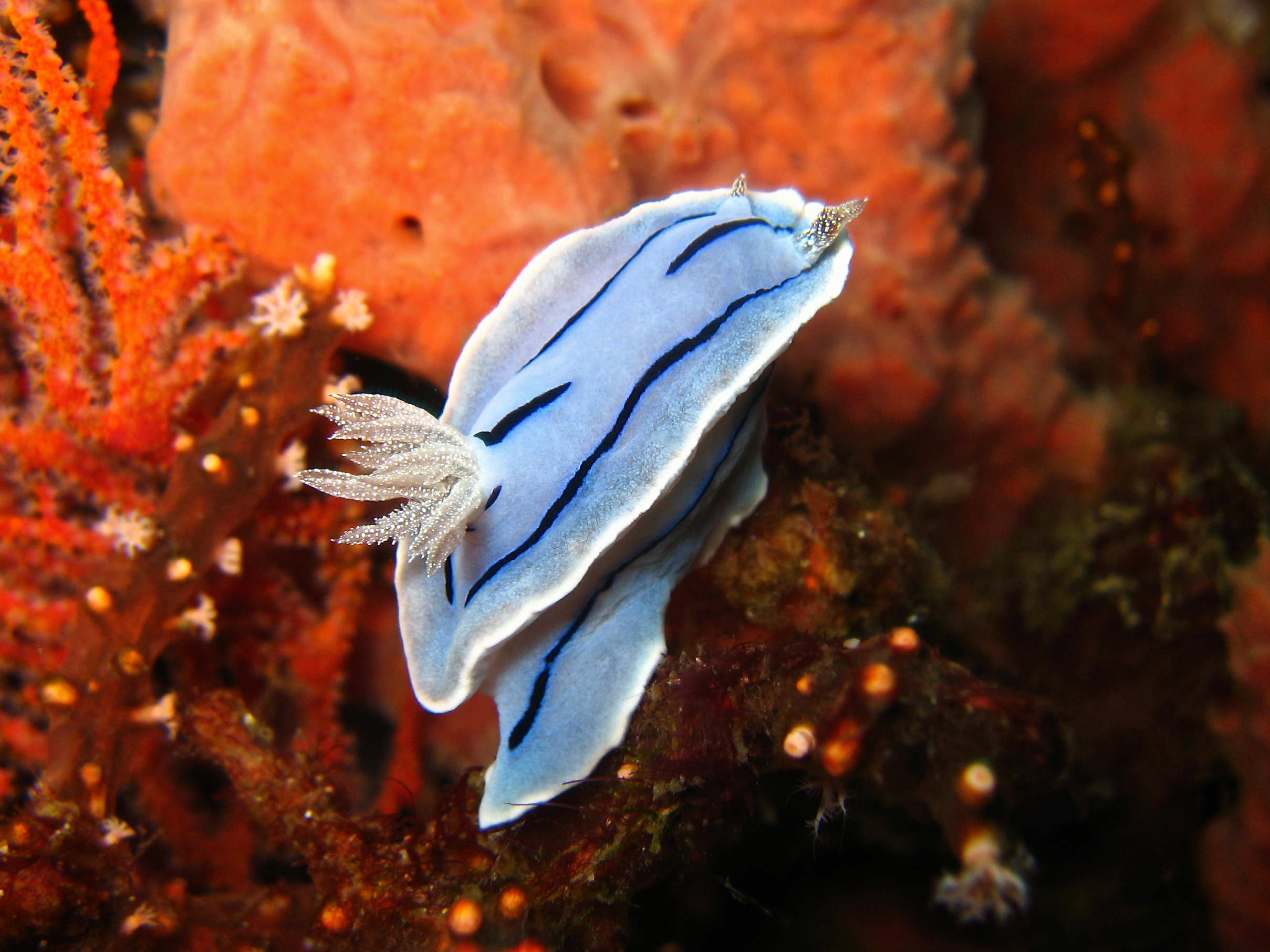
- Chromodoris willani, a nudibranch
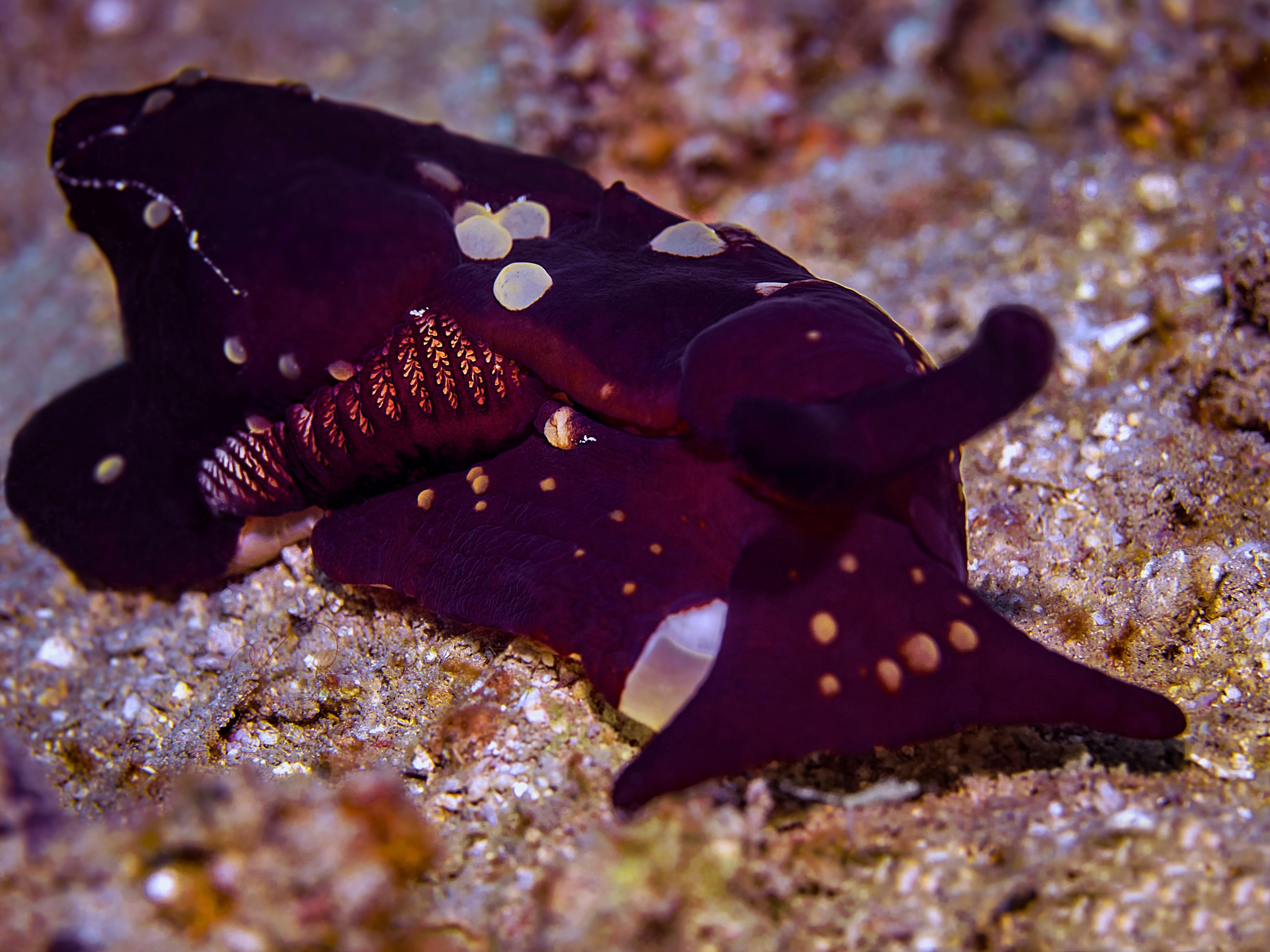
- Tomoberthella martensi, a pleurobranch

Scientific classification
- Kingdom: Animalia
- Phylum: Mollusca
- Class: Gastropoda
- Subterclass: Ringipleura
- Superorder: Nudipleura; Wägele & Willan, 2000

Clades
- clade Pleurobranchida; clade Nudibranchia

= Nudipleura =

Clade of gastropods

Nudipleura are a superorder of sea snails and sea slugs, marine gastropod mollusks within the larger clade Heterobranchia.

== Taxonomy ==
=== 2005 taxonomy ===
In the taxonomy of Bouchet & Rocroi (2005), the clade Nudipleura is arranged as follows:

- Clade Nudipleura
  - Clade Pleurobranchomorpha
  - Clade Nudibranchia
    - Family Bathydeviidae
    - Clade Euctenidiacea
    - Clade Dexiarchia
      - Clade Pseudoeuctenidiacea
      - Clade Cladobranchia
        - Clade Euarminida
        - Clade Dendronotida
        - Clade Aeolidida

=== 2010 taxonomy ===
Jörger et al. (2010) have classified Nudipleura within Heterobranchia as a separate clade as follows:

- Heterobranchia
  - Lower Heterobranchia (including Acteonoidea) - Lower Heterobranchia does not form a clade in the study by Jörger et al. (2010):
  - Euthyneura
    - Nudipleura
      - Pleurobranchomorpha
      - Nudibranchia
    - - Euopisthobranchia
        - Umbraculoidea
        - - - Runcinacea
            - - Anaspidea
              - Pteropoda
          - Cephalaspidea s.s.
      - Panpulmonata
        - - Siphonarioidea
          - Sacoglossa
        - - - Glacidorboidea
            - - Amphiboloidea
              - Pyramidelloidea
          - - Hygrophila
            - - Acochlidiacea
              - Eupulmonata
                - Stylommatophora
                - - Systellommatophora
                  - - Ellobioidea
                    - - Otinoidea
                      - Trimusculoidea
