= Strubellia =

Scientific classification
- Kingdom: Animalia
- Phylum: Mollusca
- Class: Gastropoda
- Subclass: Heterobranchia
- Infraclass: Euthyneura
- Subterclass: Tectipleura
- Superorder: Acochlidiimorpha
- Superfamily: Acochlidioidea
- Family: Strubelliidae; Rankin, 1979
- Genus: Strubellia; Odhner, 1937

Species
- Strubellia paradoxa (Strubell, 1892); Strubellia wawrai Brenzinger, Neusser, Jörger & Schrödl, 2011

Genus of gastropods

Strubellia is a genus of freshwater slugs, shell-less freshwater gastropods, aquatic gastropod molluscs within the superfamily Acochlidioidea. It is the only genus in the family Strubelliidae.

== Taxonomy ==
In 2005, Strubellia was classified in the family Strubelliidae within the superfamily Strubellioidea in the taxonomy of Bouchet & Rocroi.

According to Schrödl & Neusser (2010) Strubellia is in the family Acochlidiidae.

== Distribution ==
Strubellia paradoxa is known only from Indonesia (Ambon Island). Strubellia wawrai occurs in the Solomon Islands.

== Biology ==
The biology of the genus is comparatively well-known. Strubellia species are reddish-brown, slender slugs of 5 to 40 mm length. They live under rocks in streams and creeks on volcanic islands and feed on the contents of calcareous egg capsules of other, herbivorous, snails (family Neritidae) occurring in the same habitat. Their radula is modified for slowly piercing these capsules with a sharp, saw-like central teeth of which some are worn down during the process. Calcareous spicules embedded below the skin help to stabilize the head during feeding; the nutritive contents of the capsules are slowly sucked out.

The kidney and heart of Strubellia and other Acochlidiidae are enlarged compared to otherwise marine Acochlidiacea; this is thought to be an adaptation to the osmotic stresses of life in freshwater.

Strubellia species are unusual among slugs in being sequential hermaphrodites, they become mature as males and later turn into females after copulation (protandry); this involves reorganization of the reproductive organs including loss of the elaborate copulatory organ. Strubellia, and other Acochlidiidae, are thought to have an amphidromous life cycle: they spawn in freshwater; their swimming veliger larvae are then swept downstream into the river’s mouth or sea where they undergo metamorphosis to benthic snails. It is not known how and when larvae or juveniles do this and recolonize their freshwater habitat; it has been suggested that this may even happen by larger, more mobile dispersal vectors.
