= Asperspina =

Scientific classification
- Kingdom: Animalia
- Phylum: Mollusca
- Class: Gastropoda
- (unranked): clade Heterobranchia clade Euthyneura clade Panpulmonata clade Acochlidiacea clade Microhedylacea
- Family: Asperspinidae Rankin, 1979
- Genus: Asperspina Rankin, 1979

Diversity
- 5 species

Synonyms
- Anademaria Rankin, 1979; Antemnella Rankin, 1979; Minicheviellidae Starobogatov, 1983; Minicheviella Starobogatov, 1983

Genus of gastropods

Asperspina is a genus of sea slugs, marine gastropod mollusks within the clade Acochlidiacea.

== Taxonomy ==
Asperspinidae has been listed as a synonym of Parhedylidae in the taxonomy of Bouchet & Rocroi (2005).

Sensu Schrödl & Neusser (2010) is Asperspina is the only genus in the family Asperspinidae. Minicheviellidae is a junior synonym of Asperspinidae.

== Species ==
Species within the genus Asperspina include:

- Asperspina brambelli (Swedmark, 1968)
- Asperspina murmanica (Kudinskaya & Minichev, 1978) - synonym: Minicheviella murmanica (Kuchinskaja & Minichev, 1978)
- Asperspina rhopalotecta Salvini-Plawen, 1973
- Asperspina loricata (Swedmark, 1968)
- Asperspina riseri (Morse, 1976)
