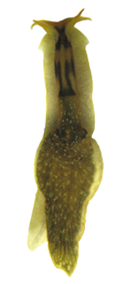
- Acochlidium fijiiensis

Scientific classification
- Kingdom: Animalia
- Phylum: Mollusca
- Class: Gastropoda
- Subterclass: Tectipleura
- Subcohort: Panpulmonata
- Superorder: Acochlidiacea; Odhner, 1937

Families
- (unranked) Hedylopsacea: Acochlidiidae; Pseudunelidae; Aitengidae; Hedylopsidae; Tantulidae; (unranked) Microhedylacea: Asperspinidae: Microhedylidae; Bathyhedylidae

Diversity
- 46 species

Synonyms
- Acochlidiomorpha; Acochlidiida; Acochlidea; Acochlidia

= Acochlidiacea =

Order of molluscs

Acochlidiacea, common name acochlidians, are a taxonomic clade of very unusual sea snails and sea and freshwater slugs, aquatic gastropod mollusks within the large clade Heterobranchia. Acochlidia is a variant spelling.

Schematic drawing of dorsal view of Pseudunela cornuta shows some characteristics of acochlidians, but characteristics of other acochlidians differ greatly: f – foot hb – heart bulb lt – labial tentacle rh – rhinophore vh – visceral hump.

== Description ==
These are mostly very small animals, without a shell or gills, distinguished by the visceral mass being sharply set off from the rest of the body.

Being a small group with only 47 species worldwide known in 2023, this group has been the subject of active research since 2010, by which date only 32 species were named. These slugs are morphologically and biologically highly aberrant and diverse, comprising a series of unusual characters (e.g. secondary gonochorism, lack of copulatory organs, asymmetric radulae). Most acochlidians live interstitially in marine sands, while some have conquered limnic systems (uniquely within opisthobranch gastropods).

== Taxonomy ==
Nils Hjalmar Odhner established this taxon as a family in 1937, when he created the families Microhedylidae and Acochlidiidae. In 1939, he treated this taxon as an order.

Rankin (1979) treated this taxon as an order, the order Acochlidioidea.

Salvini-Plawen (1983) wrote this taxon as Acochlidiomorpha.

Anderson (1992) treated this taxon as the order Acochlidiida.

Burn in Beesley et al. (1998), wrote this taxon as the order Acochlidea.

Wawra (1987) and various authors (2007–2010) spelled this taxon as Acochlidia.

Three families (Hedylopsidae, Microhedylidae and Acochlidiidae) are classically recognized. Two controversial classifications (Rankin 1979, Starobogatov 1983) have been proposed recently, but they have not been evaluated since.

An alternative classification by Burn (in Beesley et al., 1998) for the Australian species recognizes 2 superfamilies and 5 families.

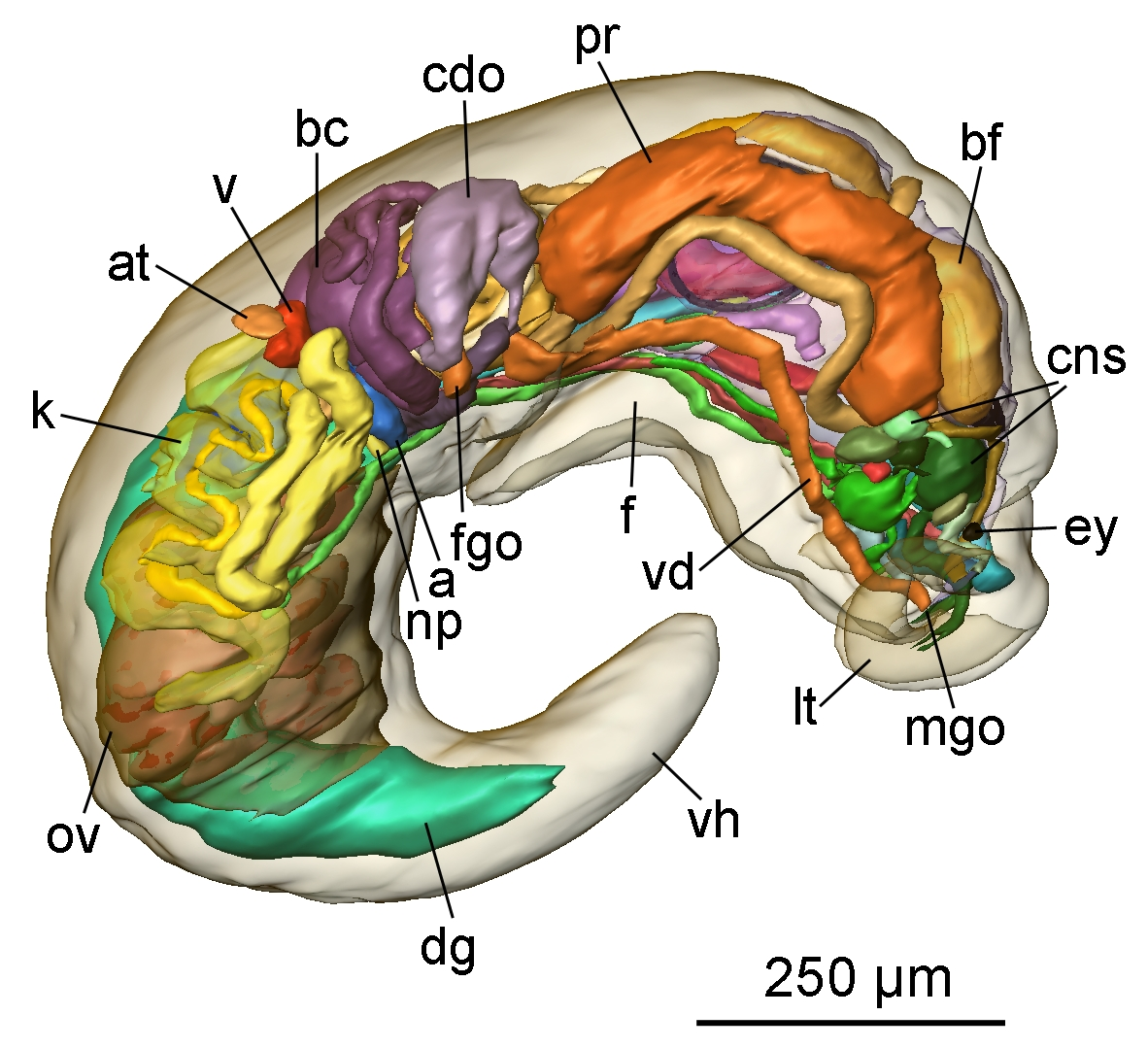
3D reconstructions like this one (Pseudunela cornuta) highly improved knowledge about acochlidians.

The Acochlidia, a traditional "order" of the Opisthobranchia since their establishment by Odhner have formed one of the unsolved mysteries within Euthyneura. Their monophyly is widely accepted especially since a proposed sister group relationship of the acochlidian family Ganitidae with Sacoglossa (based on the dagger-shaped radula teeth) could be rejected based on a comprehensive parsimony analysis of morphological characters. During the last years a series of studies have redescribed key acochlidian taxa in great detail, including 3D reconstructions, and added considerably to the morphological and biological knowledge of this previously little understood group.

Most recent morphological analyses suggested a common origin with either the equally enigmatic Rhodopemorpha, the diaphanid cephalaspidean Toledonia, or with runcinid or philinoid cephalaspideans. Molecular markers independent from direct ecological pressures suggested an unresolved basal opisthobranch origin for Acochlidia (based on nuclear 18S rRNA and 28S rRNA) (Vonnemann et al. 2005). A first combined multi-gene dataset led to the surprising result of Acochlidia clustering in a pulmonate relationship, united in a clade with Pyramidelloidea, Amphiboloidea and Eupulmonata. However, only three derived acochlids were included into analysis prior to 2010, with partially missing data.

=== 2005 taxonomy ===
The taxonomy of Bouchet & Rocroi (2005) tentatively follows Starobogatov (1983), but they have downgraded his taxonomic ranks (suborders to superfamilies, superfamilies to families). The group Acochlidiacea is arranged as follows:

- Superfamily Acochlidioidea
  - Family Acochlidiidae
- Superfamily Hedylopsoidea
  - Family Hedylopsidae
  - Family Ganitidae
  - Family Livorniellidae
  - Family Minicheviellidae
  - Family Parhedylidae
  - Family Tantulidae
- Superfamily Palliohedyloidea
  - Family Palliohedylidae
- Superfamily Strubellioidea
  - Family Strubelliidae
  - Family Pseudunelidae

=== 2010 taxonomy ===
A first comprehensive cladistic analysis of their phylogeny has been established by Schrödl & Neusser (2010), but the identity of their sister group remained uncertain. Morphology-based analyses by Schrödl & Neusser, demonstrated that Acochlidia usually group with other mesopsammic (they live in interstitial spaces of marine sands) taxa, if any were included (i.e. with the sacoglossan Platyhedyle, the rhodopemorph Rhodope or the cephalaspideans Philinoglossa or Philine exigua). Thus, it is likely that convergent adaptations to the interstitial habitat mask the truly phylogenetic signals.

Schrödl & Neusser (2010) split Acochlidiacea into two (unranked) taxa and into six families like this:

==== Hedylopsacea ====
Hedylopsacean Acochlidiacea, whose evolution involves several habitat shifts from marine interstitial to amphibious or freshwater benthic habitats, possess complex excretory and reproductive systems.

(unranked) Hedylopsacea has no superfamilies defined:

- Acochlidiidae: Acochlidium, Palliohedyle, including Strubellia
- Pseudunelidae: with the only genus Pseudunela
- Hedylopsidae: with the only genus Hedylopsis
- Tantulidae: with the only species Tantulum elegans

==== Microhedylacea ====
Microhedylacean Acochlidiacea are exclusively found in interstitial spaces in sediment, and show a tendency toward reduction of complexity in major organ systems.

(unranked) Microhedylacea has no superfamilies defined:

- Asperspinidae: with the only genus Asperspina – junior synonym: Minicheviellidae
- Microhedylidae s.l.: Pontohedyle, Parhedyle, Microhedyle – including Ganitidae: Ganitus and Paraganitus. Inclusion of Ganitidae within Microhedylidae requires further research and higher statistical support.

A multi-locus molecular study by Jörger et al. (2010), included six out of seven acochlidian families. It confirmed Acochlidiacea in a pulmonate relationship, as sister to Eupulmonata. Euthyneura, Opisthobranchia and Pulmonata as traditionally defined were found non-monophyletic. The enigmatic amphibious and insectivorous Aitengidae clusters within Acochlidiacea, as sister to meiofaunal and brackish Pseudunelidae and limnic Acochlidiidae. Inclusion of this small acochlidian group resulted in redefinition of major groups within Heterobranchia, that has led to creation of the new clades Euopisthobranchia and Panpulmonata.

=== 2016 taxonomy ===
Two more families were established. Both include slugs that are unusual among acochlidians for their anatomy and habitat (amphibious, terrestrial, or benthic in deeper waters):

- Aitengidae Swennen & Buatip, 2009
- Bathyhedylidae Neusser, Jörger, Lodde-Bensch, Strong & Schrödl, 2016

== Phylogeny ==
There is no fossil record of Acochlidiacea. Application of a molecular clock allowed estimation of divergence times for these groups. The split between Eupulmonata and Acochlidiacea took place in the Mesozoic, between the Triassic and Jurassic periods. The diversification of Acochlidia is estimated to have happened in the Jurassic with the split between Hedylopsacea and Microhedylacea.

=== Cladogram ===
A cladogram showing phylogenetic relations of some genera and species within Acochlidiacea:

- Acochlidiacea
  - Microhedylacea
    - Asperspina sp.
    - - Pontohedyle milaschewitchii
      - - Paraganitus ellynnae
        - Microhedyle glandulifera
  - Hedylopsacea
    - Hedylopsis
      - Hedylopsis spiculifera
      - Hedylopsis ballantinei
    - - Aiteng sp.
      - - Pseudunela sp. ►
        - - Strubellia paradoxa
          - Acochlidium fijiiensis

== Ecology ==
The life cycle of Acochlidiacea is poorly known. With a typically low reproductive output in Acochlidiacea (max. of 40 eggs in Pontohedyle milaschewitchii), free veliger larvae are assumed to stay in the interstices of the sand grains rather than entering the water column thereby avoiding long distance dispersal. Fertilized eggs are attached to sand grains and might promote dispersal via current driven sediment transport along shorelines.

== Overview of species ==
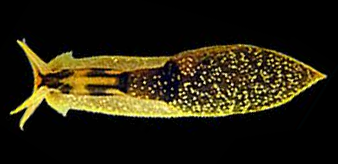
Acochlidium bayerfehlmanni

1. Hedylopsis spiculifera (Kowalevsky, 1901) (Hedylopsidae) – marine
2. Hedylopsis ballantinei Sommerfeldt & Schrödl, 2005 (Hedylopsidae) – marine
3. Pseudunela cornuta (Challis, 1970) (Pseudunelidae) – marine and temporary brackish
4. Pseudunela eirene Wawra, 1988 (Pseudunelidae) – marine
5. Pseudunela espiritusanta Neusser & Schrödl, 2009 (Pseudunelidae) – in brackish water
6. Pseudunela marteli Neusser, Jörger & Schrödl, 2011 (Pseudunelidae) – marine
7. Pseudunela viatoris Neusser, Jörger & Schrödl, 2011 (Pseudunelidae) – marine
8. Aiteng ater Swennen & Buatip, 2009 (Aitengidae) – marine (and brackish)
9. Aiteng marefugitus Kano, Neusser, Fukumori, Jörger & Schrödl, 2015 (Aitengidae) – marine
10. Aiteng mysticus Neusser, Fukuda, Jörger, Kano & Schrödl, 2011 (Aitengidae) – from Japan
11. Bathyhedyle boucheti Neusser, Jörger, Lodde-Bensch, Strong & Schrödl, 2016 (Bathyhedylidae) - marine
12. Strubellia paradoxa (Strubell, 1892) (Acochlidiidae) – freshwater
13. Strubellia wawrai Brenzinger, Neusser, Jörger & Schrödl, 2011 (Acochlidiidae) – freshwater
14. Acochlidium amboinense (Strubell, 1892) (Acochlidiidae) – freshwater
15. Acochlidium bayerfehlmanni Wawra, 1980 (Acochlidiidae) – freshwater
16. Acochlidium fijiiensis Haynes & Kenchington, 1991 (Acochlidiidae) – freshwater
17. Palliohedyle sutteri (Wawra, 1979) (Acochlidiidae) – freshwater
18. Palliohedyle weberi (Bergh, 1895) (Acochlidiidae) – in brackish waters
19. Tantulum elegans Rankin, 1979 (Tantulidae) – freshwater
20. Asperspina brambelli (Swedmark, 1968) (Asperspinidae)
21. Asperspina loricata (Swedmark, 1968) (Asperspinidae)
22. Asperspina murmanica (Kudinskaya & Minichev, 1978) (Asperspinidae)
23. Asperspina rhopalotecta Salvini-Plawen, 1973 (Asperspinidae)
24. Asperspina riseri (Morse, 1976) (Asperspinidae)
25. Microhedyle gerlachi Marcus & Marcus, 1959 - synonym: Parhedyle gerlachi (Ev. Marcus & Er. Marcus, 1959) (Microhedylidae)
26. Microhedyle glandulifera (Kowalevsky, 1901) (Microhedylidae)
27. Microhedyle nahantensis (Doe, 1974) (Microhedylidae)
28. Microhedyle remanei (Er. Marcus, 1953) (Microhedylidae)
29. Ganitus evelinae Marcus, 1953 (Microhedylidae s.l. / Ganitidae)
30. Paraganitus ellynnae Challis, 1968 (Microhedylidae s.l. / Ganitidae)
31. Parhedyle cryptophthalma (Westheide & Wawra, 1974) (Microhedylidae)
32. Parhedyle odhneri (Ev. Marcus & Er. Marcus, 1955) - synonym: Microhedyle odhneri (Ev. Marcus & Er. Marcus, 1955) (Microhedylidae)
33. Parhedyle tyrtowii (Kowalevsky, 1900) (Microhedylidae)
34. Pontohedyle brasilensis (Rankin, 1979) (Microhedylidae)
35. Pontohedyle joni Jörger & Schrödl, 2013
36. Pontohedyle kepii Jörger & Schrödl, 2013
37. Pontohedyle liliae Jörger & Schrödl, 2013
38. Pontohedyle martynovi Jörger & Schrödl, 2013
39. Pontohedyle milaschewitchii (Kowalevsky, 1901) (Microhedylidae)
40. Pontohedyle neridae Jörger & Schrödl, 2013
41. Pontohedyle peteryalli Jörger & Schrödl, 2013
42. Pontohedyle verrucosa (Challis, 1970) (Microhedylidae)
43. Pontohedyle wenzli Jörger & Schrödl, 2013
44. Pontohedyle wiggi Jörger & Schrödl, 2013
45. Pontohedyle yurihookeri Jörger & Schrödl, 2013
46. Helicohedyle dikiki Drainas, Carlson, Jörger, Schrödl & Neusser, 2017 (unassigned to family) – marine
