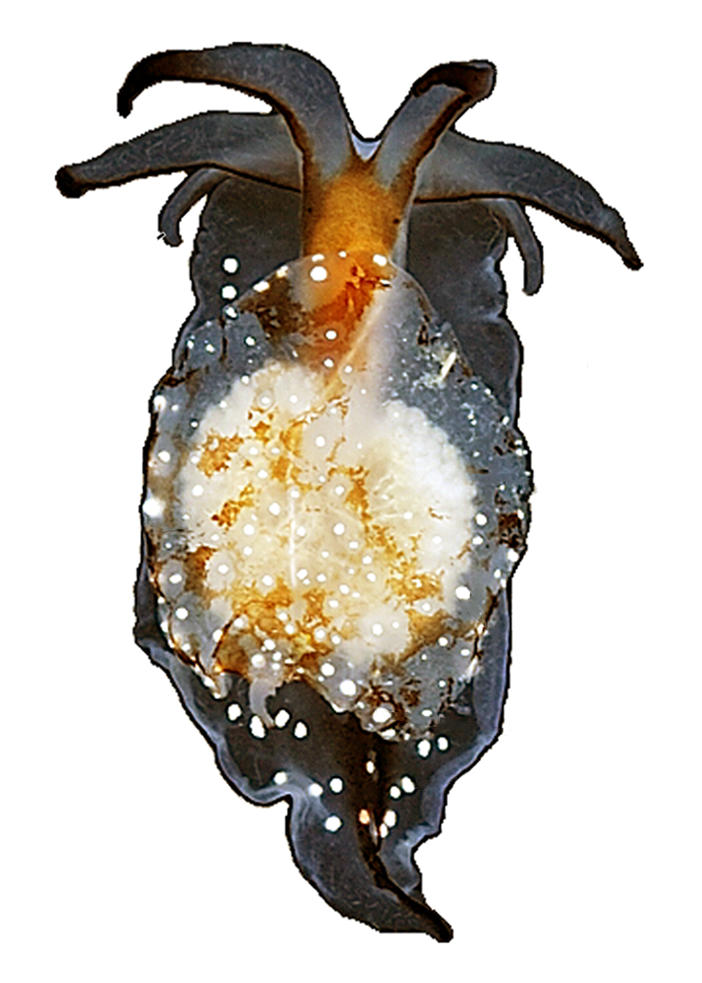

Scientific classification
- Kingdom: Animalia
- Phylum: Mollusca
- Class: Gastropoda
- Subclass: Heterobranchia
- Infraclass: Euthyneura
- Subterclass: Tectipleura
- Superorder: Acochlidiimorpha
- Superfamily: Acochlidioidea
- Family: Bathyhedylidae; Neusser, Jörger, Lodde-Bensch, E. E. Strong & Schrödl, 2016
- Genus: Bathyhedyle; Neusser, Jörger, Lodde-Bensch, E. E. Strong & Schrödl, 2016
- Species: B. boucheti

Binomial name
- Bathyhedyle boucheti Neusser, Jörger, Lodde-Bensch, E. E. Strong & Schrödl, 2016

= Bathyhedyle =

Bathyhedyle Temporal range:

Genus of gastropods

Bathyhedyle boucheti is a species of panpulmonate slug, a deep-sea dwelling gastropod native to the continental slope off the coast of Mozambique. It is the first ever such panpulmonate slug to be discovered at such depths. It is the only species in the genus Bathyhedyle and family Bathyhedylidae. Its radular formula is 1.1.2.

== Physical description ==
Adults have a body length of approximately 9 mm. The animal's head includes two pairs of tentacles, one set of labial tentacles and another set of rhinophores, both sets of which are cylindrical, solid, and taper at their tips. The eyes are located just behind the rhinophores. The animal's creeping foot is three times the width of its head and tapers to a point at the posterior of the animal. The anterior end of the foot also has a pair of propodial tentacles. The animal's head is brown, and the tentacles and foot are semi-translucent. A distinct black stripe extends from the dorsal part of the cephalic tentacles and proceeds to the end of the animal's foot. The body includes a transparent notum which is free and oval-shaped. The notum is as wide as the foot and extends well over half of the body length. Some of the internal organs can be viewed through this structure. The mantle and foot are also covered in small granular white spots. There is no shell, no gills, and no mantle cavity. The animal is able to partially retract its head beneath the notum when disturbed.

== Anatomy ==
=== Nervous system ===
The nervous system is euthyneurous. The cerebral, pleural, and pedal ganglia form the typical molluscan pre-pharyngeal nerve ring. Each cerebral ganglion connects via a broad nerve to its corresponding labial and rhinophore tentacle, though there is no rhinophore ganglion. The animal also lacks optic ganglia and accessory ganglia. Despite the presence of eyes, there appears to be no optic nerve. The pedal ganglia each send one nerve anteriorly and two posteriorly to control the foot. These ganglia are separated by a long, thin commissure and have one statocyst and statolith each, attached dorsally. It has one subintestinal ganglion, one visceral ganglion, one osphradial ganglion, two gastro-esophageal ganglia, one left parietal ganglion, and two buccal ganglia, along with the necessary commissures and connectives.

=== Reproductive system ===
The reproductive system is hermaphroditic and monaulic. The ovotestis forms an incomplete ring around the sides of the large digestive gland. The ampulla is large and tube-shaped.

== Phylogeny ==
Among the most interesting results of molecular studies of this deep-sea animal are that it is closely related to mesopsammic or limnic acochlidiids, and especially the evidence of its sister-group relationship with the amphibious and terrestrial Aitengidae, despite extreme differences in habitat.
