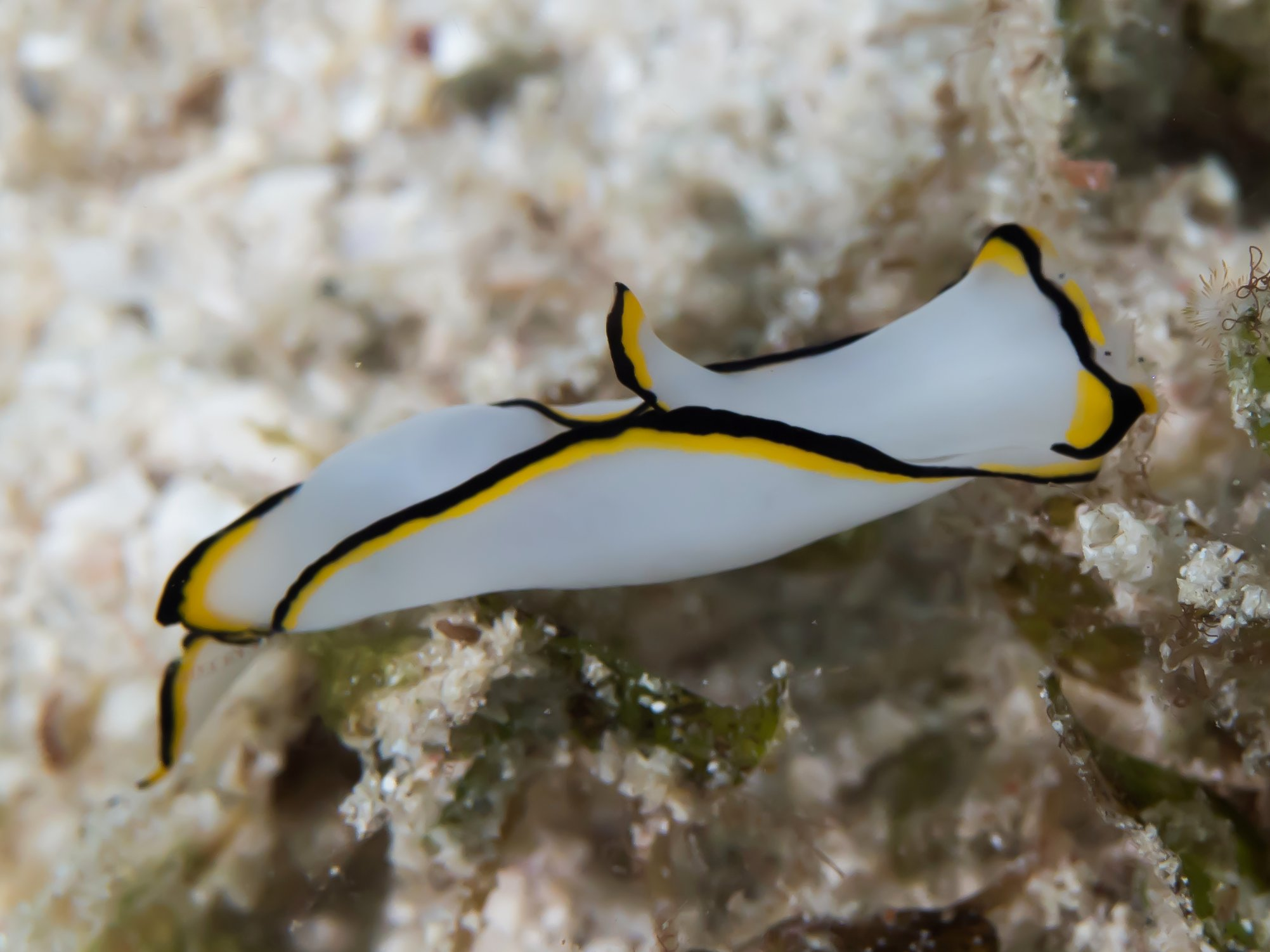
- Chelidonura pallida

Scientific classification
- Domain: Eukaryota
- Kingdom: Animalia
- Phylum: Mollusca
- Class: Gastropoda
- Subterclass: Tectipleura
- Clade: Euopisthobranchia; Jörger et al., 2010

Taxonomic subdivisions
- See text

= Euopisthobranchia =

Taxon of gastropod molluscs

Euopisthobranchia is a taxonomic clade of snails and slugs in the clade Heterobranchia within the clade Euthyneura.

This clade was established as a new taxon by Jörger et al. in October 2010. Euopisthobranchia is a monophyletic portion of the Opisthobranchia as that taxon was traditionally defined but is not a replacement name for that group as several marine opisthobranch orders including Nudibranchia, Sacoglossa and Acochlidiacea are not included.

Euopisthobranchia consist of the following taxa:

- Umbraculoidea
- Anaspidea
- Runcinacea
- Pteropoda
- Cephalaspidea s.s.

== Gizzard ==
Previous studies discussed the gizzard (i.e. a muscular oesophageal crop lined with cuticula) with gizzard plates as homologous apomorphic structures supporting a clade composed of Cephalaspidea s.s., Pteropoda and Anaspidea. A gizzard with gizzard plates probably originated in herbivorous taxa in which it worked like a grinding mill, thus might be secondarily reduced in carnivorous groups within Cephalaspidea s.s. and Gymnosomata. Klussmann-Kolb and Dinapoli considered the gizzard in Umbraculoidea as non-homologous with the one in the previous groups, on account of the absence of gizzard plates or spines. This contradicted Salvini-Plawen and Steiner, who had proposed the gizzard to be a synapomorphy of the larger clade of Paratectibranchia (Pteropoda, Cephalaspidea and Anaspidea) and Eleutherobranchia, secondarily lost in Nudipleura but still present in Umbraculoidea. As coded in Wägele and Klussmann-Kolb, phylogenetic hypothesis by Jörger et al. (2010) supports homology of the gizzard in Umbraculoidea with the gizzard with gizzard plates and spines in the other euopisthobranchian taxa. Thus, the structure is proposed as a synapomorphy of Euopisthobranchia.

== Cladogram ==
A cladogram showing phylogenic relations of the Heterobranchia as proposed by Jörger et al. (2010):

- Heterobranchia
  - Lower Heterobranchia (including Acteonoidea) - Lower Heterobranchia does not form a clade in the study by Jörger et al. (2010):
  - Euthyneura
    - Nudipleura
      - Nudibranchia
      - Pleurobranchomorpha
    - - Euopisthobranchia
        - Umbraculoidea
        - - Cephalaspidea s.s.
          - - Runcinacea
            - - Anaspidea
              - Pteropoda (pteropods include two clades: Gymnosomata and Thecosomata)
      - Panpulmonata
        - - Sacoglossa
          - Siphonarioidea
        - - - Glacidorboidea
            - - Amphiboloidea
              - Pyramidelloidea
          - - Hygrophila
            - - Acochlidiacea
              - Eupulmonata
                - Stylommatophora
                - - Systellommatophora
                  - - Ellobioidea
                    - - Otinoidea
                      - Trimusculoidea

== See also ==
- Changes in the taxonomy of gastropods since 2005#Heterobranchia
- Heterobranchia#2010 taxonomy
- Acochlidiacea#2010 taxonomy
