= Tantulidae =

Scientific classification
- Kingdom: Animalia
- Phylum: Mollusca
- Class: Gastropoda
- Subclass: Heterobranchia
- Infraclass: Euthyneura
- Subterclass: Tectipleura
- Superorder: Acochlidiimorpha
- Superfamily: Acochlidioidea
- Family: Tantulidae; Rankin, 1979

Genera
- Potamohedyle Neusser, Onay, Pirchtner, Jörger & Diez, 2024; Tantulum Rankin, 1979

Family of gastropods

Tantulidae is a family of freshwater slugs, aquatic shell-less gastropod molluscs within the superfamily Acochlidioidea.

== Taxonomy ==
In 2005, Tantulidae was classified as the only family within the superfamily Hedylopsoidea in the taxonomy of Bouchet & Rocroi.

According to Schrödl & Neusser (2010) Tantulidae is in the clade Hedylopsacea.
