= Hedylopsis =

Scientific classification
- Kingdom: Animalia
- Phylum: Mollusca
- Class: Gastropoda
- Subclass: Heterobranchia
- Infraclass: Euthyneura
- Subterclass: Tectipleura
- Superorder: Acochlidiimorpha
- Superfamily: Acochlidioidea
- Family: Hedylopsidae; Odhner, 1952
- Genus: Hedylopsis; Thiele, 1931

Diversity
- 2 species

Synonyms
- Hedylidae Bergh, 1895 (inv.)

Genus of gastropods

Hedylopsis is a genus of sea slugs, marine gastropod molluscs within the superfamily Acochlidioidea.

== Taxonomy ==
Hedylopsidae has been classified within the superfamily Hedylopsoidea in the taxonomy of Bouchet & Rocroi (2005).

Sensu Schrödl & Neusser (2010) Hedylopsis is the only genus in the family Hedylopsidae. It is placed within unranked clade Hedylopsacea.

== Species ==
There are only two species in the genus Hedylopsis:

- Hedylopsis spiculifera (Kowalevsky, 1901)
- Hedylopsis ballantinei Sommerfeldt & Schrödl, 2005
