= Streptacidoidea =

Scientific classification
- Kingdom: Animalia
- Phylum: Mollusca
- Class: Gastropoda
- Subclass: Heterobranchia
- Infraclass: incertae sedis
- Superfamily: †Streptacidoidea; Knight, 1931

Families
- See text

Extinct superfamily of gastropods

Streptacidoidea is an extinct superfamily of fossil sea snails, marine gastropod molluscs in the clade Heterobranchia.

== Taxonomy ==
- † Family Streptacididae
- † Family Cassianebalidae
