= Strubellia paradoxa =

Conservation status
- Endangered (IUCN 3.1)

Scientific classification
- Kingdom: Animalia
- Phylum: Mollusca
- Class: Gastropoda
- Family: Strubelliidae
- Genus: Strubellia
- Species: S. paradoxa

Binomial name
- Strubellia paradoxa (Strubell, 1892)

Synonyms
- Acochlidium paradoxum Strubell

Species of gastropod

Strubellia paradoxa is a species of freshwater slug, a shell-less freshwater gastropod, an aquatic gastropod mollusc within the superfamily Acochlidioidea.

Strubellia paradoxa is one of only two described species in the genus Strubellia.

== Distribution ==
Strubellia paradoxa is known only from Indonesia (Ambon Island).

== Biology ==
The biology of the genus is comparatively well-known. Strubellia species are reddish-brown, slender slugs of 5 to 40 mm length. They live under rocks in streams and creeks on volcanic islands and feed on the contents of calcareous egg capsules of other, herbivorous, snails (family Neritidae) occurring in the same habitat. Their radula is modified for slowly piercing these capsules with a sharp, saw-like central teeth of which some are worn down during the process. Calcareous spicules embedded below the skin help to stabilize the head during feeding; the nutritive contents of the capsules are slowly sucked out.

The kidney and heart of Strubellia and other Acochlidiidae are enlarged compared to otherwise marine Acochlidiacea; this is thought to be an adaptation to the osmotic stresses of life in freshwater.

Strubellia species are unusual among slugs in being sequential hermaphrodites, they become mature as males and later turn into females after copulation (protandry); this involves reorganization of the reproductive organs including loss of the elaborate copulatory organ. Strubellia, and other Acochlidiidae, are thought to have an amphidromous life cycle: they spawn in freshwater; their swimming veliger larvae are then swept downstream into the river’s mouth or sea where they undergo metamorphosis to benthic snails. It is not known how and when larvae or juveniles do this and recolonize their freshwater habitat; it has been suggested that this may even happen by larger, more mobile dispersal vectors.
