= Cassianebalidae =

Scientific classification
- Kingdom: Animalia
- Phylum: Mollusca
- Class: Gastropoda
- Superfamily: †Streptacidoidea
- Family: †Cassianebalidae; Bandel, 1996

Extinct family of gastropods

The Cassianebalidae is an extinct family of fossil sea snails, marine gastropod molluscs in the clade Heterobranchia.
