= Pyrgostylus =

Scientific classification
- Kingdom: Animalia
- Phylum: Mollusca
- Class: Gastropoda
- Subcohort: Panpulmonata
- Superfamily: Pyramidelloidea
- Family: Pyramidellidae
- Genus: Pyrgostylus; Monterosato, 1884

Type species
- Turbo striatulus Linnaeus, 1758

Genus of gastropods

Pyrgostylus is a genus of sea snails, marine gastropod mollusks in the family Pyramidellidae, the pyrams and their allies.

== Species ==
Species within the genus Pyrgostylus include:

- Pyrgostylus striatulus (Linnaeus, 1758)
