= Pyrgostylus striatulus =

Scientific classification
- Kingdom: Animalia
- Phylum: Mollusca
- Class: Gastropoda
- Family: Pyramidellidae
- Genus: Pyrgostylus
- Species: P. striatulus

Binomial name
- Pyrgostylus striatulus (Linnaeus, 1758)

Synonyms
- Melania pallida Philippi, 1836; Parthenia varicosa Forbes, 1844; Turbo striatulus Linnaeus, 1758 (original combination); Turbonilla striatula (Linnaeus, 1758); Turbonilla striolata [sic] (misspelling of Turbonilla striatula (Linnaeus, 1758)); Turritella potamoides Cantraine, 1835

Species of gastropod

Pyrgostylus striatulus is a species of sea snail, a marine gastropod mollusk in the family Pyramidellidae, the pyrams and their allies.

== Distribution ==
This species occurs in the following locations:

- European waters (ERMS scope)
- Greek Exclusive Economic Zone
- Portuguese Exclusive Economic Zone
- Spanish Exclusive Economic Zone
