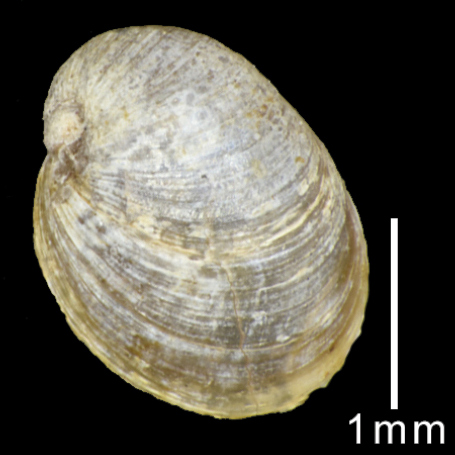

Scientific classification
- Kingdom: Animalia
- Phylum: Mollusca
- Class: Gastropoda
- Superfamily: Otinoidea
- Family: Otinidae; H. Adams & A. Adams, 1855
- Genus: Otina; J. E. Gray, 1847
- Species: O. ovata

Binomial name
- Otina ovata (Brown, 1827)

Synonyms
- Galericulum ovatum Brown, 1827; Helix otis Turton, 1819; Otina otis (Turton, 1819); Otina turtoni Locard, 1886

= Otina =

Otina Temporal range: Upper Jurassic–Recent (range is for Otinidae)

Genus of gastropods

Otina ovata is a species of small, air-breathing sea snail or sea slug, a marine pulmonate gastropod mollusc in the superfamily Otinoidea.

Otina ovata is the only species in the genus Otina. Otina is the only genus in the family Otinidae.

This family was classified within the clade Eupulmonata, which was within the informal group Basommatophora, according to the Taxonomy of the Gastropoda (Bouchet & Rocroi, 2005).

Various authors have referred some North American fossil shells to "Otinidae", but they did not give a genus or species for these records.

== Distribution ==
This species is not common.

It occurs on the coasts of the Northeastern Atlantic Ocean in Western and South-Western Europe:

- British Isles (South and West coasts): Great Britain and Ireland
- Belgium
- Northern France (Manche, Etretat and Atlantic coast)
- Spain
- Portugal
- Sardinia

The type locality is Devonshire, England.

== Description ==
The shell is very small. The shell has 1.5 whorls. The last whorl is inflated. The aperture is oval and very large, like in succineids, columellar and parietal sides of the margin thickened.

The width of the shell is 1.5–3 mm. The height of the shell is 2–5 mm.

The animal cannot withdraw entirely into the shell. Otina ovata has no tentacles.

== Habitat ==
This species breathes air and thus it is found intertidally on rocky shores in such places as caves and rocky overhangs.

Otina ovata lives in intertidal zone on rocks, algae and balanoids. It is often found in empty bivalve shells and moist rock crevices.
