= Tantulum =

Scientific classification
- Kingdom: Animalia
- Phylum: Mollusca
- Class: Gastropoda
- Family: Tantulidae
- Genus: Tantulum; Rankin, 1979
- Species: T. elegans

Binomial name
- Tantulum elegans Rankin, 1979

Genus of gastropods

Tantulum elegans is a species of freshwater slug, an aquatic shell-less gastropod mollusc within the superfamily Acochlidioidea. It is the only species in the genus Tantulum.

This species has no shell. The maximum recorded length is 2 mm.

== Distribution ==
This species occurs in the Caribbean island of Saint Vincent. It was collected at an altitude of 411.5 m.

== Ecology ==
Tantulum elegans are sequential hermaphrodites.
