= Paraganitus =

Scientific classification
- Kingdom: Animalia
- Phylum: Mollusca
- Class: Gastropoda
- Family: Parhedylidae
- Genus: Paraganitus; Challis, 1968
- Species: P. ellynnae

Binomial name
- Paraganitus ellynnae Challis, 1968

Genus of gastropods

Paraganitus ellynnae is a species of sea slug, an acochlidian, a shell-less marine gastropod mollusc in the family Parhedylidae.

Paraganitus ellynnae is the only species in the genus Paraganitus.

== Description ==
Paraganitus ellynnae is smaller than 5 mm and is externally symmetric. It has no shell in adults, and no operculum in adults. It has also no head shield and no posterior shield. It is able to partially retract parts of its anterior body into a temporal visceral cavity. The visceral sac is largely separated from the rest of the body. The mantle is robust. The visceral hump is conical. The tail is short and pointed. The foot is narrow, the anterior foot edge is rounded and it can crawl on the whole foot. It has no mantle cavity. It has elongated/pointed rhinophores. Like all acochlidians, it has oral (= labial) tentacles. Paraganitus ellynnae has long and slightly recurved oral tentacles. Oral tentacle nerves have been present in all examined acochlidians to date, but those nerves were not examined in this species.

Like all acochlidians, it lacks plicate gills. The position of the anus is unknown. It has no calcareous spicules, but it has integumental concrements. It has no keel on the visceral hump.

It has aggregations of precerebral ‘accessory ganglia’. It has no eyes. The presence or absence of Hancock's organ is unknown. It has prepharyngeal CNS as is the case in all other acochlidians.

== Ecology ==
Paraganitus ellynnae is marine and is a mesopsammic species, in other words, these very small slugs live in the interstitial spaces of marine sands.
