= Streptacididae =

Scientific classification
- Kingdom: Animalia
- Phylum: Mollusca
- Class: Gastropoda
- Superfamily: †Streptacidoidea
- Family: †Streptacididae; Knight, 1931

Extinct family of gastropods

The Streptacididae is an extinctfamily of fossil sea snails, marine gastropod molluscs in the clade Heterobranchia.
