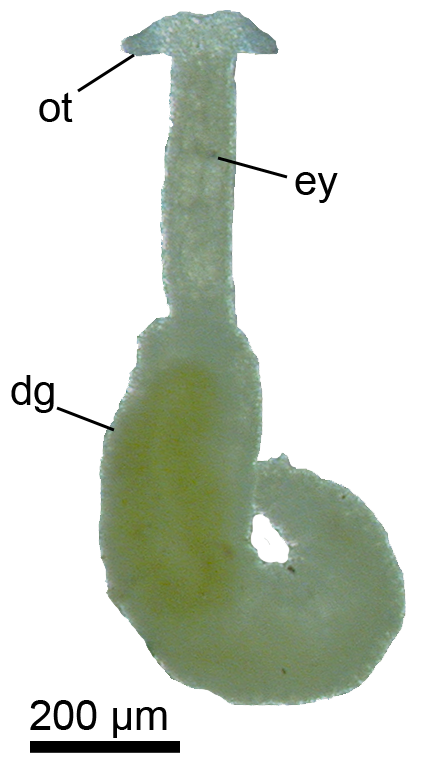
- live Pontohedyle milaschewitchii ot = oral tentacles, ey = eyes, dg = digestive gland.

Scientific classification
- Kingdom: Animalia
- Phylum: Mollusca
- Class: Gastropoda
- Subterclass: Tectipleura
- Subcohort: Panpulmonata
- Superorder: Acochlidiacea
- Family: Parhedylidae; Thiele, 1931

Synonyms
- Ganitidae Rankin, 1979; Livorniellidae Rankin, 1979; Mancohedylidae Rankin, 1979; Microhedylidae Odhner, 1937; Pontohedylidae Starobogatov, 1983; Sabulincolidae Rankin, 1979; Unelidae Rankin, 1979

= Parhedylidae =

Family of gastropods

Parhedylidae are a taxonomic family of sea slugs, marine gastropod mollusks in the superfamily Parhedyloidea.

== 2005 taxonomy ==
Microhedylidae has been listed as a synonym of Parhedylidae in the taxonomy of Bouchet & Rocroi (2005). Ganitidae Rankin, 1979 has been listed as a sole family within Hedylopsoidea. The type genus of Livorniellidae was Livorniella Rankin, 1979.

== 2010 taxonomy ==
Sensu Schrödl & Neusser (2010) is Microhedylidae within the clade Microhedylacea. Parhedylidae is a synonym of Microhedylidae. Microhedylidae s.l. may informally include Ganitidae, but inclusion of Ganitidae within Microhedylidae requires further research and higher statistical support.

== Genera ==
Genera within the Parhedylidae include:

- Ganitus Marcus, 1953 - with the only species Ganitus evelinae Marcus, 1953 - it belongs to Microhedylidae s.l. / Ganitidae
- Microhedyle Hertling, 1930
  - Microhedyle glandulifera (Kowalevsky, 1901)
  - Microhedyle nahantensis (Doe, 1974)
  - Microhedyle odhneri (Ev. Marcus & Er. Marcus, 1955)
- Microhedyle remanei (Er. Marcus, 1953)
- Paraganitus Challis, 1968 - with the only species Paraganitus ellynnae Challis, 1968 - it belongs to Microhedylidae s.l. / Ganitidae
- Paraganitus Challis, 1968
- Parhedyle Thiele, 1931
  - Parhedyle cryptophthalma (Westheide & Wawra, 1974)
  - Parhedyle tyrtowii (Kowalevsky, 1900)
  - Parhedyle gerlachi (Ev. Marcus & Er. Marcus, 1959)
- Pontohedyle Golikov & Starobogatov, 1972

Genera brought into synonymy

- Gastrohedyle Rankin, 1979: synonym of Pontohedyle Golikov & Starobogatov, 1972
- Livorniella Rankin, 1979: synonym of Microhedyle Hertling, 1930
- Mancohedyle Rankin, 1979: synonym of Pontohedyle Golikov & Starobogatov, 1972 (junior objective synontm of Pontohedyle)
- Maraunibina Rankin, 1979: synonym of Pontohedyle Golikov & Starobogatov, 1972
- Parahedyle [sic]: synonym of Parhedyle Thiele, 1931 (misspelling)
- Sabulincola Rankin, 1979: synonym of Parhedyle Thiele, 1931
- Stellaspina Rankin, 1979: synonym of Microhedyle Hertling, 1930
- Unela Er. Marcus, 1953: synonym of Microhedyle Hertling, 1930

== Cladogram ==
A cladogram based on sequences of mitochondrial 28S ribosomal RNA, 16S ribosomal RNA and cytochrome-c oxidase I (COI) genes showing phylogenic relations within the family Microhedylidae:

- Microhedylidae
  - - Microhedyle sp. from St. Vincent
    - - - Ganitus evelinae
        - Paraganitus ellynnae
      - - Microhedyle glandulifera
        - - Parhedyle tyrtowii
          - Parhedyle cryptophthalma
  - Pontohedyle ►
