= Parhedyle cryptophthalma =

Scientific classification
- Kingdom: Animalia
- Phylum: Mollusca
- Class: Gastropoda
- Family: Parhedylidae
- Genus: Parhedyle
- Species: P. cryptophthalma

Binomial name
- Parhedyle cryptophthalma (Westheide & Wawra, 1974)

Species of gastropod

Parhedyle cryptophthalma is a species of sea slug, an acochlidian, a shell-less marine gastropod mollusc in the family Parhedylidae.

== Distribution ==
This species occurs in the Mediterranean Sea.

== Ecology ==
Parhedyle cryptophthalma is marine and is a mesopsammic species, in other words, these very small slugs live in the interstitial spaces of marine sands.
