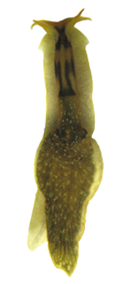
- A live individual of Acochlidium fijiiensis

Scientific classification
- Kingdom: Animalia
- Phylum: Mollusca
- Class: Gastropoda
- Subclass: Heterobranchia
- Infraclass: Euthyneura
- Subterclass: Tectipleura
- Superorder: Acochlidiimorpha
- Superfamily: Acochlidioidea; Küthe, 1935

Families
- See text

Synonyms
- Hedylopsoidea Odhner, 1952 Palliohedyloidea Rankin, 1979 Strubellioidea Rankin, 1979

= Acochlidioidea =

Superfamily of gastropods

Acochlidioidea is a taxonomic superfamily of sea slugs, mostly marine gastropod molluscs.

== Families ==
Families within the superfamily Acochlidioidea:

- Family Acochlidiidae Küthe, 1935
- Family Aitengidae Swennen & Buatip, 2009
- Family Bathyhedylidae Neusser, Jörger, Lodde-Bensch, E. E. Strong & Schrödl, 2016
- Family Hedylopsidae Odhner, 1952
- Family Helicohedylidae Fernández-Simón, Jörger, Brenzinger, Schrödl, N. G. Wilson, Neusser & Moles, 2025
- Family Pseudunelidae Rankin, 1979
- Family Strubelliidae Rankin, 1979
- Family Tantulidae Rankin, 1979
