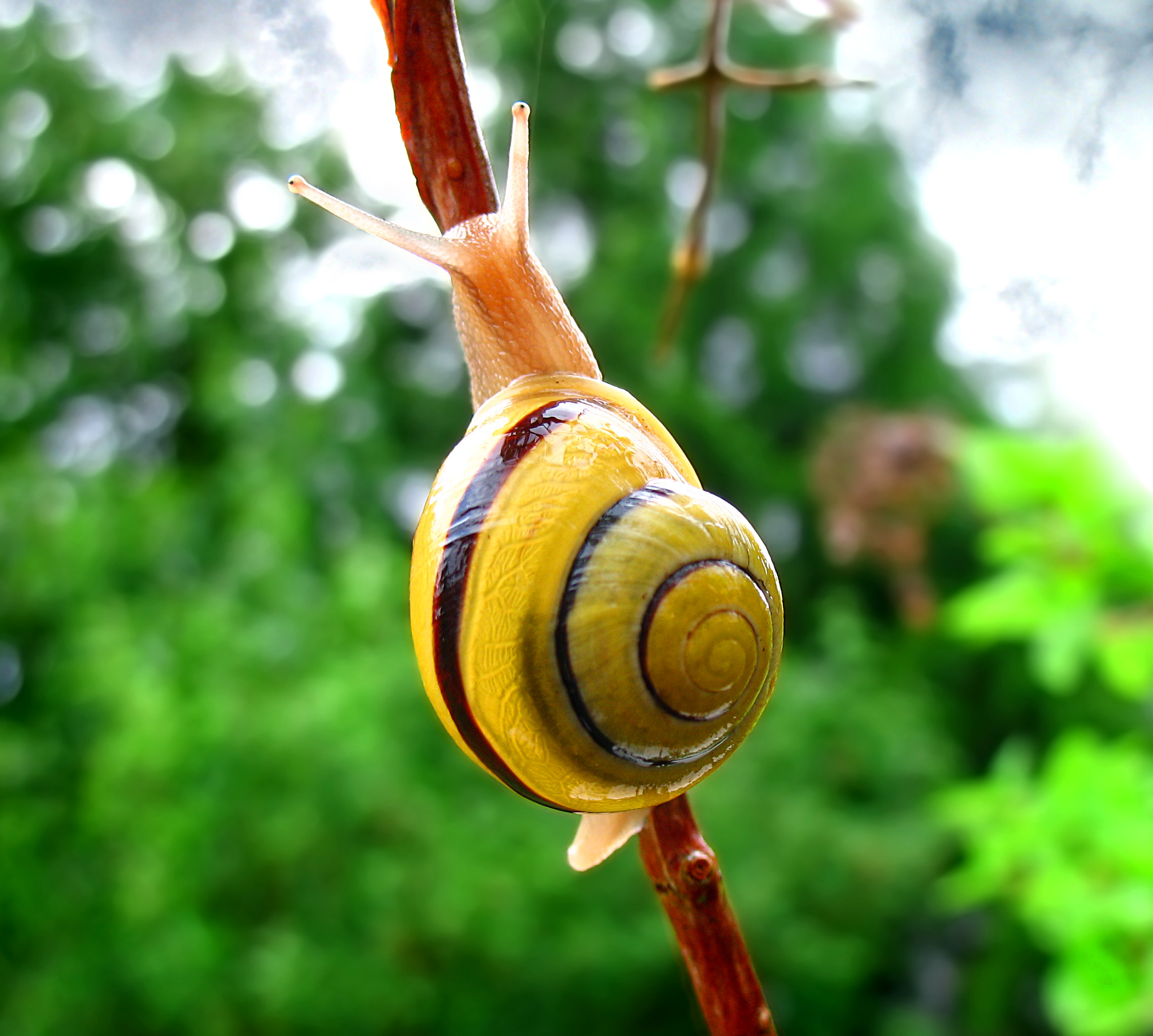
- Cepaea sp.

Scientific classification
- Kingdom: Animalia
- Phylum: Mollusca
- Class: Gastropoda
- Subclass: Heterobranchia
- Infraclass: Euthyneura
- Subterclass: Tectipleura
- Subcohort: Panpulmonata; Jörger et al., 2010

= Panpulmonata =

Clade of gastropods

Panpulmonata is a taxonomic clade of snails and slugs in the clade Heterobranchia within the clade Euthyneura.

Panpulmonata was established as a new taxon by Jörger et al. in October 2010.

The older name "Pulmonata" referred to a group of euthyneuran gastropods which were considered to be "air-breathers". In contrast, "Opistobranchia" grouped various, mostly marine euthyneuran lineages, often with reduced shell. Phylogenetic analyses have shown that none of these two groups was monophyletic. The former "Pulmonata" should also include several groups that lack an air-filled lung (Acochlidiacea, Sacoglossa and Pyramidelloidea). The name "Pulmonata" is also inaccurate when applied to some of the more traditional pulmonate taxa such as Siphonarioidea or Hygrophila, most members of which lack permanently air-filled lungs as well. To emphasize the complete change in taxonomic concepts following from the molecular phylogenetic analyses but keep some continuity in the naming, Jörger et al. (2010) renamed the expanded "Pulmonata" as Panpulmonata.

The clade consists of following taxa:

- Sacoglossa
  - Superfamily Oxynooidea Stoliczka, 1868
    - Oxynoidae Stoliczka, 1868
    - Cylindrobullidae Thiele, 1931
    - Juliidae E. A. Smith, 1885
    - Volvatellidae Pilsbry, 1895
  - Superfamily Plakobranchoidea Gray, 1840
    - Plakobranchidae Gray, 1840
    - Jenseneriidae Ortea & Moro, 2015
    - Limapontiidae Gray, 1847
    - Hermaeidae H. Adams & A. Adams, 1854
    - Costasiellidae K. B. Clark, 1984
  - Superfamily Platyhedyloidea Salvini-Plawen, 1973
    - Platyhedylidae Salvini-Plawen, 1973
- Pneumopulmonata
  - Siphonarioidea
    - Siphonariidae Gray, 1827
  - Acochlidiacea (Acochlidida)
    - Acochlidiidae Küthe, 1935
    - Aitengidae Swennen & Buatip, 2009
    - Bathyhedylidae Neusser, Jörger, Lodde-Bensch, Strong & Schrödl, 2016
    - Hedylopsidae Odhner, 1952
    - Pseudunelidae Rankin, 1979
    - Tantulidae Rankin, 1979
    - Parhedylidae Thiele, 1931
    - Asperspinidae Rankin, 1979
  - Amphiboloidea
    - Amphibolidae Gray, 1840
    - Maningrididae Golding, Ponder & Byrne, 2007
    - Phallomedusidae Golding, Ponder & Byrne, 2007
  - Pyramidelloidea
    - Pyramidellidae Gray, 1840
    - Amathinidae Ponder, 1987
  - Glacidorboidea
    - Glacidorbidae Ponder, 1986
  - Hygrophila
    - Superfamily Chilinoidea Dall, 1870
      - Chilinidae Dall, 1870
      - Latiidae Hutton, 1882
    - Superfamily Lymnaeoidea Rafinesque, 1815
      - Lymnaeidae Rafinesque, 1815
      - Acroloxidae Thiele, 1931
      - Bulinidae P. Fischer & Crosse, 1880
      - Burnupiidae Albrecht, 2017
      - Physidae Fitzinger, 1833
      - Planorbidae Rafinesque, 1815
  - Eupulmonata
    - Stylommatophora
    - Systellommatophora
    - Ellobiida

Caucasotachea atrolabiata

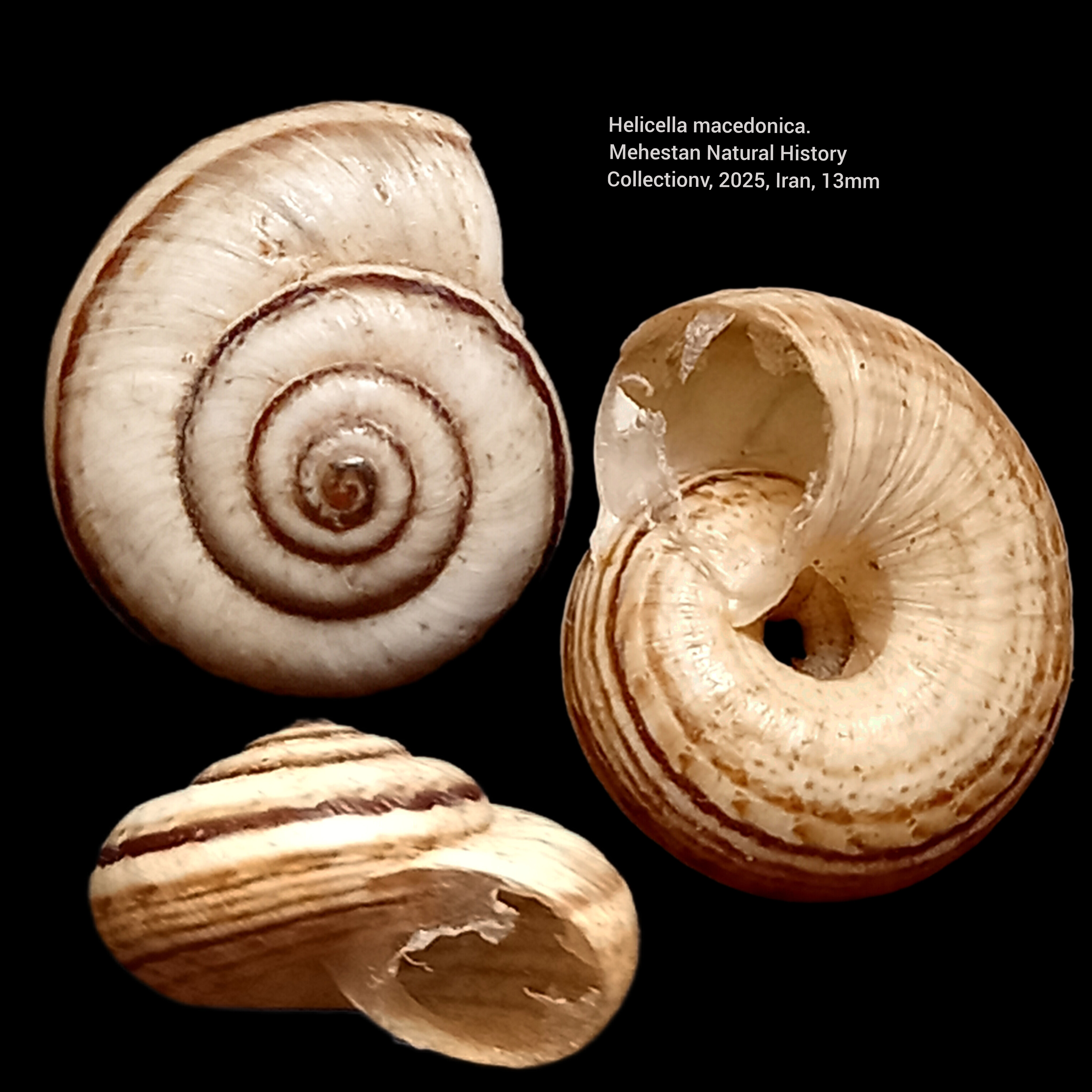
Helicella macedonica

== See also ==
- Changes in the taxonomy of gastropods since 2005#Heterobranchia
- Heterobranchia#2010 taxonomy
- Acochlidiacea#2010 taxonomy
