= Parhedyle =

Scientific classification
- Kingdom: Animalia
- Phylum: Mollusca
- Class: Gastropoda
- Family: Parhedylidae
- Genus: Parhedyle; Thiele, 1931

Genus of sea slugs

Parhedyle is a genus of gastropods belonging to the family Parhedylidae.

The species of this genus are found in Europe.

Species:

- Parhedyle cryptophthalma (Westheide & Wawra, 1974)
- Parhedyle odhneri (Marcus & Marcus, 1955)
- Parhedyle tyrtowii (Kowalevsky, 1900)
