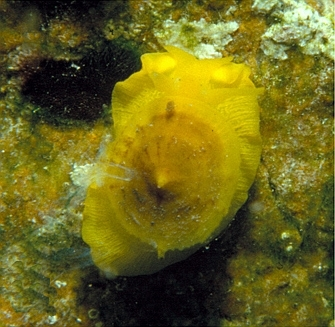
- A live individual of Tylodina perversa in situ

Scientific classification
- Kingdom: Animalia
- Phylum: Mollusca
- Class: Gastropoda
- Clade: Euopisthobranchia
- Superfamily: Umbraculoidea; Dall, 1889 (1827)

Superfamilies
- See text

= Umbraculoidea =

Superfamily of gastropods

Umbraculoidea is a superfamily of unusual false limpets with a thin soft patelliform shell, marine gastropod molluscs in the clade Umbraculida, within the clade Euopisthobranchia.

There are two families in this superfamily, which is listed as the only superfamily in the clade Umbraculida within the informal group Opisthobranchia in the taxonomy of Bouchet & Rocroi (2005).

== Taxonomy ==
A study by Grande et al., published in 2004, concluded that Umbraculoidea was a sister clade to the Cephalaspidea (Acteonoidea excluded).

=== 2005 taxonomy ===
Umbraculoidea contains two families:

- Family Umbraculidae
- Family Tylodinidae

=== 2010 taxonomy ===
Jörger et al. (2010) moved Umbraculoidea to the Euopisthobranchia.
