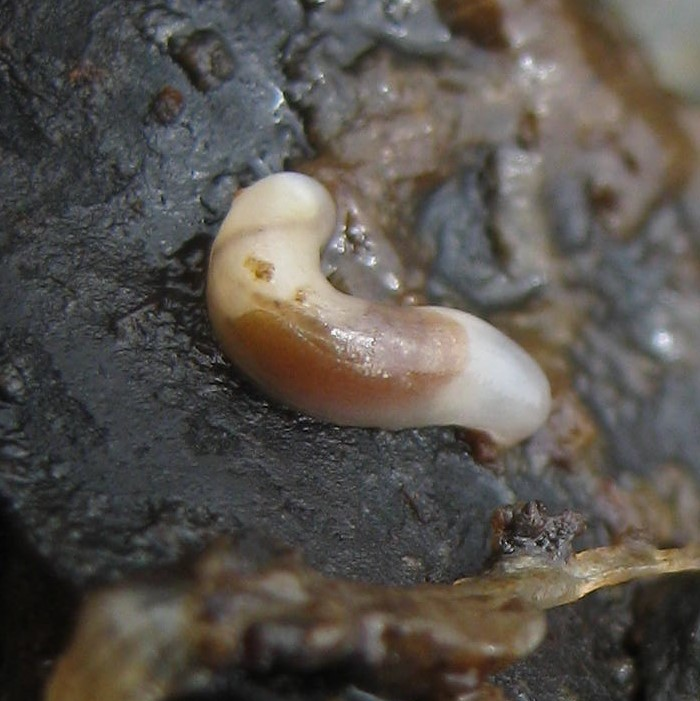
- Smeagol climoi on seaweed buried in gravel, Houghton Bay, Wellington

Scientific classification
- Kingdom: Animalia
- Phylum: Mollusca
- Class: Gastropoda
- Order: Ellobiida
- Family: Ellobiidae
- Genus: Smeagol; Climo, 1980

Diversity
- 5 or 6 species

= Smeagol (gastropod) =

Genus of gastropods

Smeagol is a genus of small air-breathing sea slugs of the upper intertidal zone. They are pulmonate gastropod mollusks related to land slugs and snails.

Analysis of DNA sequences has shown that Smeagol belongs in the family Ellobiidae, and is therefore closely related to ellobiid snails.

== Etymology ==
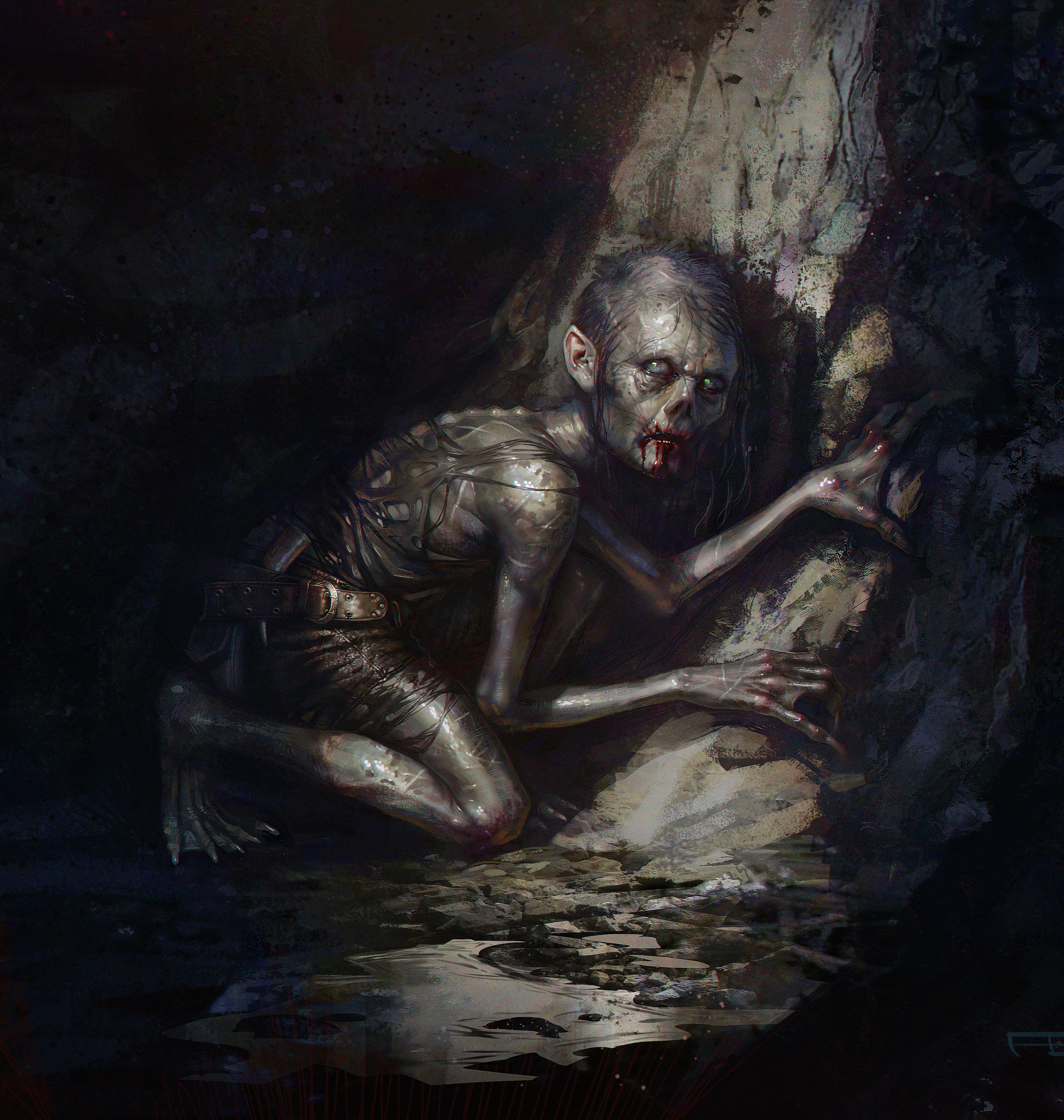
Smeagol was named after Gollum, a fictional character from Tolkien's legendarium

The name of the genus is in honour of Tolkien's fictional character Gollum, who was originally known as Sméagol.

== Taxonomy ==
There are five described species and potentially one undescribed species from Tasmania in the genus Smeagol:

- Smeagol climoi Tillier & Ponder, 1992
- Smeagol hilaris Tillier & Ponder, 1992
- Smeagol manneringi Climo, 1980
- Smeagol parvulus Tillier & Ponder, 1992
- Smeagol phillipensis Tillier & Ponder, 1992

== Anatomy ==
Smeagol manneringi has no tentacles and is a very active blind animal with a size of up to 10 mm.

Smeagol species have no shell. They have a weakly developed snout. The radula is unicuspid and the radular dentition is of the rhipidoglossate type. They have a radular membrane of flexoglossate type. They have no jaw. They have salivary glands with salivary ducts.

The excretory organs are only the left ones, in the pallial cavity. In the circulatory system the haemolymph circulates as follows: mantle → nephridium or nephridia → heart.

These slugs breathe using a pallial lung. They have a contractile pneumostome.

They have a suprapedal gland.

The number of chromosomes is unknown. They have no sex chromosomes.

== Distribution ==
The genus Smeagol is so far restricted to New Zealand and Australia. Smeagol manneringi is known from the south coast of Wellington, and in a possibly genetically distinct form from Kaikōura.

== Ecology ==
These slugs inhabit the upper intertidal zone on gravel substrate.

The development of the veliger is completed in the egg (they do not have a trochophore larval stage).
