= Otinoidea =

- photo of Smeagol sp.

Scientific classification
- Kingdom: Animalia
- Phylum: Mollusca
- Class: Gastropoda
- Superorder: Eupulmonata
- Superfamily: Otinoidea; Adams & Adams, 1855

Families
- See text

Diversity
- 6-7 species

Superfamily of gastropods

Otinoidea is a superfamily of very small, air-breathing sea snails and sea slugs, marine pulmonate gastropod mollusks.

== Families ==
Families within the superfamily Otinoidea:

- Otinidae
- Smeagolidae
