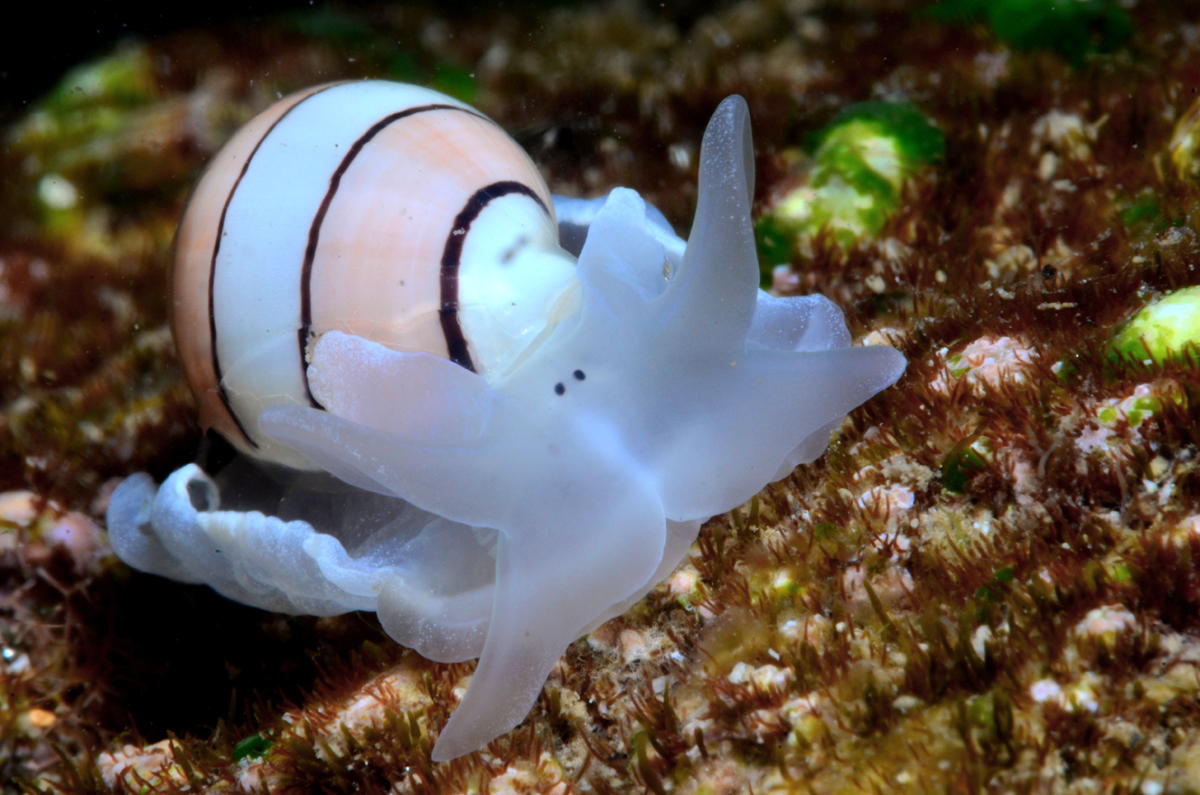
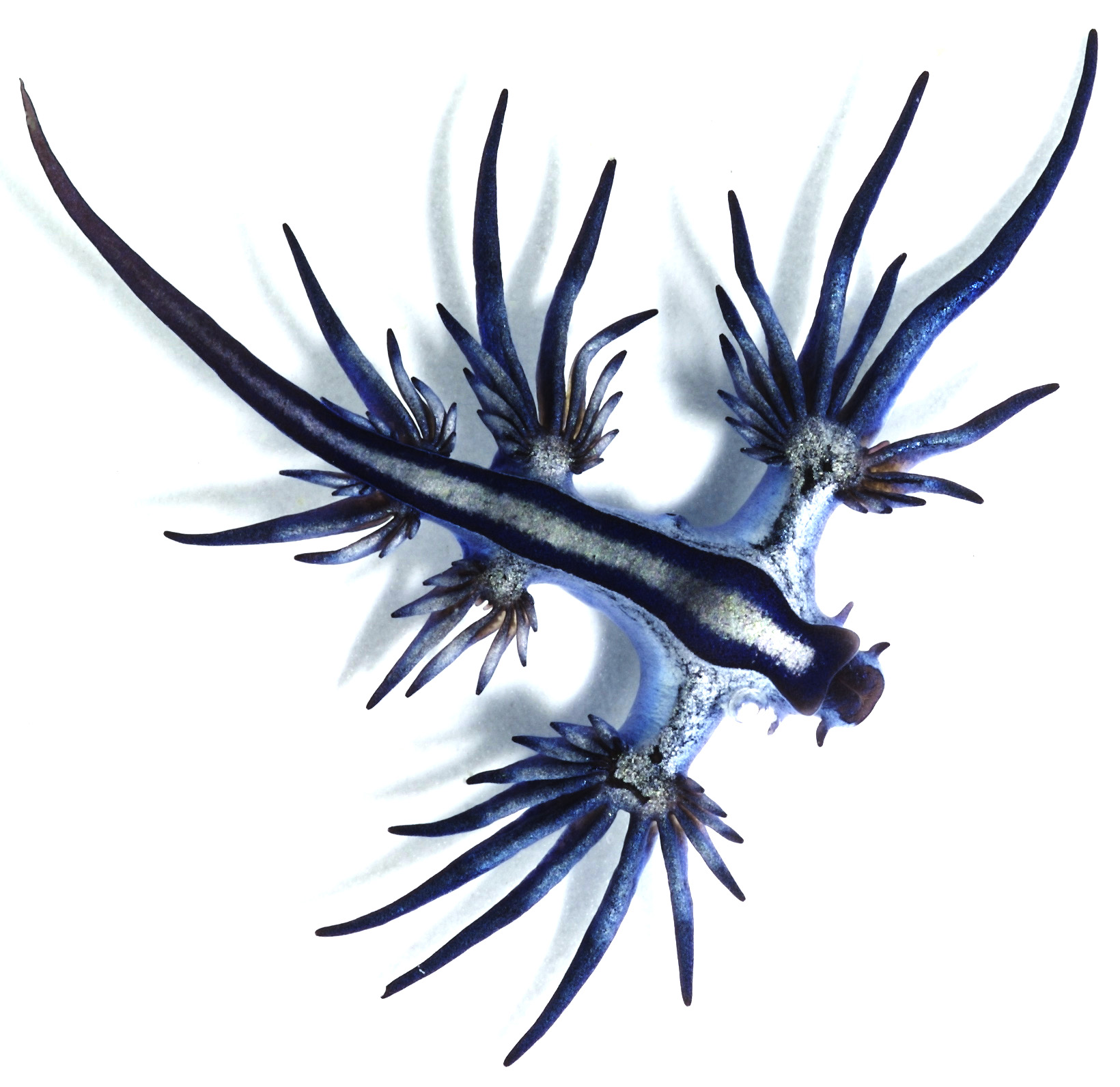
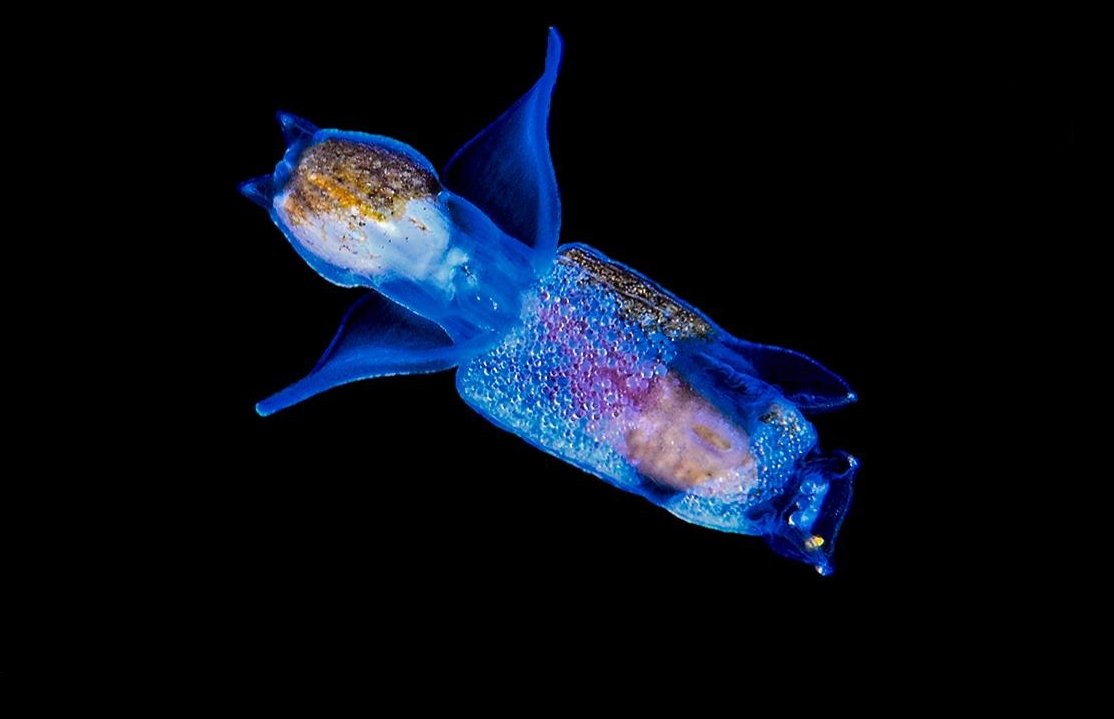
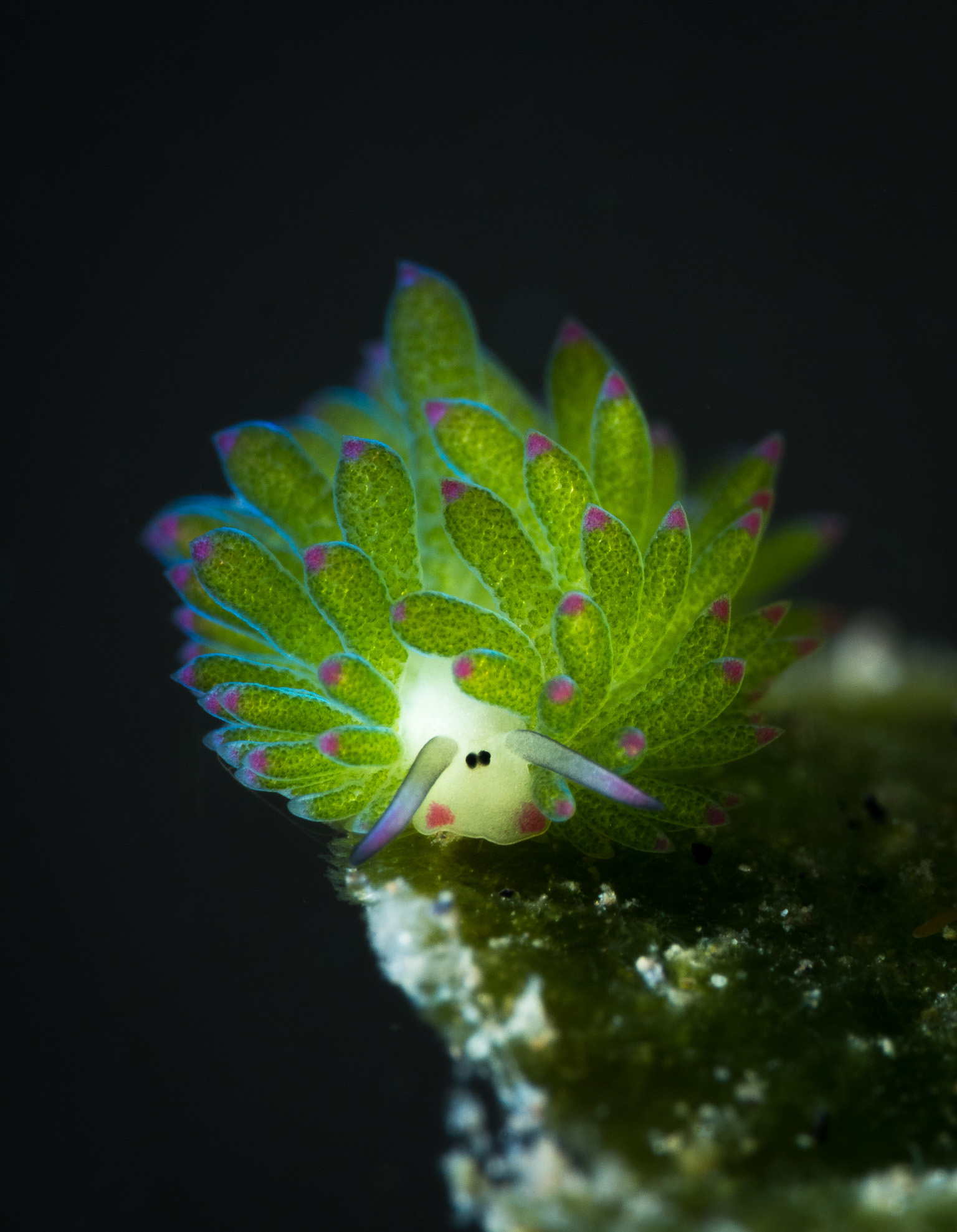
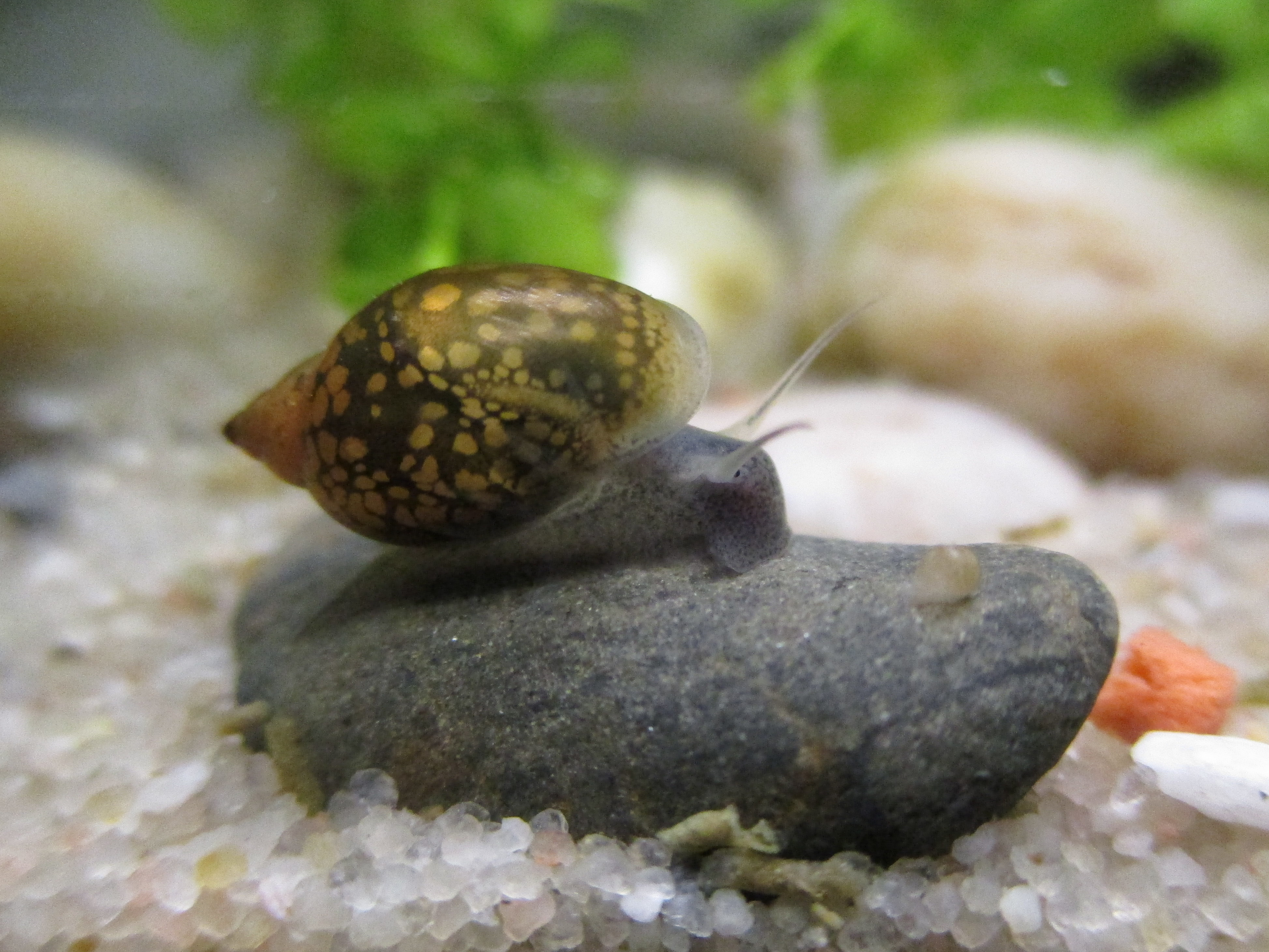
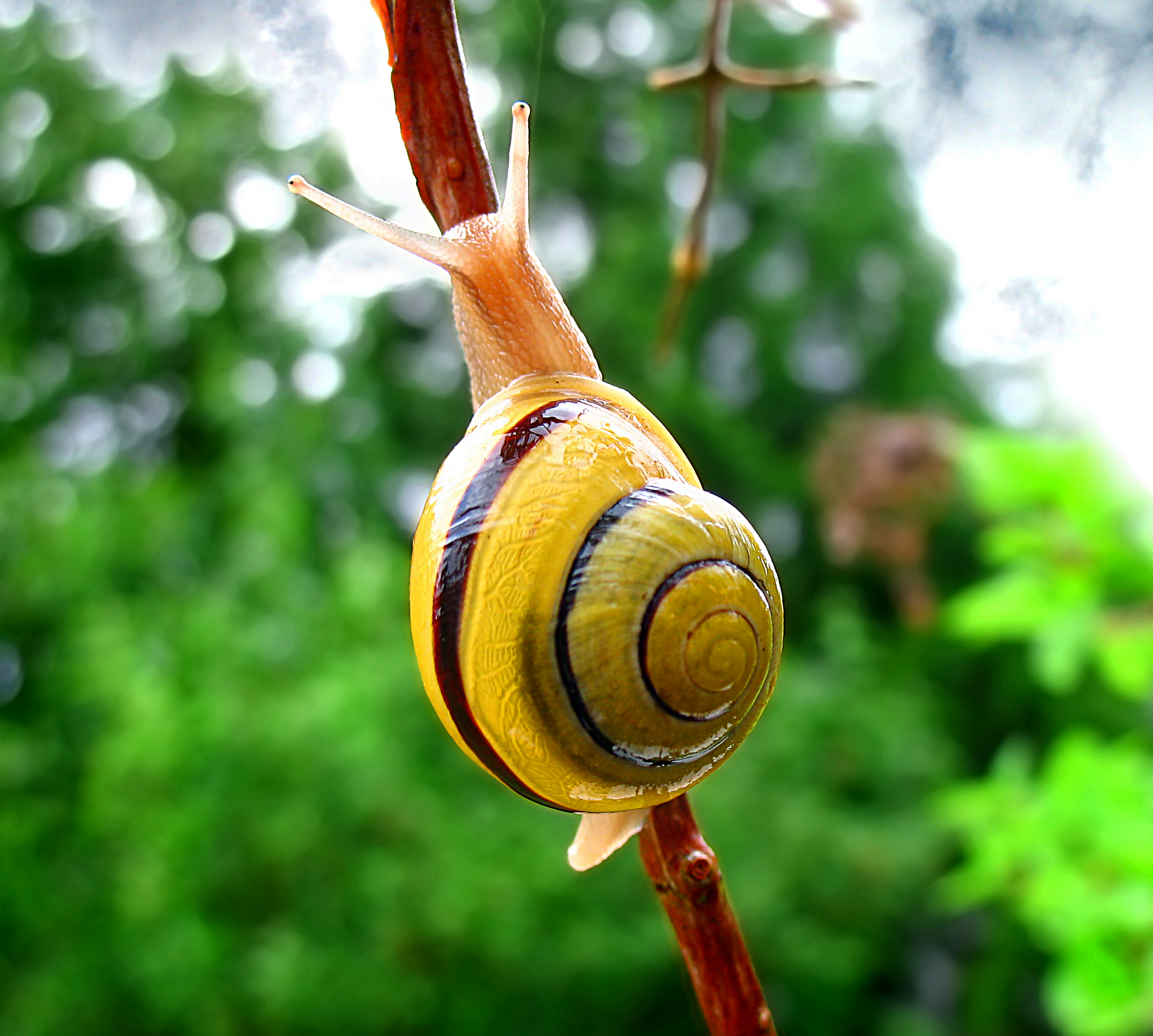
- Various euthyneurans (left to right, top to bottom): Aplustrum amplustre (an acteonoid sea snail), Glaucus atlanticus (a nudibranch sea slug), Pneumodermopsis canephora (a sea angel), Costasiella kuroshimae (a sacoglossan sea slug), Physella acuta (a hygrophilan freshwater snail), Cepaea sp. (a stylommatophoran land snail)

Scientific classification
- Kingdom: Animalia
- Phylum: Mollusca
- Class: Gastropoda
- Subclass: Heterobranchia
- Infraclass: Euthyneura; Johann Wilhelm Spengel, 1881

Subgroups
- Acteonimorpha; Ringipleura; Ringiculimorpha; Nudipleura; Tectipleura; Euopisthobranchia; Panpulmonata

Diversity
- Over 30000 species

= Euthyneura =

Euthyneura Temporal range: Early Triassic–recent

Clade of molluscs

Euthyneura is a taxonomic infraclass of snails and slugs, which includes species exclusively from marine, aquatic and terrestrial gastropod mollusks in the clade Heterobranchia. Euthyneurans are a diverse group, containing about 40% of the known species of gastropods, including the major land snail and slug clade Stylommatophora, which contains over 20,000 species, various sea slug lineages such as nudibranchs, the parasitic sea snail family Pyramidellidae, one of the most diverse families of gastropods with over 6,000 species, and several other lineages of snails and slugs from a variety of habitats.

Historically, euthyneurans were considered to be divided into two groups, the predominantly marine Opisthobranchia, which contained most sea slugs, and the air-breathing Pulmonata. Phylogenetic analyses have since revealed that opisthobranchs are a paraphyletic group, with some lineages more closely related to traditional pulmonates than to other opisthobranchs, and that the non-pulmonate acochlidians and pyramidellids belong among pulmonates. A monophyletic core of Opisthobranchia, named Euopisthobranchia, remains, while pulmonates, acochlidians, pyramidellids, and the closely-related "opisthobranch" group Sacoglossa form the clade Panpulmonata and nudibranchs and their close relatives form an earlier-diverging group.

Euthyneura are characterised by several autapomorphies, but are named for euthyneury, the loss of the torsion that characterizes other groups of gastropods. Euthyneurans can be distinguished from other gastropods by having two distinct pairs of head tentacles, the anterior and posterior tentacles. The anterior pair is specialized for contact chemoreception ("taste"), while the posterior pair is specialized for distance chemoreception ("smell") and detection of currents, and modified into eyestalks in stylommatophoran land snails and slugs. They are considered to be the most successful and diverse group of Gastropoda. Within this taxon, the Gastropoda have reached their peak in species richness and ecological diversity. This obvious evolutionary success can probably be attributed to several factors. Marine Opisthobranchia, e.g., have evolved several clades specialised on less used food resources such as sponges or cnidarians. A key innovation in the evolution of Pulmonata was the colonization of freshwater and terrestrial habitats. The increased sensory capability provided by the specialized tentacles may have also contributed to euthyneuran success.

The superfamily Cylindrobullinoidea have been considered probable euthyneuran predecessors and have a fossil record dating back to the Triassic, around 245 million years ago. They may have arisen from the Carboniferous to Permian allogastropod family Streptacididae. Molecular clock analyses have suggested that euthyneurans began to diversify in the Carboniferous or Permian periods, with an average age estimate of 296 million years.

The closest relatives of euthyneurans are the mesoneurans, a small group of largely enigmatic marine gastropods with characteristics intermediate between euthyneurans and lower heterobranchs.

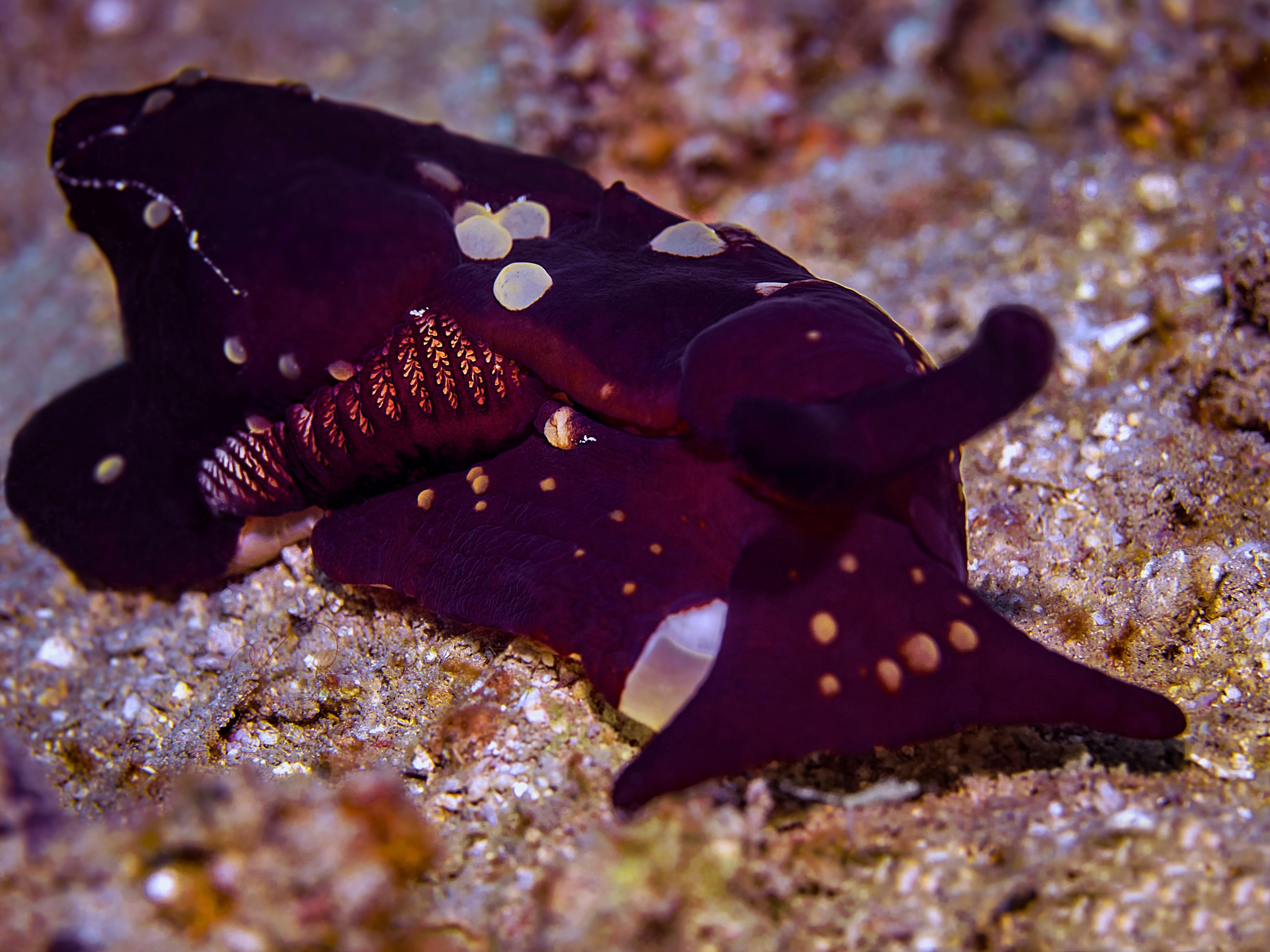
Tomoberthella martensi, a pleurobranch with the gill on the right side.

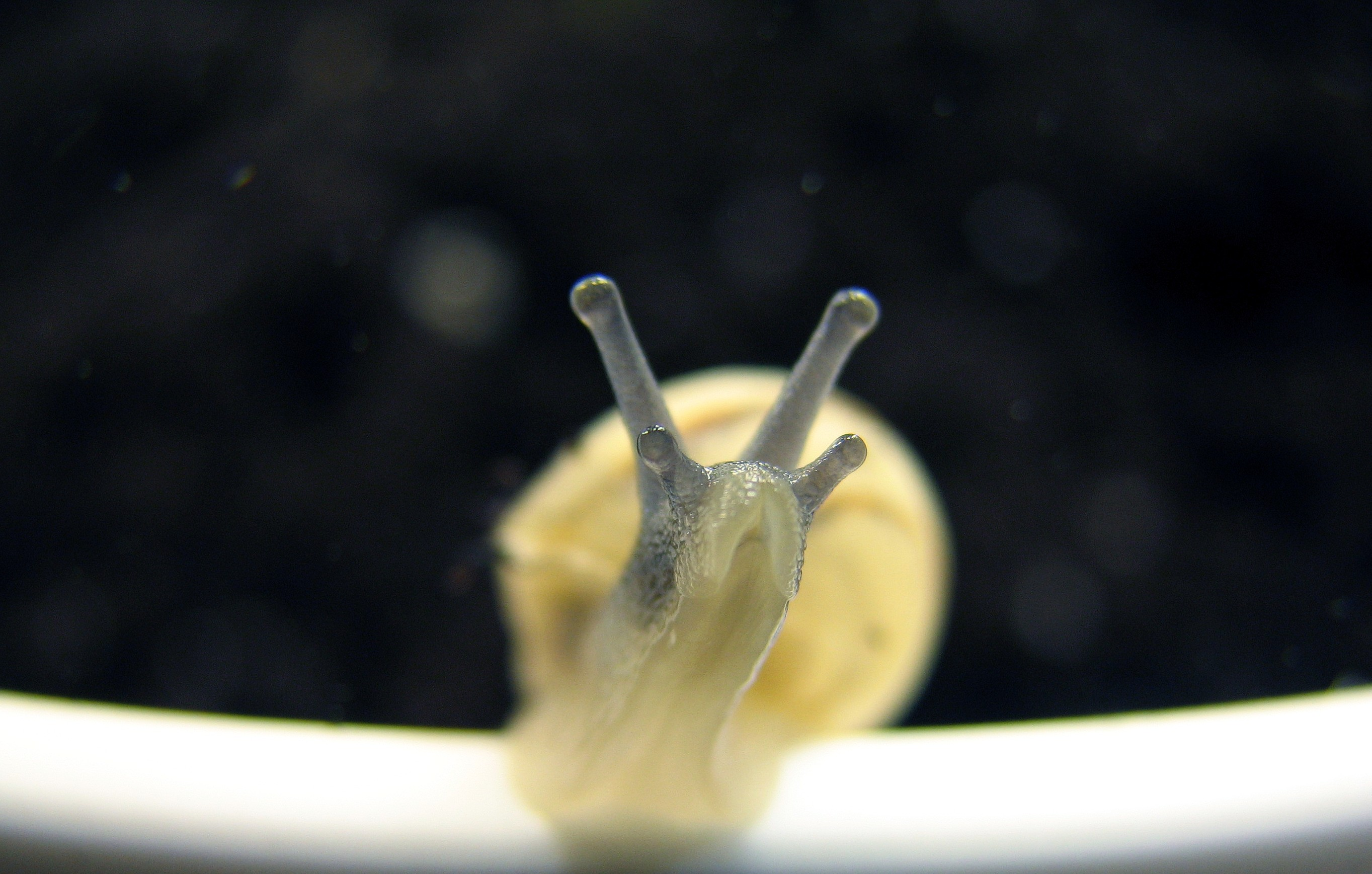
A land snail showing the four tentacles characteristic of Euthyneura

== Taxonomy ==
Various phylogenetic studies focused on Euthyneura: Dayrat et al. (2001), Dayrat & Tillier (2002) and Grande et al. (2004). Morphological analyses by Dayrat and Tillier (2002) demonstrated the need to explore new datasets in order to critically analyse the phylogeny of this controversial group of gastropods. Klussmann-Kolb et al. (2008) traced an evolutionary scenario regarding colonisation of different habitats based on phylogenetic hypothesis and they showed that traditional classification of Euthyneura needs to be reconsidered.

=== 2010 taxonomy ===
Jörger et al. (2010) have redefined major groups within the Heterobranchia and a cladogram showing phylogenic relations of Euthyneura is as follows:

- Heterobranchia
  - Lower Heterobranchia (including Acteonoidea) - Lower Heterobranchia does not form a clade in the study by Jörger et al. (2010):
  - Euthyneura
    - Nudipleura
    - - Euopisthobranchia
      - Panpulmonata

=== 2014 taxonomy ===
Cladogram showing phylogenic relations of Euthyneura sensu Wägele et al. (2014):

- Heterobranchia
  - Lower Heterobranchia
  - Euthyneura
    - Acteonacea
      - Rissoelloidea
      - Acteonoidea
    - Nudipleura
      - Pleurobranchoidea
      - Nudibranchia
        - Anthobranchia
        - Cladobranchia
    - Tectipleura
      - Euopisthobranchia
      - Panpulmonata

=== 2016 taxonomy ===
Kano et al. (2016) proposed a new taxon Ringipleura and classified Ringiculoidea as sister group to Nudipleura:

- Heterobranchia
  - Lower Heterobranchia
  - Euthyneura
    - - Acteonacea
        - Rissoelloidea
        - Acteonoidea
      - Ringipleura
        - Ringiculoidea
        - Nudipleura
    - Tectipleura
      - Euopisthobranchia
      - Panpulmonata
