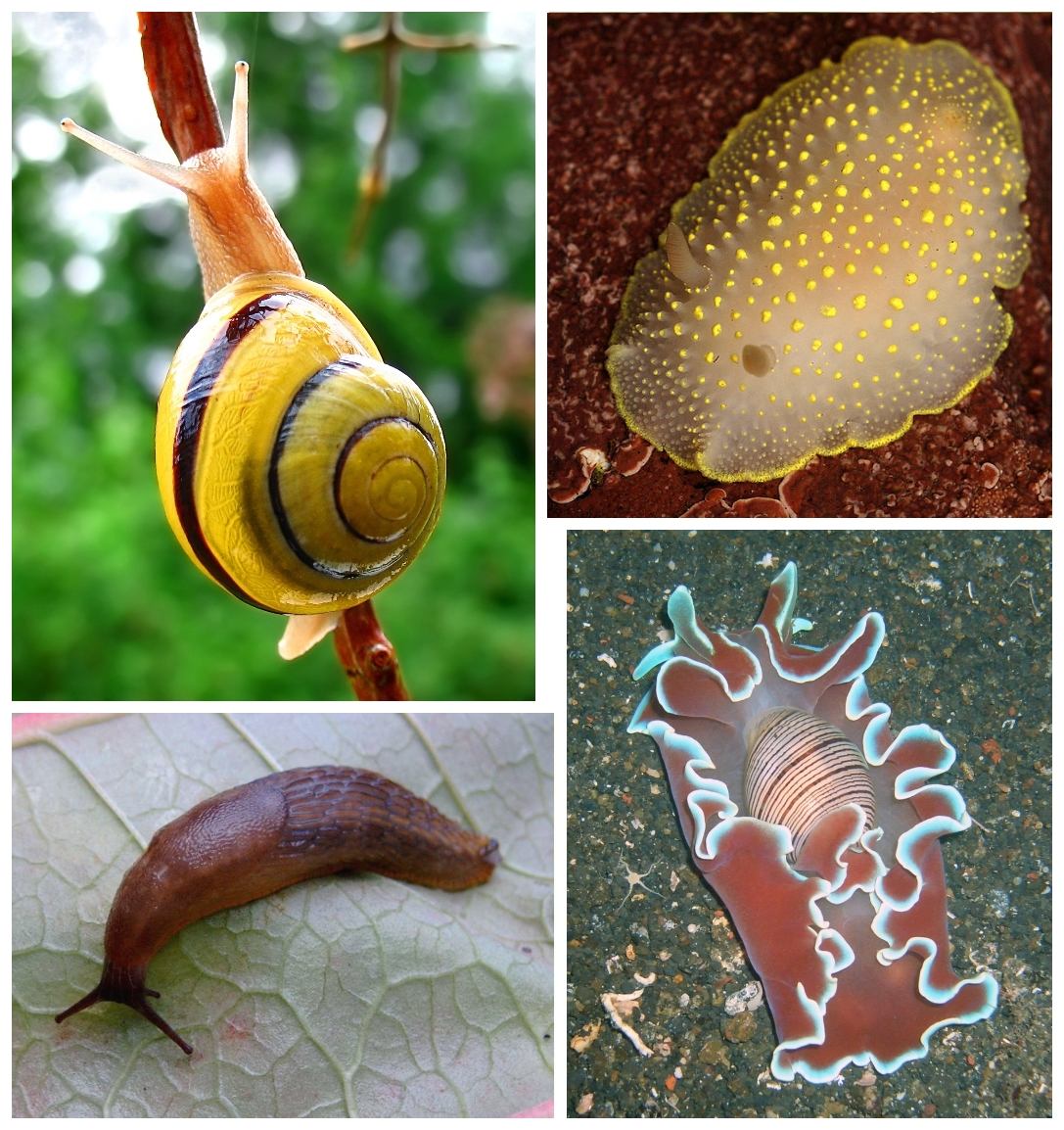
- Four examples of Heterobranchia

Scientific classification
- Kingdom: Animalia
- Phylum: Mollusca
- Class: Gastropoda
- Subclass: Heterobranchia; J. E. Gray, 1840

Subgroups
- "Lower Heterobranchia" (paraphyletic); Architectonicoidea; Cimoidea; Mathildoidea; Omalogyroidea; Orbitestelloidea; Valvatoidea; Tetratentaculata; Mesoneura; Euthyneura

= Heterobranchia =

Heterobranchia Temporal range: Emsian-Present

Clade of gastropods

Heterobranchia, the heterobranchs (meaning "different gill"), is a taxonomic clade of snails and slugs, which includes marine, aquatic, and terrestrial gastropod molluscs.

Heterobranchia is one of the main clades of gastropods. Currently Heterobranchia comprises two groups: the opisthobranchs, and the pulmonates.

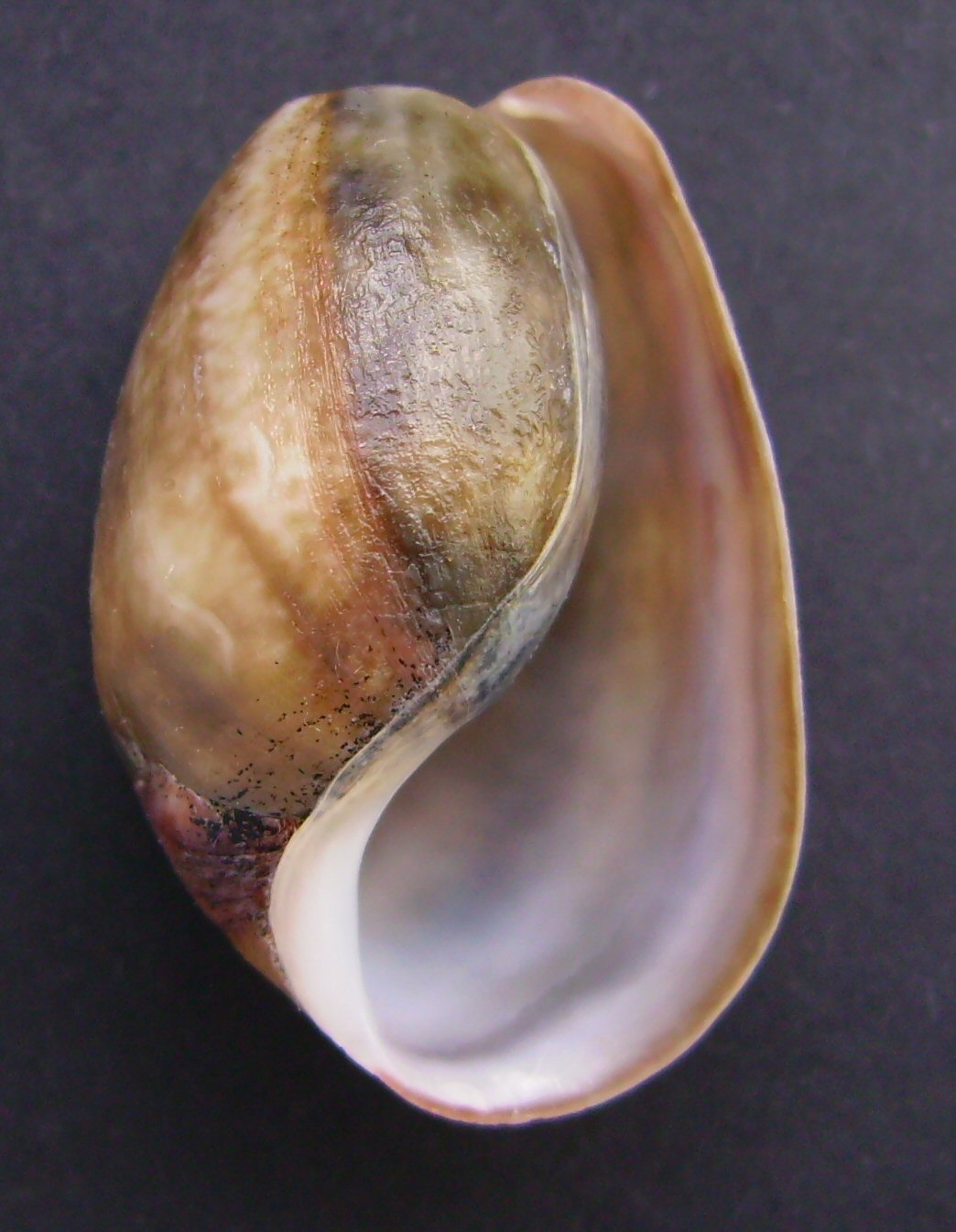
A shell of the marine species Bulla quoyii, which is an opisthobranch.

== Diversity ==
Caucasotachea atrolabiata

The two subdivisions of this large clade are quite diverse:

- Opisthobranchia are virtually all marine species, some shelled and some not, and comprise about 25 families and 2000 species of the bubble shells, the seaslugs, as well as the sea hares. The internal organs of the opisthobranchs have undergone detorsion (unwinding of the viscera that were twisted during torsion).
- The Pulmonata comprises about 20000 species, includes the majority of land snails and slugs, many freshwater snails, and a small number of marine species. The mantle cavity of the Pulmonata is modified into an air-breathing organ. They are also characterized by detorsion and a symmetrically-arranged nervous system. The pulmonates almost always lack an operculum and are hermaphroditic.

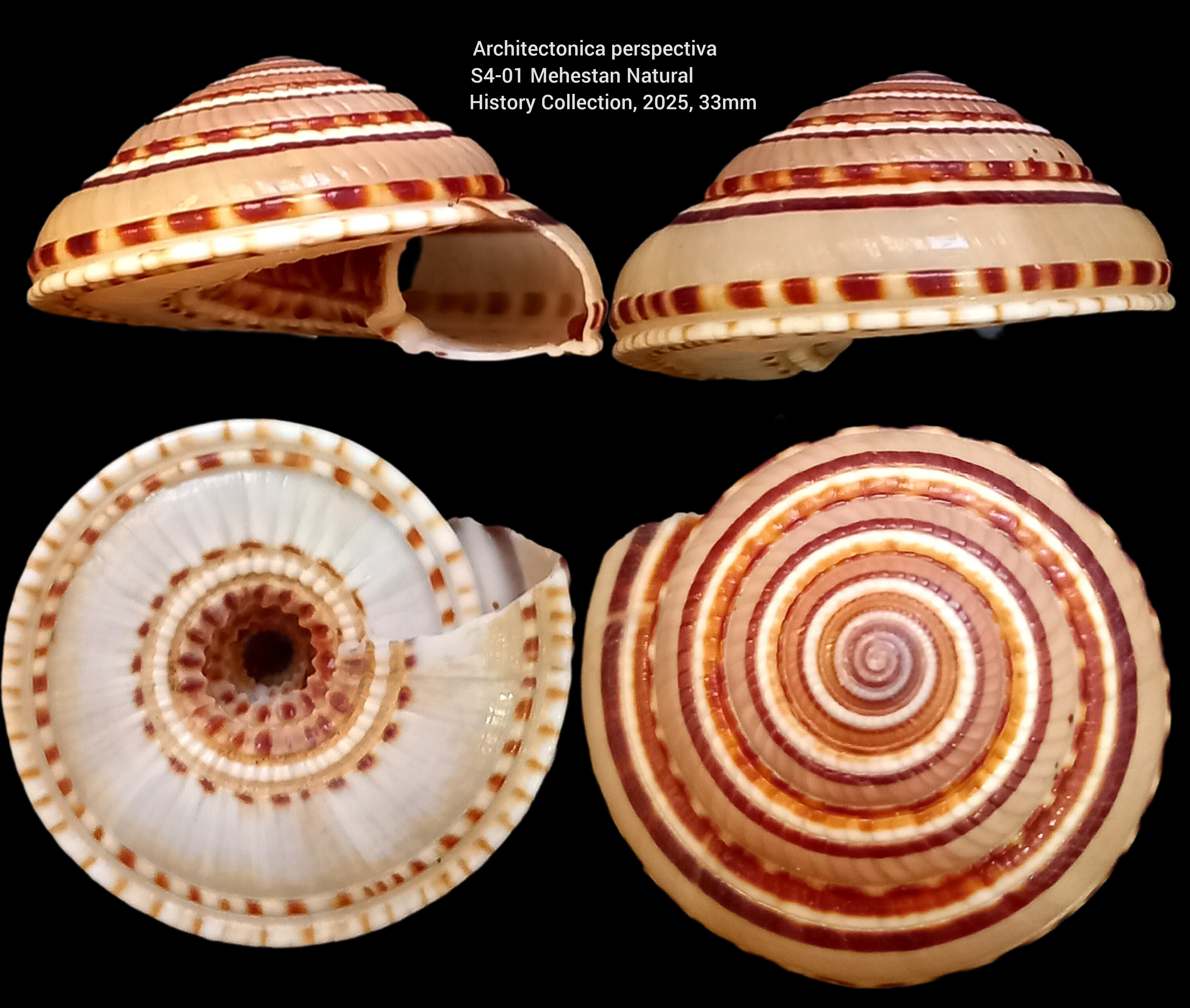
Architectonica perspectiva

== Taxonomy ==
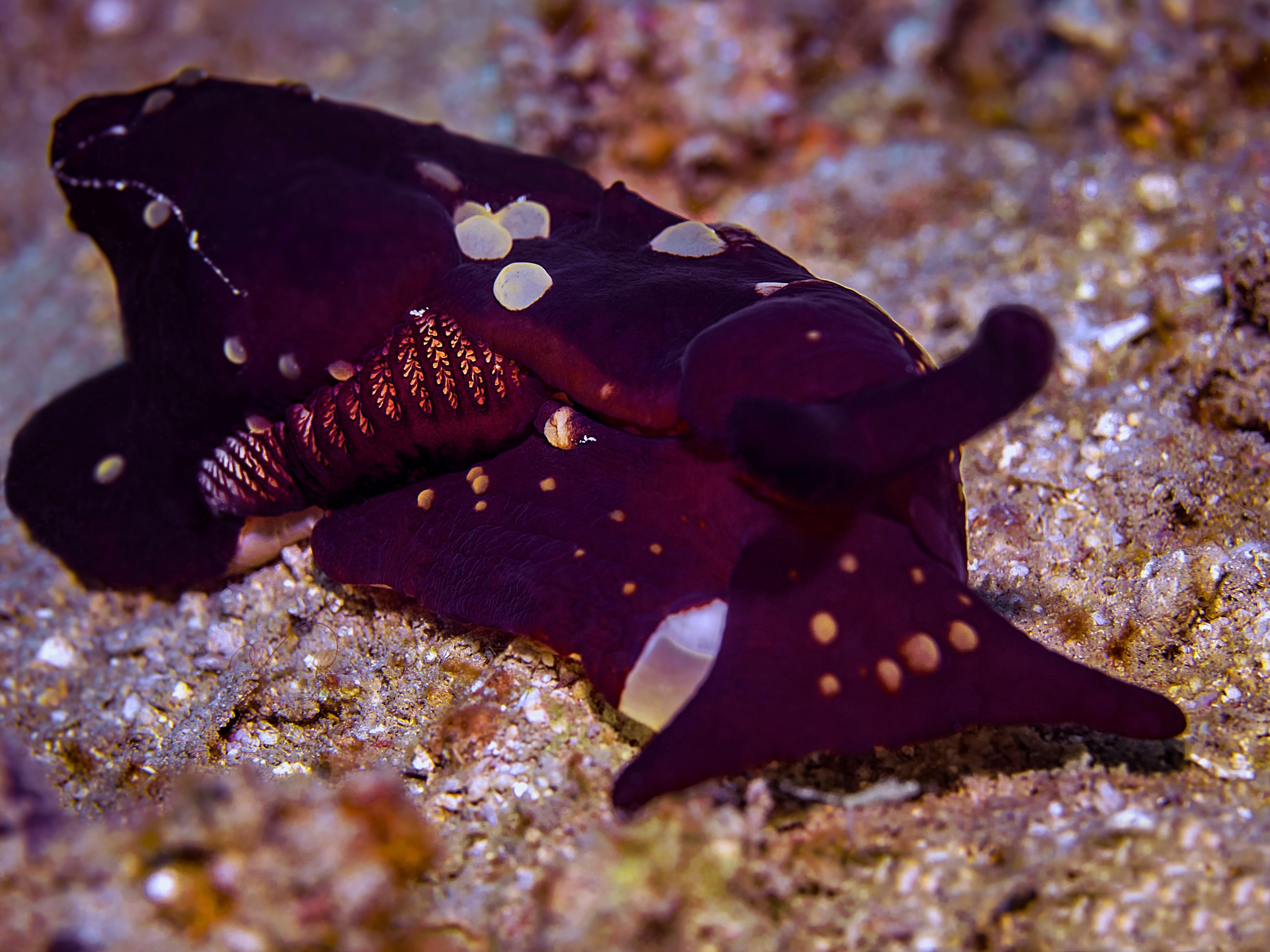
Tomoberthella martensi, a pleurobranch.

=== Current taxonomy ===
Heterobranchia

- Lower Heterobranchia
  - Valvatoidea Gray, 1840
  - Architectonicoidea Gray, 1850
  - Mathildoidea Dall, 1889
  - Omalogyroidea G. O. Sars, 1878
  - Allomorpha
    - Murchisonelloidea Casey, 1904
    - Rhodopoidea Ihering, 1876
  - Orbitestelloidea Iredale, 1917
  - Cimoidea Warén, 1993
- Euthyneura
  - Actenonacea
    - Acteonoidea d'Orbigny, 1843
    - Rissoelloidea Gray, 1850
  - Tjaernoeiidae Warén, 1991
  - Ringipleura
    - Ringiculoidea Philippi, 1853
    - Nudipleura
  - Tectipleura
    - Euopistobranchia
    - Panpulmonata

=== Older taxonomy ===
The families currently included in Heterobranchia have historically been placed in many different parts of the taxonomic class of gastropods. Earlier authors (such as J.E. Gray, 1840) considered Heterobranchia to consist of only marine gastropods, and conceptualized it as a borderline category, intermediate between the Opisthobranchia & Pulmonata, and all the other gastropods.

The (sometimes recognized) category Heterostropha within the Heterobranchia, which includes such families as Architectonicidae, the sundial or staircase snails, is primarily characterized by a shell which has a heterostrophic protoconch, in other words the apical whorls are coiled in the opposite plane to the adult whorls. The classification of this group was revised by Ponder & Warén in 1988.

According to the older taxonomy of the Gastropoda (Ponder & Lindberg, 1997) the Heterobranchia were ranked as a superorder.

=== 2005 taxonomy ===
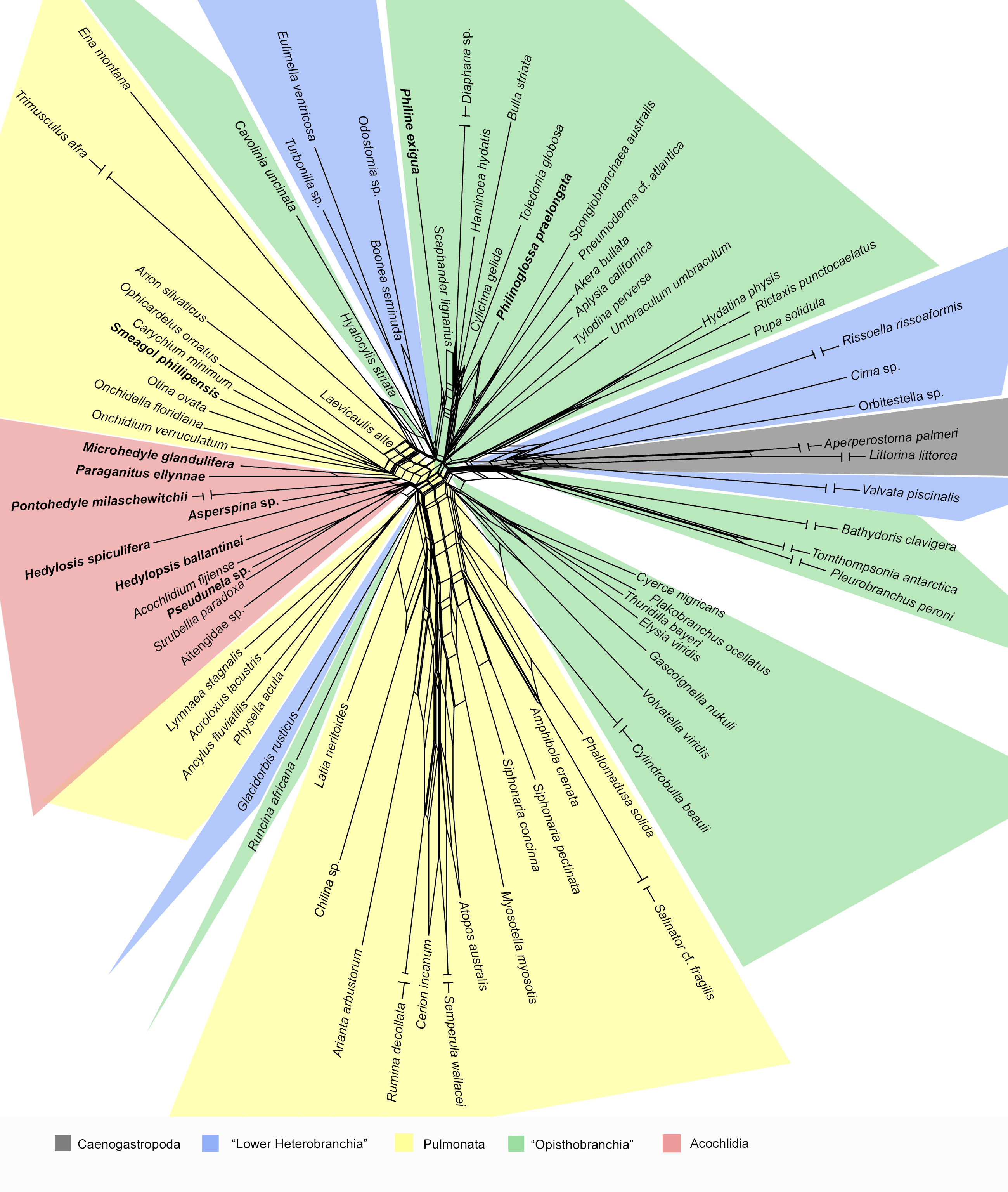
The graph of neighbor-joining phylogenetic tree shows that there is no clade-supporting pattern for the monophyly of Opisthobranchia (green) or of Pulmonata (yellow) based on datasets by Jörger et al. (2010).

Heterobranchia is currently one of the main clades of gastropods. For a detailed taxonomy, see Taxonomy of the Gastropoda (Bouchet & Rocroi, 2005)#Clade Heterobranchia.

=== 2010 taxonomy ===
Jörger et al. (2010) have redefined major groups within the Heterobranchia: they created the new clades Euopisthobranchia and Panpulmonata.

A cladogram showing phylogenic relations of Heterobranchia as proposed by Jörger et al. (2010):

- Heterobranchia
  - Valvatoidea
  - - Orbitestelloidea
    - - Cimoidea
      - - - Rissooidea
          - Acteonoidea
        - Euthyneura
          - Nudipleura
            - Pleurobranchomorpha
            - Nudibranchia
          - - Euopisthobranchia
              - Umbraculoidea
              - - - Runcinacea
                  - - Anaspidea
                    - Pteropoda
                - Cephalaspidea s.s.
            - Panpulmonata
              - - Siphonarioidea
                - Sacoglossa
              - - - Glacidorboidea
                  - - Amphiboloidea
                    - Pyramidelloidea
                - - Hygrophila
                  - - Acochlidiacea
                    - Eupulmonata
                      - Stylommatophora
                      - - Systellommatophora
                        - - Ellobioidea
                          - - Otinoidea
                            - Trimusculoidea
