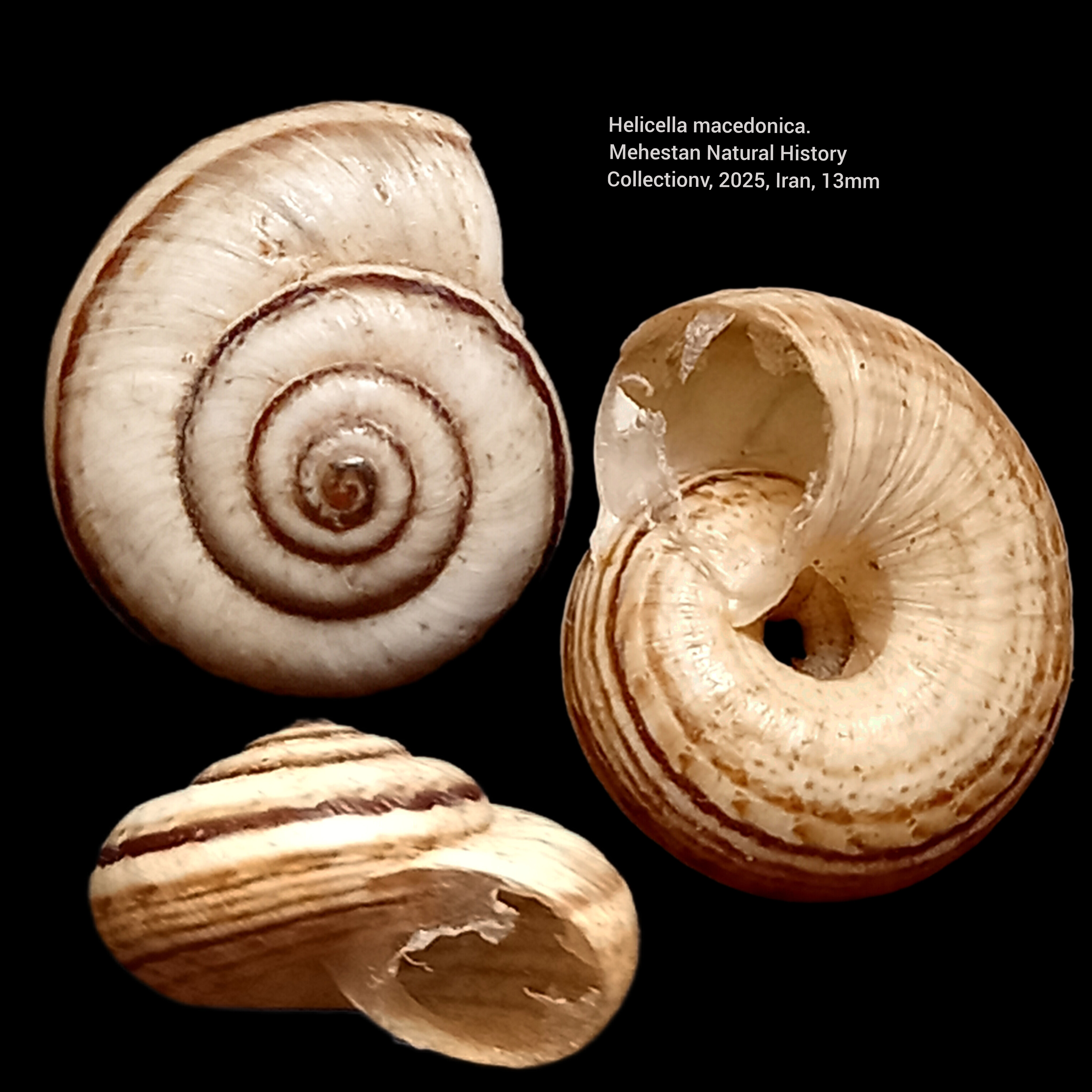
- Helicella macedonica

Scientific classification
- Domain: Eukaryota
- Kingdom: Animalia
- Phylum: Mollusca
- Class: Gastropoda
- Infraclass: Euthyneura
- Subterclass: Tectipleura

= Tectipleura =

Subterclass of molluscs

Tectipleura is a subterclass of land and water-dwelling gastropods.

The group consists of over 27,000 various species, among which are various groups of snails, slugs, and sea hares living across various diverse habitats around the world. It unites the Euopisthobranchia and Panpulmonata.

Tectipleura have existed for over 200 million years.

== Subdivisions ==
- Euopisthobranchia
- Panpulmonata
