= Pseudunela cornuta =

- Schematic drawing of dorsal view of Pseudunela cornuta: f – foot; hb – heart bulb; lt – labial tentacle; rh – rhinophore; vh – visceral hump.

Scientific classification
- Kingdom: Animalia
- Phylum: Mollusca
- Class: Gastropoda
- Family: Pseudunelidae
- Genus: Pseudunela
- Species: P. cornuta

Binomial name
- Pseudunela cornuta (Challis, 1970)

Synonyms
- Hedylopsis cornuta Challis, 1970

Species of gastropod

Pseudunela cornuta is a species of small sea slug, an acochlidian, a shell-less marine and temporarily brackish gastropod mollusk in the family Pseudunelidae. Adults are about 3 mm long and live in the spaces between sand grains.

A complex interactive 3D reconstruction (a 3D visualization based on 420 paraffin histological sections) of the body of an individual of this species has been available since 2009.

== Taxonomy ==
Pseudunela cornuta is the type species of the genus Pseudunela.

Challis, who described the species in 1970, claimed to have deposited the holotype of Pseudunela cornuta, 20 paratypes and a slide with the radula of a further paratype in the Natural History Museum, London; furthermore, he claimed that 10 paratypes and a slide with another radula were deposited in the Museum of New Zealand Te Papa Tongarewa, Wellington; he said that the remaining paratypes and the sectioned material were stored in his private collection.

However, Neusser et al. (2009) found no evidence that the material ever arrived at these destinations. It seemed clear that no type material of Pseudunela cornuta was ever actually deposited in a public institution. Thus Neusser et al. (2009) designed the section series ZSM N° 20071911 (from a newly found specimen from the same collecting site as some of the material that was used for the original description) as a neotype, because of the apparent non-existence of the original type material. The sections of the neotype are deposited in the Zoologische Staatssammlung München, Mollusca Section.

== Distribution ==
Pseudunela cornuta is known from the Solomon Islands. The type locality (for the neotype) is the beach of Komimbo Bay, near Tambea Village, (coordinates: 09°15.843'S, 159°40.097'E).

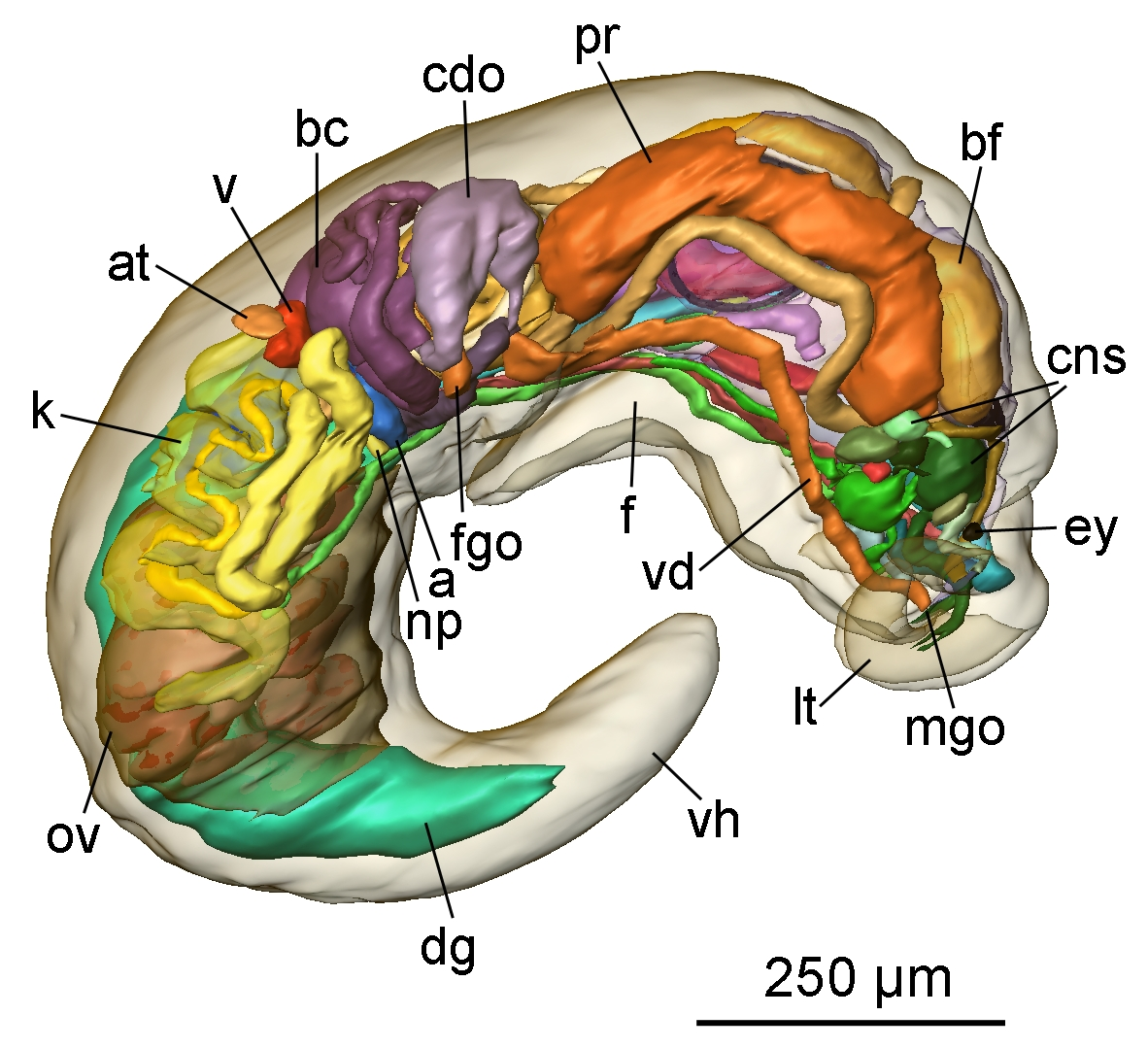
3D reconstruction of the general anatomy of Pseudunela cornuta.

== Description ==
Pseudunela cornuta shows an anterior head-foot complex and a posterior elongated visceral hump in which the animal can partly retract when disturbed. The paired labial tentacles are broad at the base, tapering to the end and usually held at 45°-90° to the longitudinal axis of the specimen. The paired rhinophores are tapered and usually point forward like horns in crawling animals. Eyes are present, but not visible externally. The densely ciliated foot is as broad as the anterior head-foot complex and extends about one third of the visceral hump in the crawling animal. The free end of the foot is pointed.

The size of the worm-like body in living specimens is about 3 mm. The body colour is whitish and translucent. In the anterior part of the visceral hump, the heart bulb is visible externally on the right side of the body. A few elongate, subepidermal spicules of up to 40 μm in length can be found in the posterior part of the visceral hump.

Organ complexity as seen in Pseudunela cornuta (regarding excretory and reproductive features, at least) represents innovations that evolved in small, mesopsammic marine acochlidians.

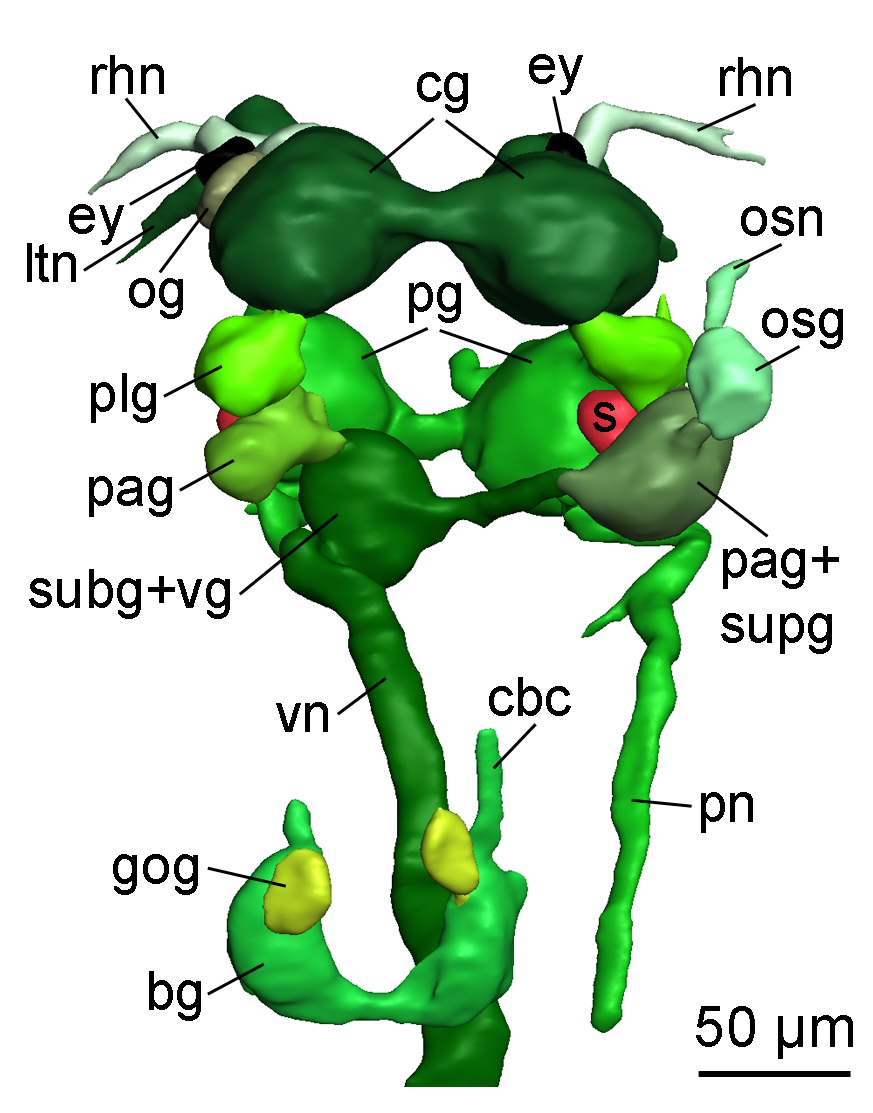
3D reconstruction of dorsal view of the central nervous system of Pseudunela cornuta shows ganglia and their interconnections with nerves.

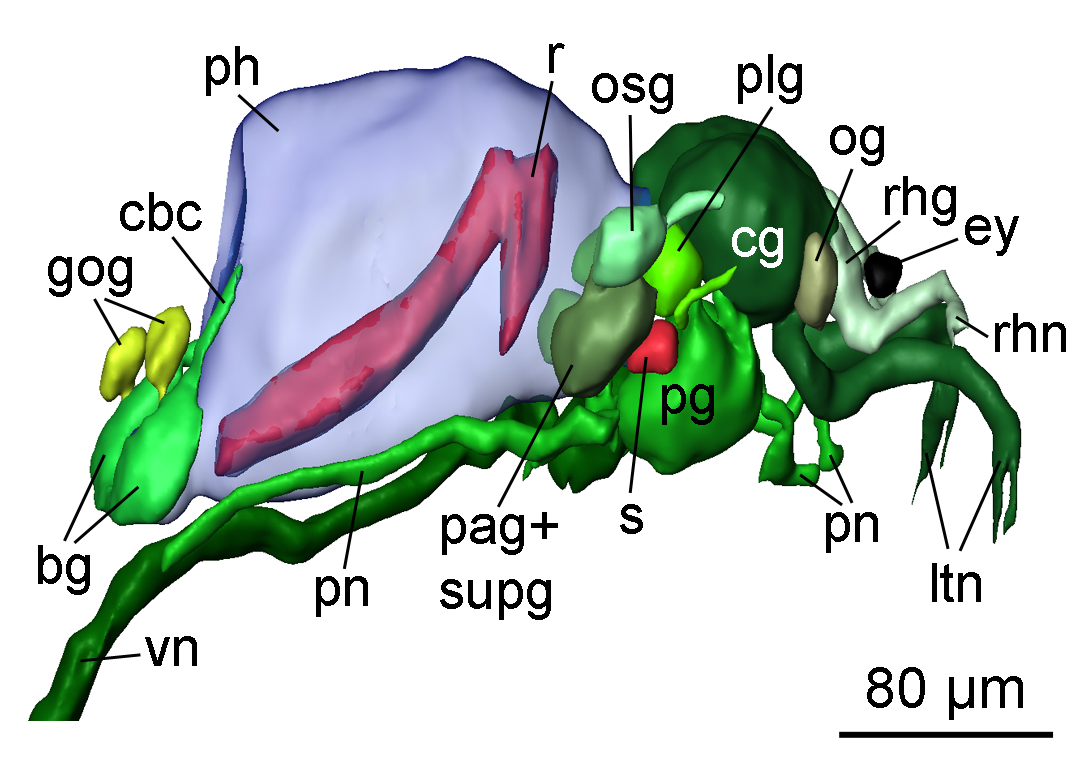
3D reconstruction of the right view of the central nervous system of Pseudunela cornuta.

=== Central nervous system ===
The central nervous system of Pseudunela cornuta is euthyneurous and composed of the paired cerebral, rhinophoral, optic, pedal, pleural, buccal and gastro-oesophageal ganglia as well as three distinct ganglia on the visceral nerve cord, plus a presumed osphradial ganglion. All ganglia excluding the buccal and gastro-oesophageal ganglia are situated pre-pharyngeally. The central nervous system is epiathroid; the pleural ganglion is located closer to the cerebral ganglion than to the pedal one. All ganglia consist of an outer cortex containing the nuclei and an inner medulla. The large cerebral ganglia are linked by a robust commissure and lie dorsal to the pedal ganglia. Anteroventrally, the robust labiotentacular nerve emerges innervating the labial tentacle. A rhinophoral ganglion is situated anterodorsally to each cerebral ganglion connected by a short, single cerebro-rhinophoral connective. The rhinophoral nerve arises from the rhinophoral ganglion extending to the rhinophore. A small, unpigmented eye is connected by the thin optic nerve to the rhinophoral nerve, slightly anterior to the rhinophoral ganglion. An optic ganglion is attached laterally to each cerebral ganglion and connected to the latter by a thin nerve. The optic ganglion is surrounded by an additional layer of connective tissue shared with the cerebral ganglion. Precerebral anterior accessory ganglia, as described for microhedylacean acochlidians and Tantulum elegans, are absent. A Hancock's organ could not be detected.

The paired pedal ganglia lie posteroventrally to the cerebral ganglia, and are connected by a commissure which is slightly longer than the cerebral commissure. A statocyst with a single otolith is attached dorsally to each pedal ganglion. The static nerve could not be detected. Two pedal nerves emerge from each pedal ganglion, one in the anterior and another in the posterior part, both innervating the foot. The pleural ganglion is located posterior to the cerebral ganglion and connected to the latter and the pedal ganglion by short connectives forming the pre-pharyngeal nerve ring. The pleural ganglia are connected by very short connectives to the visceral nerve cord, so that the latter is located at the very beginning of the pharynx. There are three distinct ganglia on the short visceral nerve cord: the left parietal ganglion, the fused subintestinal/visceral ganglion and the fused right parietal/supraintestinal ganglion. While the left pleuro-parietal, the parietal-subintestinal/visceral and the right pleuro-parietal/supraintestinal connectives are very short, the subintestinal/visceral-parietal/supraintestinal connective is long. An additional presumed osphradial ganglion is linked to the fused parietal/supraintestinal ganglion. Anteriorly, a nerve emerges and innervates the right body wall; no histologically differentiated osphradium could be detected. The buccal ganglia are positioned posterior to the pharynx and are linked to each other by a short buccal commissure ventral to the oesophagus. The thin cerebro-buccal connective emerges anteriorly from each buccal ganglion and was not traceable along the entire length. A smaller gastro-oesophageal ganglion lies dorsally to each buccal ganglion and is connected to the latter by a short connective.

=== Digestive system ===
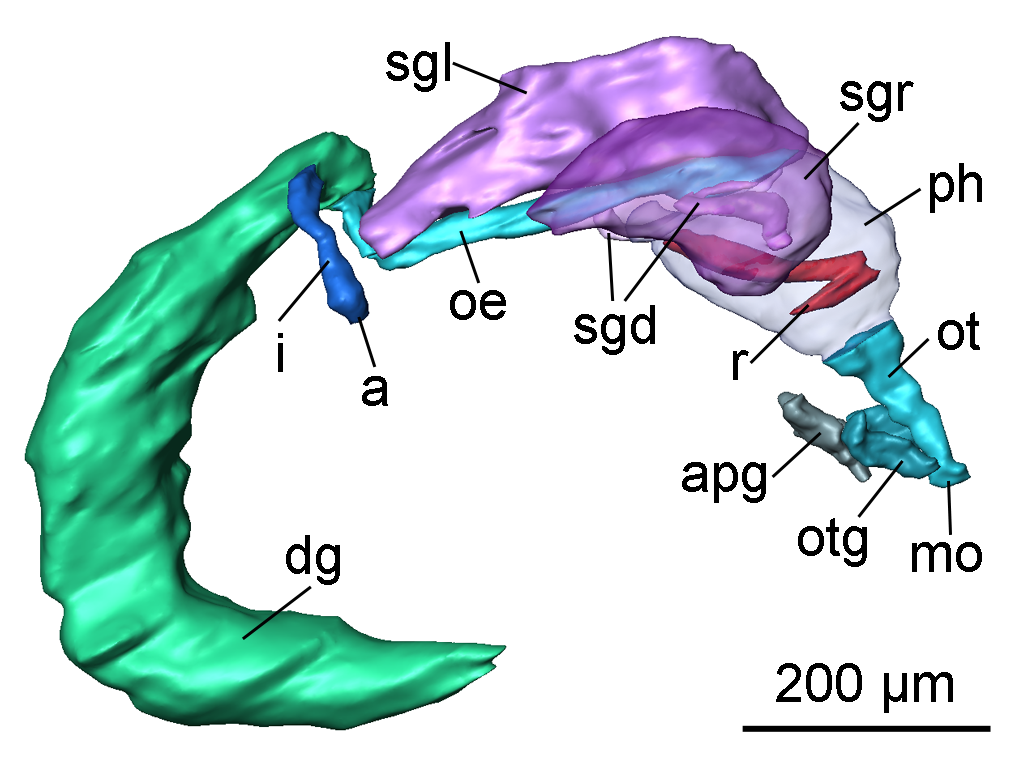
3D reconstruction of the digestive system of Pseudunela cornuta shows for example: mouth (mo), pharynx (ph), salivary glands (sgd, sgr, sgl) and digestive gland (dg, hepatopancreas).

Digestive system: The mouth opening lies ventrally between the labial tentacles. The paired anterior pedal glands discharge ventral to the mouth opening to the exterior. The oral tube is long and not ciliated. Paired oral tube glands are flanking the oral tube and discharge in its anterior part. The muscular pharynx is bulbous and narrows to the posterior; it contains the hook-shaped radula. The upper ramus is longer than the lower one. The radula formula could not be examined. Jaws are absent. The long, ciliated oesophagus emerges posterodorsally from the pharynx and is flanked by longitudinal muscles. One pair of large salivary glands discharges into the oesophagus via narrow salivary gland ducts directly behind the pharynx.

The large, sac-like digestive gland is placed at the left side of the visceral hump flanking the ovotestis and extends almost up to the end of the visceral hump. The intestine is densely ciliated and short. The anus opens slightly anterior, but separate to the nephropore and ventrolaterally on the right side of the visceral hump.

=== Excretory and circulatory systems ===
The excretory and circulatory systems are located at the right side of the body just at the beginning of the visceral hump.

The circulatory system shows a large two-chambered heart consisting of an anterior ventricle and a smaller, posterior atrium. The thin-walled pericardium surrounding the heart could not be detected because of the very compressed tissue. The aorta arises anteriorly from the ventricle and leads to the head, where the aorta bifurcates approximately at the level of the eyes ending in blood sinuses. The renopericardioduct is a well-developed and heavily ciliated funnel. The kidney is a sinuously bent sac and extends over almost the half of the visceral hump. Internally it is divided into a narrow lumen bordered by tissue with small vacuoles, and a wide lumen limited by highly vacuolated tissue. Both lumina join in the posterior part of the kidney. The renopericardial duct is connected to the narrow lumen in the anterior part of the kidney. The connection between the kidney and the nephroduct is narrow and ciliated. The nephroduct is long and looped with a dorsal branch extending backward and a ventral branch forward. The ventral branch is looped dorsally in its distal part. The nephropore opens just posterior, but separate to the anus and ventrolaterally on the right side of the visceral hump.

=== Reproductive system ===
The reproductive system of Pseudunela cornuta is simultaneous hermaphroditic. The anterior genitalia show a special androdiaulic condition: the vas deferens does not branch off in a proximal position as usual in androdiaulic nudibranch or acteonoidean species, but more distally, i.e. autosperm must pass through the nidamental glands. Nevertheless, this reproductive system is not strictly monaulic, because the internal vas deferens (for autosperm) is separated from the distal portion of the oviduct.

The sac-like ovotestis extends over the half of the right side of the visceral hump and is not separated into follicles; oocytes are located more in the exterior part of the gonad and the spermatocytes are positioned more in the centre. Sperm heads are short. Approximately 10 yolky oocytes were noted in the examined specimen. Anterior to the ovotestis there is a small receptaculum seminis containing sperm cells oriented with their heads to the wall, as well as a sac-like ampulla filled with unoriented autosperm. Three nidamental glands can be distinguished: the albumen, membrane and mucous gland from proximal to distal, respectively. The tube-like albumen gland is characterized by cells containing dark blue stained vesicles and long cilia. The membrane gland is tube-like with long cilia as well. In the proximal part, vesicles are stained purple, in the distal part, lilac. The mucous gland is sac-like with short cilia. It shows the same histological staining properties as the distal membrane gland. The distal part of the mucous gland extends to the right side of the body wall where the hermaphroditic duct divides into the vas deferens and the oviduct. The oviduct widens to a cavity. At the distal end of the cavity a long, narrowly coiled bursa stalk branches off leading to the large bursa copulatrix. No spermatocytes can be detected inside the bursa, but an indeterminable mucous mass that might contain degenerated sperm. The distal oviduct extends to the female gonopore opening ventrolaterally on the right side of the visceral hump to the exterior. The female gonopore is situated considerably anterior to the anus and the nephropore.

The internal, subepidermal vas deferens extends along the right body side to the right rhinophore connecting to the anterior male copulatory organs. The short posterior-leading vas deferens joins the large, tubular prostate gland. Anteriorly, the long and highly coiled, muscular ejaculatory duct arises from the prostate. The ejaculatory duct enters the muscular penis at its base and discharges at the top of the penis through a long hollow stylet. The penial stylet is about 600 μm long and corkscrew-like coiled with one and a half spirals. This stylet can be partly retracted into the penial muscle that is able to evert to a certain extent. The blind ending glandular paraprostate is longer and thinner than the prostate, and in contrast to the latter, highly coiled. It is connected by the paraprostatic duct to the muscular basal finger, which is united to the penial muscle mass at its base. The paraprostatic duct enters the basal finger approximately in the middle of the muscle and opens terminally via a hollow curved stylet of about 110 μm length. The penis, the basal finger and parts of the ejaculatory and paraprostatic ducts are surrounded by a thin-walled penial sheath. The latter, together with the copulatory organs, probably can be protruded through the male gonopore just at the base of the right rhinophore during the sperm transfer. However, sperm transfer has never been observed in living specimens.

== Ecology ==
Pseudunela cornuta is a minute species that lives in the spaces between sand grains in saltwater habitats, and it is thus considered to be a mesopsammic (), marine interstitial animal that is part of the meiofauna of marine sands.
