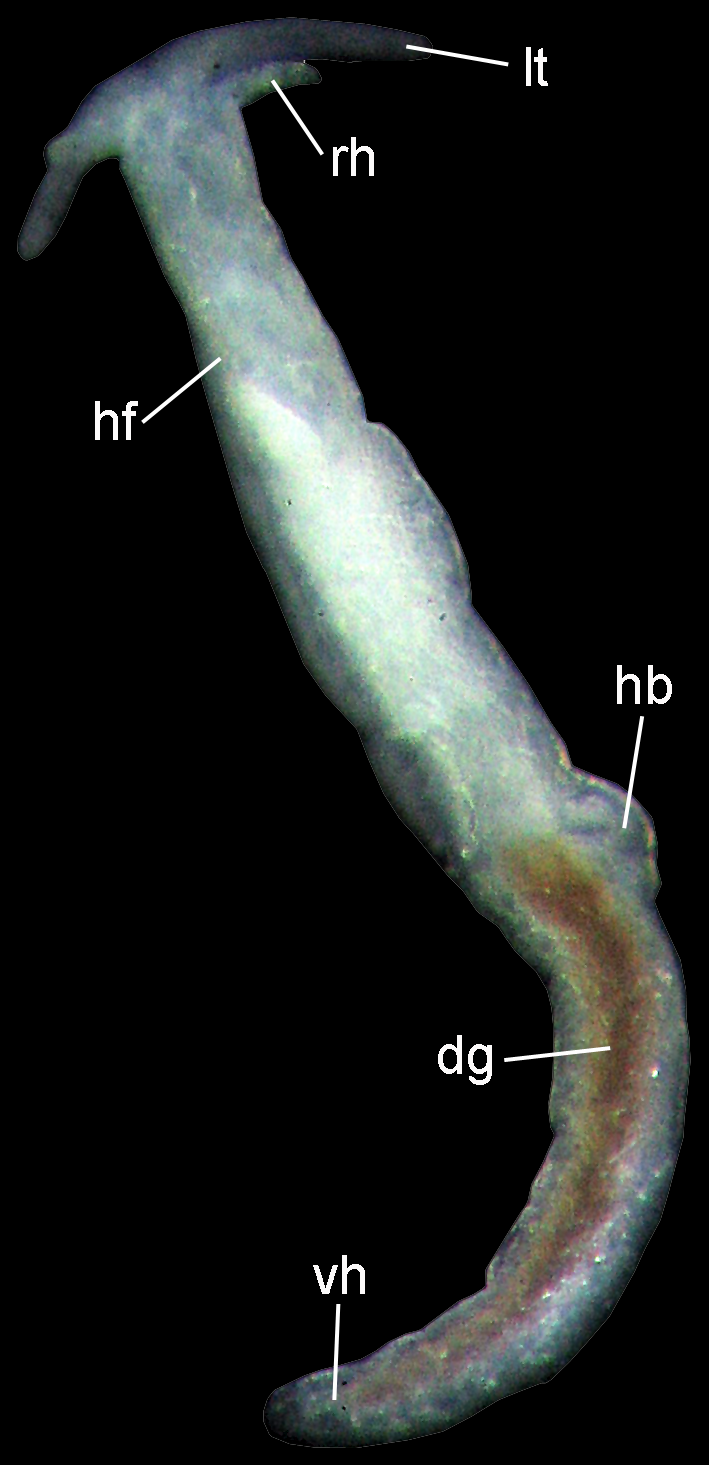
- A live Pseudunela viatoris hf – head-foot complex.

Scientific classification
- Kingdom: Animalia
- Phylum: Mollusca
- Class: Gastropoda
- Family: Pseudunelidae
- Genus: Pseudunela
- Species: P. viatoris

Binomial name
- Pseudunela viatoris Neusser, Jörger & Schrödl, 2011

= Pseudunela viatoris =

Species of gastropod

Pseudunela viatoris is a species of sea slug, an acochlidian, a shell-less marine gastropod mollusc in the family Pseudunelidae.

The specific name viatoris is after the Latin word “viator” (engl. pilgrim/voyager) according to its supposed ability to travel over long distances.

== Distribution ==
Pseudunela viatoris is known from Viti Levu, Fiji and Gili Lawa Laut, Indonesia. The type locality is Fiji, Viti Levu, Laucala Bay, Nukumbutho Island, GPS: 18°10.47′S, 178°28.34′E.

== Description ==
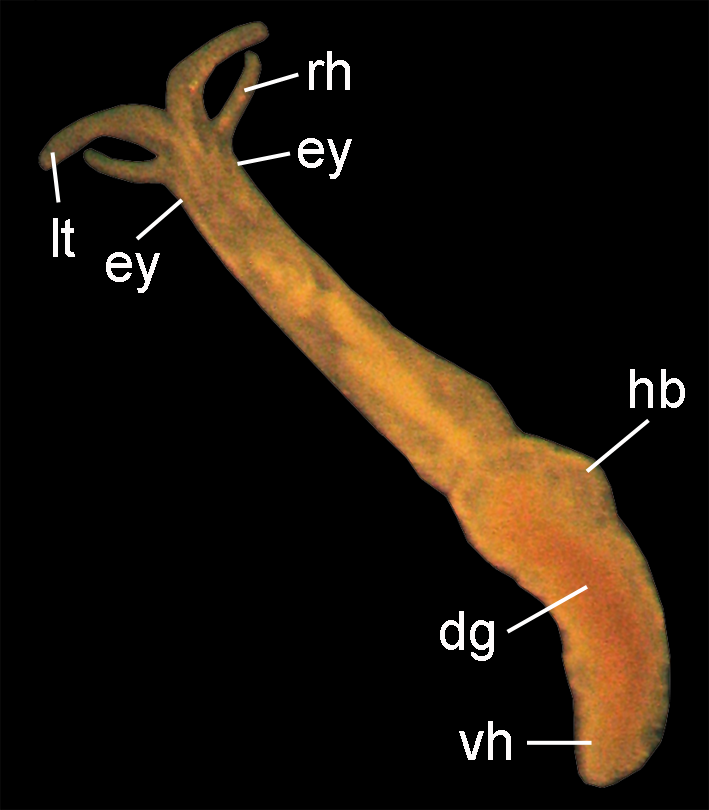
Photo of a dorsal view of a live Pseudunela viatoris. Body size is 3 mm. lt – labial tentacle, rh – rhinophore, ey – eye, hb – heart bulb, dg – digestive gland, vh – visceral hump.

The body size of living specimens of Pseudunela viatoris is 3–4 mm. The body is divided into an anterior head-foot complex and a posterior elongated visceral hump. The paired labial tentacles are broad at the base and taper to the end. The rhinophores are tapered and shorter and thinner than the labial tentacles. The densely ciliated foot is as broad as the anterior head-foot complex and extends about one third of the elongated visceral hump. The heart bulb is visible externally in the anterior part of the visceral hump on the right body side. Subepidermal, needle-shaped calcareous spicules are sparsely distributed in the cephalic tentacles, the foot and the visceral hump; in the anterior part of the latter they are larger than in the posterior part. The body colour is whitish translucent, the digestive gland is brownish coloured (in specimens from Indonesia: orange-brownish shining through the epidermis). Epidermal glands are distributed particularly over the visceral hump. Whereas eyes are not visible externally in specimens from Fiji, eyes are weakly visible in some specimens from Indonesia. Eye diameter is 30-35 μm.

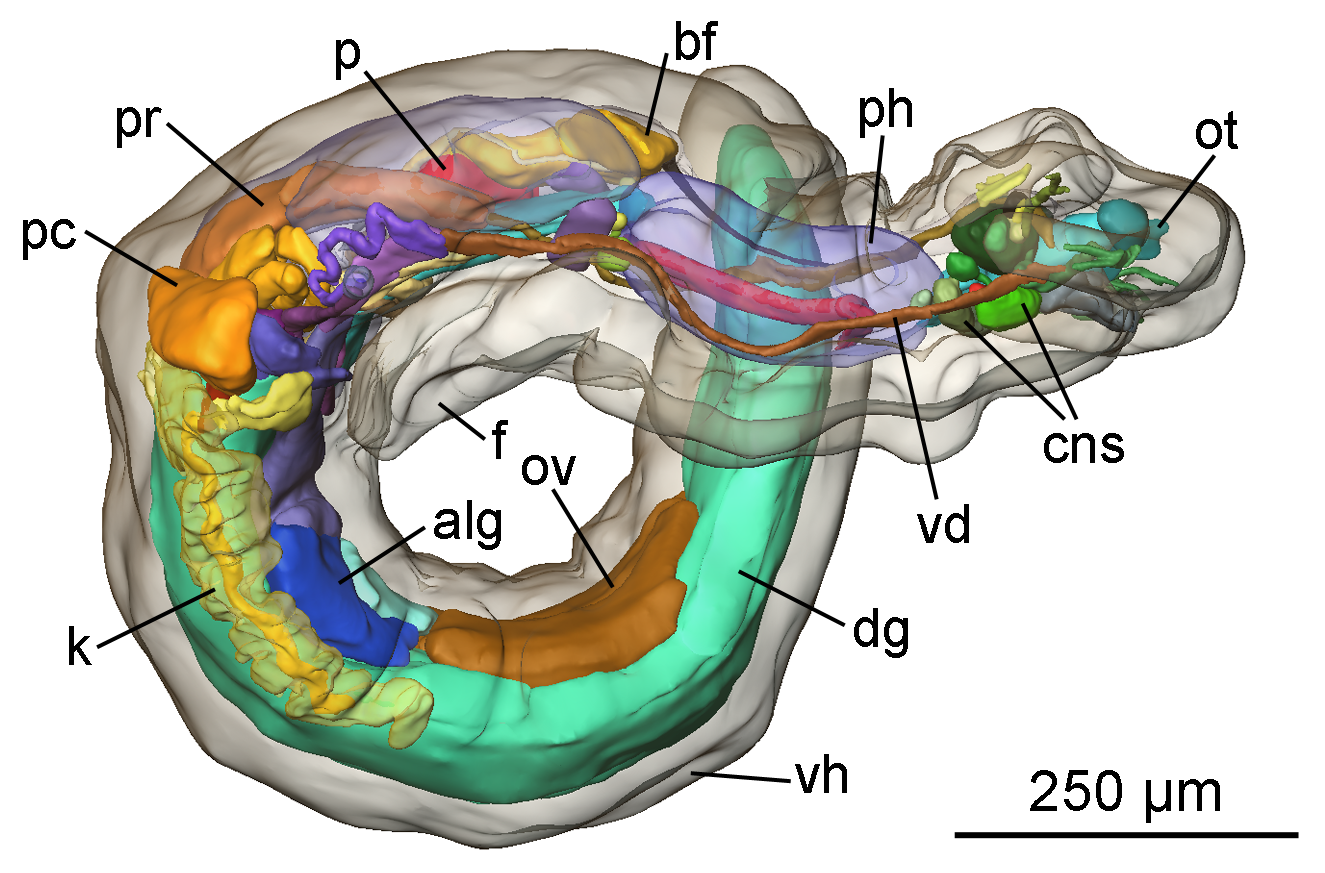
3D reconstruction of the general anatomy of the right side view of Pseudunela viatoris. ot – oral tube, cns – central nervous system, ph – pharynx, vd – vas deferens, bf – basal finger, p – penis, pr – prostate, pc – pericardium, f – foot, k – kidney, alg – albumen gland, ov – ovotestis, vh – visceral hump, dg – digestive gland.

Nervous system, digestive system, circulatory system, excretory system and reproductive system are described by Neusser et al. (2011) in detail.

== Ecology ==
Pseudunela viatoris is a minute species that lives in the spaces between sand grains in saltwater habitats, and it is thus considered to be a mesopsammic, marine interstitial animal that is part of the meiofauna of marine sands.
