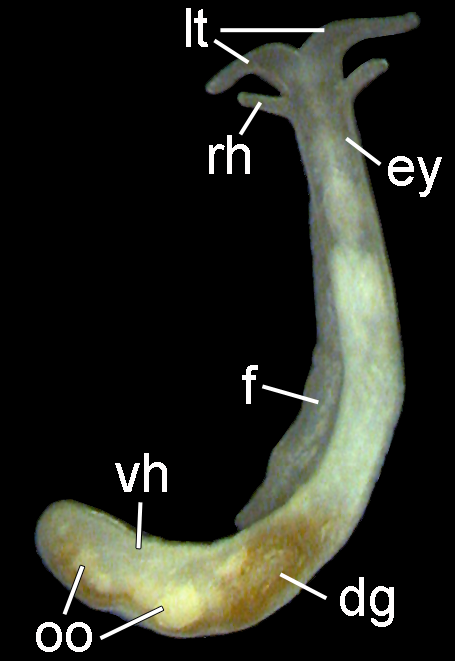
- A live Pseudunela marteli. dg - digestive gland, oo - oocyte.

Scientific classification
- Kingdom: Animalia
- Phylum: Mollusca
- Class: Gastropoda
- Family: Pseudunelidae
- Genus: Pseudunela
- Species: P. marteli

Binomial name
- Pseudunela marteli Neusser, Jörger & Schrödl, 2011

= Pseudunela marteli =

Species of mollusc

Pseudunela marteli is a species of sea slug, an acochlidian, a shell-less marine gastropod mollusc in the family Pseudunelidae.

The specific name marteli is in honour of author's "big-hearted friend and colleague" biologist Martin “Martl” Heß from LMU Munich, because the species has a large heart-bulb.

== Distribution ==
Pseudunela marteli is known from Guadalcanal, Solomon Islands, and Oyster Island, Vanuatu. The type locality is beach of “Art Gallery”, Honiara, Guadalcanal, Solomon Islands.

== Description ==
External morphology and anatomy of Pseudunela marteli is the same as in Pseudunela viatoris with the following exceptions: Colour of digestive gland is greenish or orange-brownish. Eyes (30–35 μm) are pigmented and well visible externally. Foot length is up to half of the visceral hump. Subepidermal spicules are more abundant in cephalic tentacles, foot and visceral hump.

digestive system: the radula formula is 57–59×1.1.?; rhachidian tooth with 3–4 denticles per side.

reproductive system: the hollow curved penial stylet measures 130 μm in length, the stylet of basal finger is 30 μm long. The ampulla is sac-like; allosperm receptacles are absent in the examined specimen. The albumen and mucous glands are tubular; the membrane gland is sac-like.

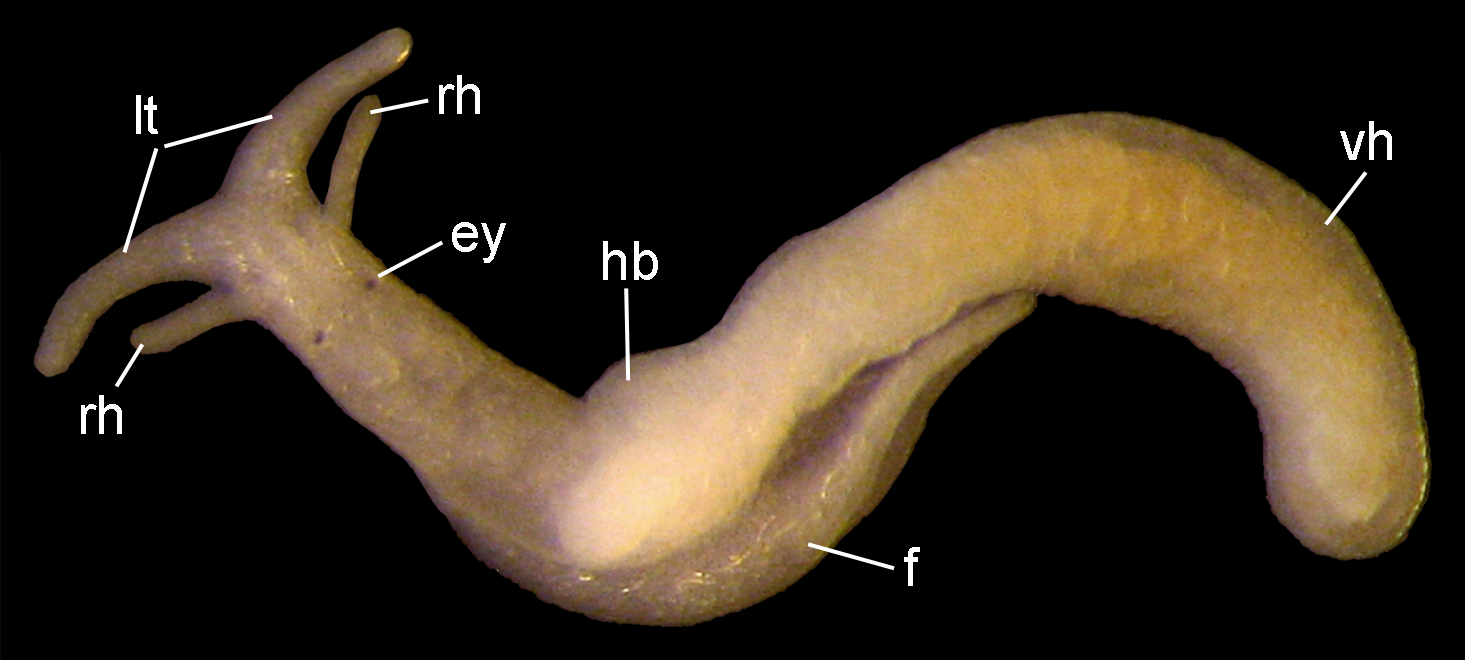
Photo of a dorsal view of a live Pseudunela marteli. Body size is 3 mm. lt – labial tentacle, rh – rhinophore, ey – eye, hb – heart bulb, f – foot, vh – visceral hump.

== Ecology ==
Pseudunela marteli is a minute species that lives in the spaces between sand grains in saltwater habitats, and it is thus considered to be a mesopsammic, marine interstitial animal that is part of the meiofauna of marine sands.
