= Aiteng =

Scientific classification
- Kingdom: Animalia
- Phylum: Mollusca
- Class: Gastropoda
- Subclass: Heterobranchia
- Infraclass: Euthyneura
- Subterclass: Tectipleura
- Superorder: Acochlidiimorpha
- Superfamily: Acochlidioidea
- Family: Aitengidae; Swennen & Buatip, 2009
- Genus: Aiteng; Swennen & Buatip, 2009

Genus of gastropods

Aiteng is a genus comprising three species of sea slug, A. ater and A. mysticus being found in intertidal zones while A. marefugitus is fully terrestrial. Aiteng is the only genus in the family Aitengidae. The generic name Aiteng is derived from the name of a black puppet Ai Theng, which is one of the shadow play (Nang yai) puppets in southern Thailand.

== Taxonomy ==
Swennen & Buatip (2009) tentatively classified Aitengidae within the Sacoglossa, but they noted that some characteristics of the nervous system are similar to those of the Cephalaspidea and Acochlidioidea (mentioned as Acochlidea).

Aitengidae clusters within the Hedylopsacea as sister group to Pseudunelidae and Acochlidiidae or basal within Hedylopsacea. Philippe Bouchet (2010) classified Aitengidae within the superfamily Hedylopsoidea.

== Species ==
Species in the genus Aiteng include:

- Aiteng ater Swennen & Buatip, 2009
- Aiteng mysticus Neusser, Fukuda, Jörger, Kano & Schrödl, 2011 – This species was found in Hisamatsu, Miyako Island, Okinawa, Japan. Morphologically it clearly belongs to the Aitengidae, but shows differences to Aiteng ater at genus or species level. Its affinity to Aiteng ater is confirmed by comparison of the mitochondrial 16S rRNA sequences.
- Aiteng marefugitus Kano, Neusser, Fukumori, Jörger & Schrödl, 2015 - species of sea slug that, remarkably, became terrestrial during the Cenozoic.

== Distribution ==
The distribution of Aiteng ater includes Thailand. The distribution of Aiteng mysticus includes Japan. The distribution of Aiteng marefugitus includes Palau.

== Ecology ==
Aiteng ater lives "amphibiously" in mangrove forests in the intertidal zone, on the mud.
