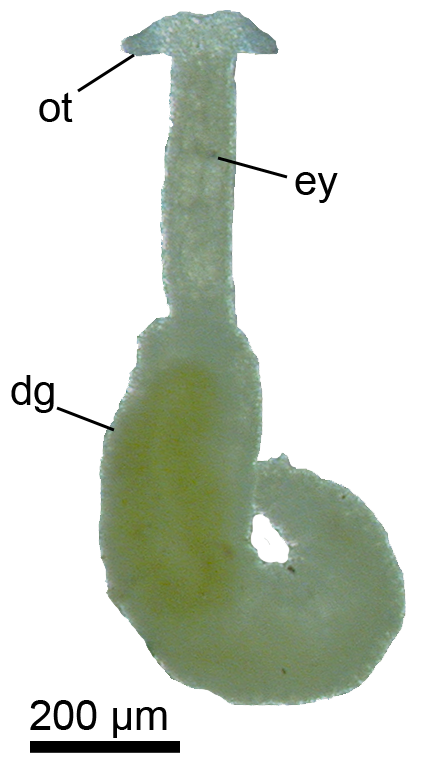
- A live Pontohedyle milaschewitchii ot = oral tentacles, ey = eyes, dg = digestive gland.

Scientific classification
- Kingdom: Animalia
- Phylum: Mollusca
- Class: Gastropoda
- Family: Parhedylidae
- Genus: Pontohedyle
- Species: P. milaschewitchii

Binomial name
- Pontohedyle milaschewitchii (Kowalevsky, 1901)

Synonyms
- Hedyle milaschewitchii Kowalevsky, 1901

= Pontohedyle milaschewitchii =

Species of gastropod

Pontohedyle milaschewitchii is a species of sea slug, an acochlidian, a shell-less marine gastropod mollusk in the family Parhedylidae.

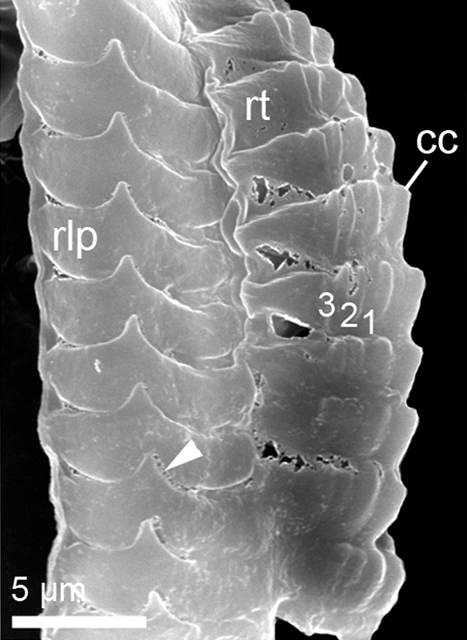
The radula of Pontohedyle milaschewitchii shows that the lateral radula tooth (rlp) is with a denticle (arrowhead).

== Ecology ==
The life cycle of all Acochlidiacea is not well known. Pontohedyle milaschewitchii lays a maximum of 40 eggs.
