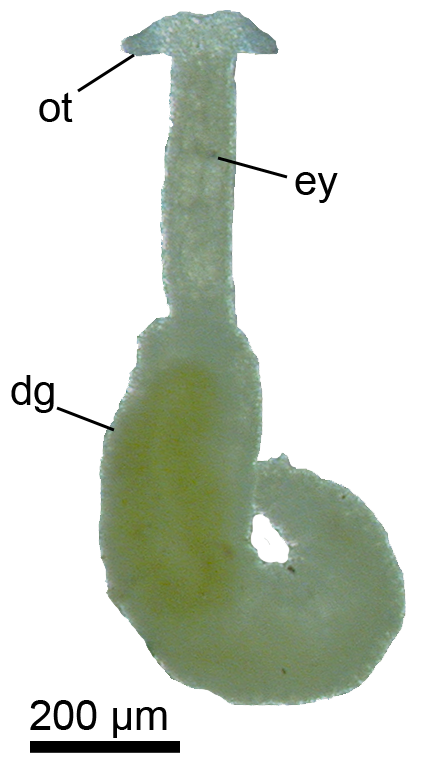
- live Pontohedyle milaschewitchii ot = oral tentacles, ey = eyes, dg = digestive gland.

Scientific classification
- Kingdom: Animalia
- Phylum: Mollusca
- Class: Gastropoda
- Family: Parhedylidae
- Genus: Pontohedyle; Golikov & Starobogatov, 1972

Diversity
- At least 12 cryptic species (3 valid, at least 9 undescribed)

Synonyms
- Gastrohedyle Rankin, 1979; Mancohedyle Salvini-Plawen, 1973; Maraunibina Rankin, 1979

= Pontohedyle =

Genus of gastropods

Pontohedyle is a genus of sea slugs, acochlidians, shell-less marine gastropod mollusks in the family Parhedylidae. Sea slugs in this genus are highly simplified and uniform.

== Distribution ==
The genus Pontohedyle shows a circumtropical distribution with a single derived species (Mediterranean/ Black Sea Pontohedyle milaschewitchii) inhabiting temperate waters. In the absence of a fossil record for meiofaunal slugs, the only available estimate for divergence times derives from a molecular clock approach, calibrated with shelled heterobranch fossils. Jörger et al. (2010) estimated the origin of the genus Pontohedyle to the late Cretaceous, 84 mya (95% confidence interval ranging from 160 to 60 mya), providing a rough estimation of how much time was available for diversification and circum-global dispersal of Pontohedyle slugs.

Pontohedyle has never been found in colder waters despite a well-studied meiofauna and hydrographic conditions similar to the Mediterranean. The distribution of Pontohedyle might be constrained by ancestry from warm-water adapted animals. Considering the estimated mid to late Mesozoic origin and the recent primarily tropical distribution pattern in Pontohedyle, it is most likely that this meiofaunal slug clade originated in Tethyan waters.

Map of Pontohedyle distribution.

== Description ==
With its vermiform body, a putatively multi-functional radula, ‘simplified’ organ systems and a special fast and imprecise mode of sperm transfer, Pontohedyle reflects a meiofaunal slug lineage highly adapted to its interstitial habitat.

Pontohedyle is morphologically well-defined genus of meiofaunal slugs. Specimens of Pontohedyle are externally uniform and easily distinguishable from other acochlids by the lack of rhinophores and the bow-shaped oral tentacles. Pontohedyle typically bear monaxone, rodlet-like spicules distributed randomly and frequently accumulated between the oral tentacles. No diagnostic differences in external morphology or spicules could be detected between the collected populations apart from eyes externally visible or not. Comparative SEM-examination of the available radulae revealed two types of the typically hook-shaped radula: a lateral tooth without a denticle (Pontohedyle verrucosa) or with a denticle (Pontohedyle milaschewitchii).

Pontohedyle slugs have a well-adapted body plan that can be conserved for millions of years in a worldwide evolutionary success story. Pontohedyle presents a stunning example of extreme morphological stasis and uniformity over long evolutionary timeframes, probably constrained by their simplified bodyplan and by the requirements of the meiofaunal habitat.

== Species ==
The first discovered Pontohedyle species is well described and abundant Pontohedyle milaschewitchii from the Black Sea and Mediterranean. The second discovered species is poorly known Western Pacific Pontohedyle verrucosa from the Solomon Islands. In absence of distinguishing morphological characters Jörger et al. (2007) synonymized the tropical Western Atlantic Pontohedyle brasilensis with its temperate congener Pontohedyle milaschewitchii. Subsequently (2012) authors tested molecular markers to detect possible cryptic species and they reestablished Pontohedyle brasilensis as a valid taxon and they uncovered at least nine (undescribed) candidate species.

There are at least nine candidate species plus three confirmed valid species:

- Pontohedyle brasilensis (Rankin, 1979) - tropical, East Atlantic, subtidal, lateral radula tooth with denticle, eyes are sometimes externally visible.
- Pontohedyle milaschewitchii (Kowalevsky, 1901) - temperate, Mediterranean and Black Sea, subtidal, lateral radula tooth with denticle, eyes externally visible.
- Pontohedyle verrucosa (Challis, 1970) - tropical, Central Indo-Pacific and West-Pacific, intertidal, lateral radula tooth without denticle, eyes are sometimes externally visible.
- Pontohedyle sp. 1 - tropical, Central Indo-Pacific, subtidal, lateral radula tooth without denticle, eyes externally visible.
- Pontohedyle sp. 2 - tropical, East Atlantic, subtidal, lateral radula tooth with denticle, eyes externally visible.
- Pontohedyle sp. 3 - tropical, Central-Pacific, subtidal, unknown radula, unknown eyes.
- Pontohedyle sp. 4 - tropical, Red Sea, subtidal, lateral radula tooth with denticle, eyes externally visible.
- Pontohedyle sp. 5 - tropical, Indian Ocean, subtidal, lateral radula tooth with denticle, eyes externally visible.
- Pontohedyle sp. 6 - tropical, Central Indo-Pacific and Central-Pacific and West-Pacific and Indian Ocean, subtidal, lateral radula tooth with denticle, eyes externally visible.
- Pontohedyle sp. 7 - tropical, West Atlantic, subtidal, lateral radula tooth with denticle, eyes not visible externally.
- Pontohedyle sp. 8 - tropical, Central-Pacific, subtidal, unknown radula, unknown eyes.
- Pontohedyle sp. 9 - tropical, East-Pacific, subtidal, unknown radula, eyes externally visible.

== Cladogram ==
A cladogram based on sequences of mitochondrial 28S ribosomal RNA, 16S ribosomal RNA and cytochrome-c oxidase I (COI) genes showing phylogenic relations of the genus Pontohedyle:

- Pontohedyle
  - - Pontohedyle sp. 1
    - - Pontohedyle sp. 2
      - - - Pontohedyle sp. 3
          - - Pontohedyle sp. 4
            - Pontohedyle sp. 5
        - Pontohedyle verrucosa
  - - - Pontohedyle sp. 7
      - Pontohedyle sp. 6
    - - Pontohedyle sp. 8
      - - - Pontohedyle sp. 9
          - Pontohedyle milaschewitchii
        - Pontohedyle brasilensis

== Ecology ==
Pontohedyle (and many other meiofauna taxa) are rare and can be expected to have small effective population sizes.
