= Buccal mass =

The buccal mass refers to the mouthparts of a number of animal groups, such as:

- Gastropods
- Cephalopods, which houses the cephalopod beak
