= Snail slime =

External bodily secretion produced by snails

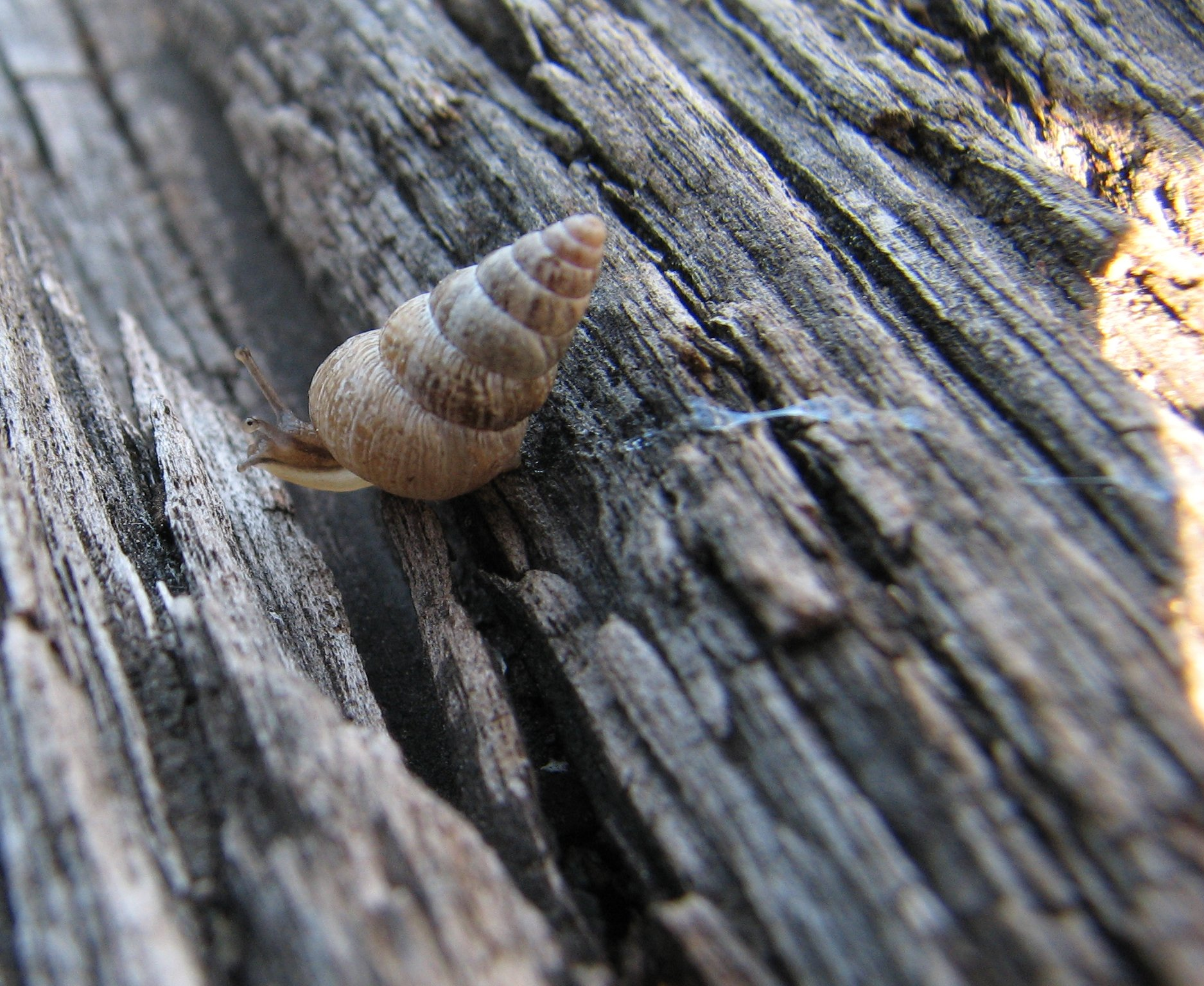
A crawling individual of the small land snail Cochlicella barbara leaving a slime trail behind it.

Snail slime is a kind of mucus (an external bodily secretion) produced by snails, which are gastropod mollusks. Land snails and slugs both produce mucus, as does every other kind of gastropod, from marine, freshwater, and terrestrial habitats. The reproductive system of gastropods also produces mucus internally from special glands.

Chemically, the mucus produced by land-living gastropodes belongs to the class of glycosaminoglycans (previously called mucopolysaccharides). Externally, one kind of mucus is produced by the foot of the gastropod and is usually used for crawling. The other kind of external mucus has evolved to coat the external parts of the gastropod's body; in land species, this coating helps prevent desiccation of the exposed soft tissues. The foot mucus of a gastropod has some of the qualities of glue and some of the qualities of a lubricant, allowing land snails to crawl up vertical surfaces without falling off.

The slime trail that a land gastropod leaves behind is often visible as a silvery track on surfaces such as stone or concrete.

== Description ==
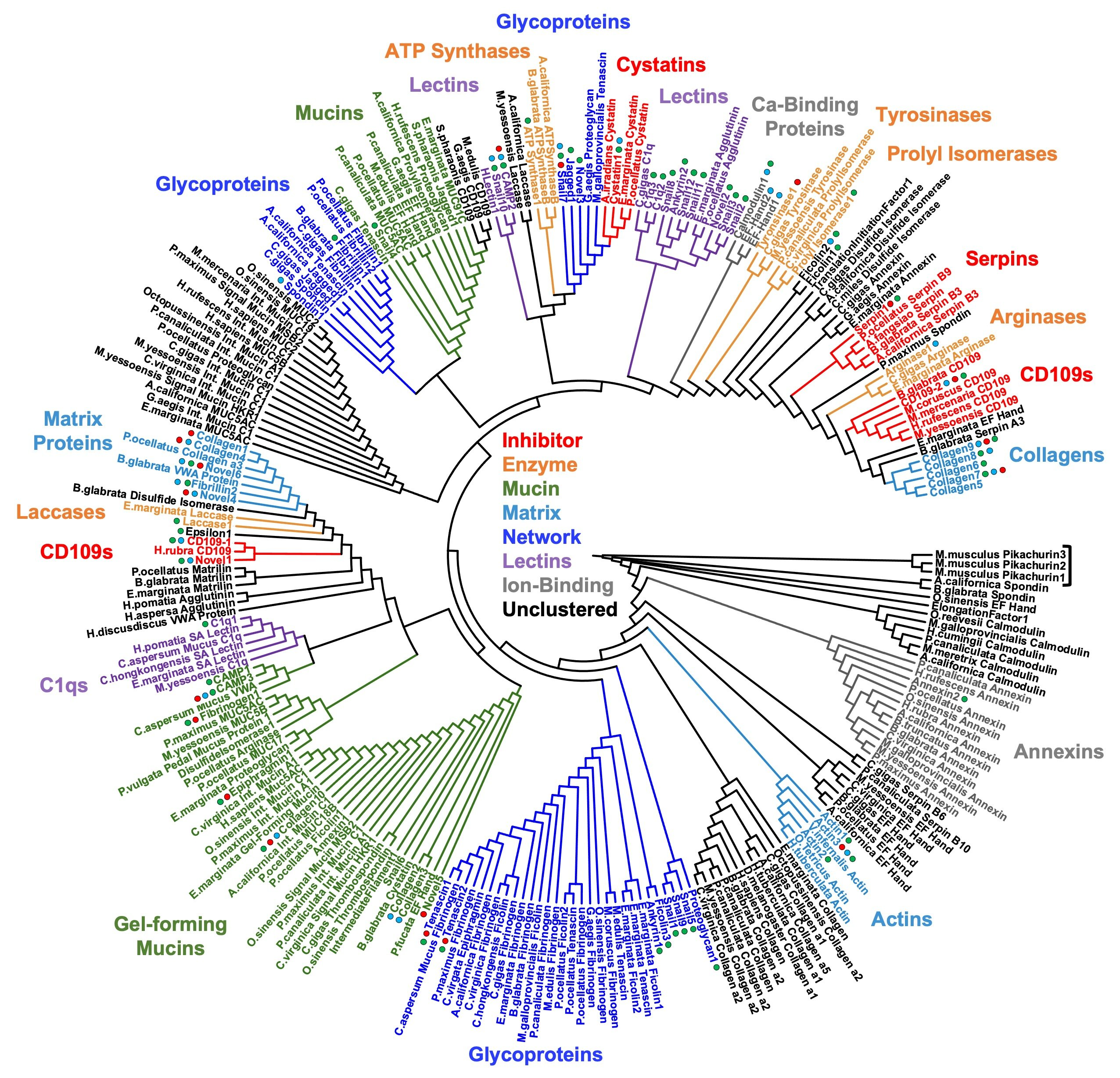
A dendrogram (tree) showing the genetic similarity of Cornu aspersum mucus between 71 proteins against ~180 related proteins that were found previously in other mollusks.

Mucus is a gel consisting of a polymer network that functions as a protective layer for the integument and mucosal surfaces of both elementary animals and mammals.

The mucus of gastropods is not only used as a coating to cover the surfaces on which the snail crawls and a coating to cover the exposed soft parts of the body but also sometimes to allow a resting snail to adhere passively to surfaces, such as rock. Gastropod mucus adhesion uses a temporary sealing structure called the epiphragm. Mucus is produced by a large gland located below the snail's mouth.

The foot of gastropods is covered with a thin layer of this mucus, which is used for a variety of functions, including locomotion, adherence, lubrication, repulsing predators, recognizing other snails, following a trail to a known destination and during reproduction. The discharge looks like a gel and it contains approximately 91 to 98% water by weight, depending on the species, combined with a small amount of high molecular weight glycoproteins. In Cornu aspersum, these glycoproteins reach weights of 82, 97 and 175 kDa.

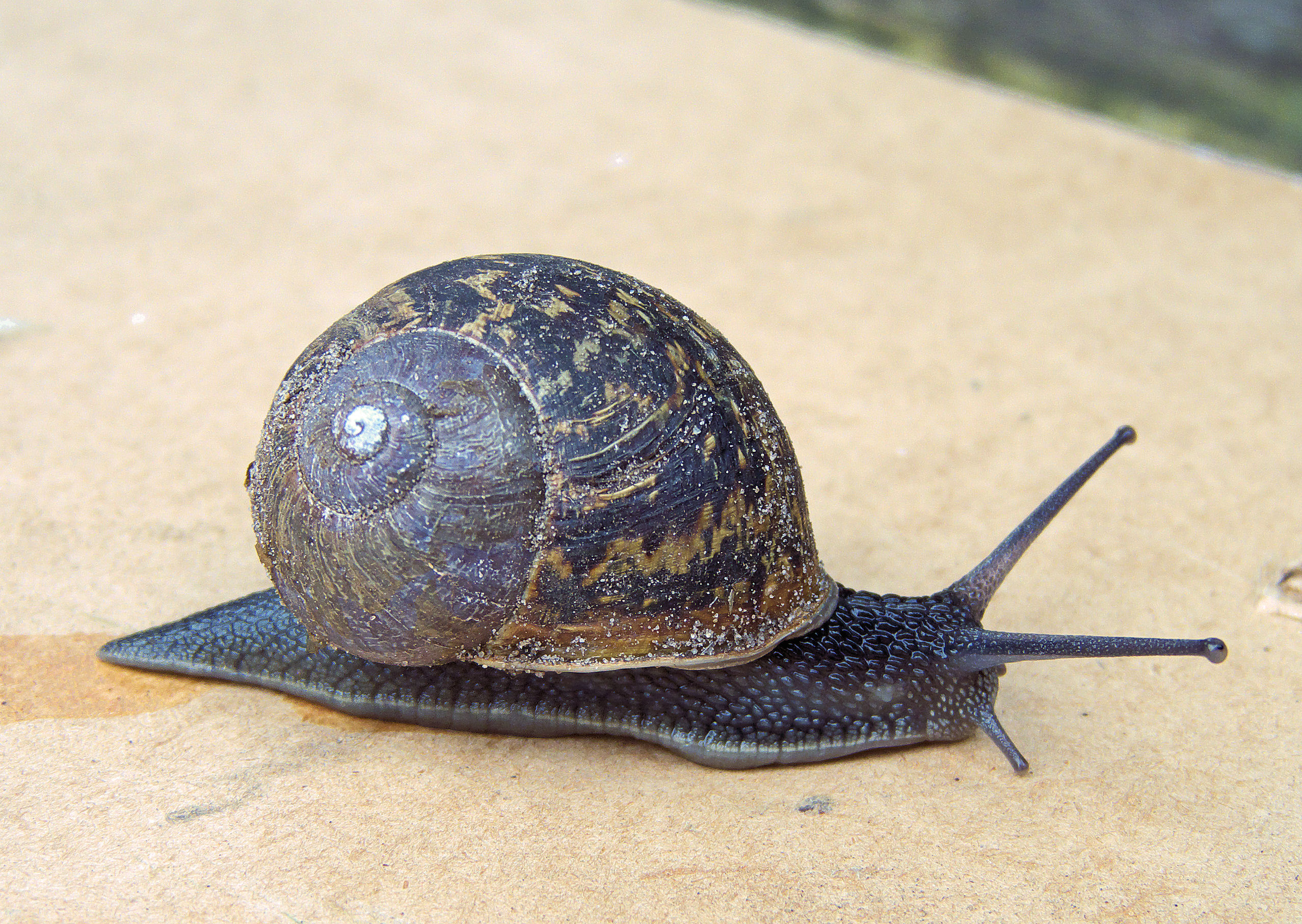
The common garden snail Cornu aspersum

== Locomotion ==
Locomotion in snails comes from a series of muscle contractions called pedal waves and relaxations called inter waves. The waves created help propel the snail forward whilst pushing the thin layer of mucus used as lubrication, behind them. Each wave is indeed creating a propulsive force using the mucus to reduce resistance.

Land mollusks travel by adhesive locomotion via muscular waves that propagate from tail to head. The snail mucus has an adapted flow behavior that allows transmittance of the muscular force while maintaining adhesion. When inactive, many mollusks of both marine and terrestrial species, use the secretion to stick to various surfaces. However, although it is so diluted that it can commonly act as a lubricant, it can also have strong adhesive properties. In their unique mating ritual, Limax maximus use a mucus thread to suspend themselves from elevated locations like tree branches. In Cornu aspersum, there are three types of secretion. One type is translucent and not adhesive, the kind that the snail leaves behind as it moves (the slime trail), another is similar but thicker, condensed, more viscous and elastic, which is used to adhere to various surfaces, and a third viscous coating on the dorsal surface that is a protective barrier. Both are clearly differentiated by the type of proteins present in them.

== Slime production ==
A snail releases different kinds of mucus depending on the way it is stimulated. When the stimulation is normal, the slime is viscous (sticky) but if the snail is disturbed continuously or even violently, it releases clear foamy secretions. If the snail is sexually aroused the slime it releases is clear and viscous. In the case of Cornu aspersum, the discharge is composed of synthesized products from various types of secretory glands. These are all single-cell glands found in connective tissue and they secrete their products via pores that pass between the epidermal cells. They are of various shapes and usually have a long excretory duct. There are eight different types of secreting glands. Four of these different types secrete protein, calcium, pigments and lipids.

== Medical uses ==
Some of the characteristics of snail slime have shown to be useful in Chinese medicine. Traditional Chinese medicine has used slime in a variety of ways to treat a variety of illnesses and cosmetic issues. It has also been used as skin creams for wrinkles and dry skin in cosmetics. The Chinese also have used the color-fast dry qualities of snail slime as a natural dye that represented wealth and power. The mucus has demonstrated several biological activities including antimicrobial, antioxidant, anti-tyrosinase, and anti-tumoral activities.

A new generation of tissue adhesive has been developed by using natural adhesion phenomena and mechanisms, such as snail mucus gel, which exhibits excellent haemostatic activity, biocompatibility, and biodegradability. It is effective in accelerating the healing of full-thickness skin wounds in both normal and diabetic male rats.

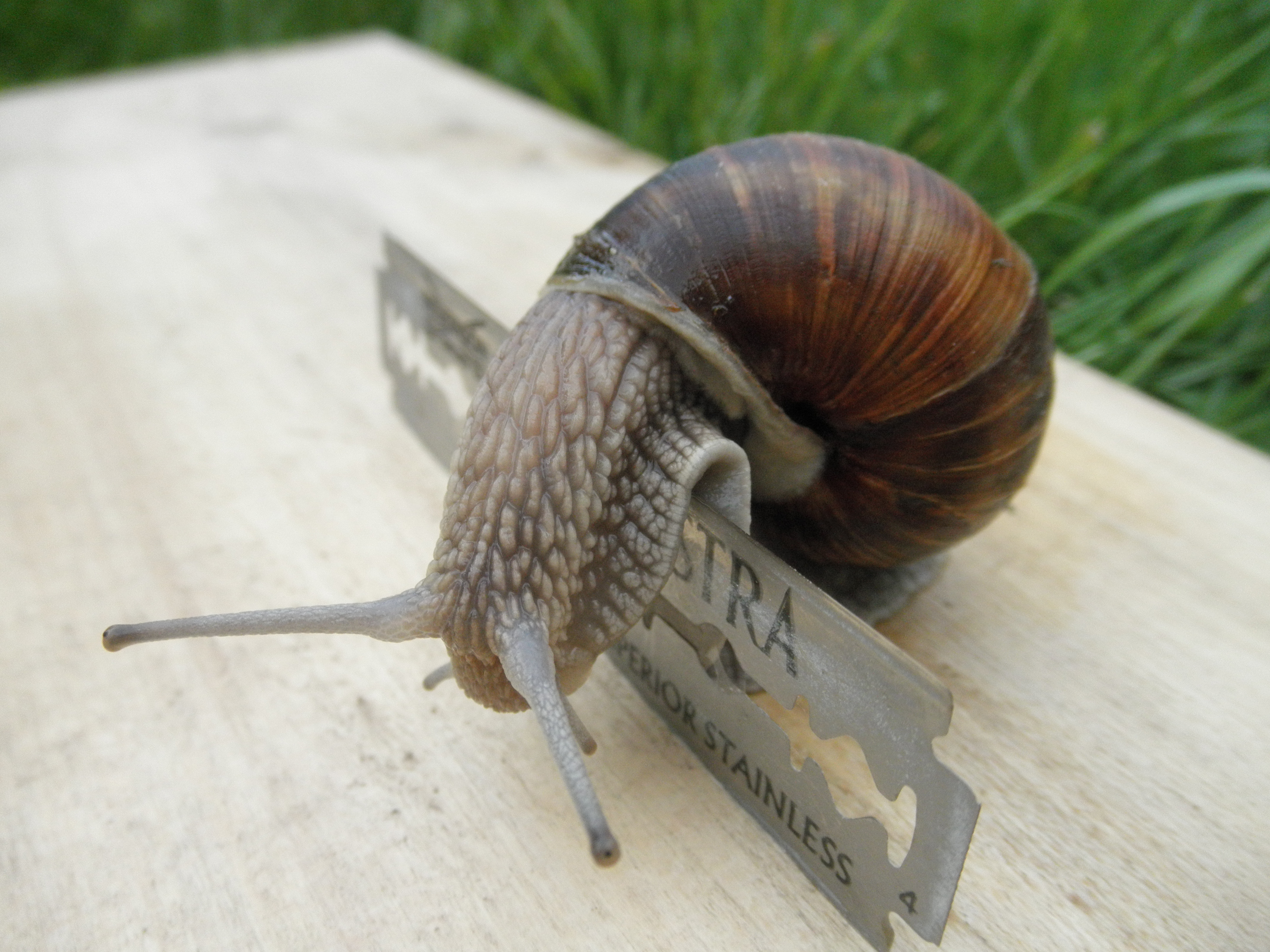
The slime trail is so thick that the animal is able to cross a sharp blade without harm.

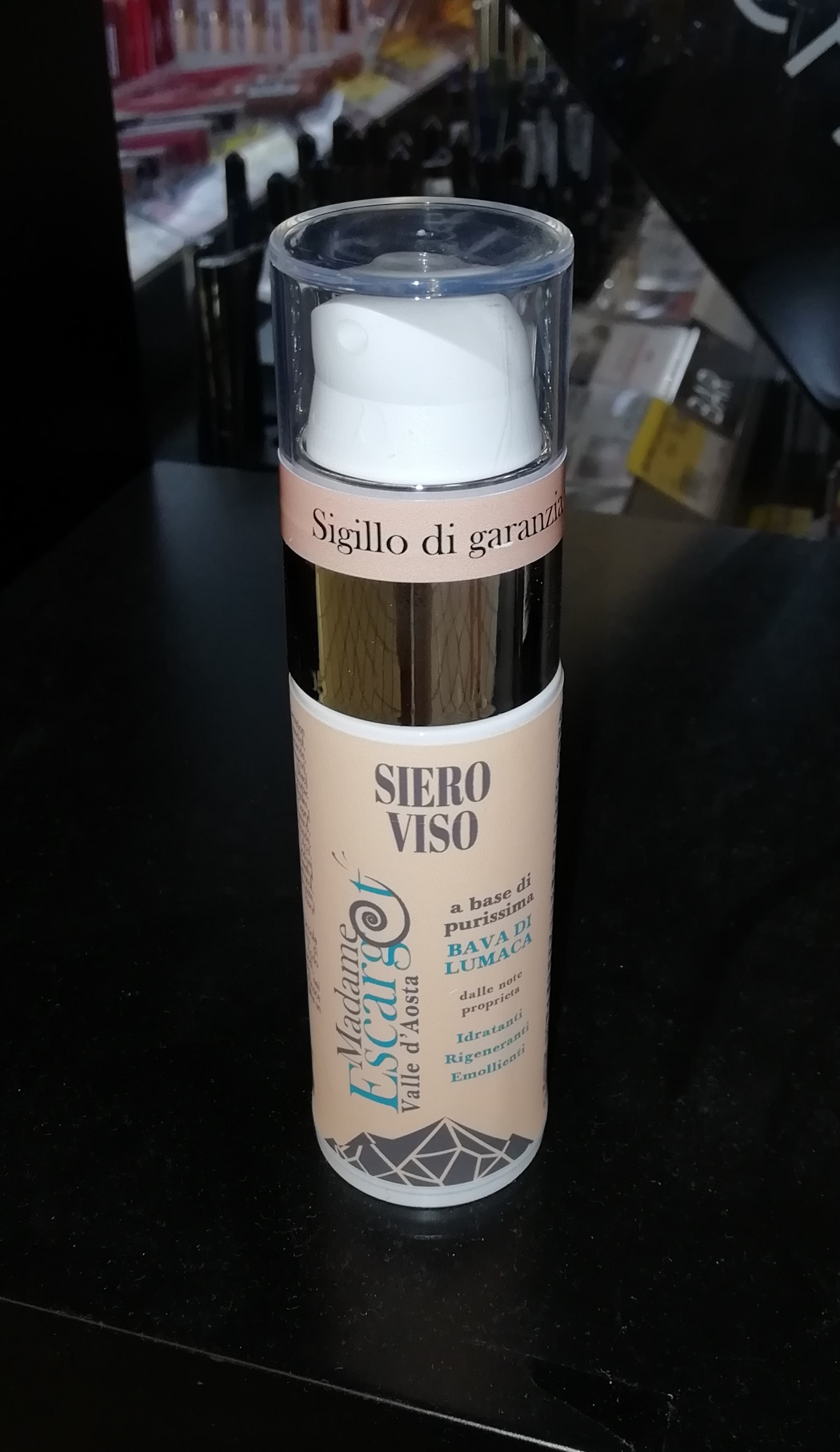
Snail slime cosmetic as sold in Italy.

== See also ==
- Heliciculture – Snail farming
- Mucus – Secretion produced by mucous membranes
- Suprapedal gland – Gland located inside the front end of the foot of gastropods
- Nanofiber – Natural or synthetic fibers with diameters in the nanometer range
- Lissachatina fulica – Species of land snail
- Rheology – Study of the flow of matter, primarily in a fluid state
