= Aiteng mysticus =

Scientific classification
- Kingdom: Animalia
- Phylum: Mollusca
- Class: Gastropoda
- Family: Aitengidae
- Genus: Aiteng
- Species: A. mysticus

Binomial name
- Aiteng mysticus Neusser et al., 2011

Species of gastropod

Aiteng mysticus is a species of sea slug in the family Aitengidae, found around Hisamatsu, Miyako-jima, Okinawa, Japan. Morphologically it clearly belongs to the Aitengidae, but it shows differences to Aiteng ater at genus or species level. Its affinity to Aiteng ater is confirmed by comparison of the mitochondrial 16S rRNA sequences.
