= Pseudunela espiritusanta =

Scientific classification
- Kingdom: Animalia
- Phylum: Mollusca
- Class: Gastropoda
- Family: Pseudunelidae
- Genus: Pseudunela
- Species: P. espiritusanta

Binomial name
- Pseudunela espiritusanta Neusser & Schrödl, 2009

Species of gastropod

Pseudunela espiritusanta is a species of sea slug, an acochlidian, a shell-less marine gastropod mollusk in the family Pseudunelidae.

Its specific name is a reference to Espiritu Santo Island in Vanuatu, where it was found.

This species, from Espiritu Santo Island in Vanuatu, lives in brackish water. The other two species in the genus Pseudunela are fully marine.
