= Hancock's organ =

Sensory organ of gastropods

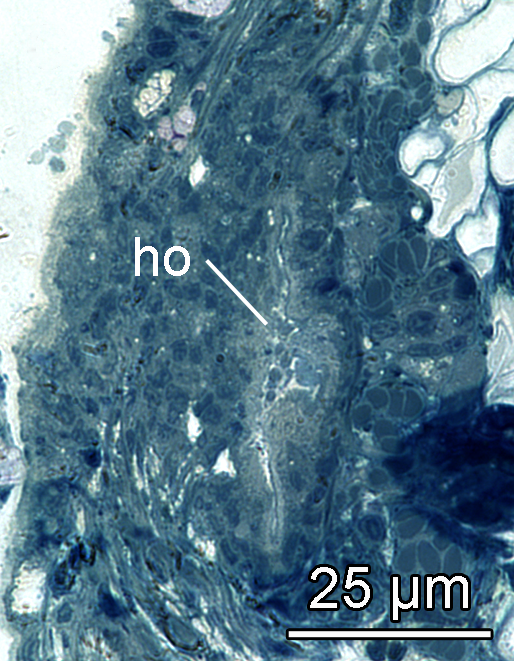
A microphoto of Hancock's organ (ho) of a sea slug Pseudunela marteli.

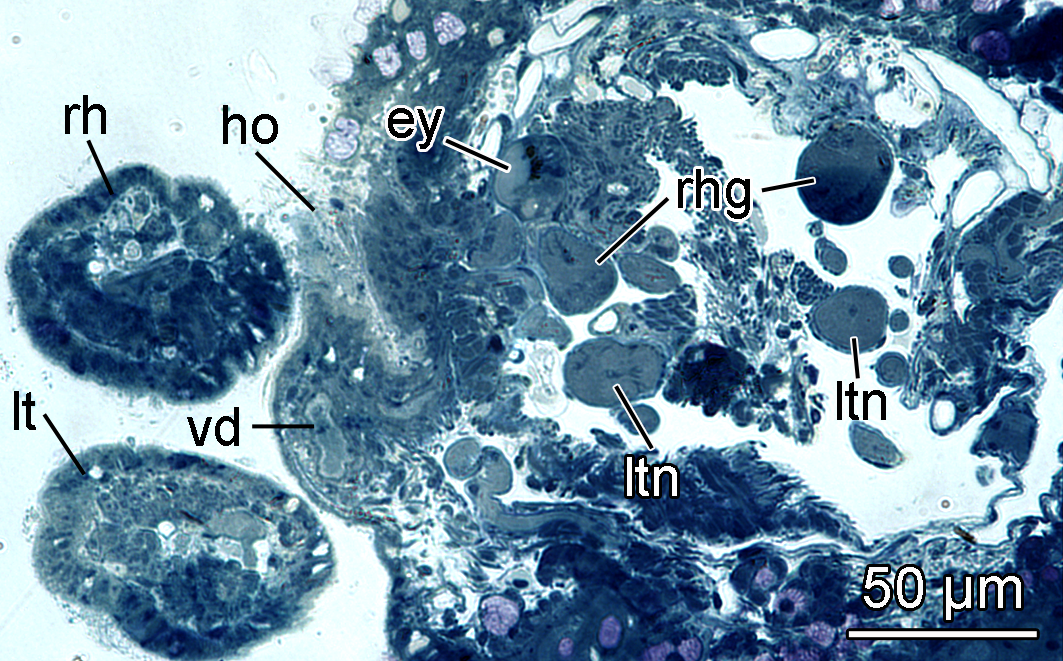
A microphoto of head region of Pseudunela marteli shows position of Hancock's organ (ho) near eye (ey) and rhinophore (rh).

Hancock's organ is a lateral concealed sensory organ of gastropods, a chemo-sensory sense organ found in some sea snails. This organ is found in most of the shelled opisthobranchs.

A great majority of the bubble shells and sea slugs of the orders Acteonoidea and Cephalaspidea have Hancock’s organs.
