= Suprapedal gland =

Gland located inside the front end of the foot of gastropods

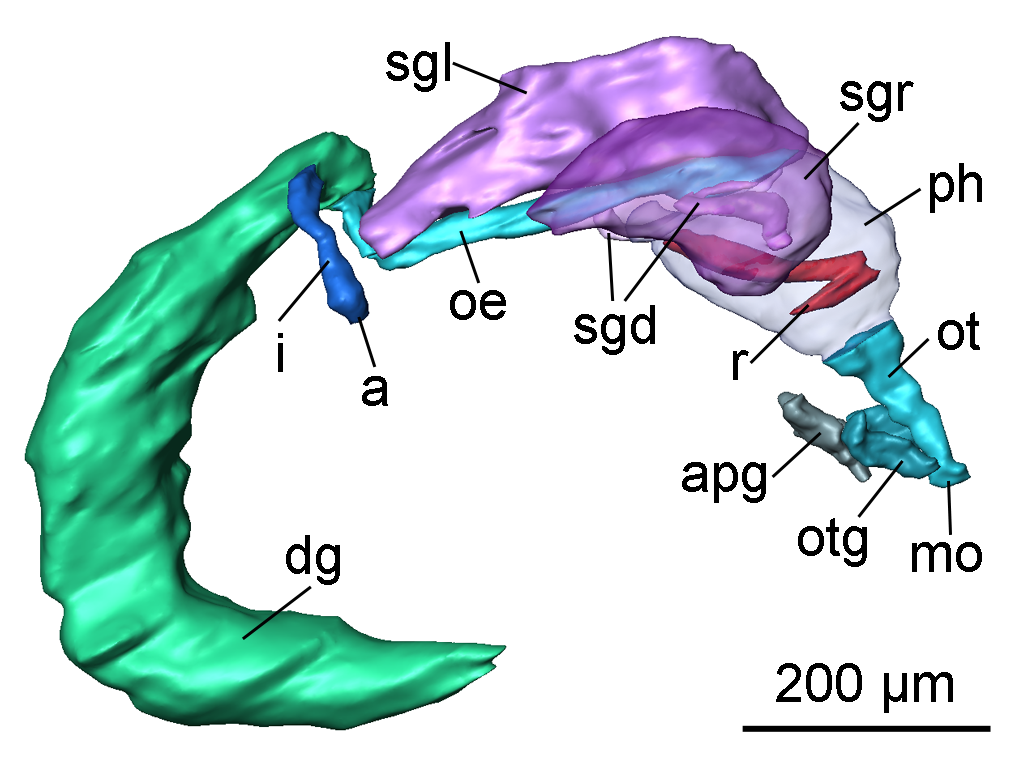
Anterior pedal gland (apg) is shown next to the oral tube gland (otg) and mouth (mo) of the 3D model of the digestive system of Pseudunela cornuta.

The suprapedal gland or mucous pedal gland is an anatomical feature found in some snails and slugs. It is a gland located inside the front end of the foot of gastropods.

The term suprapedal means "above the foot".

The function of this gland is to produce mucus. The gland opens on the front end of the sole, on the ventral side of the foot. The mucus produced by this gland becomes a thin layer covering the sole of the foot, and this helps the gastropod in moving.

There are gland cells in the suprapedal gland. For example, in the suprapedal gland of the land snail Pomatias elegans there are three types of gland cells: cells producing mucoproteins, cells producing proteins and cells producing sulphated mucopolysaccharides. For example, the land slug Leidyula floridana has gland cells in the suprapedal gland which produce weakly acidic mucopolysaccharides, neutral mucopolysaccharides and a protein.
