= Aiteng marefugitus =

Scientific classification
- Kingdom: Animalia
- Phylum: Mollusca
- Class: Gastropoda
- Family: Aitengidae
- Genus: Aiteng
- Species: A. marefugitus

Binomial name
- Aiteng marefugitus Kano, Neusser, Fukumori, Jörger & Schrödl, 2015

Species of gastropod

Aiteng marefugitus is a species of fully terrestrial sea slug found only on the Ulong Island of Palau. The species name is derived from Latin, meaning "fled from the sea".

== Description ==
A. marefugitus is a very small slug, reaching only 5.0–5.5 mm (0.20–0.22 in). It possesses a dark grey mantle on a light grey body, with two tiny black eyes. Its external anatomy is similar to other species in the genus, having neither a shell nor gills. Its excretory system is characterized by a long nephridial duct, which is assumed to reabsorb salt from the slug's urine. It lays large oocytes, which could supply its young with enough yolk to allow fully terrestrial development of the eggs.

== Evolution & Taxonomy ==
A. marefugitus is a member of the order Acochlidia, of the clade Panpulmonata. Molecular analysis revealed the species as distinct from others in its genus, and showed the species split from a common ancestor of the other two species. This speciation is predicted to have occurred in the Miocene, roughly the same time the Palauan islands were formed. After the islands' formation, the humid climate and lack of competition may have allowed the sea slug to colonize a habitat which would lack native slugs.

== Ecology ==
Ulong Island is a humid, tropical rainforest with rocky outcroppings. A. marefugitus is found at altitudes between 20 and 30 meters above sea level, where it lives within leaf litter. Though this species has not been observed feeding, other species in the genera feed on insect larvae, pupae, and gastropod eggs.
