= Aiteng ater =

Scientific classification
- Kingdom: Animalia
- Phylum: Mollusca
- Class: Gastropoda
- Family: Aitengidae
- Genus: Aiteng
- Species: A. ater

Binomial name
- Aiteng ater Swennen & Buatip, 2009

Species of gastropod

Aiteng ater is a species of sea slug, a marine gastropod mollusc in the family Aitengidae. The specific name ater is from the Latin language and means black, in reference to the appearance of the slug on the mud.

Aiteng ater was chosen by the International Institute for Species Exploration of Arizona State University to be one of the "Top 10 New Species described in 2009".

== Distribution ==
The distribution of Aiteng ater includes Thailand. The type locality is 8°29'18" N, 100°10'55" E, Amphoe Pak Phanang, Pak Phanang Bay, in the Gulf of Thailand.

== Description ==
The size of the body is 8–12 mm. The shape of the body is elongate, but broad. The color of the slug is from grey to black. The eyes are the only externally clearly visible feature on its head.

Aiteng ater has an unusual combination of morphological characters:

- Reduction of mantle cavity
- Prepharyngeal (circumpharyngeal) nerve ring
- The presence of ascus However, re-examination of the supposed "ascus" in Aiteng ater is necessary, because an examination of an undescribed species Aitengidae sp. from Japan showed no true (i.e. sacoglossan-like) ascus containing old teeth, just a radula slightly bent at the end.
- Uniseriate radula (radula with a descending and ascending limb)
- The radula has a strong rhachidian tooth
- The large, internal lateral eyes closely associated with the cerebral ganglia
- The presence of a foot groove
- A branched digestive gland.

This species lacks several acochlidian characteristics:

- It has no shell
- No tentacles
- No gills
- No cerata
- It lacks the division of the body into head-foot complex and visceral hump
- It lacks presence of 1–2 head appendages (with characteristic innervation of the rhinophores)
- Tt lacks the ability to retract the head-foot complex into the visceral hump.

Aiteng ater has a notum with a free margin. However, in the absence of a separated visceral hump, Aiteng ater is able to retract its head under the frontal part of the notum.

== Ecology ==
Aiteng ater is an amphibious species which lives in mangrove forests in the intertidal zone, on the mud. It lives "amphibiously", and tolerates marine to brackish waters, but there are no observations of these animals truly leaving the water.

Aiteng ater feeds on insects, (is insectivorous). In the laboratory it has been observed to eat pupae of beetles (Coleoptera), pupae of Lepidoptera, imagos of mosquitos and larvae of ants.

Inside the bodies of individuals of Aiteng ater, there were found to be white elongated endoparasites; these are as yet unstudied. However the "parasites" described for Aiteng ater might represent spicules instead, because the presence of spicules is confirmed for the undescribed species Aitengidae sp. from Japan.
