= Pontohedyle verrucosa =

Scientific classification
- Kingdom: Animalia
- Phylum: Mollusca
- Class: Gastropoda
- Family: Parhedylidae
- Genus: Pontohedyle
- Species: P. verrucosa

Binomial name
- Pontohedyle verrucosa (Challis, 1970)

Synonyms
- Microhedyle verrucosa Challis, 1970 (original combination)

Species of gastropod

Pontohedyle verrucosa is a species of sea slug, an acochlidian, a shell-less marine gastropod mollusc in the family Parhedylidae.

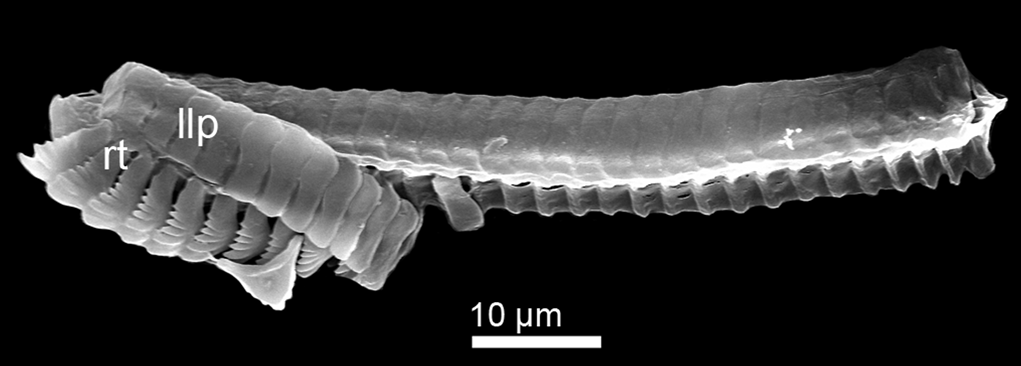
The radula of Pontohedyle verrucosa

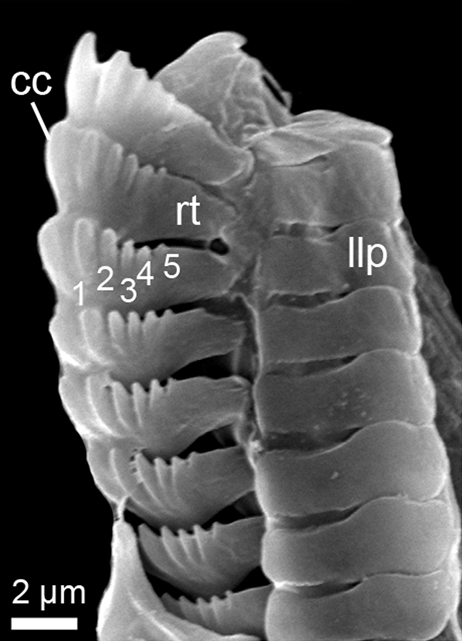
Detail of radula of Pontohedyle verrucosa showing that the lateral radula tooth (left lateral plate = llp) is smooth, without a denticle
