= Pseudunela =

- Schematic drawing of a dorsal view of Pseudunela cornuta

Scientific classification
- Kingdom: Animalia
- Phylum: Mollusca
- Class: Gastropoda
- Subclass: Heterobranchia
- Infraclass: Euthyneura
- Subterclass: Tectipleura
- Superorder: Acochlidiimorpha
- Superfamily: Acochlidioidea
- Family: Pseudunelidae; Rankin, 1979
- Genus: Pseudunela; Salvini-Plawen, 1973

Diversity
- 4 species and inadequate data on other species

Genus of gastropods

Pseudunela is a genus of minute sea slugs, acochlidians, shell-less marine or temporary brackish or brackish gastropod molluscs in the superfamily Acochlidioidea.

Pseudunela is the only genus in the family Pseudunelidae. Pseudunela is the type genus of the family Pseudunelidae.

== Taxonomy ==
Pseudunelidae was placed within the superfamily Strubellioidea in the taxonomy of Bouchet & Rocroi (2005).

Pseudunelidae was subsequently placed within the (unranked) Hedylopsacea by Schrödl & Neusser (2010).

== Species ==
These are the different species in the genus Pseudunela:

- Pseudunela cornuta (Challis, 1970) - type species of the genus Pseudunela, marine and temporary brackish
- Pseudunela eirene Wawra, 1988 - The description of Pseudunela eirene is brief and based on a single specimen with ganglia of the nervous system and stylets of copulatory organs studied on a whole-mount by light microscopy only. No histological sections were made, and the radula was studied light-microscopically after dissolving the soft parts and stylets. Information on other organ systems is absent, and no further specimens are available for study. Marine species.
- Pseudunela espiritusanta Neusser & Schrödl, 2009 This species from Espiritu Santo Island in Vanuatu lives in brackish water
- Pseudunela marteli Neusser, Jörger & Schrödl, 2011 - marine
- Pseudunela viatoris Neusser, Jörger & Schrödl, 2011 - marine

== Cladogram ==
A cladogram based on sequences of mitochondrial 18S ribosomal RNA, 16S ribosomal RNA and cytochrome-c oxidase I (COI) genes showing phylogenic relations of the genus Pseudunela:

- Pseudunela
  - Pseudunela espiritusanta
  - - Pseudunela marteli
    - - Pseudunela cornuta
      - Pseudunela viatoris
