= Circulatory system of gastropods =

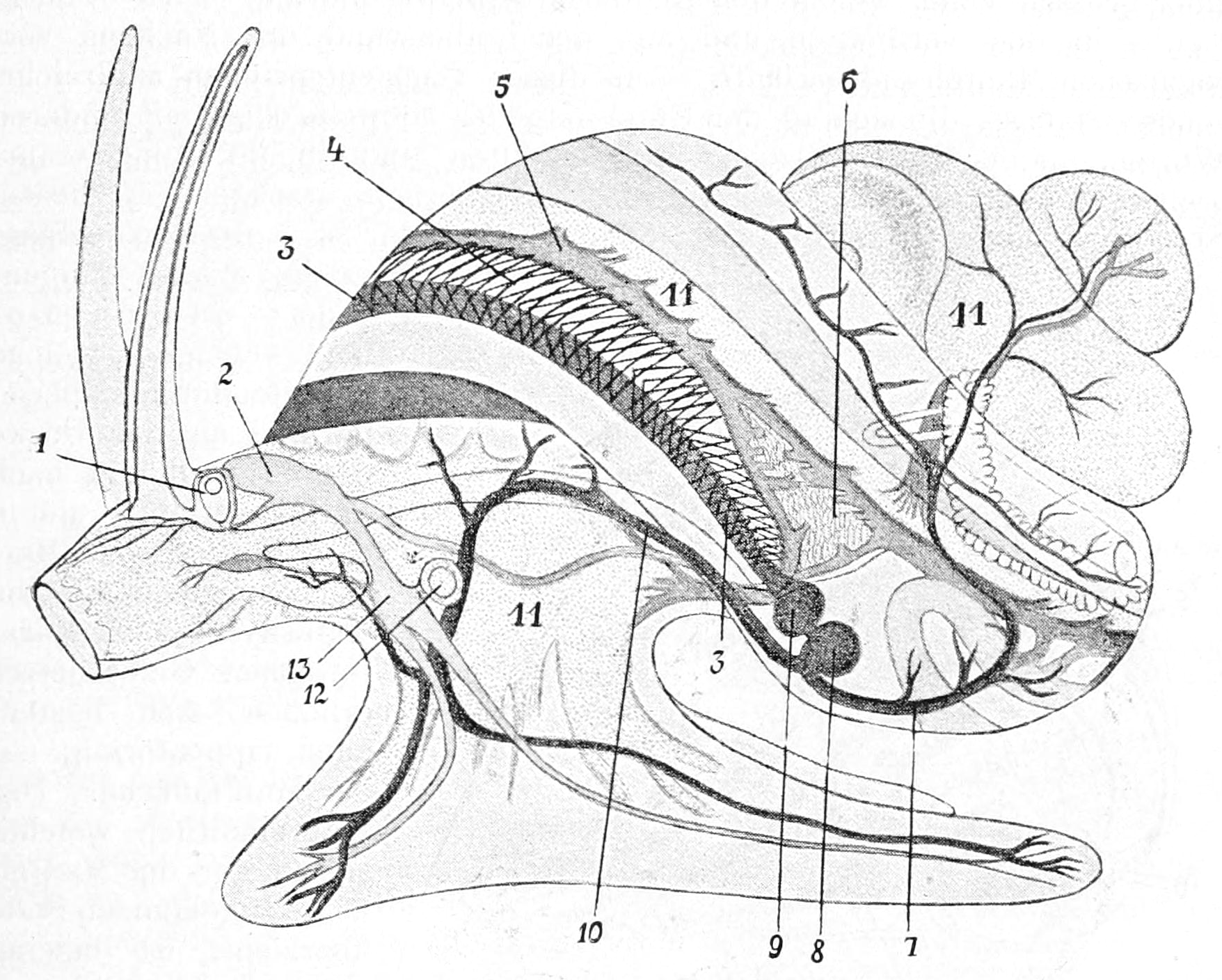
circulatory system of Viviparus contectus

As in other molluscs, the circulatory system of gastropods is open, with the fluid, or haemolymph, flowing through sinuses and bathing the tissues directly. The haemolymph typically contains haemocyanin, and is blue in colour.

== Circulation ==
The heart is muscular and located in the anterior part of the visceral mass. In the great majority of species, it has two chambers; an auricle, which receives haemolymph from the gill or lung, and a ventricle, which pumps it into the aorta. However, some primitive gastropods possess two gills, each supplying its own auricle, so that their heart has three chambers.

The aorta is relatively short, and soon divides into two main vessels, one supplying the visceral mass, and the other supplying the head and foot. In some groups, these two vessels arise directly from the heart, so that the animal may be said to have two aortas. These two vessels in turn divide into many finer vessels throughout the body, and deliver haemolymph to open arterial sinuses where it bathes and oxygenates the tissues.

De-oxygenated haemolymph drains into a large venous sinus within the head and foot, which contains the nephridium, an excretory organ with a function similar to that of the vertebrate kidney. From here it passes into vessels within the gill, or into the capillary network of the pulmonate lung, before returning to the heart.

In some genera, such as the large marine snail Busycon, the main anterior artery (which supplies the head and foot) includes an enlarged muscular region. This structure is effectively a secondary heart, and probably helps to maintain blood pressure in the vessels of the head.

== Haemolymph ==
Because of the open circulatory system of gastropods and other molluscs, there is no clear distinction between the blood and the lymph, or interstitial fluid. As a result, the circulatory fluid is commonly referred to as haemolymph, rather than blood.

The majority of gastropods have haemolymph containing the respiratory pigment haemocyanin. This is a copper-containing protein that helps to carry oxygen, and gives the haemolymph a pale blue colour. In the freshwater Planorbid snails, however, the haemocyanin is replaced by haemoglobin, and thus their haemolymph is red rather than blue. Some gastropods, such as the sea hare Aplysia, appear to lack respiratory pigments altogether.

Regardless of whether they employ haemocyanin or haemoglobin, the pigments are dissolved directly in the serum, with no equivalent of the red blood cells found in mammals. However, the haemolymph does contain amoebocytes, which may have a role in the immune system.

== See also ==
- Keyhole limpet hemocyanin
