= Osphradium =

Component of molluscan anatomy

A diagram of a hypothetical ancestral mollusc (HAM) with osphradia indicated on the far right side of the image inside the posterior mantle cavity

The osphradium is a pigmented chemosensory epithelium patch in the mantle cavity present in six of the eight extant classes of molluscs (it is absent in the Scaphopoda and Monoplacophora; most Cephalopoda also lack it, but the nautilus has what appears to be a set of osphradia), on or adjacent to the ctenidia (gills). The main function of this organ is disputed but it is believed to be used to test incoming water for silt and possible food particles or, in some species, for sensing the presence of light.

It is a popular idea among malacologists that the presence of an osphradium should be a molluscan synapomorphy. However, an osphradium is absent in monoplacophorans and scaphopods. Moreover, the differences in enervation of these patches suggest that the osphradium (as a patch enervated from the ctenidial nerve) may be different from another organ sometimes called the posterior sensory organ (PSO) with separate enervation from the lateral nerve cords. Both types of sensory organs are found in the nautilus.
