= Hepatopancreas =

Digestive gland of molluscs, arthropods and fishes

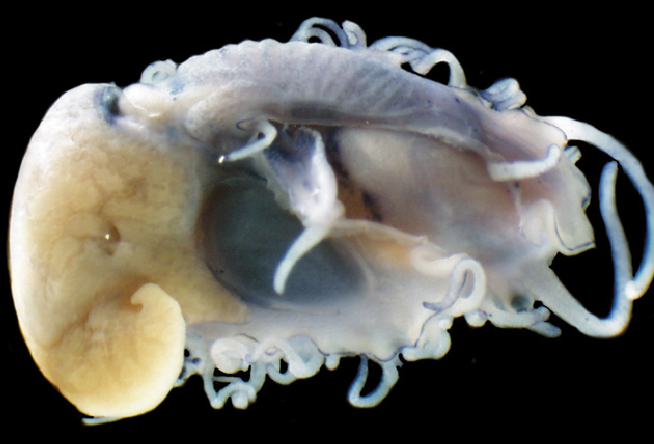
Photo of a 5-mm-long juvenile of Haliotis asinina (with the shell removed) shows the yellow hepatopancreas on the left.

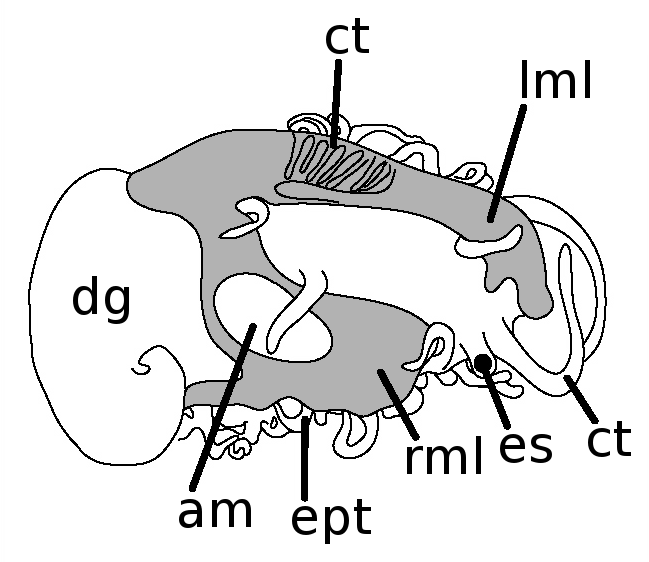
Drawing shows that the mantle (in grey) covers the majority of the dorsal surface of the animal. The gills (g), digestive gland (dg), adductor muscle (am), epipodial tentacles (ept), right mantle lobe (rml), eyespot (es), cephalic tentacles (ct) and left mantle lobe (lml) are indicated.

The hepatopancreas, digestive gland or midgut gland is an organ of the digestive tract of arthropods and molluscs. It provides the functions which in mammals are provided separately by the liver and pancreas, including the production of digestive enzymes, and absorption of digested food.

== Arthropods ==
Arthropods, especially detritivores in the isopod suborder Oniscidea (woodlice), have been shown to be able to store heavy metals in their hepatopancreas. This could lead to bioaccumulation through the food chain and implications for food web destruction, if the accumulation gets high enough in polluted areas; for example, high metal concentrations are seen in spiders of the genus Dysdera which feed on woodlice, including their hepatopancreas, the major metal storage organ of isopods in polluted sites.

== Molluscs ==
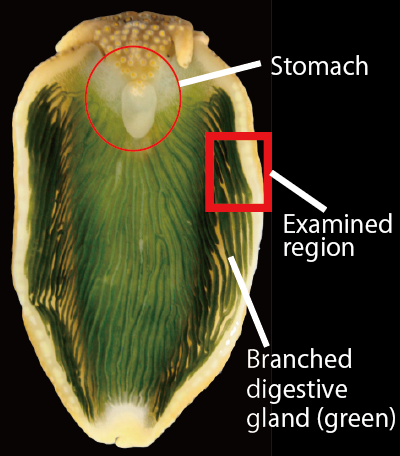
Dorsal view of an anesthetized individual of Plakobranchus ocellatus with spread parapodia. Stomach and branched parapodial digestive glands are visible. The tissue region in the red square was dissected and used for DNA extraction in the study by Maeda T. et al. (2012).

The hepatopancreas is a centre for lipid metabolism and for storage of lipids in gastropods.

Some species in the genus Phyllodesmium harbor active zooxanthellae of the genus Symbiodinium in the hepatopancreas.

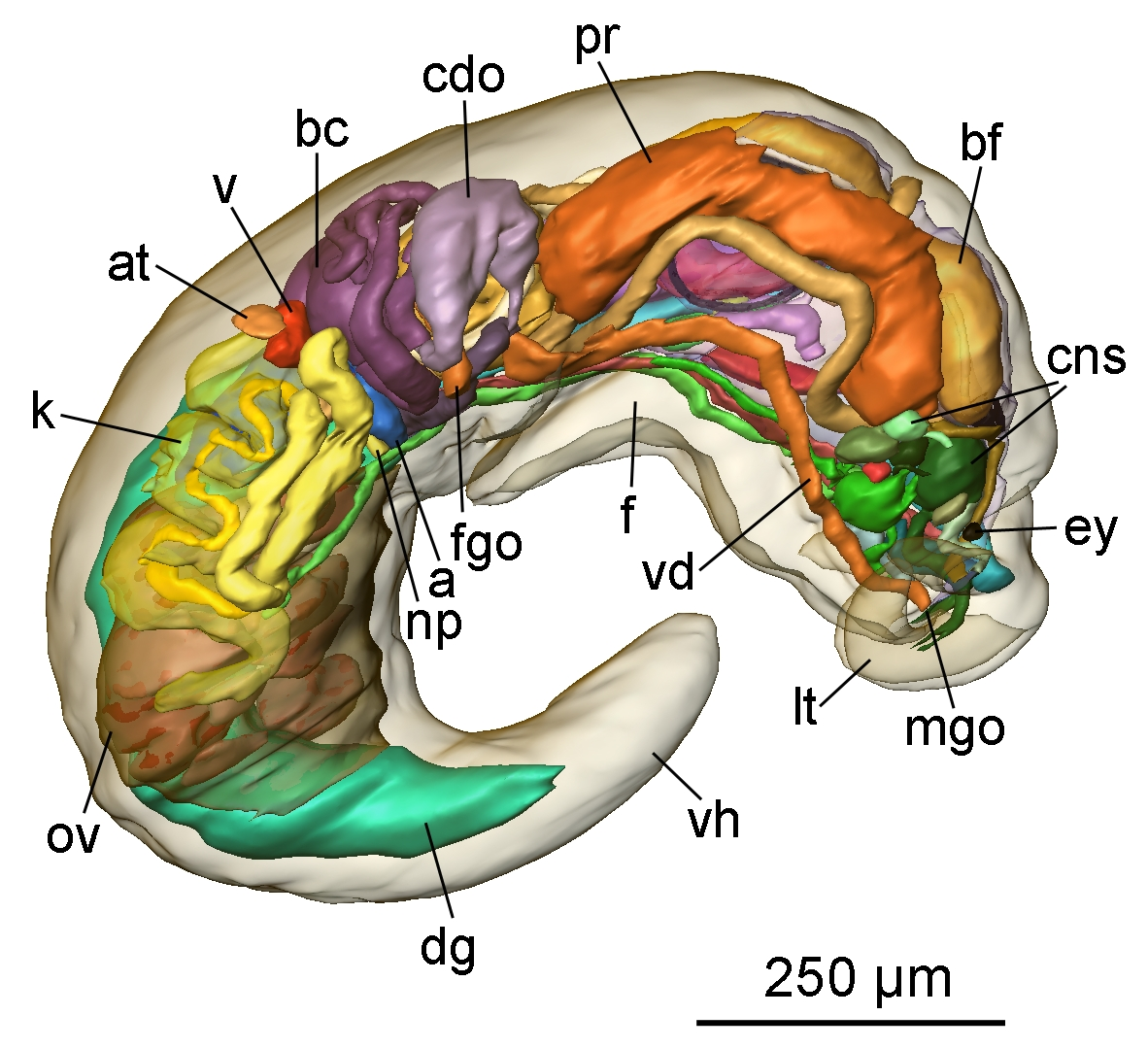
3D reconstruction of the general anatomy of Pseudunela cornuta shows the digestive gland (dg) in green color

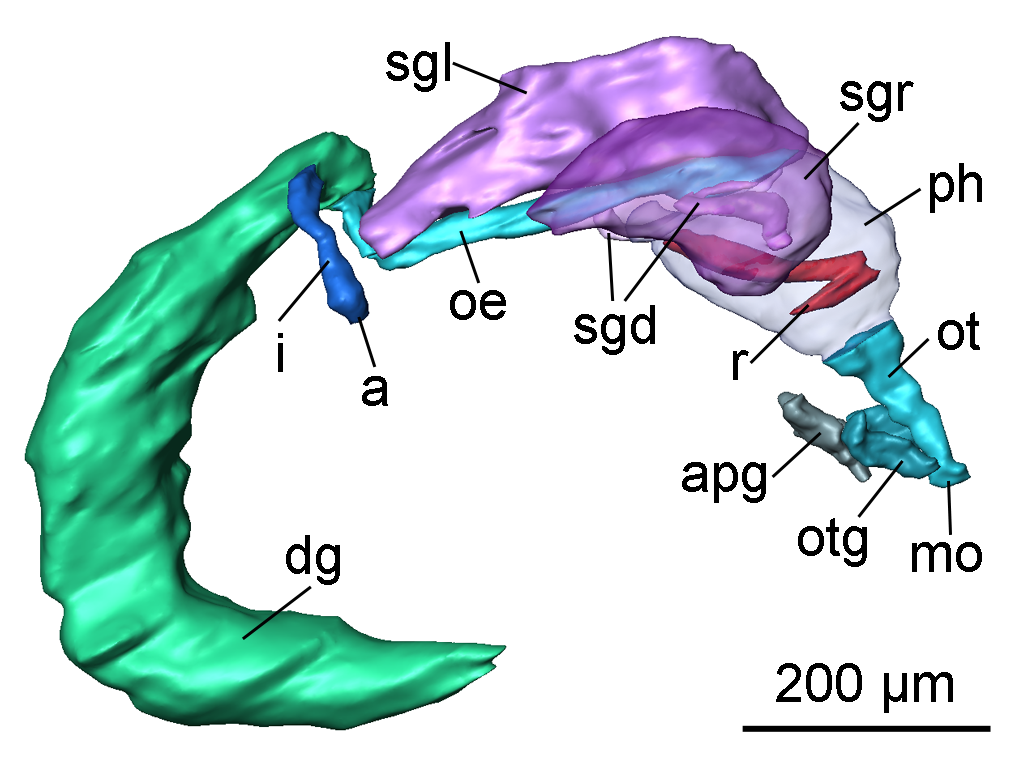
3D reconstruction of the digestive system of Pseudunela cornuta shows the digestive gland (dg) more clearly

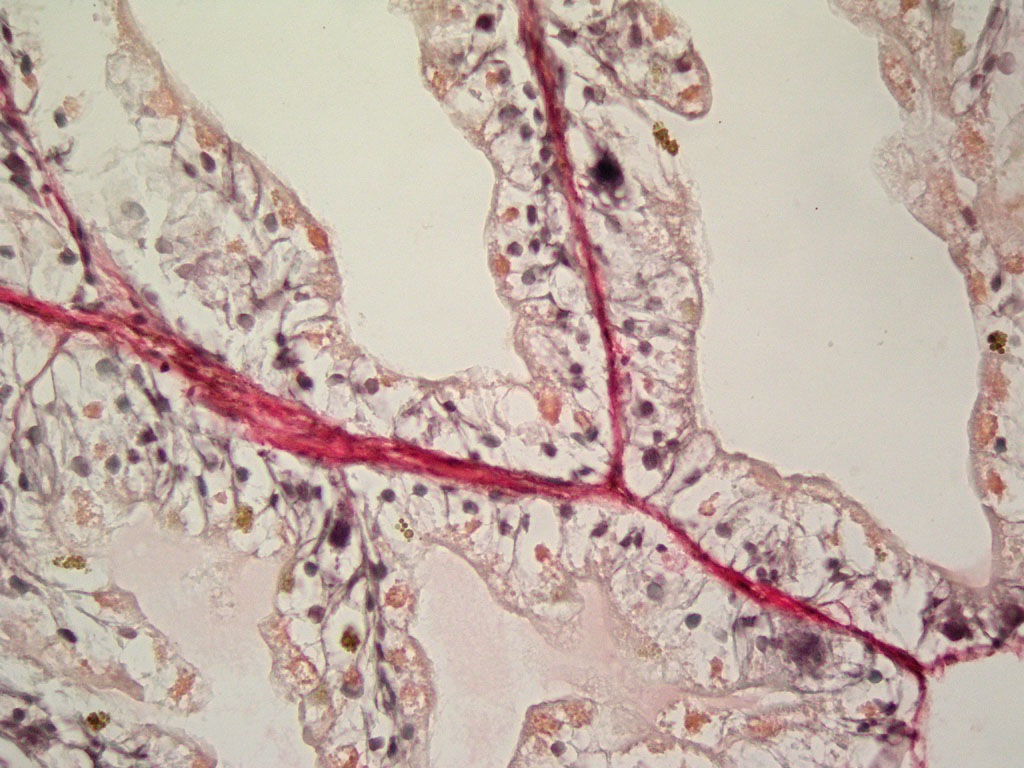
Histology section of hepatopancreas of slug Deroceras laeve

== See also ==
- Crab duplex-specific nuclease
- Digestive system of gastropods
- Tomalley, the hepatopancreas of crustaceans, often used as food
