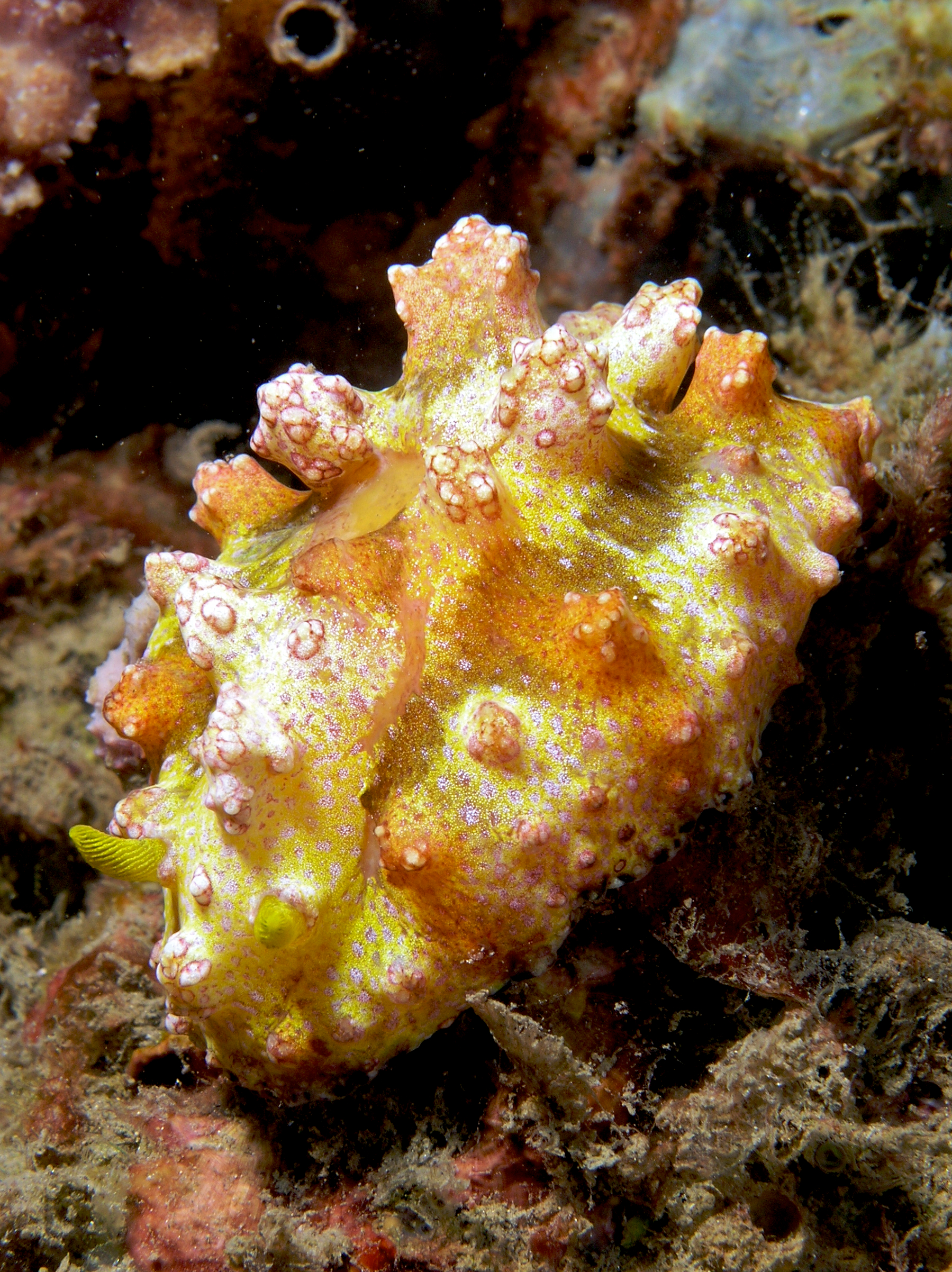
- Phyllidiopsis cardinalis, head end at the bottom of the image

Scientific classification
- Kingdom: Animalia
- Phylum: Mollusca
- Class: Gastropoda
- Order: Nudibranchia
- Infraorder: Doridoidei
- Superfamily: Phyllidioidea
- Family: Phyllidiidae
- Genus: Phyllidiopsis; Bergh, 1876

Type species
- Phyllidiopsis cardinalis Bergh, 1876

= Phyllidiopsis =

Genus of gastropods

Phyllidiopsis is a genus of sea slugs, dorid nudibranchs, shell-less marine gastropod molluscs and is the largest genus within the family Phyllidiidae.

== Description ==
The species in this genus differ from the other genera in this family by possessing an elongate foregut and fused oral tentacles.

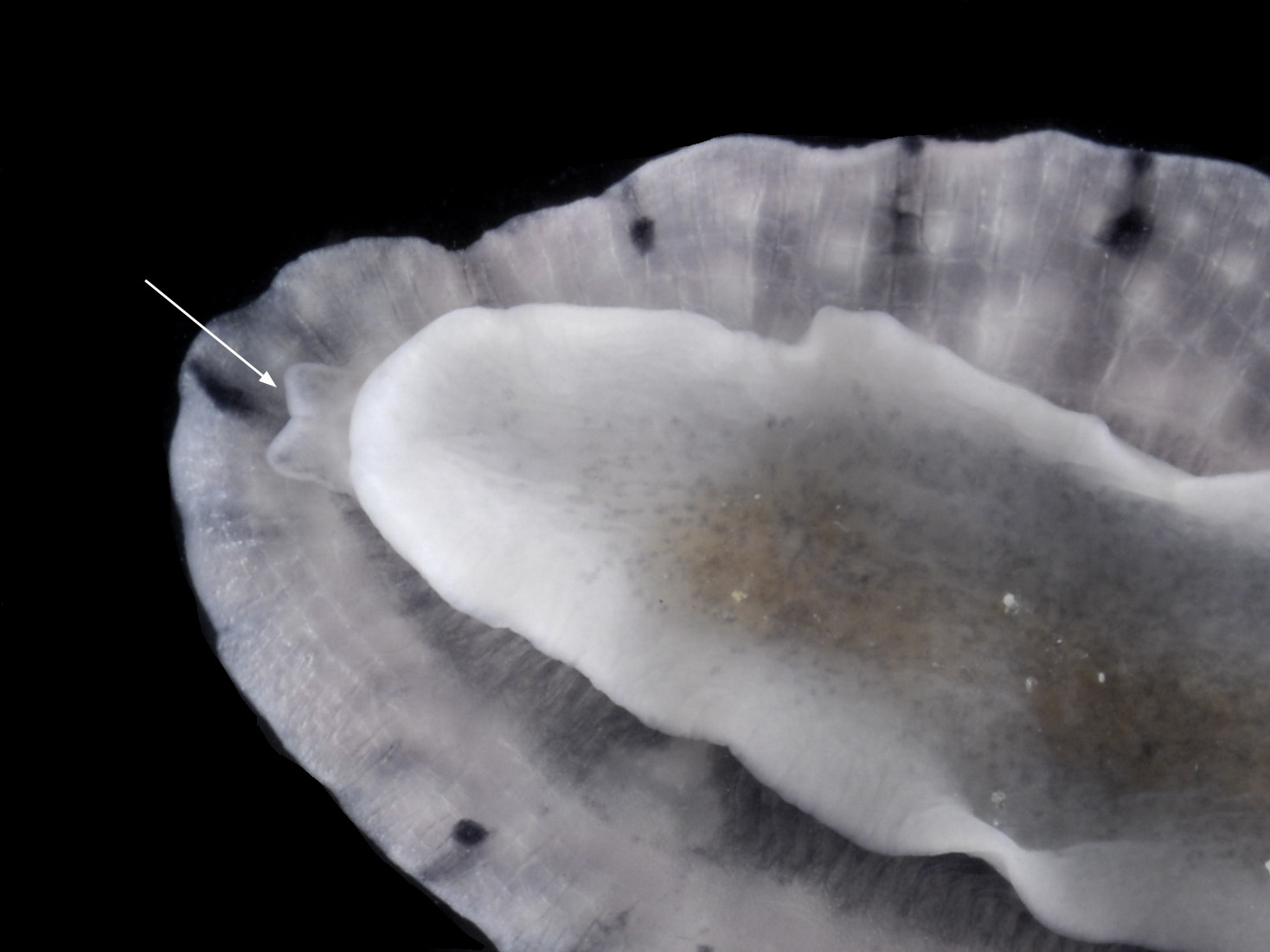
Phyllidiopsis krempfi - underside of head showing fused oral tentacles

== Distribution ==
These nudibranchs can be found in the tropical Indo-Pacific region, the eastern Pacific region, in the Red Sea, in the Caribbean Sea and a few in the Northwest Atlantic Ocean. About half of the described species can be found in deep waters. Among these deep-water sea slugs, there is a group of white species, lacking all contrasting colors.

== Species ==
There are presently about 30 species in the genus Phyllidiopsis including :

- Phyllidiopsis annae Brunckhorst, 1993
- Phyllidiopsis anomala Valdés, 2001
- Phyllidiopsis bayi (Bouchet, 1983)
- Phyllidiopsis berghi Vayssière, 1902
- Phyllidiopsis blanca Gosliner & Behrens, 1988
- Phyllidiopsis boucheti Valdes & Ortea, 1996
- Phyllidiopsis brunckhorsti Valdés, 2001
- Phyllidiopsis burni Brunckhorst, 1993
- Phyllidiopsis cardinalis Bergh, 1876 : type species of the genus Phyllidiopsis
- Phyllidiopsis circularis Valdés, 2001
- Phyllidiopsis crucifera Valdés, 2001
- Phyllidiopsis dautzenbergi (Vayssière, 1912)
- Phyllidiopsis fissurata Brunckhorst, 1993
- Phyllidiopsis futunai Valdés, 2001
- Phyllidiopsis gemmata Pruvot-Fol, 1957
- Phyllidiopsis holothuriana Valdés, 2001
- Phyllidiopsis krempfi Pruvot-Fol, 1957
- Phyllidiopsis loricata (Bergh, 1873)
- Phyllidiopsis lozoueti Valdés, 2001
- Phyllidiopsis macrotuberculata Valdés, 2001
- Phyllidiopsis monacha (Yonow, 1986)
- Phyllidiopsis neocaledonica Valdés, 2001
- Phyllidiopsis phiphiensis Brunckhorst, 1993
- Phyllidiopsis pipeki Brunckhorst, 1993
- Phyllidiopsis quadrilineata (Bergh, 1905)
- Phyllidiopsis richeri Valdés, 2001
- Phyllidiopsis shireenae Brunckhorst, 1990
- Phyllidiopsis sinaiensis (Yonow, 1988)
- Phyllidiopsis sphingis Brunckhorst, 1993
- Phyllidiopsis vanuatuensis Valdés, 2001
- Phyllidiopsis xishaensis (Lin, 1983)

Species brought into synonymy

- Phyllidiopsis carinata Eliot, 1910 : synonym of Phyllidia ocellata Cuvier, 1804
- Phyllidiopsis fissuratus Brunckhorst, 1993: synonym of Phyllidiopsis fissurata Brunckhorst, 1993 (incorrect gender agreement of specific epithet)
- Phyllidiopsis gynenopla Bouchet, 1977: synonym of Phyllidiopsis berghi Vayssière, 1902
- Phyllidiopsis molaensis Meyer, 1977 accepted as Phyllidiella molaensis (Meyer, 1977) (original combination)
- Phyllidiopsis papilligera Bergh, 1890: synonym of Ceratophyllidia papilligera (Bergh, 1890)
- Phyllidiopsis striata Bergh, 1888: synonym of Phyllidiella striata (Bergh, 1890)

A maximum-parsimony analysis of the nucleotide sequence of the 16S mtDNA gene, performed in 2003, has shown that the genus Phyllidiopsis is paraphyletic.

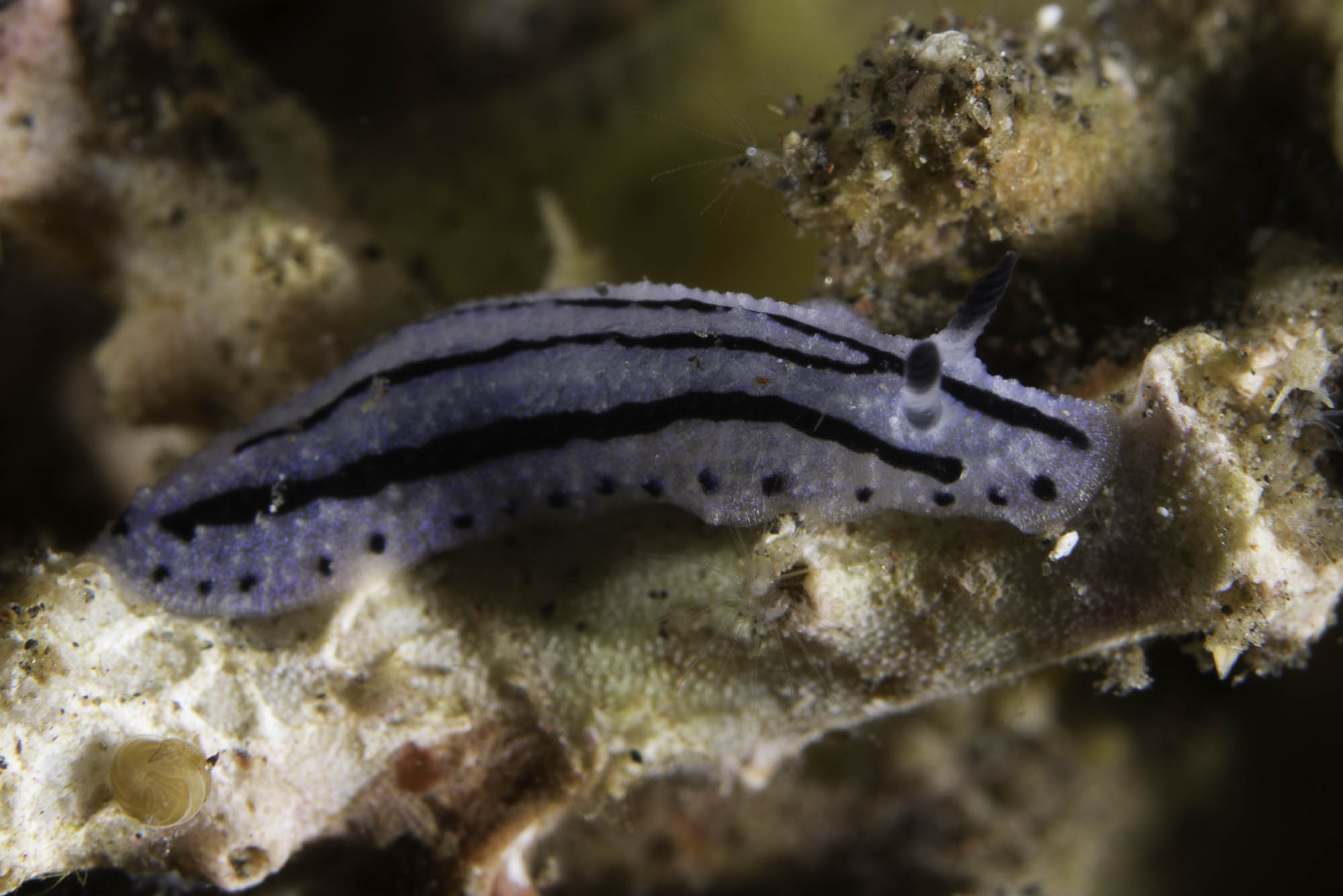
Phyllidiopsis annae

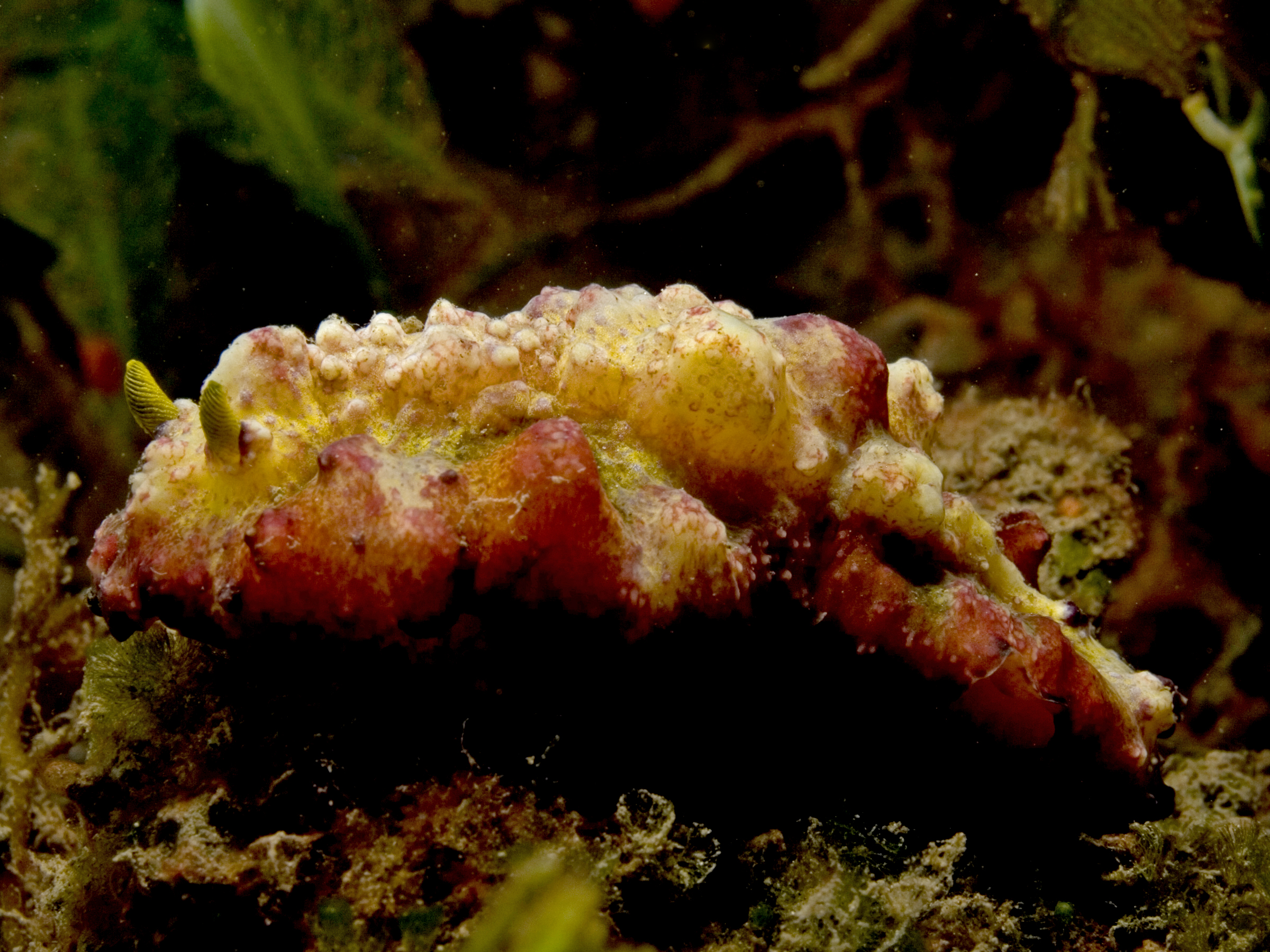
Phyllidiopsis cardinalis

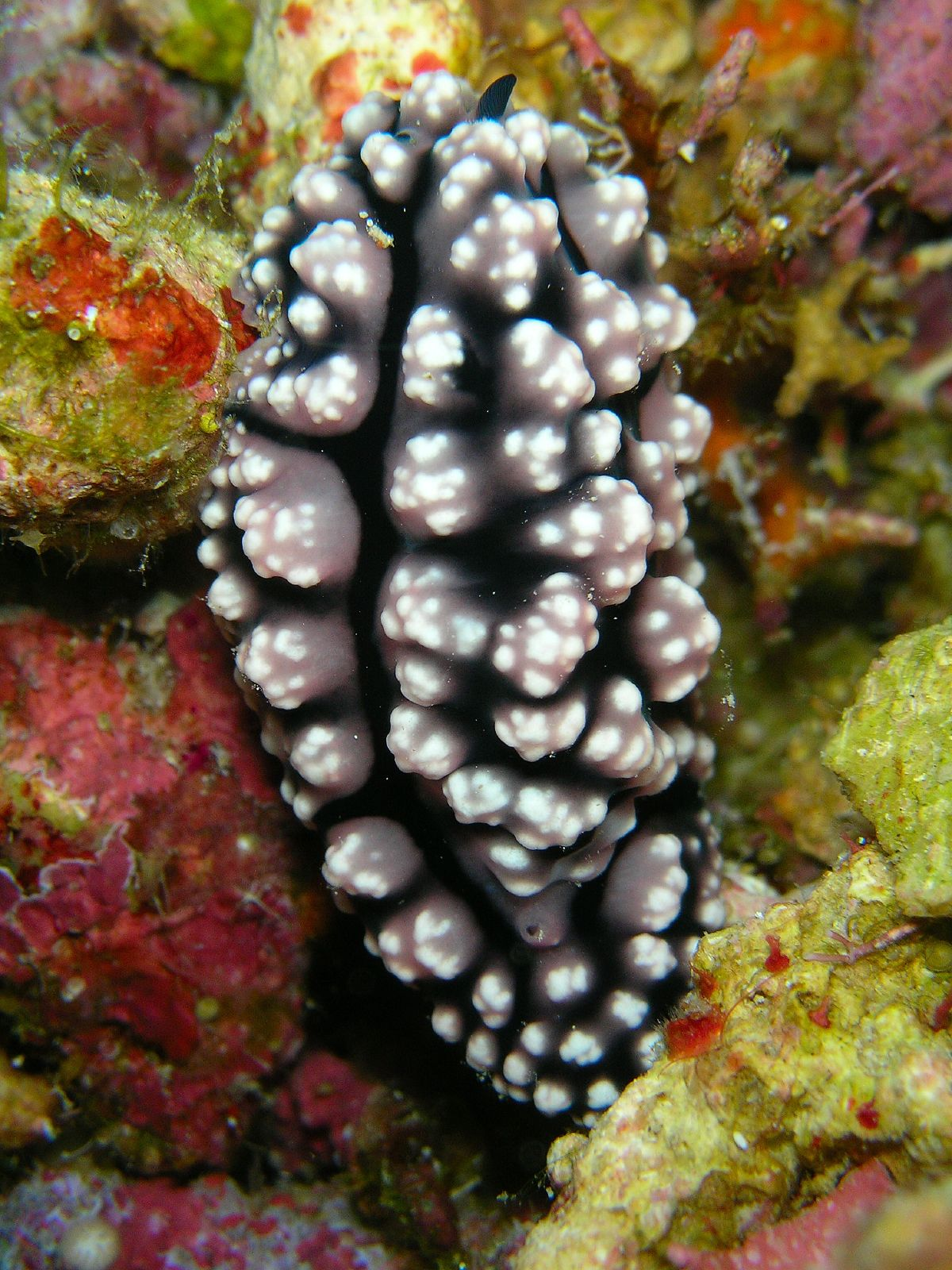
Phyllidiopsis fissuratus

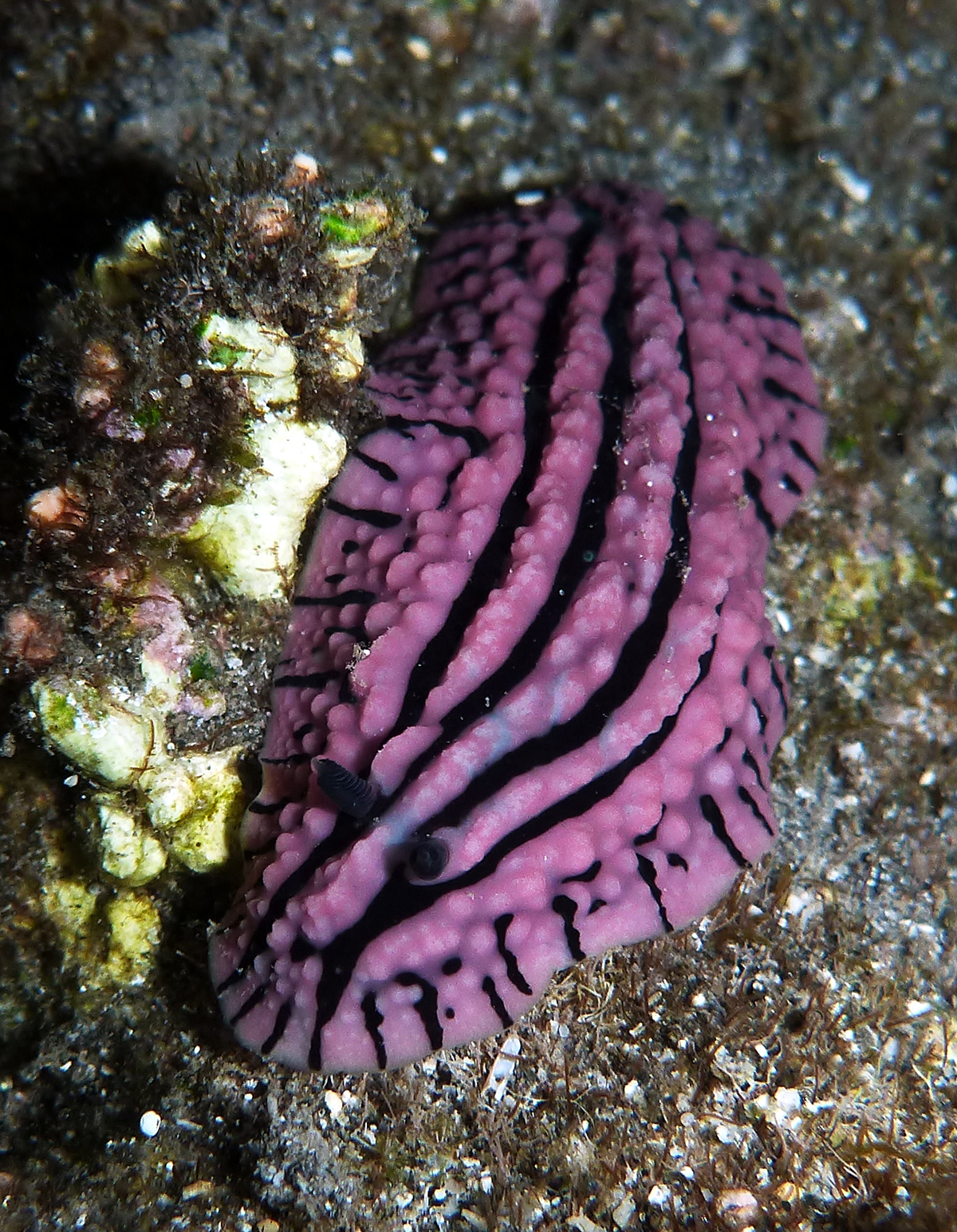
Phyllidiopsis gemmata

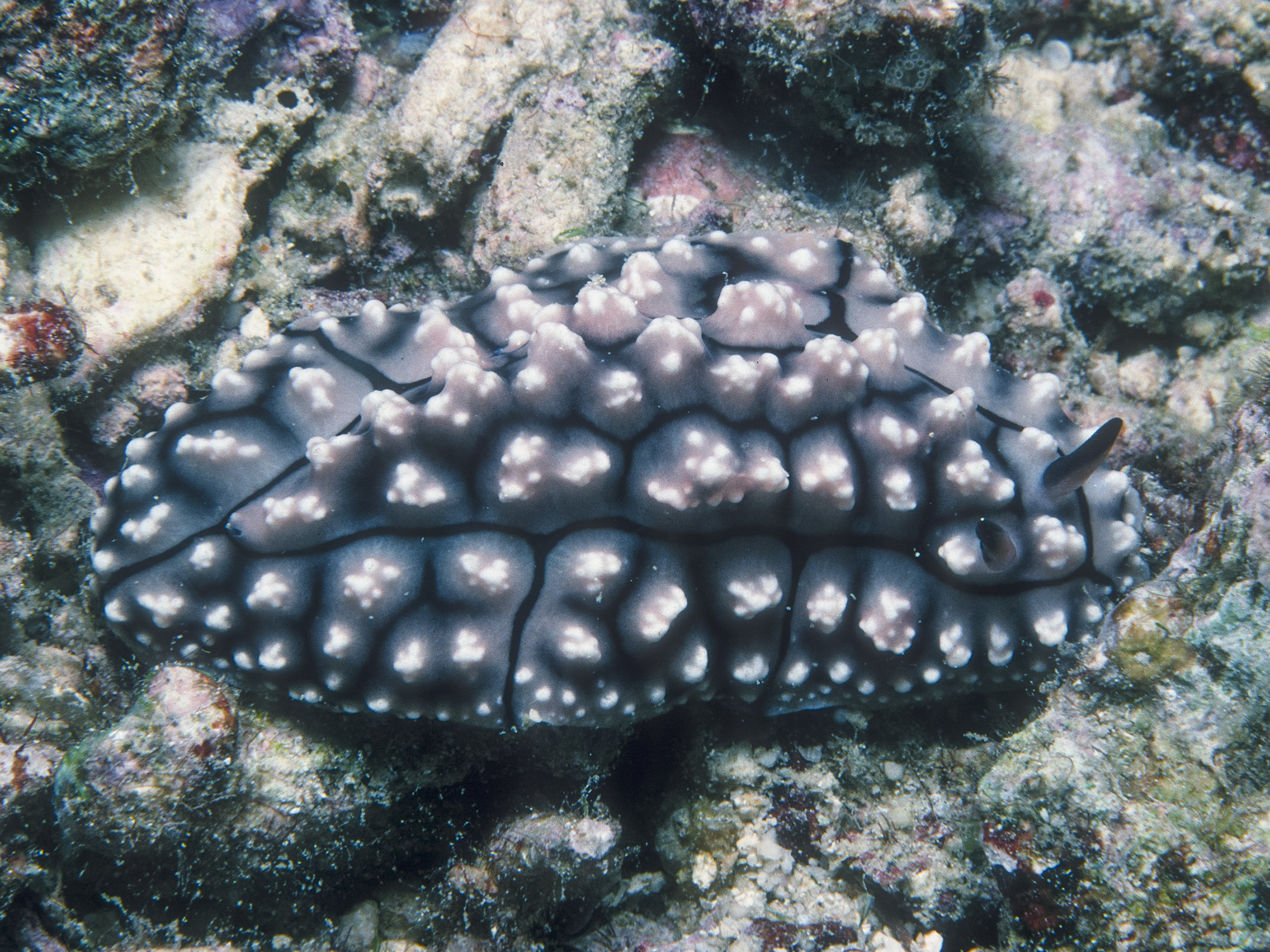
Phyllidiopsis krempfi

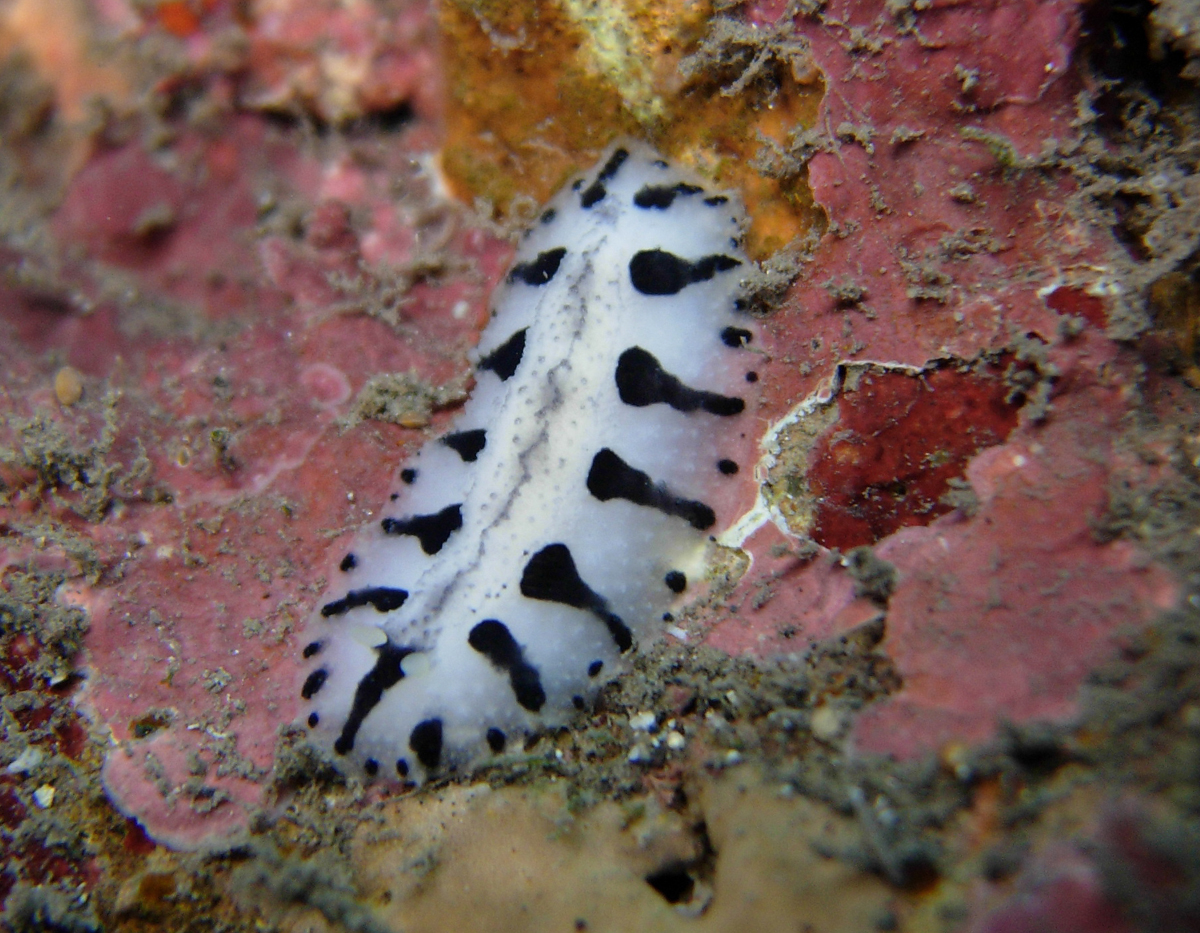
Phyllidiopsis loricata

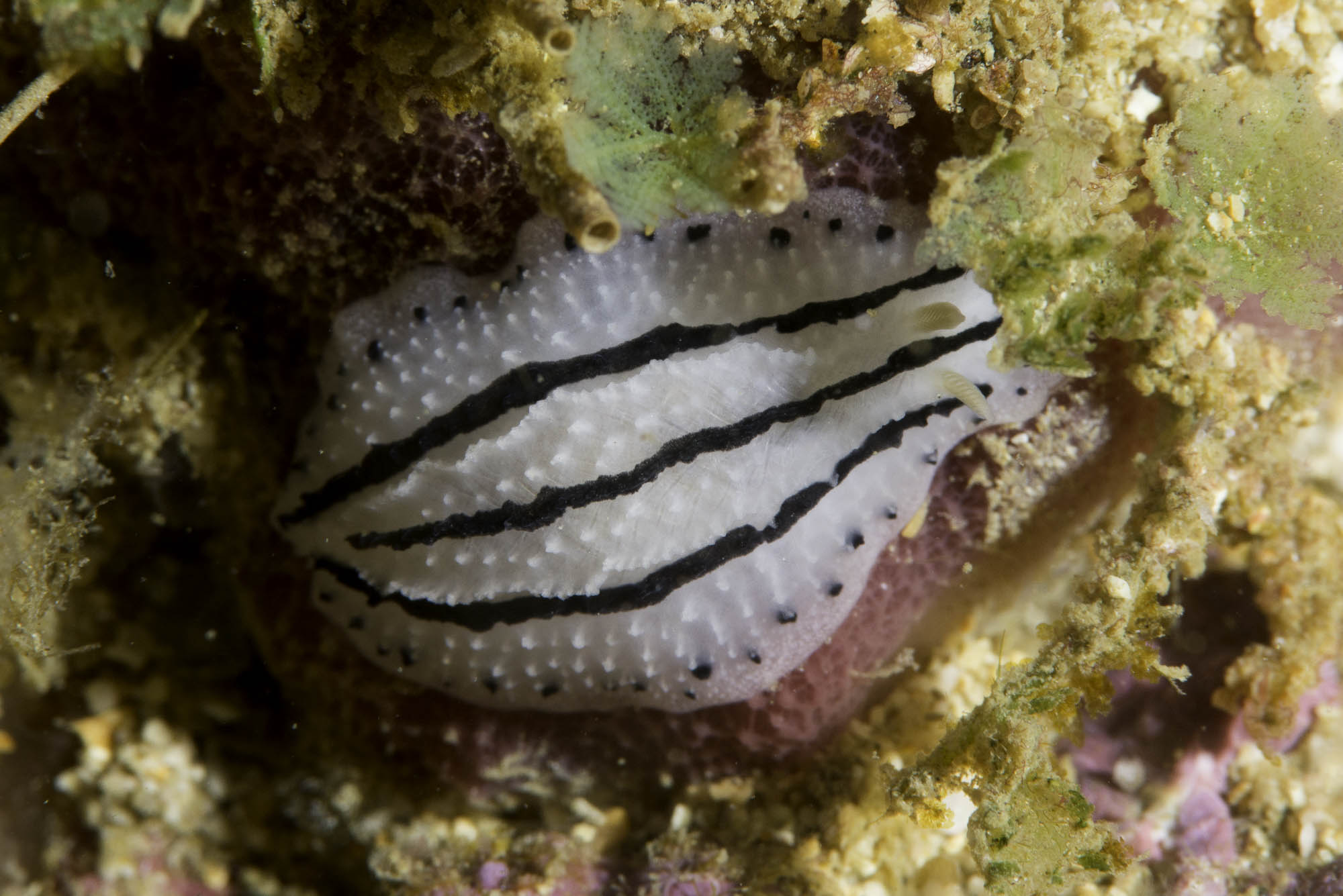
Phyllidiopsis phiphiensis

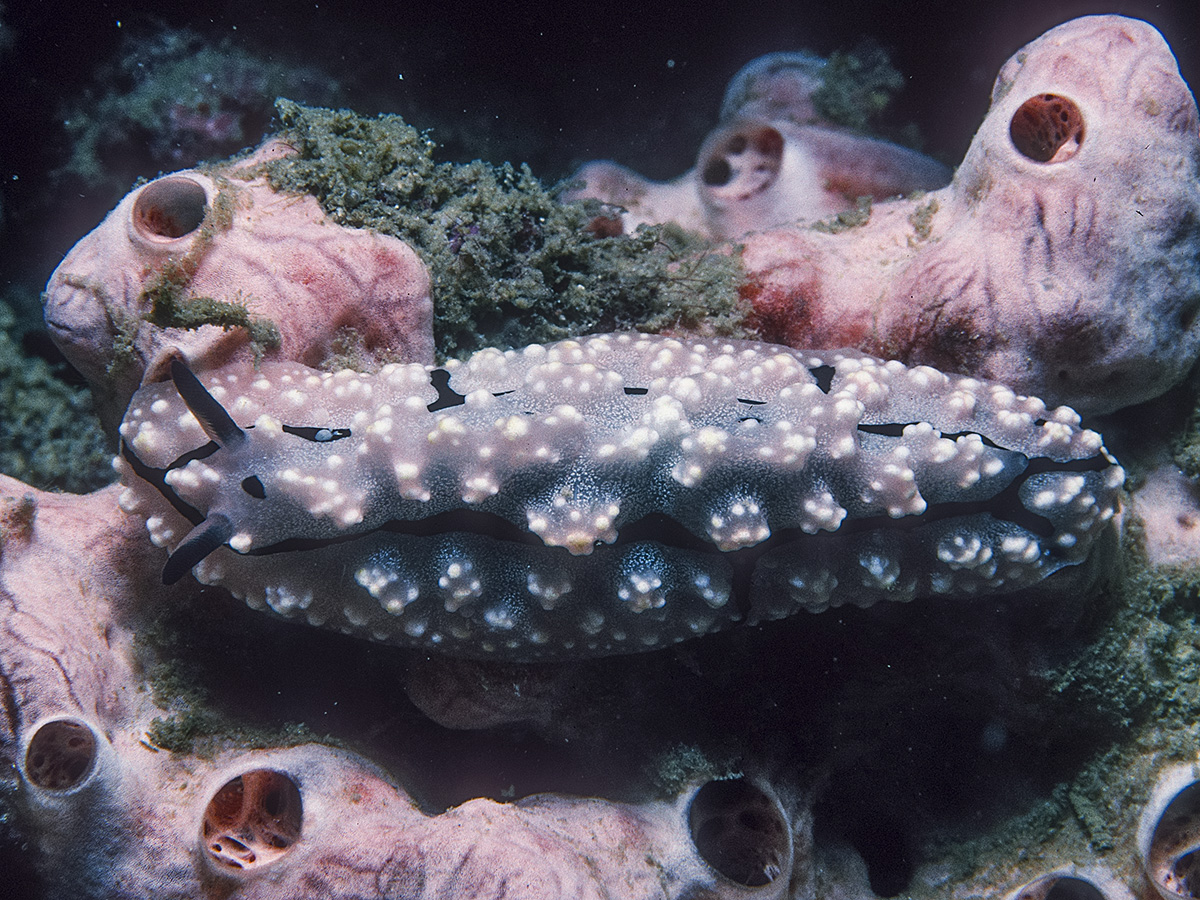
Phyllidiopsis pipeki

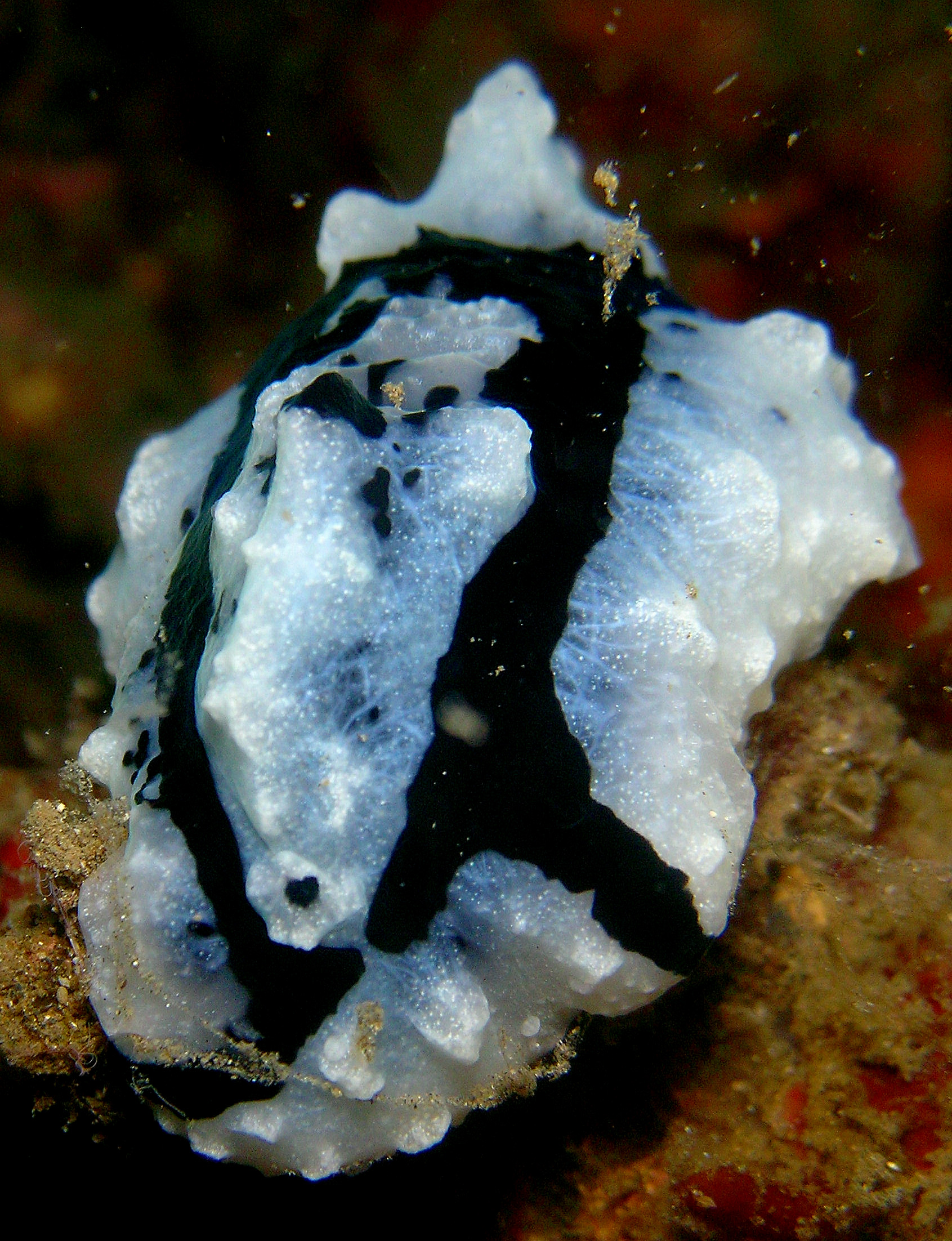
Phyllidiopsis shireenae

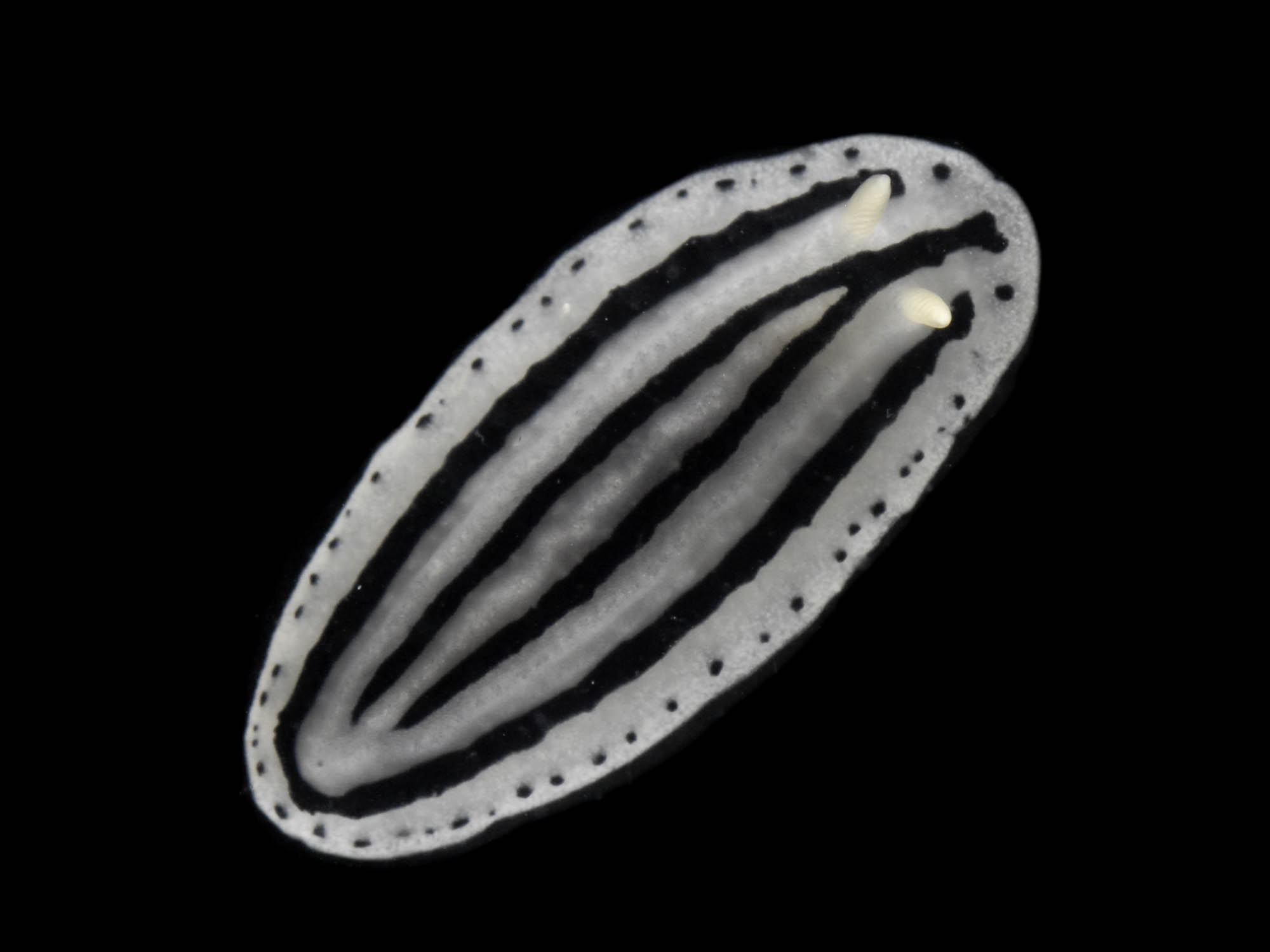
Phyllidiopsis xishaensis

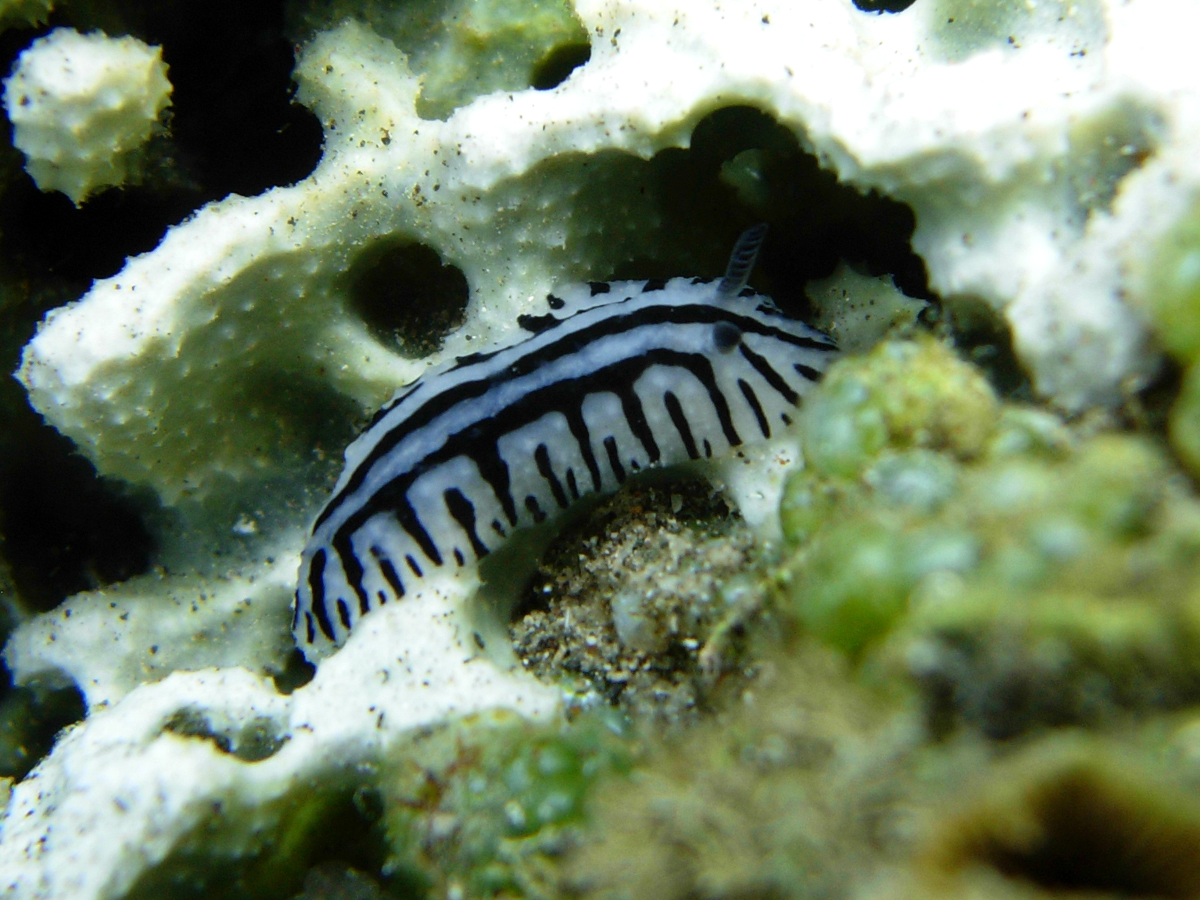
Phyllidiopsis sp. 1

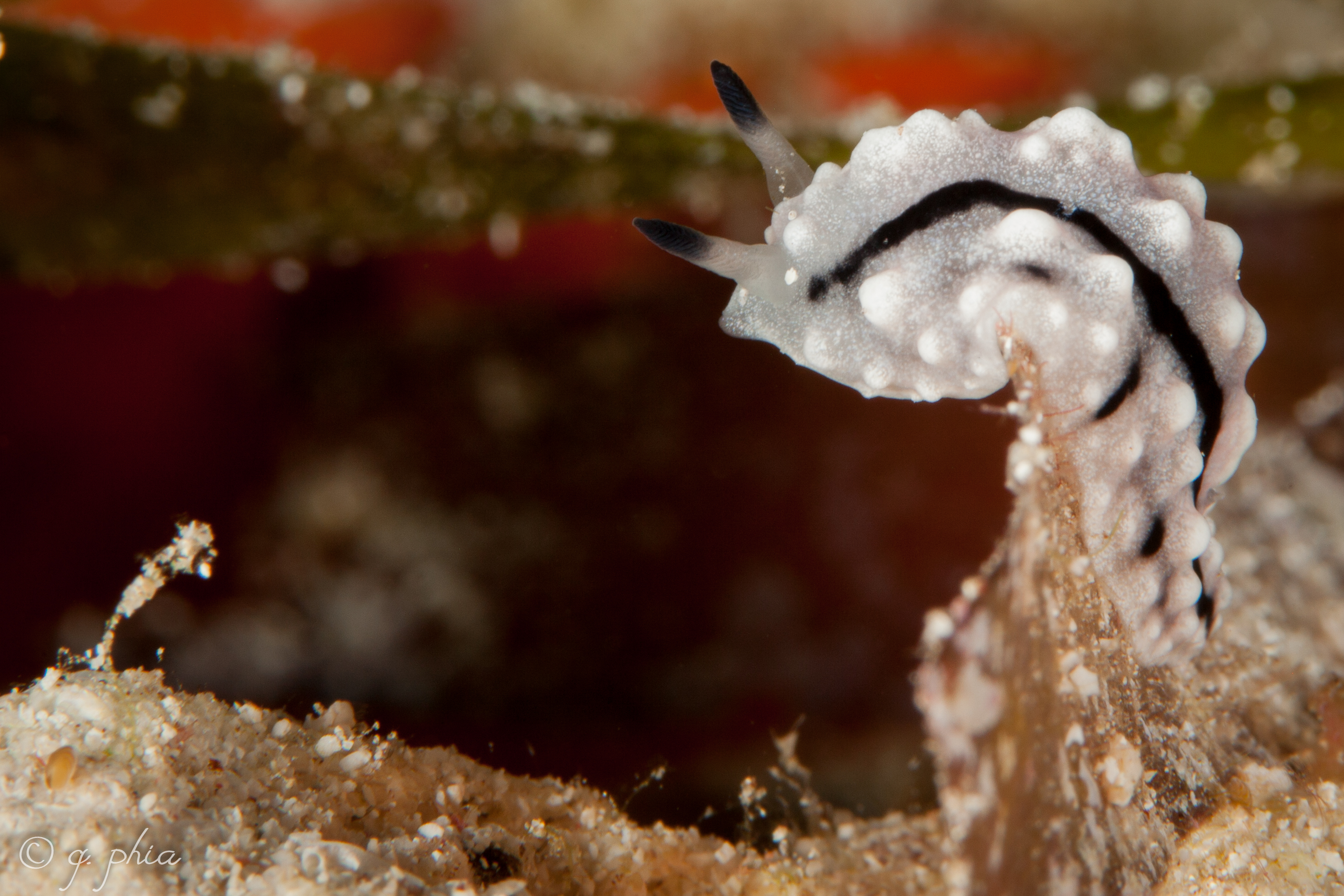
Phyllidiopsis unknown species at Wakatobi National Park, 2016

== Bibliography ==
- Bergh, L. S. R. (1889). Malacologische Untersuchungen. In: Reisen im Archipel der Philippinen von Dr. Carl Gottfried Semper. Zweiter Theil. Wissenschaftliche Resultate. Band 2, Theil 3, Heft 16, 2 Hälfte, pp. 815–872, pls. 82–84.; p. 859
- Bergh, L. S. R. (1890). Report on the results of dredging, under the supervision of Alexander Agassiz, in the Gulf of Mexico (1877–1878), and in the Caribbean Sea (1879–1880), by the U.S. Coast Survey steamer “Blake”, Lieut.-Commander C. D. Sigsbee, U.S.N., and Commander J. R. Bartlett, U.S.N., commanding. Report on the nudibranchs. Bulletin of the Museum of Comparative Zoology, Harvard 19(3):155-181, pls. 1–3.; p. 175
- Bergh, L. S. R. (1892). Die Nudibranchiata holohepatica porostomata. Verhandlungen der königlich-kaiserlich Zoologisch-botanischen Gesellschaft in Wien Abhandlungen) 42:1-16.; p. 16
- Bergh, L. S. R. 1897. Opisthobranchiaten. Ergebnisse einer Forschungsreise in den Molukken und Borneo, im Aufträge der Senckenbergischen naturforshenden Gesellschaft ausgeführt von Dr. Willy Kukenthal. Abhandlungen Herausgegeben von der Senckenbergischen Naturforschenden Gesellschaft 24(1):95-130, pls. 12–13.; p. 112
- Eliot, C. N. E. (1906). Nudibranchiata, with some remarks on the families and genera and description of a new genus, Doridomorpha, pp. 540–573, pl. 32. In: J. Stanley Gardiner (Ed.) The fauna and geography of the Maldive and Laccadive Archipelagoes, being the account of the work carried on and of the collections made by an expedition during the years 1899 and 1900, vol. 2.; p. 563
- Marcus, Ev., & Er. Marcus. (1962). Opisthobranchs from Florida and the Virgin Islands. Bulletin of Marine Science Gulf & Caribbean 12(3):450-488.; p. 478
- Pruvot-Fol, A. (1954). Mollusques Opisthobranches. Faune de France, Paris 58:1-460, pl. 1; p. 329
- Vayssière, A. J. B. M. (1913). Mollusques de la France et des régions voisines, tome premier, amphineures, gasteropodes opisthobranches, heteropodes, marseniades et oncidiides. Encyclopedie Scientifique, publiee sous la direction du Dr. Toulouse, Bibliothèque de Zoologie Doin, Paris, pp. 1–420, I-XII, pls. 1-37. [Nudibranchia pp. 243–365]; p. 364
- Yonow N. (2012) Opisthobranchs from the western Indian Ocean, with descriptions of two new species and ten new records (Mollusca, Gastropoda). ZooKeys 197: 1–129. [22 May 2012&#93.
