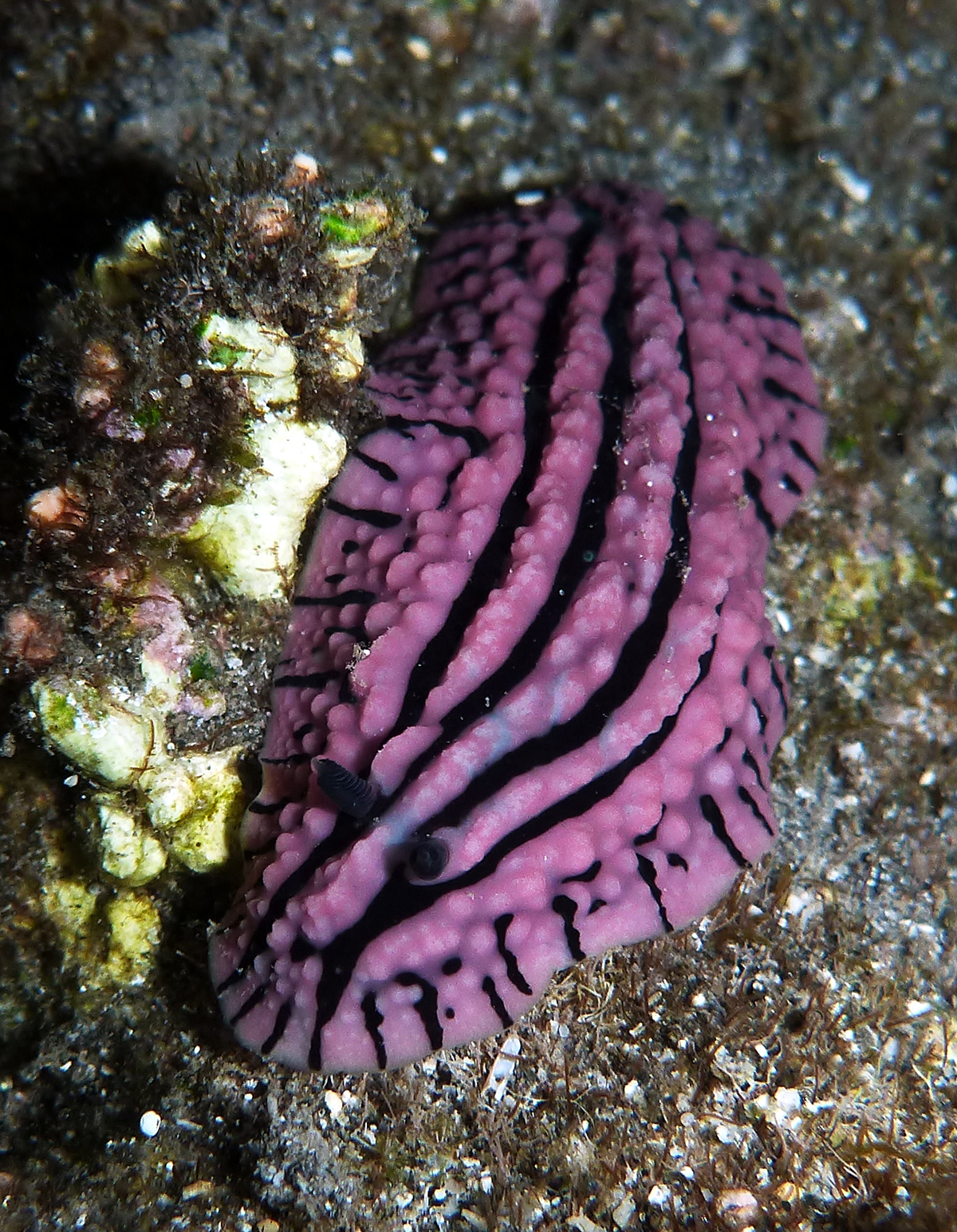
- Phyllidiopsis gemmata, Réunion, Indian Ocean

Scientific classification
- Kingdom: Animalia
- Phylum: Mollusca
- Class: Gastropoda
- Order: Nudibranchia
- Family: Phyllidiidae
- Genus: Phyllidiopsis
- Species: P. gemmata

Binomial name
- Phyllidiopsis gemmata Pruvot-Fol, 1957

= Phyllidiopsis gemmata =

Species of gastropod

Phyllidiopsis gemmata is a species of sea slug, a dorid nudibranch, a shell-less marine gastropod mollusk in the family Phyllidiidae.

== Distribution ==
This species was described from Java, Indonesia. It has been reported from Réunion Island and southern Thailand.

== Description ==
This nudibranch has a grey or pink dorsum with compound tubercles with white apices. There are four longitudinal black lines and radiating black lines between the outer line and the edge of the mantle. It is a moderately large Phyllidiid, growing to at least 45 mm in length. It is similar to Phyllidiopsis krempfi but that species has a pattern of black lines on the back.

== Diet ==
This species feeds on a sponge.
