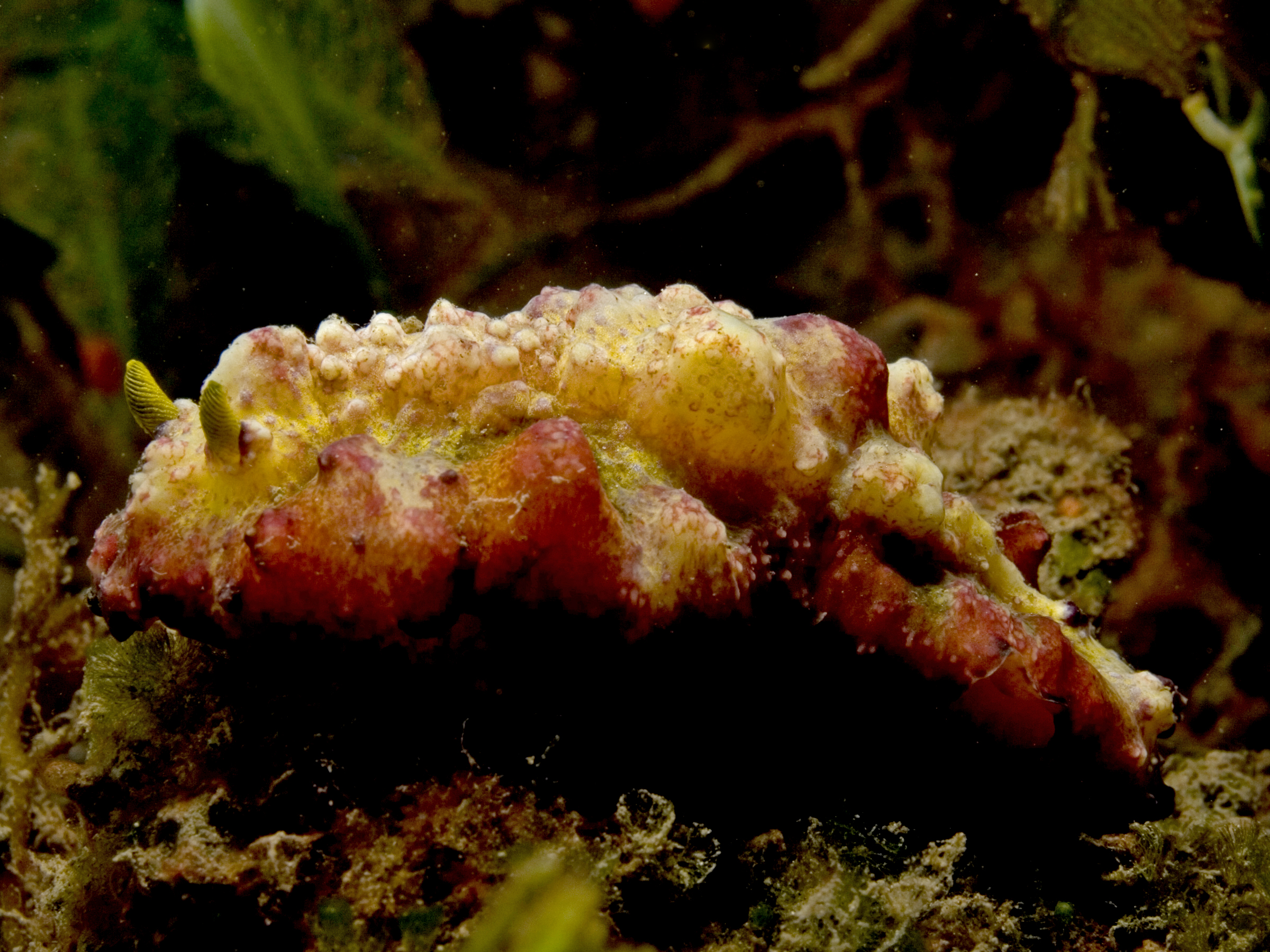
- Phyllidiopsis cardinalis

Scientific classification
- Kingdom: Animalia
- Phylum: Mollusca
- Class: Gastropoda
- Order: Nudibranchia
- Family: Phyllidiidae
- Genus: Phyllidiopsis
- Species: P. cardinalis

Binomial name
- Phyllidiopsis cardinalis Bergh, 1876

Synonyms
- Phyllidia tuberculata Risbec, 1928

= Phyllidiopsis cardinalis =

Species of gastropod

Phyllidiopsis cardinalis is a species of sea slug, a dorid nudibranch, a shell-less marine gastropod mollusk in the family Phyllidiidae.

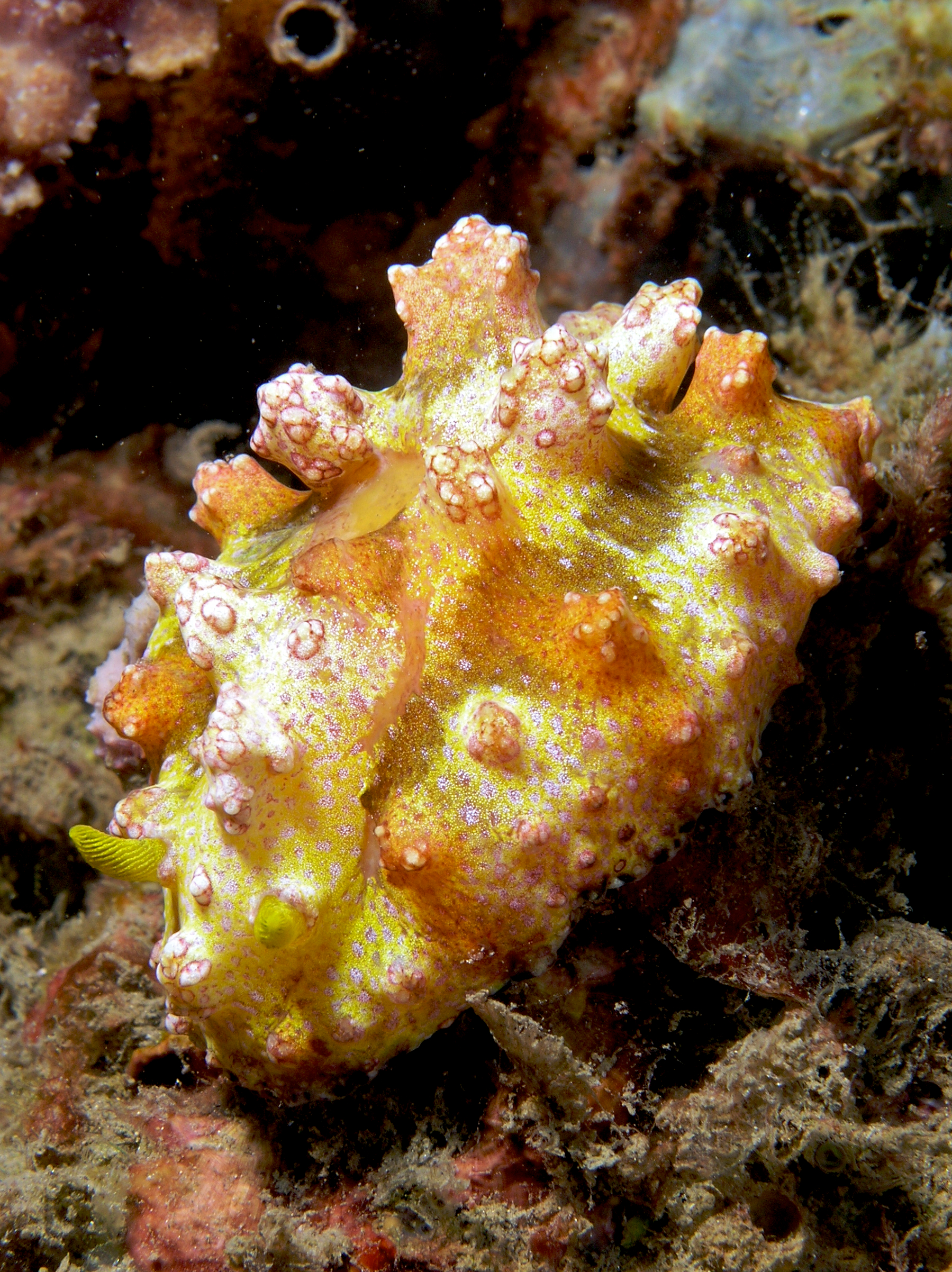
Phyllidiopsis cardinalis
