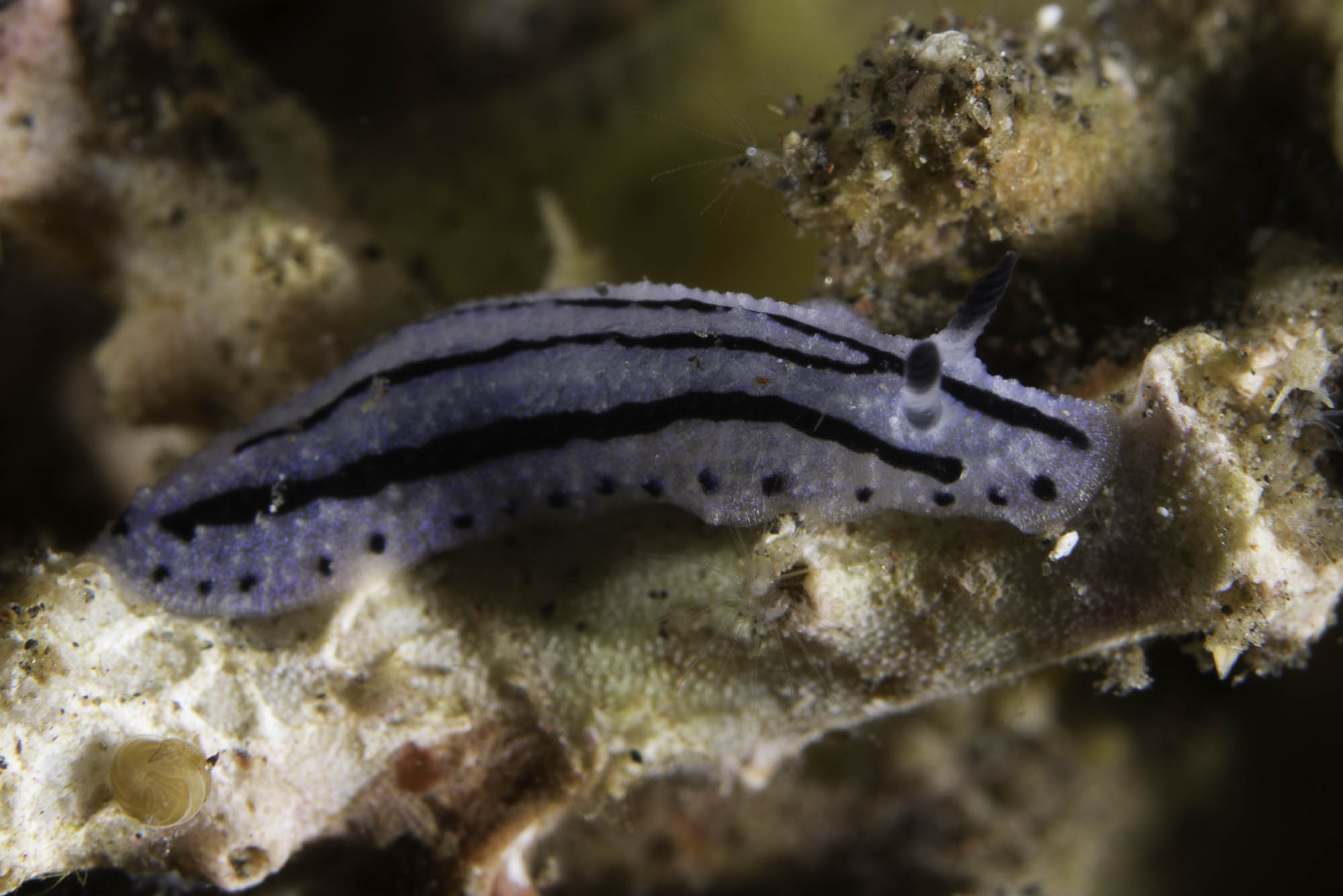
- The nudibranch Phyllidiopsis annae, Batu Belah, Bali.

Scientific classification
- Kingdom: Animalia
- Phylum: Mollusca
- Class: Gastropoda
- Order: Nudibranchia
- Family: Phyllidiidae
- Genus: Phyllidiopsis
- Species: P. annae

Binomial name
- Phyllidiopsis annae Brunckhorst, 1993

= Phyllidiopsis annae =

Species of gastropod

Phyllidiopsis annae is a species of sea slug, a dorid nudibranch, a shell-less marine gastropod mollusk in the family Phyllidiidae.

== Distribution ==
This species was described from Phi Phi Island, southern Thailand. It has been reported from Indonesia, Papua New Guinea and Vietnam.

== Description ==
This nudibranch has a blue dorsum with four longitudinal black lines interspersed with raised ridges. It is a small Phyllidiid, growing to about 15 mm in length. There are black spots in the region between the outer black lines and the edge of the mantle. The rhinophores are black. It is similar to Phyllidiopsis xishaensis except for the colour of the rhinophores, which are white in that species. Phyllidiopsis phiphiensis is also similar but has three instead of four longitudinal black lines on the mantle.

== Diet ==
This species feeds on a sponge.
