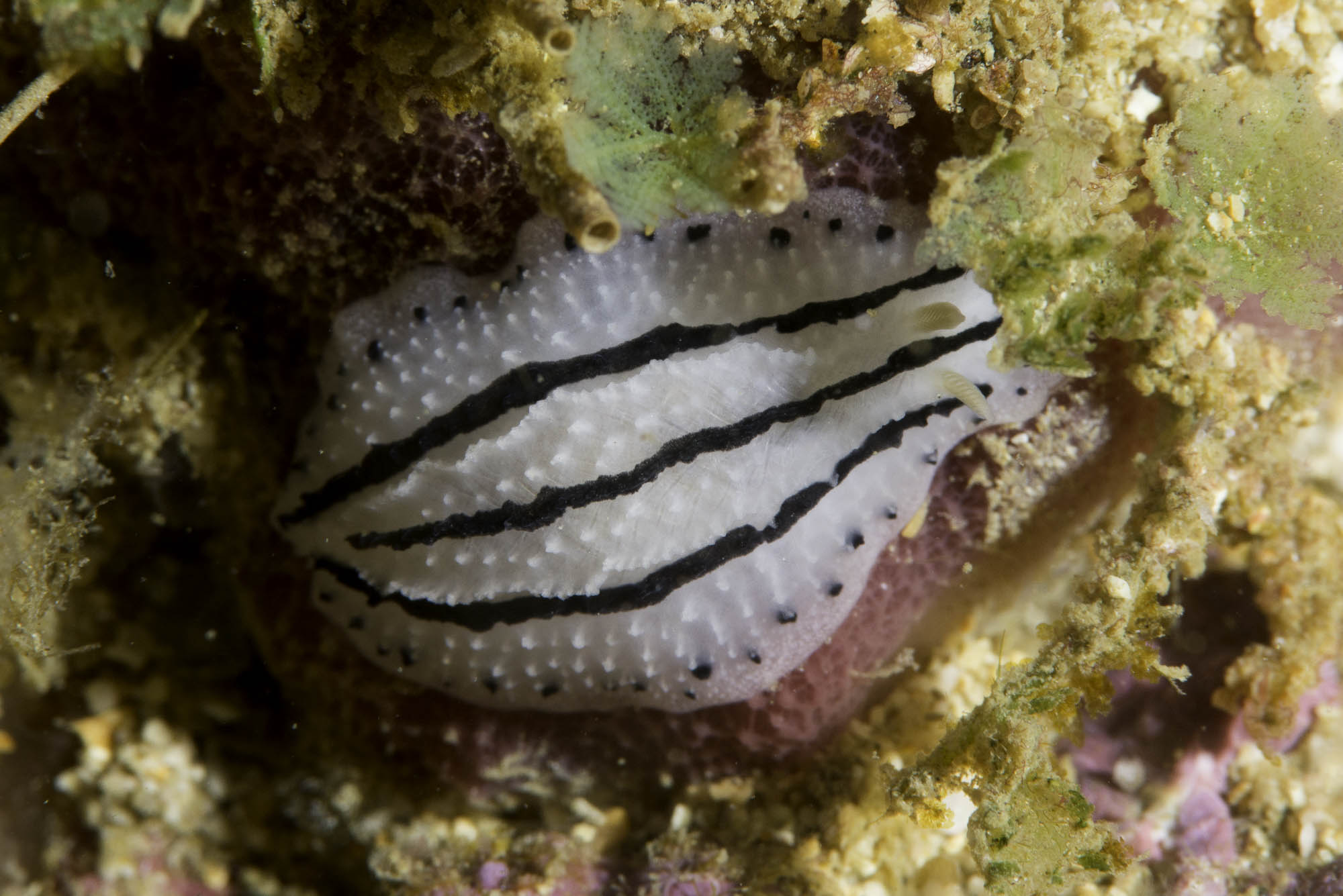
- The nudibranch Phyllidiopsis phiphiensis, Mirissa, Sri Lanka.

Scientific classification
- Kingdom: Animalia
- Phylum: Mollusca
- Class: Gastropoda
- Order: Nudibranchia
- Family: Phyllidiidae
- Genus: Phyllidiopsis
- Species: P. phiphiensis

Binomial name
- Phyllidiopsis phiphiensis Brunckhorst, 1993

= Phyllidiopsis phiphiensis =

Species of gastropod

Phyllidiopsis phiphiensis is a species of sea slug, a dorid nudibranch, a shell-less marine gastropod mollusk in the family Phyllidiidae.

== Distribution ==
This species was described from Phi Phi Island, southern Thailand. It has been reported from Myanmar, Sri Lanka and India, Kenya and the Maldives.

== Description ==
This nudibranch has a white dorsum with three longitudinal black lines interspersed with two raised ridges. It is a small Phyllidiid, growing to about 15 mm in length. There are black spots bordering the edge of the mantle. The rhinophores are white. It is similar to Phyllidiopsis xishaensis and Phyllidiopsis annae but has three instead of four longitudinal black lines on the mantle and different coloured rhinophores to Phyllidiopsis annae, which are black in that species.

== Diet ==
This species feeds on a sponge belonging to the genus Gellius.
