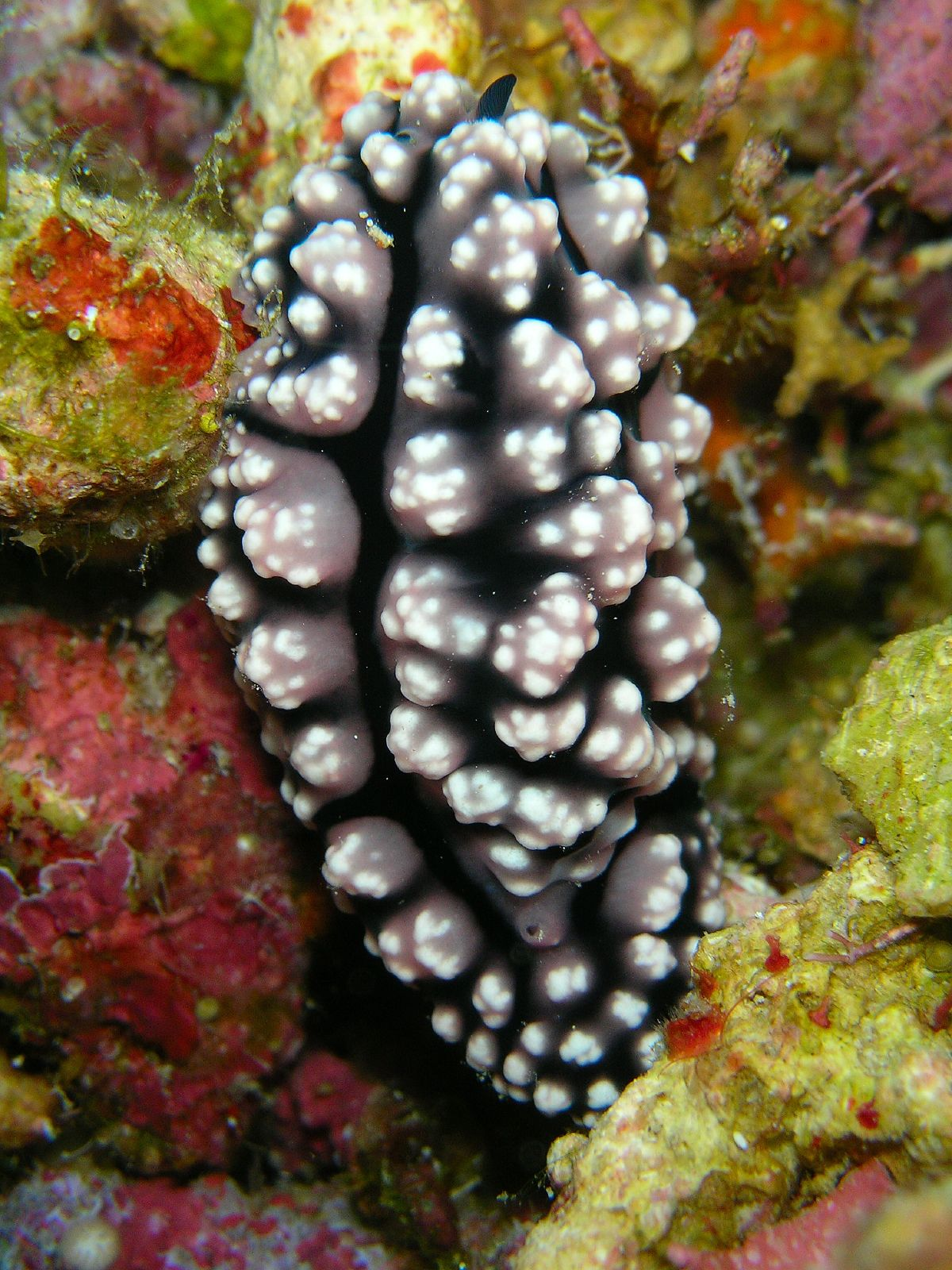
- Phyllidiopsis fissurata, head end at the top

Scientific classification
- Kingdom: Animalia
- Phylum: Mollusca
- Class: Gastropoda
- Order: Nudibranchia
- Family: Phyllidiidae
- Genus: Phyllidiopsis
- Species: P. fissurata

Binomial name
- Phyllidiopsis fissurata Brunckhorst, 1993

= Phyllidiopsis fissurata =

Species of gastropod

Phyllidiopsis fissurata is a species of sea slug, specifically a dorid nudibranch, a shell-less marine gastropod mollusk in the family Phyllidiidae.

== Distribution ==
Phyllidiopsis fissurata has been noted at the Great Barrier Reef, Fiji, and Lord Howe Island. Sometimes this nudibranch is found in Hawaii. This species is distributed throughout the central and western Pacific.

== Description ==
Phyllidiopsis fissurata is approximately 5-8 centimeters long. The dorsal surface of the body has a black background with many tall, pink, tubercles. The rhinophores are black tipped and pink. There is a black line on the posterior edge of the rhinophores, which have a semitransparent film raised around them. The anal region is a smooth, tall, raised pink papilla.

== Bibliography ==
- Coleman, N. (2001). 1001 nudibranchs, catalogue of Indo-Pacific sea slugs, 144 pp. Neville Coleman’s Underwater Geographic Pty. Ltd.
- Debelius, H. (1996). Nudibranchs and sea snails Indo-Pacific field guide, 321 pp. IKAN - Unterwasserarchiv.
- Marshall, J. G., & Richard C. Willan. (1999). Nudibranchs of Heron Island, Great Barrier Reef. A survey of the Opisthobranchia (sea slugs) of Heron and Wistari Reefs, x + 257 pp. Backhuys Publishers, Leiden.
- Masuda, Hajime. (1999). Guide book to marine life, xi + 404pp. Tokai University Press. [Nudibranchia pp. 89–136; in Japanese]
- Nakano, Rie. (2004). Opisthobranchs of Japan Islands, 304 pp. Rutles, Inc. [In Japanese].
- Ono, Atsushi. (1999). Opisthobranchs of Kerama Islands, 184 pp. TBS-Britannica Co., Ltd. [In Japanese].
- Ono, Atsushi. ( 2004). Opisthobranchs of Ryukyu Islands, 304 pp. Rutles, Inc. [In Japanese].
