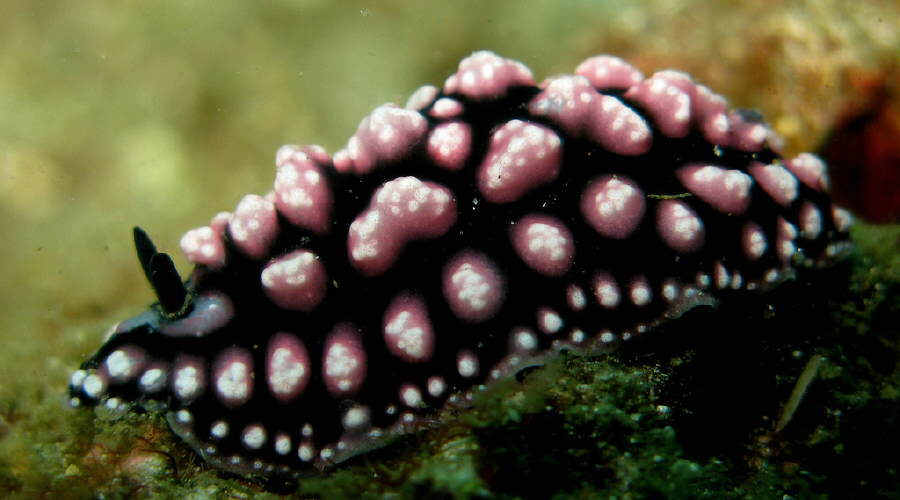
- Phyllidiopsis burni Brunckhorst, 1993, Kasawari, North Sulawesi, Indonesia

Scientific classification
- Kingdom: Animalia
- Phylum: Mollusca
- Class: Gastropoda
- Order: Nudibranchia
- Family: Phyllidiidae
- Genus: Phyllidiopsis
- Species: P. burni

Binomial name
- Phyllidiopsis burni Brunckhorst, 1993

= Phyllidiopsis burni =

Species of gastropod

Phyllidiopsis burni is a species of sea slug, a dorid nudibranch, a shell-less marine gastropod mollusk in the family Phyllidiidae.

== Distribution ==
This species was described from Guam. It has been reported from Micronesia and the Great Barrier Reef.

== Description ==
This nudibranch has a black dorsum with white-capped, pink, compound tubercles. The edge of the mantle is translucent pink. It is a large Phyllidiid, growing to 61 mm in length. In overall appearance this species resembles Phyllidiella pustulosa but can be distinguished by the compound nature of the tubercles and the fused oral tentacles.

== Diet ==
This species feeds on a sponge.
