= Phyllidiopsis blanca =

Scientific classification
- Kingdom: Animalia
- Phylum: Mollusca
- Class: Gastropoda
- Order: Nudibranchia
- Family: Phyllidiidae
- Genus: Phyllidiopsis
- Species: P. blanca

Binomial name
- Phyllidiopsis blanca Gosliner & Behrens, 1988

Species of gastropod

Phyllidiopsis blanca is a species of sea slug, a dorid nudibranch, a shell-less marine gastropod mollusk in the family Phyllidiidae.

== Distribution ==
This species was described from San Nicolas Island, San Francisco, United States with additional specimens from Isla San Benitos, Baja California, Mexico. It is a rare species which has also been recorded from Palos Verdes and San Pedro.

== Description ==
This nudibranch has a white dorsum with simple tubercles. It is a medium-sized Phyllidiid, growing to at least 25 mm in length.

== Diet ==
This species feeds on the sponge Hymenamphiastra cyanocrypta.
