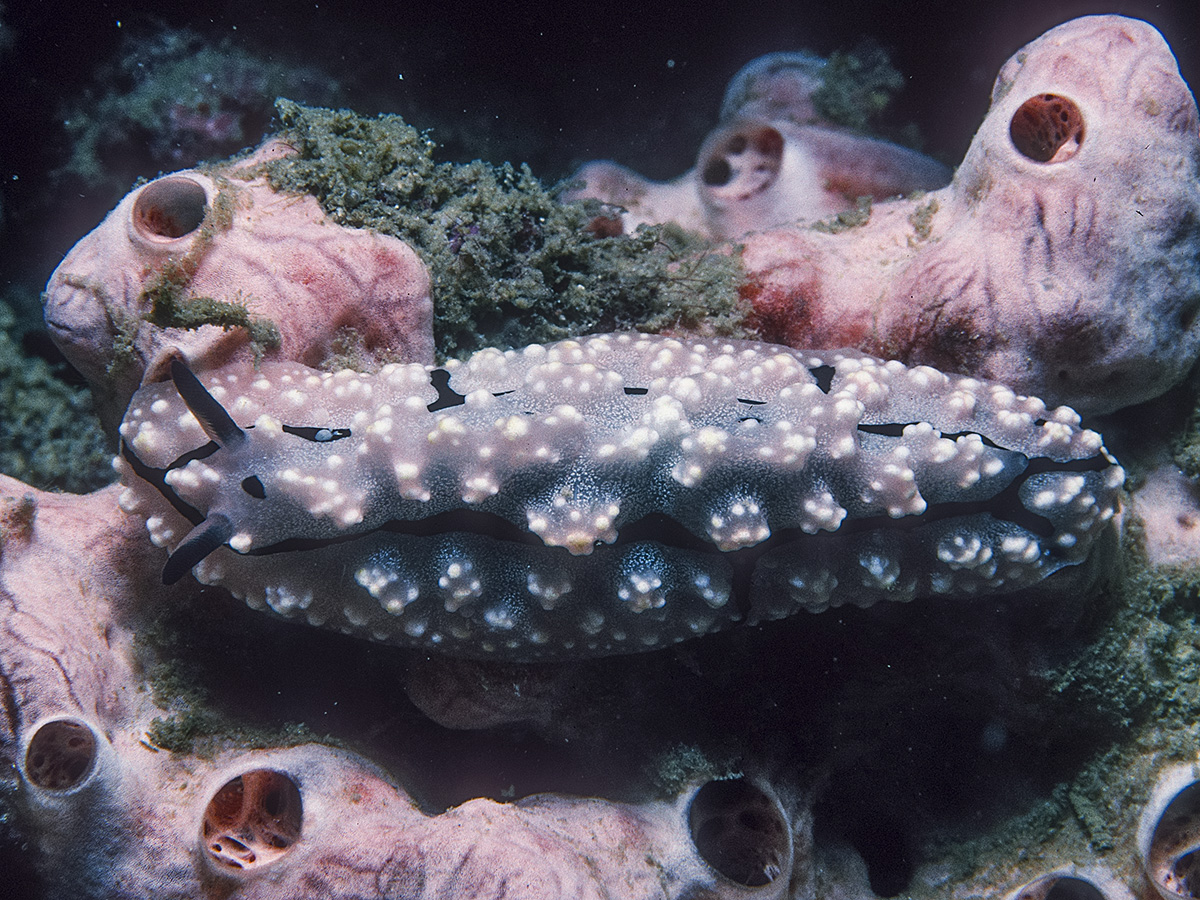
- Phyllidiopsis pipeki, Pemuteran, Bali.

Scientific classification
- Kingdom: Animalia
- Phylum: Mollusca
- Class: Gastropoda
- Order: Nudibranchia
- Family: Phyllidiidae
- Genus: Phyllidiopsis
- Species: P. pipeki

Binomial name
- Phyllidiopsis pipeki Brunckhorst, 1993

= Phyllidiopsis pipeki =

Species of gastropod

Phyllidiopsis pipeki is a species of sea slug, a dorid nudibranch, a shell-less marine gastropod mollusk in the family Phyllidiidae.

== Distribution ==
The type specimen of this species was described from Madang, Papua New Guinea. The original description included numerous specimens from Madang, the Philippines, the Great Barrier Reef and the Coral Sea. It has been reported from Fiji; Sulawesi and Bali, Indonesia.

== Description ==
This nudibranch has a translucent dorsum with fine white or pink stippling and two longitudinal black lines. There are a few radiating black lines at right angles to the longitudinal lines and a Y-shaped line at the front of the head. It is a large Phyllidiid, growing to about 85 mm in length. The rhinophores are black at the tips with a pink area on the frontal surfaces. It is similar to Phyllidiopsis krempfi.

== Diet ==
This species feeds on a sponge.
