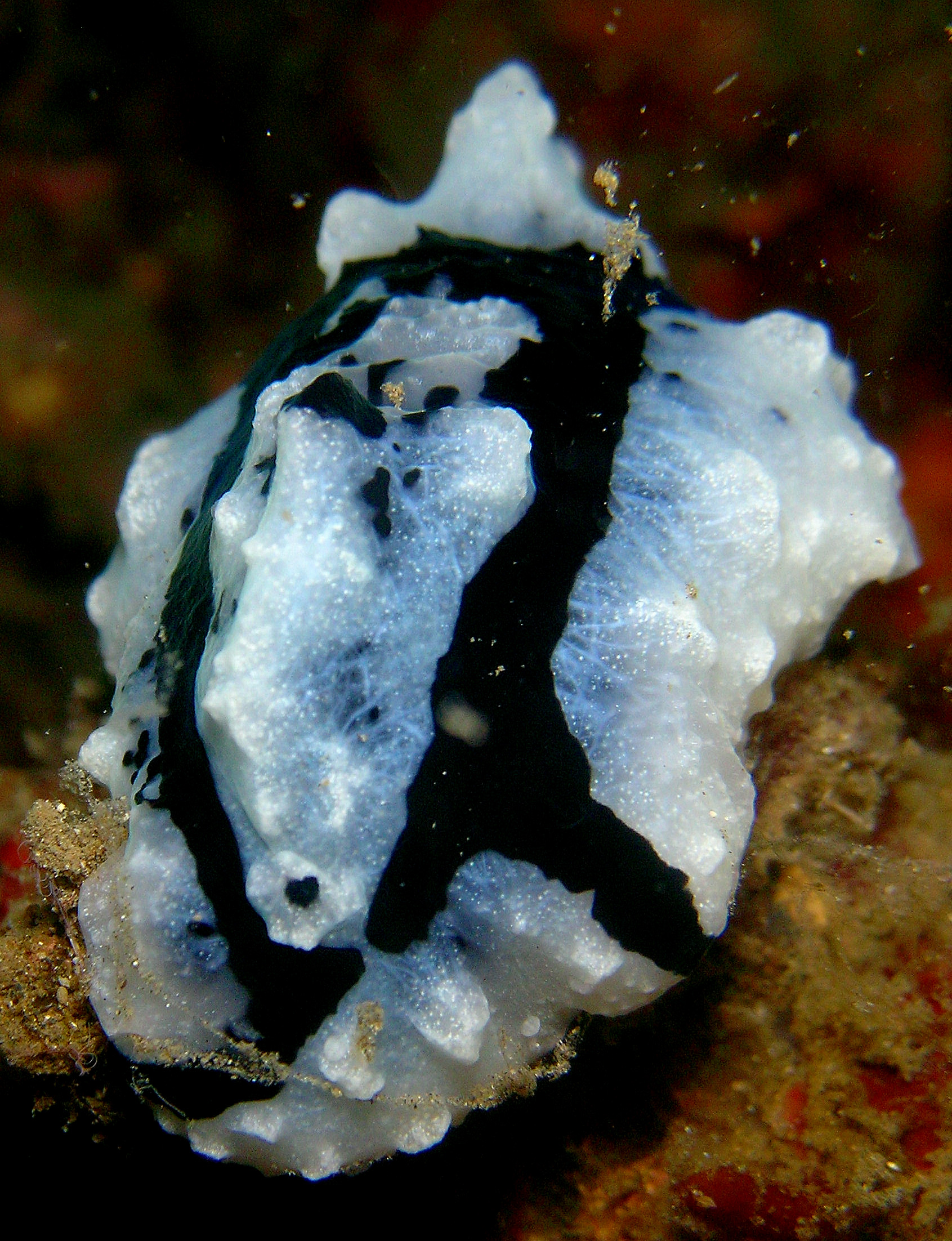
- Phyllidiopsis shireenae

Scientific classification
- Kingdom: Animalia
- Phylum: Mollusca
- Class: Gastropoda
- Order: Nudibranchia
- Family: Phyllidiidae
- Genus: Phyllidiopsis
- Species: P. shireenae

Binomial name
- Phyllidiopsis shireenae Brunckhorst, 1990

= Phyllidiopsis shireenae =

Species of gastropod

Phyllidiopsis shireenae is a species of sea slug, a dorid nudibranch, a shell-less marine gastropod mollusk in the family Phyllidiidae of the order Doridida. Its common names are Shireen’s Phyllidiopsis, Shireen’s Phyllidiopsis Sea Slug, Shirin Sea Slug, and Crested Wart Slug.

It was first described by Brunckhorst in 1990 from specimens collected in the tropical western Pacific. Like other members of the Phyllidiidae family, it is characterized by its firm, flattened body with raised dorsal tubercles, a lack of dorsal gills, an absent radula associated with sponge-feeding behavior, and brightly colored bodies. The species can be distinguished from related taxa by its dorsal morphology and salmon pink rhinophore coloration. P. shireenae is distributed across the Indo-Pacific region and is typically associated with coral reef habitats.

== Taxonomy ==
Phyllidiopsis shireenae was formally described by Brunckhorst (1990) as a part of a revision of the genus Phyllidiopsis, a group of dorid nudibranchs characterized by their dorsal tubercles and reduced internal anatomy. The species belongs to the phylum Mollusca and class Gastropoda, within the order Doridida, part of the superorder Nudipleura, and the family Phyllidiidae. Members of this family are sponge-feeding nudibranchs that lack a radula and dorsal gills and instead use a specialized suctorial feeding apparatus.

Recent taxonomic studies have confirmed the placement of P. shireenae within the genus Phyllidiopsis and identified which traits distinguish them from closely related species, including their mid-dorsal crest and rhinophore coloration. Scientists have further confirmed the placement and history of P. shireenae through molecular phylogeny studies and through examining their chemical ecology. P. shireenae has been differentiated from other species both morphologically and phylogenetically.

== Description ==
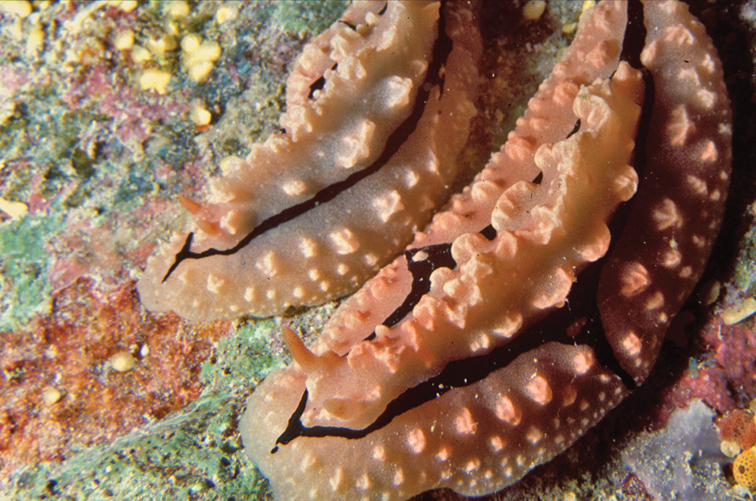
Dorsal view of P. shireenae. Shows tubercles and coloration.

Phyllidiopsis shireenae exhibits the characteristic morphology of phyllidiid nudibranchs, with a firm, elongate body. It is covered in rounded, angular tubercles on its dorsal surface, giving them the nickname Wart nudibranchs. Their overall coloration can be pale pink, white, or grey. They have dark colored markings and a bluish undertone. The dark colored markings are usually black lines that run longitudinally along their bodies. Their coloration and patterns can be used as a defense mechanism called aposematic signaling which warns predators of toxicity.

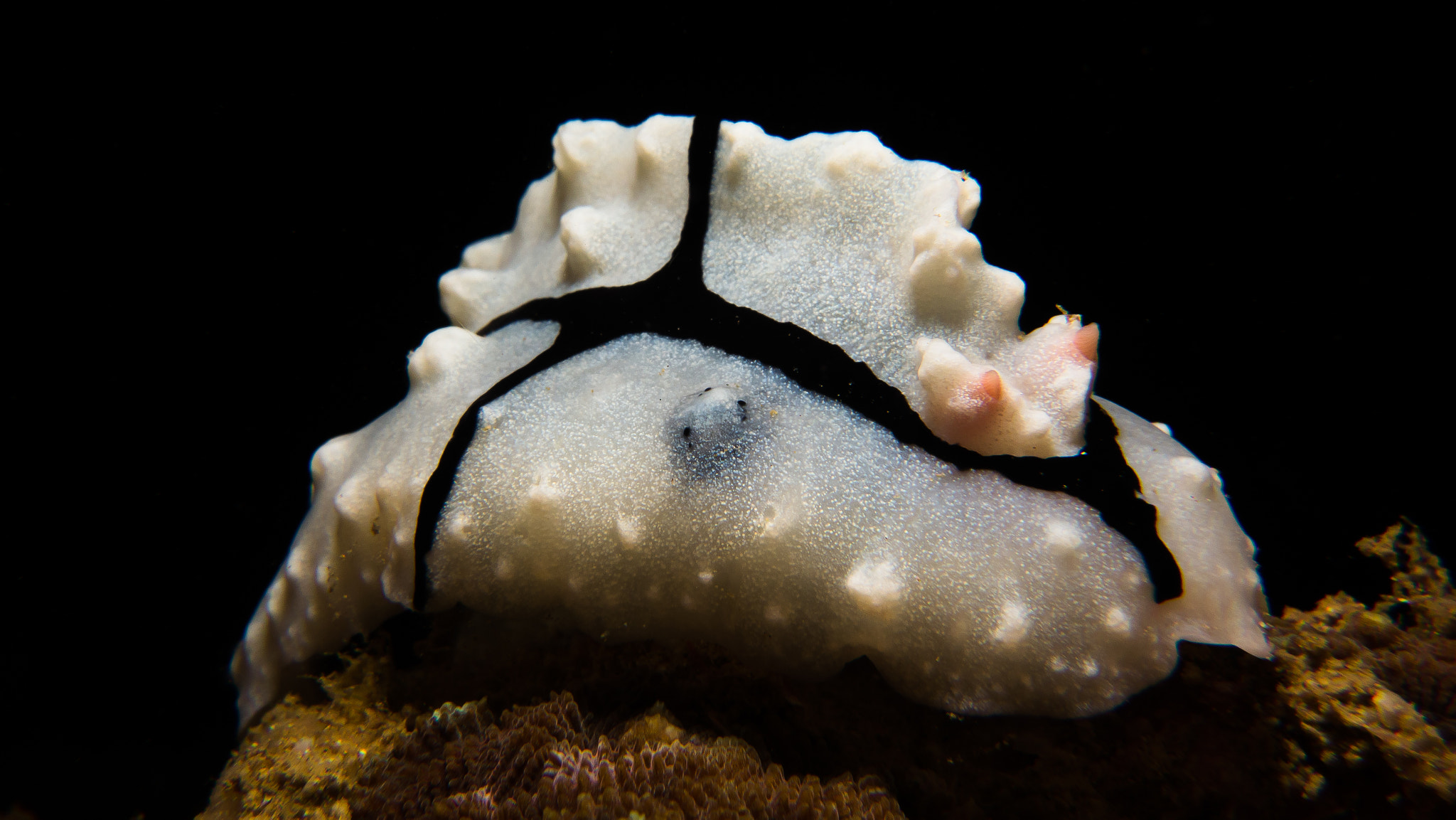
P. shireenae rhinophores. Salmon-pink coloration.

P. shireenae has chemosensory organs including rhinophores and lamellate structures. Rhinophores are the sensory organs located on a nudibranch’s head. P. shireenae is distinguished from other species by the salmon-pink color of their rhinophores. Their lamellate structures help them to detect food and mates, and to sense chemicals in their environment. P. shireenae has a thick body and mantle and their ventral surface is adapted to support them crawling along reef substrates. Phyllidiopsis shireenae is characterized by their high mid-dorsal crest.

Like other members of Phyllidiidae, P. shireenae are specialized sponge-feeders which is why they lack a radula. Instead, they feed on sponges using external digestion and suction with a specialized feeding apparatus and muscular pharynx. They also lack dorsal gills. Phyllidiidae are distinct from other dorid nudibranchs because they have secondary gill leaflets under the mantle.

== Distribution and habitat ==
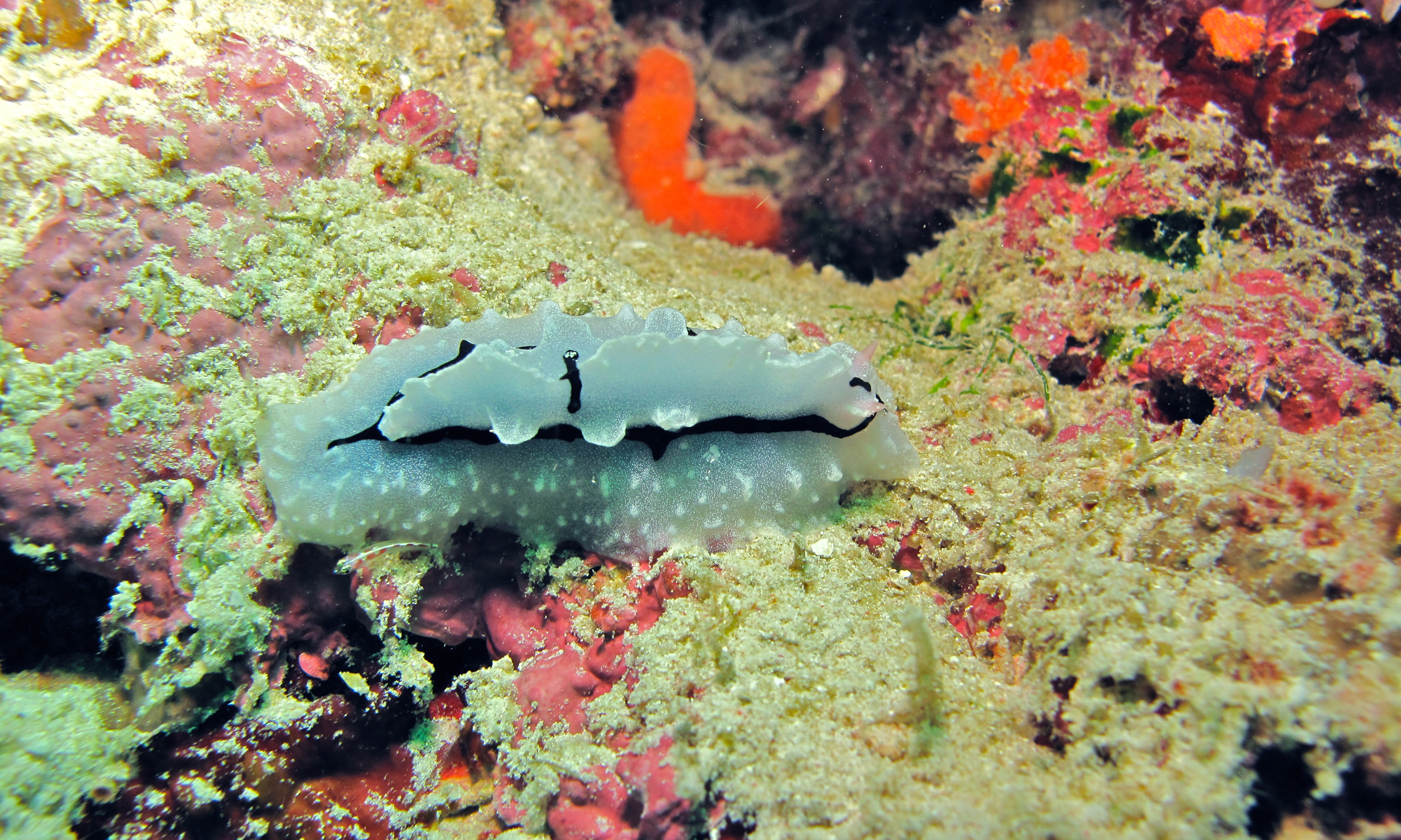
P. shireenae in coral reef habitat.

Phyllidiopsis shireenae is found in tropical regions in the Indo-Pacific. There have been documented sightings in Indonesia, the Philippines, India, and East Africa. Specifically, the species lives in coral reef ecosystems in tropical marine regions. They have been recorded on reef substrates including sponges and bryozoans.

P. shireenae has a varying depth range and can be found in shallow waters and subtidal zones as well as in moderately deep depths. It is thought that their depth is dependent on environmental conditions and prey availability. Phyllidiids are often found on or near sponges.

== Ecology ==
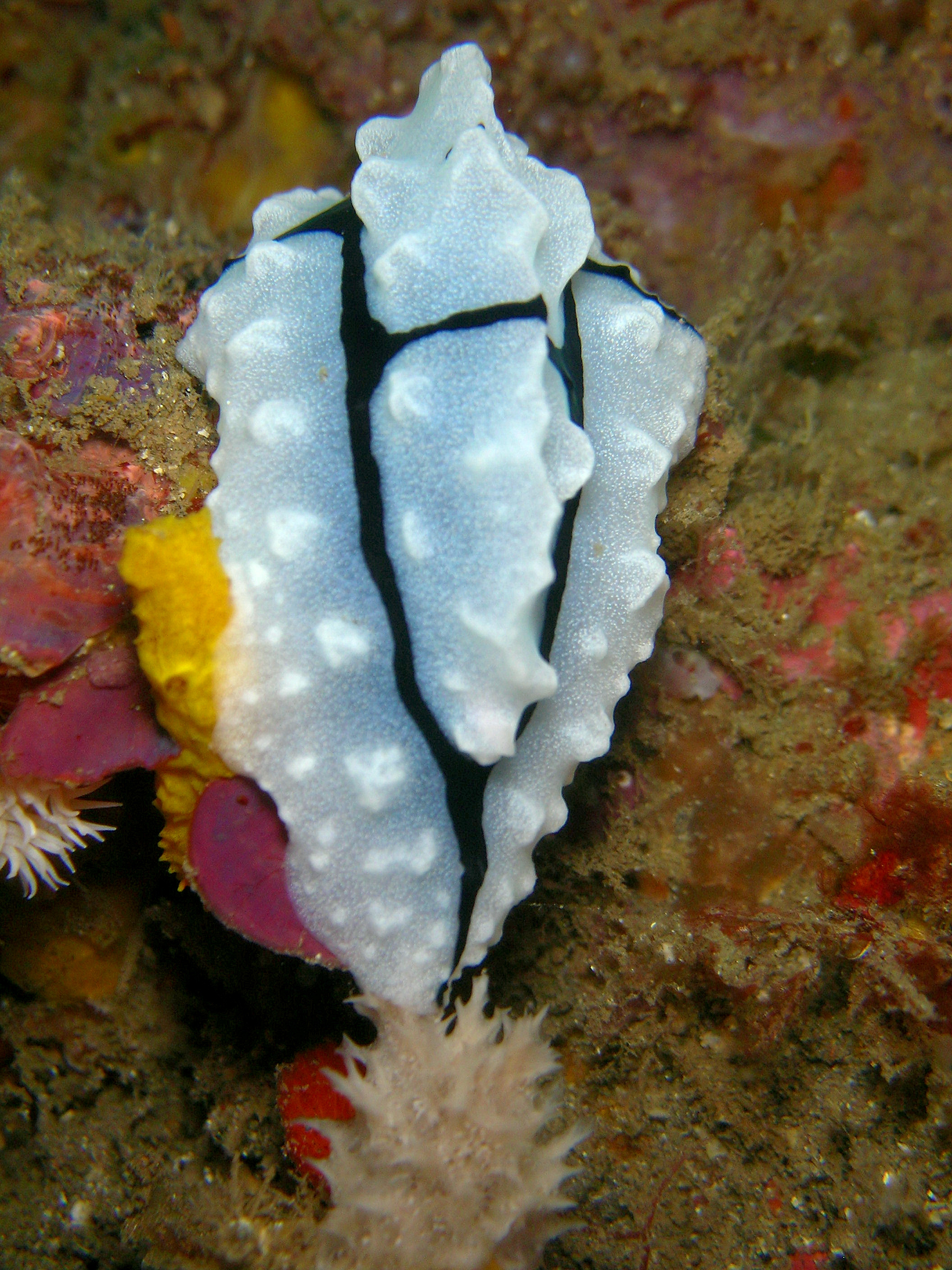
P. shireenae on substrate with sponge prey.

Phyllidiopsis shireenae are spongivorous and have a specialized feeding method. They feed on sponges, consistent with all Phyllidiids. P. shireenae has a modified foregut and uses external digestion and suction to feed. They release digestive fluids to soften the sponge and then suck the softened tissue which is pumped into their muscular pharynx. This specialized feeding strategy contributes to nutrient cycling and benefits coral reef ecosystems.

P. shireenae is considered to be an indicator of marine biodiversity in Indonesia and other regions. High species diversity is crucial to ecotourism and ecological stability. The species can be indicators of coral reef ecosystem health because of their sensitivity to changes in environmental conditions like pollution, temperature, and disturbances.

== Chemical ecology ==
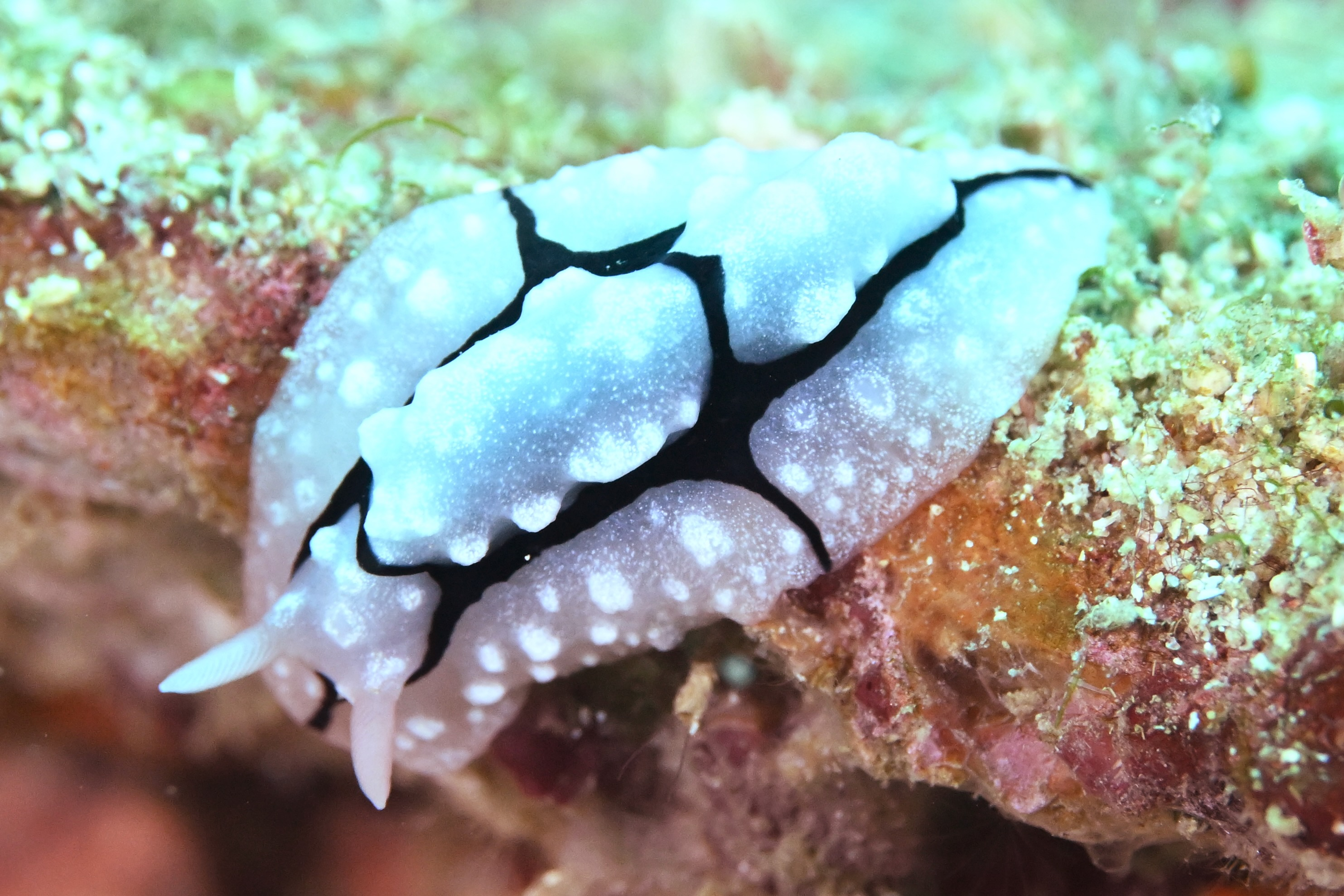
P. shireenae bright coloration.

Phyllidiopsis shireenae protect themselves by utilizing chemical defenses and bright coloration as deterrents. Bioactive compounds can be produced from symbiotic microorganisms in sponges which P. shireenae and other species in the group can accumulate. When P. shireenae and other members of Phyllidiidae feed on noxious sponges, they take in chemicals from them and store these compounds in their tissues. They can modify these chemical compounds to use as defense, producing odorous secretions that can be lethal to crustaceans and fish.

In addition to obtaining toxic compounds through feeding on sponges, research has found that Phyllidiids can possess symbiotic bacteria that creates bioactive compounds which can be used for defense. The symbiotic bacteria in Phyllidiopsis shireenae can help protect the organisms by making them toxic or foul-tasting to predators and helping to fight infections.

Phyllidiids, including P. shireenae, also use their thick bodies as defense because they have a mass of spicules for support which makes it difficult for predators to eat them.

Phyllidiopsis shireenae has a bright coloration, which serves as a warning to predators, a process called aposematic signaling.

== Phylogeny and evolution ==
Phylogeny studies have furthered the understanding of how species in Phyllidiidae are related and how they evolved using DNA. Species in Phyllidiopsis can look similar, but DNA studies have clarified which species are closely related or not despite morphology.

DNA studies including P. shireenae have confirmed where they belong in the phylogenetic tree. Phylogeny studies have also clarified the evolutionary history of P. shireenae and linked evolutionary relationships between P. shireenae and other species in Phyllidiopsis.

Species in Phyllidiopsis evolved differently based on environmental factors which affect depth, prey, and coloration. P. shireenae and other species in the genus use niche differentiation to avoid competition with close relatives.
