= Phyllidiopsis bayi =

Scientific classification
- Kingdom: Animalia
- Phylum: Mollusca
- Class: Gastropoda
- Order: Nudibranchia
- Family: Phyllidiidae
- Genus: Phyllidiopsis
- Species: P. bayi

Binomial name
- Phyllidiopsis bayi (Bouchet, 1983)

Synonyms
- Fryeria bayi Bouchet, 1983

Species of gastropod

Phyllidiopsis bayi is a species of sea slug, a dorid nudibranch, a shell-less marine gastropod mollusk in the family Phyllidiidae.

== Distribution ==
This species was described from 38 m depth at Point La Revellata, Punta Bianca, Corsica 42.584°N 8.728°E.

== Description ==
This nudibranch has a translucent white dorsum with brown flecks of pigment. It is a small Phyllidiid, growing to 8 mm in length, although the specimens were immature and the maximum size is unknown.

== Diet ==
This species feeds on a sponge.
