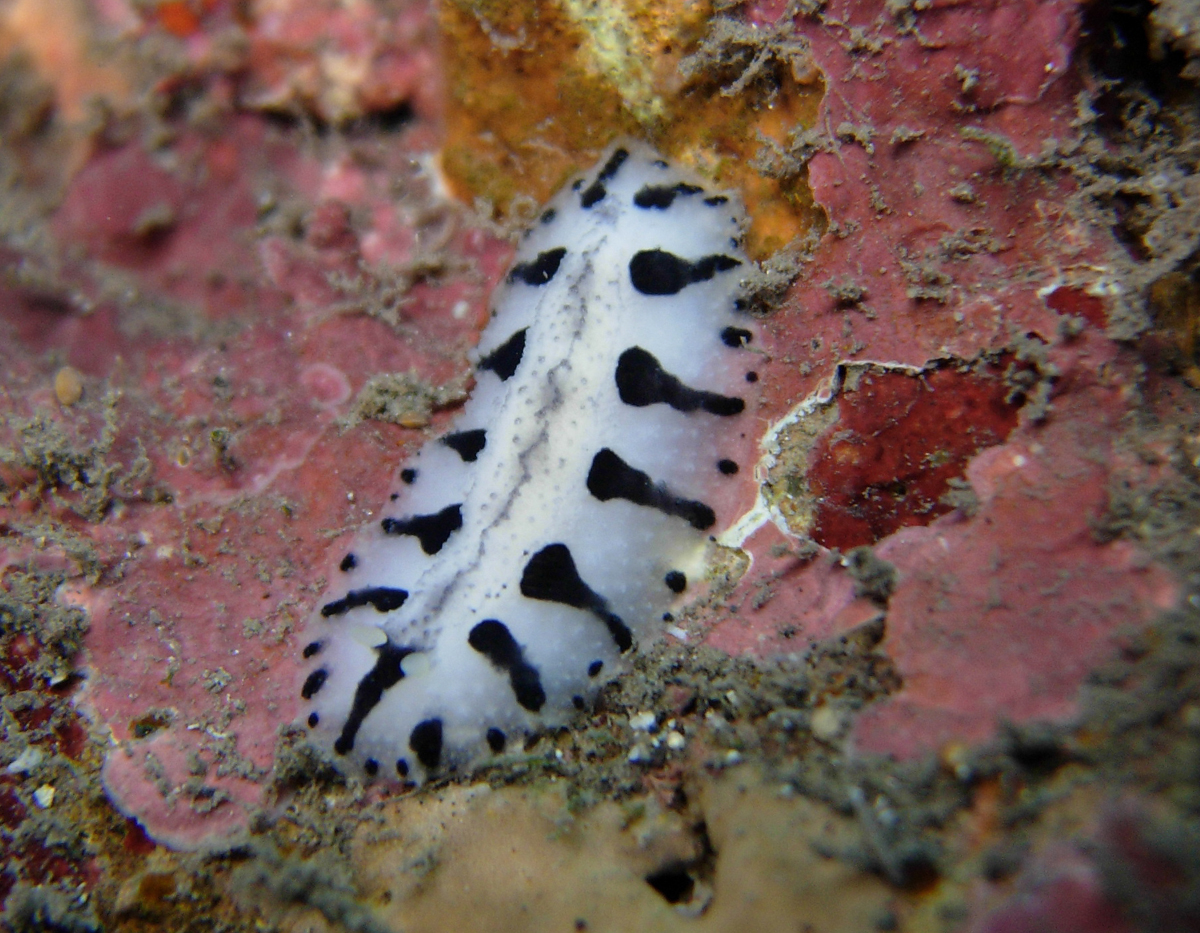
- Phyllidiopsis loricata

Scientific classification
- Kingdom: Animalia
- Phylum: Mollusca
- Class: Gastropoda
- Order: Nudibranchia
- Family: Phyllidiidae
- Genus: Phyllidiopsis
- Species: P. loricata

Binomial name
- Phyllidiopsis loricata (Bergh, 1873)

= Phyllidiopsis loricata =

Species of gastropod

Phyllidiopsis loricata is a species of sea slug, a dorid nudibranch, a shell-less marine gastropod mollusk in the family Phyllidiidae.

== Distribution ==
This species was described from Tahiti. It has been reported from the Great Barrier Reef, Timor Sea (northern Australia), Guam, the Marshall Islands and Enewetok Atoll. Specimens from Réunion in the Indian Ocean may be a different species.

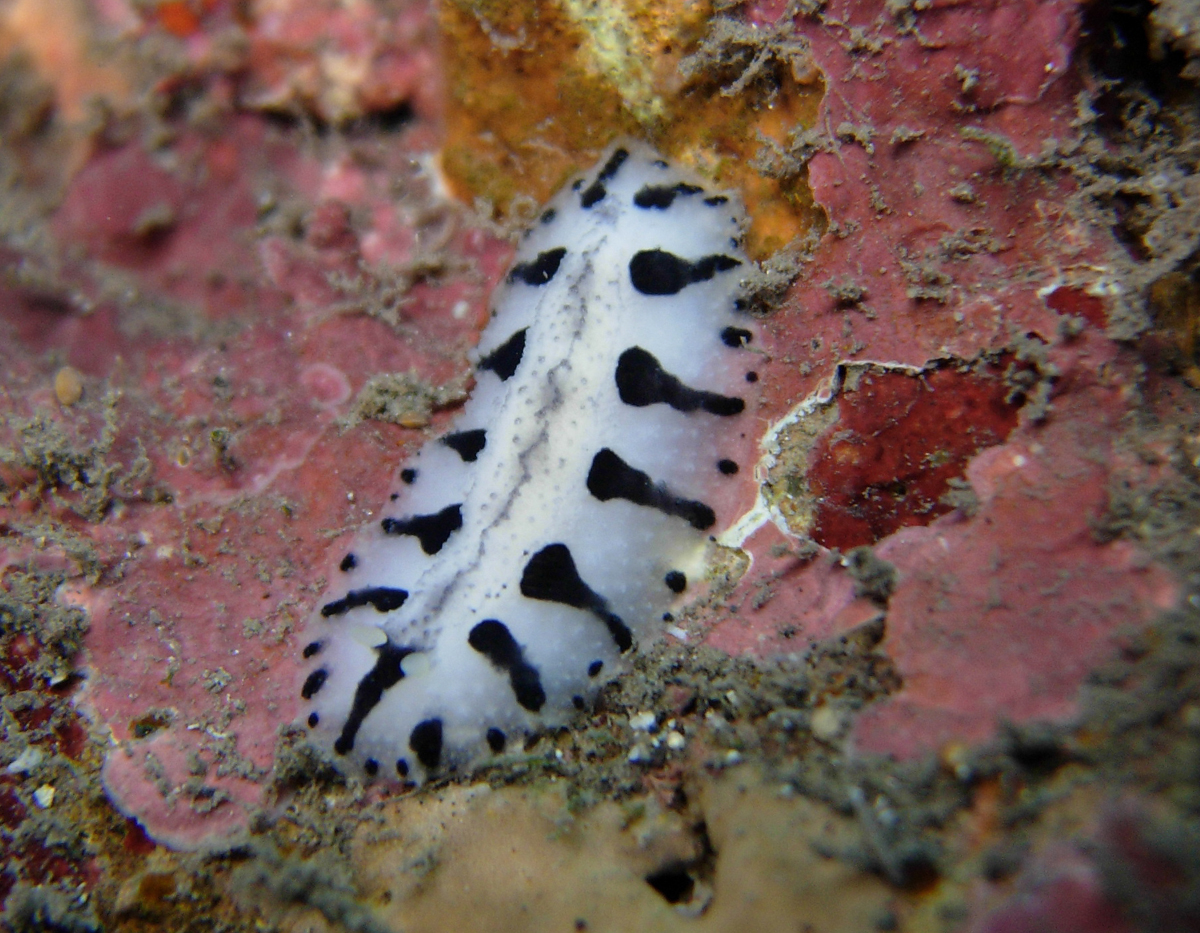
Phyllidiopsis cf. loricata from Réunion

== Description ==
This nudibranch has a white dorsum with rounded black spots in a single row along both sides of the body, with a spot at the front, in front of the white rhinophores, and a similar spot at the back of the mantle. It is a moderately large Phyllidiid, growing to about 40 mm in length. It is similar to Phyllidia scottjohnsoni but that species has black spots along the midline of the back. It is possible that there are several undescribed species with similar coloration.

== Diet ==
This species feeds on a white sponge.
