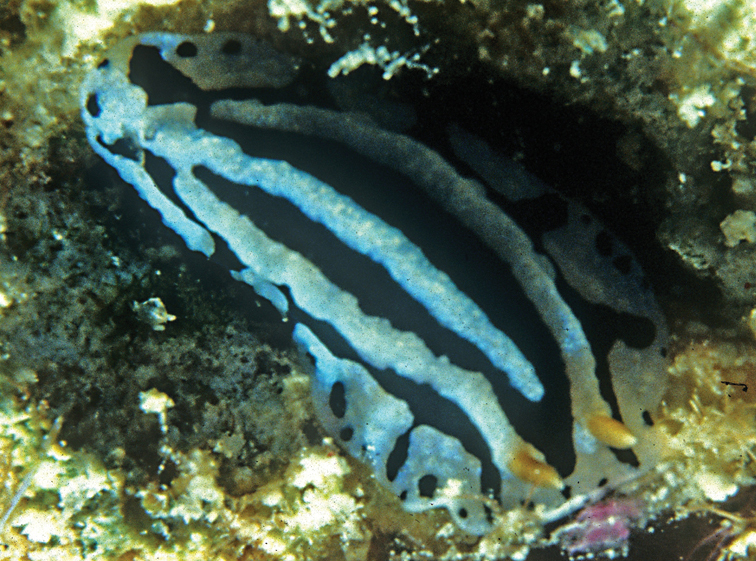
- Phyllidiopsis sphingis

Scientific classification
- Kingdom: Animalia
- Phylum: Mollusca
- Class: Gastropoda
- Order: Nudibranchia
- Family: Phyllidiidae
- Genus: Phyllidiopsis
- Species: P. sphingis

Binomial name
- Phyllidiopsis sphingis Brunckhorst, 1993

= Phyllidiopsis sphingis =

Species of gastropod

Phyllidiopsis sphingis is a species of sea slug, a dorid nudibranch, a shell-less marine gastropod mollusk in the family Phyllidiidae.

== Distribution ==
This species was described from Pupukea, Oahu, Hawaii. It has been reported from Papua New Guinea, the Coral Sea, the northern Mariana Islands and the Philippines.

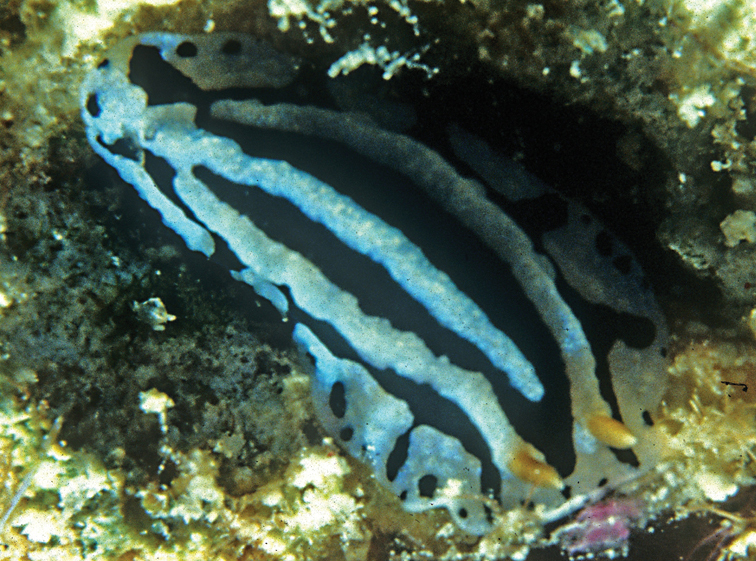
Phyllidiopsis sphingis.

== Description ==
This nudibranch has a white dorsum grading to blue at the edges. There are four longitudinal black lines interspersed with three raised ridges. The outer black lines have extensions at right angles which radiate out towards the edge of the mantle. These lines are interspersed with spots or short lines. It is a small Phyllidiid, growing to about 25 mm in length. The rhinophores are white.

== Diet ==
This species feeds on a sponge.
