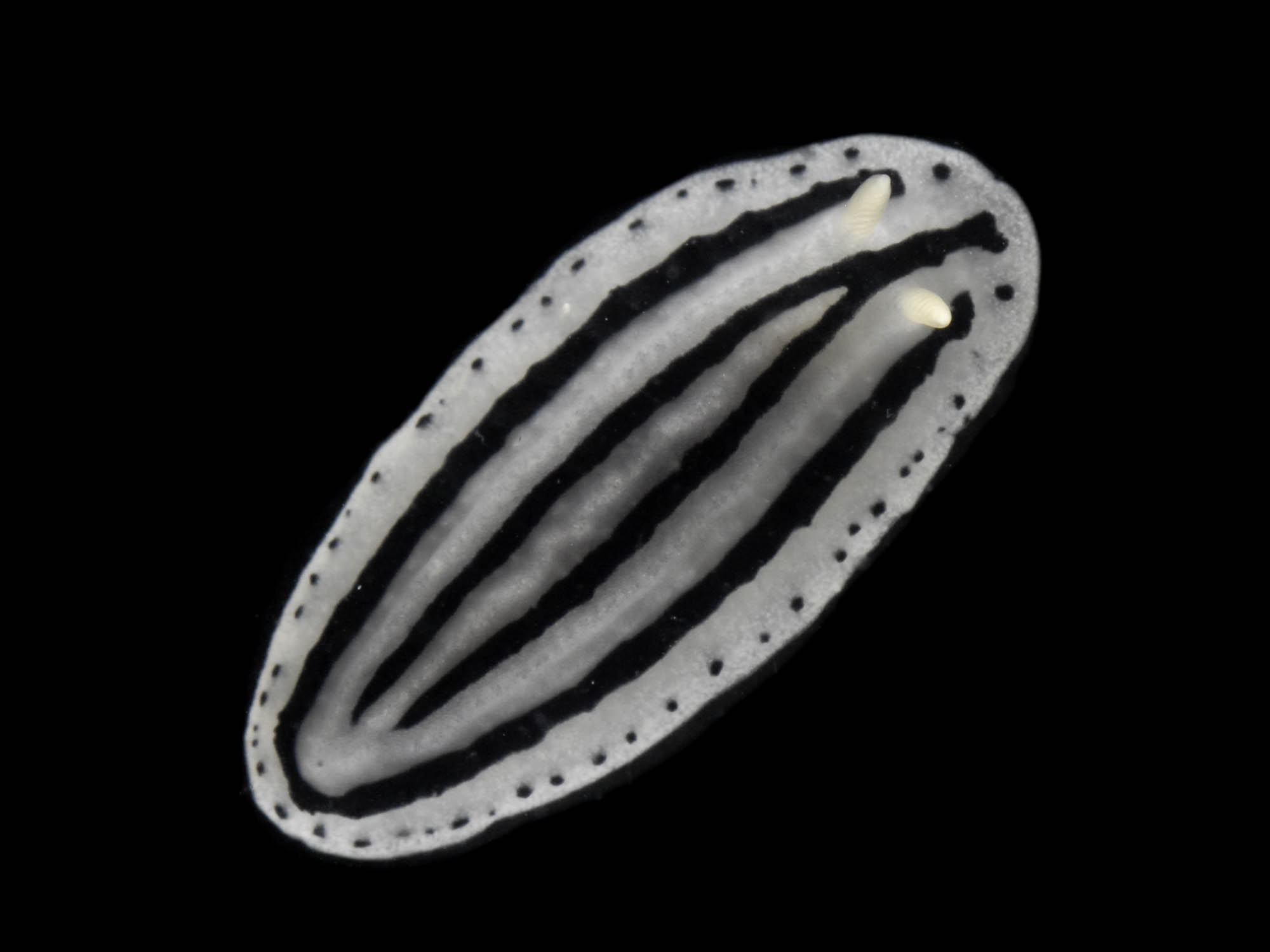
- The nudibranch Phyllidiopsis xishaensis, Diani Beach, Kenya.

Scientific classification
- Domain: Eukaryota
- Kingdom: Animalia
- Phylum: Mollusca
- Class: Gastropoda
- Order: Nudibranchia
- Superfamily: Phyllidioidea
- Family: Phyllidiidae
- Genus: Phyllidiopsis
- Species: P. xishaensis

Binomial name
- Phyllidiopsis xishaensis (Lin, 1983)

Synonyms
- Phyllidia xishaensis Lin, 1983 Phyllidiopsis striata auctt. non Bergh, 1888

= Phyllidiopsis xishaensis =

Species of gastropod

Phyllidiopsis xishaensis is a species of sea slug, a dorid nudibranch, a shell-less marine gastropod mollusk in the family Phyllidiidae.

Frequently misidentified as Phyllidiopsis striata but that species has been shown to be a completely different animal, a Phyllidiella.

== Distribution ==
This species was described from China. It has been reported from South Africa, Réunion, the Maldives, Malaysia, the Philippines and the Great Barrier Reef, Australia.

== Description ==
This nudibranch has a blue-white dorsum with four longitudinal black lines interspersed with raised ridges. It is a small Phyllidiid, growing to about 20 mm in length. There are sometimes black spots in the region between the outer black lines and the edge of the mantle. The rhinophores are lemon coloured or white. It is similar to Phyllidiopsis annae except for the colour of the rhinophores, which are black in that species. Phyllidiopsis phiphiensis is also similar but has three instead of four longitudinal black lines on the mantle.

== Diet ==
This species feeds on a sponge.
