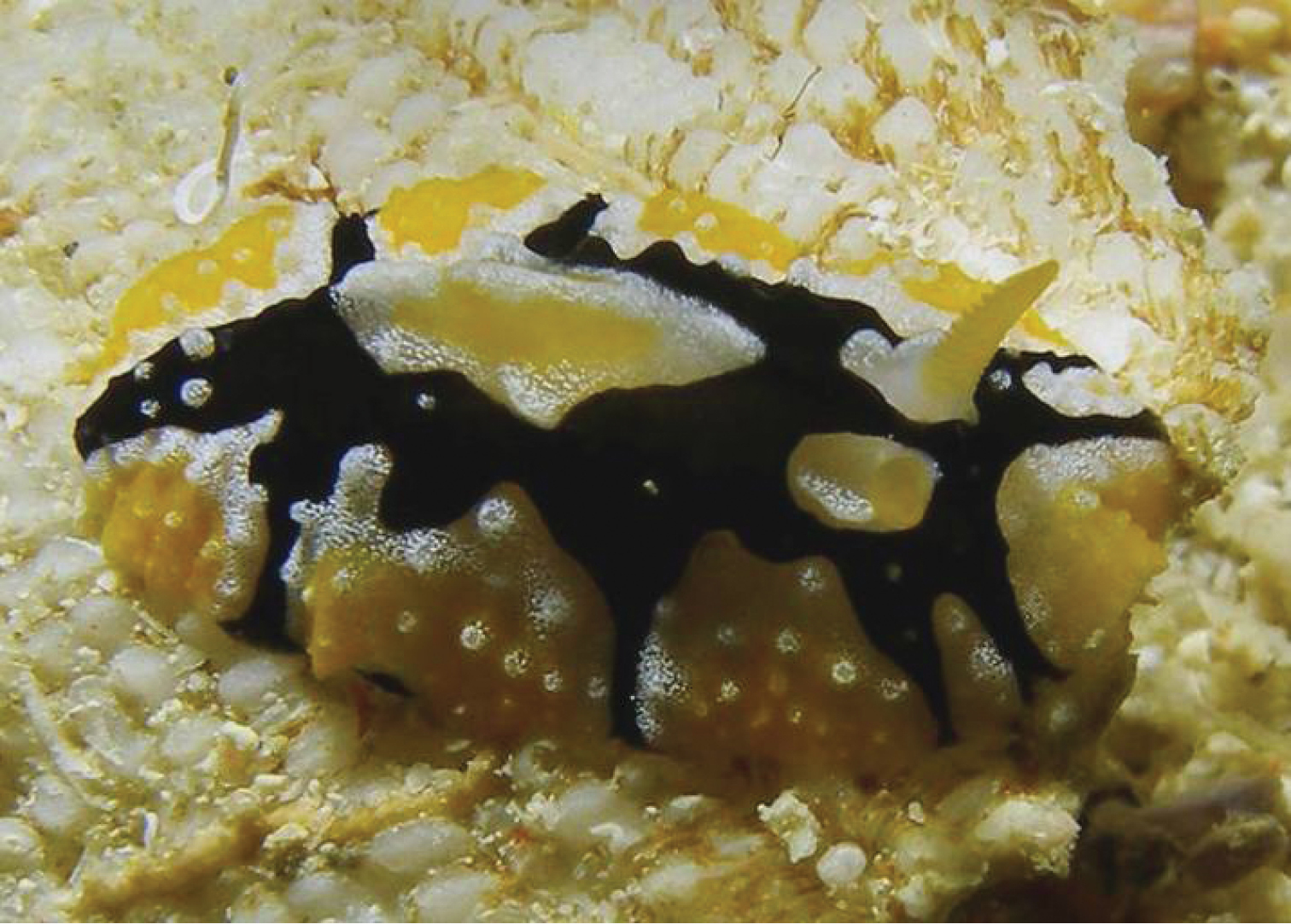

Scientific classification
- Kingdom: Animalia
- Phylum: Mollusca
- Class: Gastropoda
- Order: Nudibranchia
- Family: Phyllidiidae
- Genus: Phyllidia
- Species: P. monacha

Binomial name
- Phyllidia monacha Yonow, 1986

Synonyms
- Phyllidia monacha Yonow, 1986

= Phyllidiopsis monacha =

Species of gastropod

Phyllidia monacha is a species of sea slug, a dorid nudibranch, a shell-less marine gastropod mollusk in the family Phyllidiidae.

== Distribution ==
This species was described from Creek, Jeddah, Red Sea 21°44′N 39°07′E. It is endemic to the Red Sea.

== Description ==
This nudibranch has a white dorsum with a pattern of black and orange. The black pigment forms an irregular ring around the middle of the back with radiating lines extending to the mantle edge. The centre of the back and the edges of the mantle between the black markings have patches of orange-yellow. The rhinophores are also orange-yellow. It is a small Phyllidiid, growing to 20 mm in length.

== Diet ==
This species feeds on a sponge.
