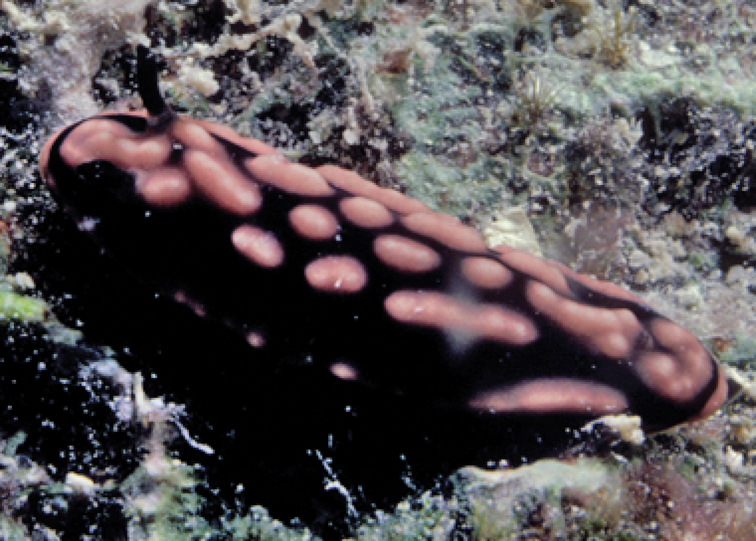

Scientific classification
- Domain: Eukaryota
- Kingdom: Animalia
- Phylum: Mollusca
- Class: Gastropoda
- Order: Nudibranchia
- Superfamily: Phyllidioidea
- Family: Phyllidiidae
- Genus: Phyllidiella
- Species: P. striata

Binomial name
- Phyllidiella striata (Bergh, 1889)

Synonyms
- Phyllidiopsis striata Bergh, 1889

= Phyllidiella striata =

Species of gastropod

Phyllidiella striata is a species of sea slug, a dorid nudibranch, a shell-less marine gastropod mollusc in the family Phyllidiidae. This nudibranch has a black dorsum with longitudinal grey-pink ridges. These ridges are tuberculate and somewhat broken. They form a circle behind the anus and a patch between the rhinophores. The rhinophores are black.

== Description ==
Phyllidiella striata can grow to a length of 35 mm (1.4 in) in length. The rhinophores are black with pink bases and the oral tentacles are pale grey, sometimes streaked with black. The dorsal surface of the body is black, with pink, grey, greenish or bluish tubercles forming longitudinal rows. The front-most tubercles are set obliquely, sloping towards the centre of the back. The ventral surface is a uniform pale grey.

== Distribution ==
Phyllidiella striata occurs in the tropical central and western Pacific Ocean and the Indian Ocean, at depths down to about 50 m (160 ft). This species was first described from the Philippines. This name is often erroneously used for Phyllidiopsis xishaensis.

== Ecology ==
This species feeds on sponges. It has neither a radula, jaws, or a stomach, and feeds by turning part of its gut inside out, using its digestive enzymes to break down the sponge's tissues, and sucking in the liquified product. Like other nudibranchs, Phyllidiella striata is a hermaphrodite. The genital pore is on the right-hand side of the foot just behind the head. A pair of individuals move close to each other while facing in opposite directions, and transfer sperm to each other. Each is then able to produce eggs. There is no larval stage and the embryos undergo direct development into juveniles. This species exudes a milky-white substance containing terpenes from its dorsal gland; this is derived from toxic substances in the sponge it feeds on and acts to deter predators.
