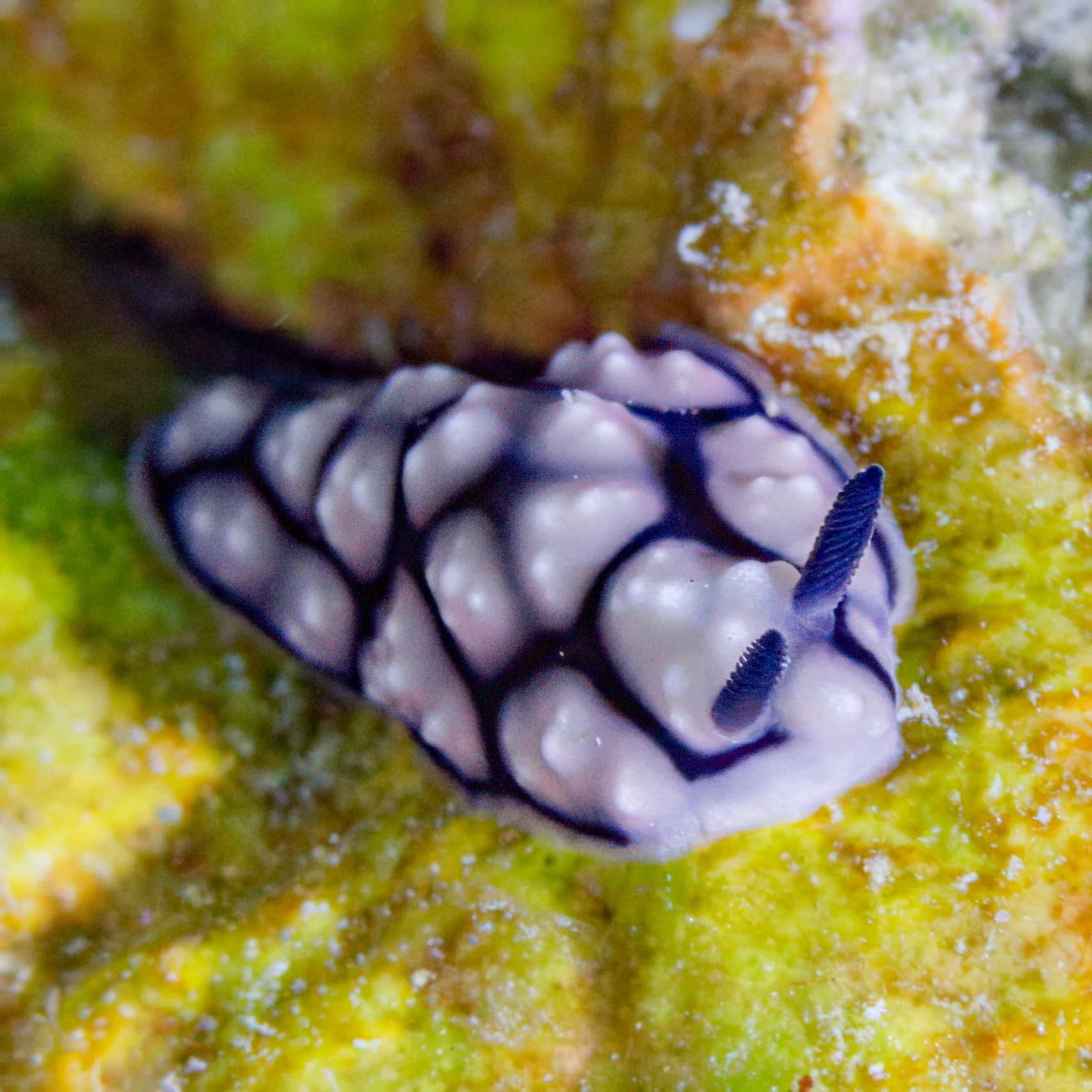
- The nudibranch Phyllidiopsis krempfi, Pemuteran, Bali.

Scientific classification
- Kingdom: Animalia
- Phylum: Mollusca
- Class: Gastropoda
- Order: Nudibranchia
- Family: Phyllidiidae
- Genus: Phyllidiopsis
- Species: P. krempfi

Binomial name
- Phyllidiopsis krempfi Pruvot-Fol, 1957

= Phyllidiopsis krempfi =

Species of gastropod

Phyllidiopsis krempfi is a species of sea slug, a dorid nudibranch, a shell-less marine gastropod mollusk in the family Phyllidiidae. This species was named to honour Armand Krempf, a French marine biologist and director of the Nha Trang Institute of Oceanography (Vietnam) from 1921.

== Distribution ==
This species was described from Nha-Trang, Vietnam.

== Description ==
This nudibranch has a white or pink dorsum with compound tubercles with white apices. It is a large Phyllidiid, growing to at least 60 mm in length. It is similar to Phyllidiopsis pipeki but that species has only two longitudinal black lines on the back.

== Diet ==
This species feeds on a sponge.
