= Nothogeophilus =

Conservation status
- Endangered (IUCN 3.1)

Scientific classification
- Kingdom: Animalia
- Phylum: Arthropoda
- Subphylum: Myriapoda
- Class: Chilopoda
- Order: Geophilomorpha
- Family: Geophilidae
- Genus: Nothogeophilus; Lewis, Jones & Keay, 1988
- Species: N. turki

Binomial name
- Nothogeophilus turki Lewis, Jones & Keay, 1988

Genus of centipede

Nothogeophilus is a monotypic genus of soil centipede in the family Geophilidae. The only species in this genus is Nothogeophilus turki. This centipede is known only from the Isles of Scilly and the Isle of Wight in the British Isles, can reach 13 mm in length, and can feature either 37 or 39 pairs of legs. The International Union for Conservation of Nature lists this species as endangered.

== Discovery ==
This genus and its only species were first described in 1988 by the British myriapodologists John G.E. Lewis, Richard E. Jones, and Andrew N. Keay. They based the original description of this species on an examination of 20 specimens, including 13 females, four males, and two juveniles. The female holotype, the male paratype, and 15 other specimens were found in 1985 on the island of St Mary's in the Isles of Scilly. Another specimen was found in 1985 on the island of Tresco in the Isles of Scilly, and two more were found in 1986 at Freshwater and at Newport on the Isle of Wight. The holotype and paratype are deposited in the Natural History Museum in London.

== Etymology ==
Finding that this centipede fits no known genus, Lewis, Jones, and Keay proposed a new genus, Nothogeophilus, to contain this new species. The name of this genus derives from the Ancient Greek words νόθος (nóthos), meaning 'crossbred', γεω- (geo-), meaning 'earth', and φίλος (phílos), meaning 'lover', and refers to the closely related genus Geophilus. The species is named in honor of the British zoologist Frank A. Turk, who collected a specimen of this centipede from Holy Vale on the island of St Mary's.

== Phylogeny ==
A phylogenetic analysis of the order Geophilomorpha based on morphology and molecular data finds Nothogeophilus nested among species of the family Geophilidae in a phylogenetic tree of this order. Using both morphology and molecular evidence, this analysis places N. turki in a clade with species of the genera Arenophilus, Chomatophilus, Diphyonyx, Geophilus, Stenotaenia, and Tuoba. These species are among the closest relatives of N. turki included in this analysis.

== Distribution ==
This centipede has been recorded only on the Isles of Scilly and the Isle of Wight in the British Isles. There have been no records of this species since its original description in 1988 despite surveys of the Isle of Wight in 2011 and 2012 seeking to rediscover this centipede. A reported sighting from Cornwall in England remains unconfirmed. Authorities suspect that humans may have introduced this centipede to the British Isles along with imports of exotic plants from elsewhere, but the native range of this species remains unknown.

== Habitat ==
This species appears to be limited to coastal areas, with all records within a kilometer of the seashore. Most specimens were collected in soil and under stones near rocky sea cliffs with little vegetation. This centipede has also been found in leaf litter in deciduous woodland on a stream bank as far as 500 meters from the coast on the Isle of St Mary's. One specimen was found in an area of demolished buildings with abundant rubbish, but at a site no more than five meters from the tidal river in Newport on the Isle of Wight.

== Conservation ==
The IUCN Red List assessment finds this species to be Endangered, citing threats to its habitat from commercial development, recreational activities, and marine pollution. For example, the site in Newport on the Isle of Wight where one specimen was collected has since been developed as a car park. This centipede is one of four myriapod species listed by the United Kingdom pursuant to the UK Biodiversity Action Plan as being of principal importance for the conservation of biodiversity in England.

== Description ==
Adult males of this species range from 7 mm to 11 mm in length, whereas adult females range from 8 mm to 13 mm in length. All specimens feature 37 pairs of legs except for one female with 39 leg pairs. The body is yellowish white, but the head and forcipules are apricot. The anterior end of the body is slender, but the rest of the body is stout.

Each antenna is long, ranging from 3.3 to 3.8 times as long as the head. The head is longer than wide, with a length/width ratio ranging from 1.1 to 1.23. The dorsal surface of the head lacks a frontal suture and features convex lateral margins and a straight posterior margin. The coxosternite of the first maxillae is undivided, and the telopodites of these maxillae feature a pair of well developed lappets. The coxosternite of the second maxillae is also undivided, and each of these maxillae features three distinct segments. The ultimate segment of these maxillae is long and cylindrical, with a small claw and long setae at the distal end.

The forcipular sternite is longer than wide and features parallel sides. The forcipule features four segments, with a prominent distal tooth on the internal margin of the first segment. Each of the next two segments feature a hump bearing a seta. The distal segment features a smooth inner margin, a prominent basal tooth, and claws that reach well beyond the front of the head.

Each walking leg ends in a well developed claw. Each leg-bearing sternite is about as long as wide, with a large setae on each corner, a few small scattered setae, and no carpophagous pit. The anterior sternites feature fields of pores, with a pore field on the posterior part of each sternite from segments 2 through 11. The sternite and the tergite of the last leg-bearing segment are shaped like trapezoids that are wider than long. The ventral surface of the basal element of each of the ultimate legs features three to five pores under the lateral margin of the adjacent sternite. Each of the ultimate legs features seven segments and a short curved claw at the distal end. These legs are somewhat swollen in the male but relatively slender in the female. The telson lacks anal pores.

This species is readily confused in the field with other soil centipedes found in the British Isles. For example, specimens thought to be N. turki at first have proven to be Schendyla nemorensis instead when examined under a microscope. The species S. nemorensis not only features a similar number of legs (37 to 43 pairs) but also shares several other traits with the species N. turki. For example, both of these species feature sternites with pore fields but without carpophaguous structures. Furthermore, the pores on the ultimate legs in each species appear only on the ventral surfaces.

The species N. turki can be distinguished from species of Schendyla, however, based on other traits. For example, the ultimate legs end in claws in Nothogeophilus but not in Schendyla. Furthermore, each of the ultimate legs features only two pores in Schendyla but three to five pores in Nothogeophilus.
