= Schendyla monodi =

Scientific classification
- Kingdom: Animalia
- Phylum: Arthropoda
- Subphylum: Myriapoda
- Class: Chilopoda
- Order: Geophilomorpha
- Family: Schendylidae
- Genus: Schendyla
- Species: S. monodi

Binomial name
- Schendyla monodi (Brölemann, 1924)

Synonyms
- Brachychendyla monodi Brölemann, 1924; Brachyschendyla viridis Verhoeff, 1951

Species of centipede

Schendyla monodi is a species of soil centipede in the family Schendylidae. This centipede can reach 23 mm in length and features 37 to 41 pairs of legs. This species is found in France, Italy, and Spain.

== Discovery and taxonomy ==
This species was first described in 1924 under the name Brachyschendyla monodi by the French myriapodologist Henry W. Brölemann. He based the original description of this species on a single female specimen found on the banks of the Penzé River in the department of Finistère in France. This species is named for the French naturalist Théodore Monod, who collected this specimen. In 1930, Brölemann introduced Astenoschendyla as a subgenus of the genus Brachyschendyla and designated B. monodi as the type species for this new subgenus.

In 1951, the German zoologist Karl W. Verhoeff described Brachyshendyla viridis as a new species. He based his description on two specimens, one of each sex, found at Monte Soratte in Italy. In 1961, however, the French myriapodologist Jean-Marie Demange deemed B. viridis to be a junior synonym of B. monodi. He based this conclusion on specimens of B. monodi found in the salt marshes of Arcachon Bay on the Atlantic coast of the department of Gironde in France. These specimens (thirty females and ten males) were the first recorded since the first specimen described in 1924 and included the first male specimens of B. monodi to be described. Finding that these French specimens exhibited the same sexual dimorphism that Verhoeff described from the Italian specimens, Demange concluded that the Italian centipedes were specimens of B. monodi rather than a new species. Authorities now regard these centipedes as the same species, but some references list both names as accepted species.

In 1995, authorities rejected Brachyschendyla as a valid genus distinct from Schendyla. Authorities now deem both Brachyschendyla and Astenoschendyla to be junior synonyms of Schendyla. Accordingly, authorities now accept Schendyla monodi as the valid name for the species described in 1924 by Brölemann.

== Distribution ==
This species is rare, with a fragmented distribution. Since the discovery of this centipede at the type locality in the French department of Finistère, at Monte Soratte in Italy, and at Arcachon in the French department of Gironde, this species has been observed at several other localities. For example, this species has been recorded at the western end of the Pyrenees in northern Spain. In the French region of Brittany, more specimens have been found not only in the department of Finistère (in the communes of Daoulas, Hanvec, Rosnoën, Argol, Riec-sur-Bélon, and Plouénan) but also in the department of Côtes-d’Armor (in the commune of Plestin-les-Grèves). In the French region of Nouvelle-Aquitaine, this centipede has been rediscovered in the department of Gironde (in the commune of Gujan-Mestras). In the French region of Pays de La Loire, this species has been discovered in salt marshes in the department of Loire-Atlantique.

== Ecology and habitats ==
In France, this species is found only in littoral habitats on the Atlantic coast, such as estuaries. This centipede favors brackish waters in areas where silt is deposited and fresh water and seawater mix. This species is found under stones on mudflats, among glassworts (Salicornia), above colonies of cordgrass (Spartina), and in rock crevices filled with silt in salt marshes, sometimes along with other centipede species, such as Schendyla peyerimhoffi and Geophilus seurati. Authorities consider this species vulnerable to threats to these coastal habitats in France. In southern Brittany, for example, isolated populations of this species are found in sensitive habitats that face increasing pressure from human activities. Humans pose threats at several sites through beach development for tourism or port infrastructure projects. Although this centipede is a halophile in France, this species has also been found inland in Spain, and in Italy, specimens were found on the northern slope of a mountain and in an olive grove.

== Description ==
Males of this species feature 37 or 39 pairs of legs, whereas females feature 39 or 41 leg pairs. Adults can range from 14 mm to 23 mm in length. The dorsal plate on the head (cephalic plate) is longer than wide, with a length/width ratio of about 1.2. The clypeus features a pair of setae behind the antennae, a small pair near the labrum, and a row of three setae in between. The labrum in French specimens features five to eight median teeth rounded like tubercles, with one or two pointed lateral teeth on each side. The Italian specimens described by Verhoeff, however, feature twelve blunt teeth in the middle of the labrum. Each of the mandibles features a pectinate lamella and a dentate lamella, which usually bears six teeth. These teeth can sometimes be divided into two or three blocks.

A pair of long and slender lappets project from the coxosternite of the first maxillae as well as from the basal articles of the telopodites of the first maxillae. The claws of the second maxillae are simple, without any spines on the concave surface, but with a few spines around the base. The first article of the forcipule lacks denticles. The claw of the forcipule features only a small nodule at the base and a smooth concave surface.

The sternites feature no fields of pores. The main sternite of the last leg-bearing segment is shaped like a trapezoid that is two-thirds as long as the anterior margin is wide, with the posterior margin barely half as wide as the anterior margin. The basal element of each of the ultimate legs (coxopleuron) features two pores. Each of the ultimate legs features a relatively basal article (prefemur) that is swollen on the inner side in the male but not swollen in the female. Each of the ultimate legs ends with a short terminal article, about one-half to two-thirds as long as the penultimate article of the same leg. The distal end of each of the ultimate legs lacks a claw but can feature spines.

This centipede exhibits many traits that characterize the genus Schendyla. For example, like others in this genus, this species features two large pores on the coxopleuron. Furthermore, like others in this genus, this species lacks pores on the sternites of the posterior trunk segments.

This species shares a more distinctive set of traits with another species in the same genus, S. peyerimhoffi, which is also found in Spain and in littoral habitats along the coast of Brittany in France. For example, both species lack denticles on the first article of the forcipule, feature lappets on the telopodites of the first maxillae, and have a terminal article on each of the ultimate legs that is shorter than the penultimate article of the same leg. Furthermore, both species feature adults of similar size (18 mm to 22 mm in length in S. peyerimhoffi), can feature similar numbers of teeth not only on the labrum but also on the dentate lamella of each mandible, and include males with 37 or 39 leg pairs and females with 41 leg pairs.

These two species can be distinguished, however, based on other traits. For example, pore fields appear on the sternites of the anterior trunk segments in S. peyerimhoffi but not in S. monodi. Furthermore, the concave surface of the forcipule is smooth in S. monodi, but this concavity is crenulated in S. peyerimhoffi. Moreover, the terminal article on each of the ultimate legs is at most about one-third as long as the penultimate article of the same leg in S. peyerimhoffi, whereas this terminal article is longer in S. monodi.

Some other species of Schendyla not only lack denticles on the first article of the forcipule but also lack pore fields on the anterior sternites. Each of these other species, however, features more legs than S. monodi does: S. aternana (with 49 leg pairs), S. capusei (with at least 47 leg pairs), S. hispanica (with 49 leg pairs), and S. varnensis (with 47 leg pairs). Furthermore, the telopodites of the first maxillae feature lappets in S. monodi but not in S. hispanica nor in S. varnensis, and the terminal article on each of the ultimate legs is shorter than the penultimate article of the same leg in S. monodi but not in S. capusei nor in S. varnensis.
