= Schendyla nemorensis =

Scientific classification
- Kingdom: Animalia
- Phylum: Arthropoda
- Subphylum: Myriapoda
- Class: Chilopoda
- Order: Geophilomorpha
- Family: Schendylidae
- Genus: Schendyla
- Species: S. nemorensis

Binomial name
- Schendyla nemorensis (C.L. Koch, 1837)

Synonyms
- Geophilus nemorensis C.L. Koch, 1837; Schendyla furcidens Kaczmarek, 1962; Geophilus gracilis Harger,1872; Brachygeophilus sinionus Manfredi,1953

Species of centipede

Schendyla nemorensis is a species of soil centipede in the family Schendylidae. This centipede is the type species for the genus Schendyla. This species can reach 30 mm in length. This centipede is found in most of the western Palearctic realm, where this species is frequently recorded in Europe.

== Distribution ==
This species is widespread in Europe, where this centipede is found, for example, in Iceland, Norway, Denmark, Sweden, Latvia, Poland, Ireland, Great Britain, France, Belgium, the Netherlands, Germany, Italy, Austria, the Czech Republic, Slovakia, Slovenia, Croatia, Bosnia and Herzegovina, and Greece. This centipede is also found in North Africa, where this species has been recorded in Morocco, Algeria, and Tunisia. This species has also been introduced by humans overseas, for example, to Tasmania and North America, including the United States.

== Discovery and taxonomy ==
This species was first described as Geophilus nemorensis in 1836 by the German entomologist Carl Ludwig Koch. The type locality is the vicinity of Regensburg in Bavaria, southern Germany. In 1866, the Danish entomologists Vilhelm Bergsøe and Frederik Vilhelm August Meinert proposed the genus Schendyla to contain this centipede as the type species S. nemorensis. Authorities have since accepted S. nemorensis as the valid name for this species.

Since the original description of this species, some centipedes described as new species have later been deemed to be specimens of S. nemorensis instead. For example, in 1872, the American zoologist Oscar Harger described Geophilus gracilis as a new species discovered in Connecticut. In 1953, however, the American myriapodologist Ralph E. Crabill, Jr. deemed G. gracilis to be a junior synonym of S. nemorensis. Similarly, a centipede described in 1953 as a new species, Brachygeophilus sinionus, discovered in Italy, was found in 2014 to be another specimen of S. nemorensis, and centipedes described in 1962 as specimens of another new species, Schendyla furcidens, discovered in Poland, were deemed in 2012 to be the same species as S. nemorensis.

Moreover, some specimens described as belonging to new subspecies of S. nemorensis have later been found not to represent such subspecies. For example, in 1937, the German zoologist Karl W. Verhoeff described S. nemorensis quarnerana as a subspecies of S. nemorensis discovered in Croatia. Similarly, in 1944, the British biologist Frank Turk described S. nemorensis fountaini as a subspecies of S. nemorensis discovered in the United Kingdom. In 2014, however, the Italian biologists Lucio Bonato and Alessandro Minelli not only deemed S. nemorensis quarnerana to be a junior synonym of another species in the same genus, S. carniolensis, but also deemed S. nemorensis fountaini to be a junior synonym of S. nemorensis rather than a valid subspecies.

== Description ==
This centipede is a pale yellow, like straw, but the head is slightly darker, with a rusty or brownish shade of yellow. In northern Europe, males usually have 37 to 41 pairs of legs, and females usually have 39 to 43 leg pairs, but Mediterranean specimens may have more. For example, on the island of Sardinia, specimens have been recorded with as many as 45 leg pairs.

Adults range from 14 mm to 30 mm in length. The dorsal plate on the head (cephalic plate) is longer than wide, with a length/width ratio of about 1.1 or 1.2. The clypeus features a pair of setae behind the antennae, a small pair in front of the labrum, and usually one row (but sometimes two rows) of four to six setae in between. The labrum features up to 12 median denticles rounded like tubercles, with one or two pointed lateral denticles on each side. Each of the mandibles features a dentate lamella with six teeth in a single block. A slender lappet projects from the basal article of each telopodite of the first maxillae. The claws of the second maxillae are simple and lack spines. The first article of the forcipule lacks denticles. The claw of the forcipule features a smooth concave surface and a denticle at the base.

The sternites usually feature fields of pores from the second leg-bearing segment to the fourteenth segment, sometimes the thirteenth or fifteenth segment. These pore fields are undivided but usually constricted in between an anterior cluster of pores and a posterior cluster. The main sternite of the last leg-bearing segment is shaped like a trapezoid with the anterior margin not only wider than the posterior margin but also nearly twice as wide as the length of the sternite. The basal element of each of the ultimate legs (coxopleuron) features two pores. The ultimate legs are swollen in both sexes and covered in dense setae. Each of the ultimate legs lacks a claw at the distal end.

This centipede exhibits many traits that characterize the genus Schendyla. For example, like others in this genus, this species features two large pores on the coxopleuron. Furthermore, like others in this genus, this species lacks pores on the sternites of the posterior trunk segments.

This species shares an especially extensive set of distinctive traits with another species in the same genus, S. peyerimhoffi, which is also found in Ireland, Great Britain, France, and Morocco. For example, both of these species lack denticles on the first article of the forcipule, feature lappets on the telopodites of the first maxillae, and feature second maxillae with simple claws that lack spines. Furthermore, like the species S. nemorensis, the species S. peyerimhoffi features undivided pore fields on the anterior sternites, includes adults ranging from 18 mm to 22 mm in length, and can feature a mandible with six teeth in a single block on the dentate lamella. Moreover, these two species can feature similar patterns of setae on the clypeus, pore fields on similar segments, and similar numbers of legs, with 37 to 45 pairs in males and 41 to 49 pairs in females in S. peyerimhoffi. These centipedes are so similar that some authorities suggest that they may be the same species.

These two similar species can be distinguished, however, based on other traits. For example, the concave surface of the forcipular claw is smooth in S. nemorensis but crenulated in S. peyerimhoffi. Furthermore, the pore field on the sternites is elongated to form a narrow longitudinal band in S. peyerimhoffi but not in S. nemorensis.

Some authorities also suggest that these two species can be distinguished based on the length of the most distal article on the ultimate legs. This article is short in S. peyerimhoffi, from one fifth to one third as long as the penultimate article on the same leg, but can be longer in S. nemorensis, from two fifths to three fifths as long as the penultimate article on the same leg. Other authorities describe the ultimate article as short in at least some specimens of S. nemorensis, however, as short as one third the length of the penultimate article on the same leg, or even shorter, casting doubt on the diagnostic value of this proffered difference between these two species.

== Ecology and habitats ==
This centipede is a solitary terrestrial predator that inhabits plant litter and soil, often found in the layer of humus, frequently hidden under rocks or dead wood, but also found in tussocks and under loose bark on trees. This species is found in diverse habitats. For example, in Great Britain, for example, this centipede is found in woodland, grassland, gardens, and churchyards, as well as on the coast. In Sardinia, where the climate is Mediterranean, this species is typically found in oak woodland, usually Quercus ilex, but also found in more open habitats, such as meadows, or among shrubs such as Pistacia lentiscus, Cistus monspeliensis, or garrigue. This centipede is also sometimes found in caves as a trogloxene. This species has been recorded at elevations ranging from sea level up to 1,800 meters.
