= Schendyla antici =

Scientific classification
- Kingdom: Animalia
- Phylum: Arthropoda
- Subphylum: Myriapoda
- Class: Chilopoda
- Order: Geophilomorpha
- Family: Schendylidae
- Genus: Schendyla
- Species: S. antici

Binomial name
- Schendyla antici Stojanović, 2024

Species of centipede

Schendyla antici is a species of soil centipede in the family Schendylidae. This species is notable as one of only six species in the order Geophilomorpha to include centipedes with only 29 pairs of legs, which is also the minimum number recorded in the genus Schendyla. No other species in this genus features so few legs. This centipede is also notable for its small size, reaching only 8 mm in length, the minimum recorded for any species of Schendyla.

== Discovery and distribution ==
This species was first described by three biologists from the University of Belgrade (Dalibor Z Stojanović, Mirko Ševićin, and Slobodan E Makarov) in 2024. They based this description on specimens found in soil samples from an old beech forest at an elevation of 830 meters on Medvednik mountain in western Serbia. These specimens include not only a male holotype collected in 2011 and fourteen paratypes (five males and nine females) collected in 2021 but also seven more specimens (two males, five females, and three juvenile females) collected in 2023. The holotype is deposited in the Institute of Zoology at the University of Belgrade. The specific name of S. antici honors the Serbian myriapodologiist Dragan Antić, who discovered the first specimen and participated in the collection of most of the others.

== Description ==
This species exhibits sexual dimorphism in leg number: All male specimens have 29 pairs of legs, and all female specimens have 31 leg pairs. This species is almost white with pale yellowish parts of the head, antennae, mouthparts, forcipular segment, and claws of the walking legs. Adult specimens range from 4.5 mm to 8.0 mm in length, and the juvenile female specimens measure about 4 mm long. Adult females (with an average length of 6.5 mm) tend to be larger than adult males (with an average length of 5.8 mm long). These centipedes are so small that the original description refers to S. antici as a "dwarf" species.

The dorsal plate on the head is usually 1.4 times longer than wide, with a length/width ratio ranging from about 1.3 to 1.5. The clypeus features eight setae, all in the smooth anterior part without reticulation: one pair just below the base of the antennae, then another pair behind the first pair, finally followed by a row of four setae. The middle piece of the labrum features ten median denticles rounded like tubercles, whereas each side piece features three longer pointed lateral denticles. Each of the mandibles features a dentate lamella with six to eight (usually eight) teeth on one block as well as a pectinate lamella with about 12 to 14 teeth that are translucent like glass.

The coxosternite of the first maxillae is undivided and lacks lappets, but a slender lappet projects from the basal article of each telopodite of the first maxillae.The claws of the second maxillae are slightly flattened at the distal end and feature no spines or filaments. The forcipular coxosternite lacks chitin-lines and is about 1.2 to 1.3 times wider than long. The first article of the forcipules features small and indistinct proximal denticles, and the claw of each forcipule features a small basal denticle, but the second and third articles lack denticles.

The sternites of the leg-bearing segments lack fields of pores. The main sternite of the ultimate legs is shaped like a trapezoid with the anterior margin nearly twice as wide as the posterior margin. The basal element of each of the ultimate legs (coxopleuron) features two large pores that open separately near the adjacent sternite. Each of the ultimate legs features six articles with a rudimentary claw at the distal end. The terminal article on each of the ultimate legs is small, about 3 to 3.5 times shorter than the penultimate article. The telson lacks anal pores.

This centipede exhibits many traits that characterize the genus Schendyla. For example, like others in this genus, this species features two large pores near the sternite on the basal element of each of the ultimate legs. Furthermore, like others in this genus, this species lacks pores on the sternites of the posterior trunk segments.

Diagnostic features of this species include not only its small size and modest number of legs but also a distinctive set of other traits. These traits include minute denticles on the first article of the forcipule, a rudimentary claw on the ultimate legs, and the absence of pore-fields on the sternites. These features distinguish S. antici from other species of the genus Schendyla.

For example, only four species in this genus approach S. antici in terms of leg number: S. verneri (with 31 pairs of legs), S. megobroba (with 31 pairs in males and 33 in females), S. walachica (with 33 or 35 pairs in each sex), and S. armata (with as few as 33 pairs). The species S. megobroba is small (8 mm to 12 mm in length) and has small denticles on the first article of the forcipule and no sternal pore-fields but lacks claws on the ultimate legs. The species S. verneri is small (9 mm to 10 mm in length) and has small denticles on the first article of the forcipule but also has some scattered pores on the anterior sternites and no claws on the ultimate legs. The species S. walachica has rudimentary claws on its ultimate legs but also features pore-fields on some sternites, has no denticles on the first article of the forcipule, and is twice as long as S. antici. Finally, S. armata is small (5 mm to 11 mm in length), lacks sternal pore-fields, and can feature rudimentary claws on its ultimate legs, but also features a denticle on the first article of the forcipule that is distinctly robust rather than small.
