= Schendyla =

Scientific classification
- Kingdom: Animalia
- Phylum: Arthropoda
- Subphylum: Myriapoda
- Class: Chilopoda
- Order: Geophilomorpha
- Family: Schendylidae
- Genus: Schendyla; Bergsøe & Meinert, 1866

Type species
- Geophilus nemorensis C.L. Koch, 1837

Synonyms
- Brachyschendyla Brölemann & Ribaut, 1911; Brachyschendyla (Astenoschendyla) Brolemann, 1930; Schendyla (Echinoschendyla) Brölemann & Ribaut, 1912; Brachyschendyla (Microschendyla) Brölemann & Ribaut, 1912; Brachyschendyla (Schizoschendyla) Brölemann & Ribaut, 1912

Ancestor of centipedes

Schendyla is a genus of soil centipedes in the family Schendylidae. These centipedes are found in the western part of the Palearctic realm. This genus includes more than 20 species.

== Taxonomy ==
This genus was described by Danish entomologists Vilhelm Bergsøe and Frederik Vilhelm August Meinert in 1866. They proposed this genus to contain the type species S. nemorensis, which was originally described in 1836 as Geophilus nemorensis. In 1911, the French zoologists Henry W. Brölemann and Henri Ribaut described Brachyschendyla as a new genus. In 1995, however, authorities rejected Brachyschendyla as a valid genus distinct from Schendyla. Authorities now deem Brachyschendyla to be a junior synonym of Schendyla.

Similarly, Brölemann and Ribaut subsequently proposed subgenera of Schendyla and Brachyschendyla that authorities now reject. In 1912, they introduced not only Echinoschendyla as a subgenus of Schendyla but also Microschendyla and Schizoschendyla as subgenera of Brachyschendyla. In 1930, Brölemann introduced Astenoschendyla as a subgenus of Brachyschendyla. In 2014, however, the Italian biologists Lucio Bonato and Alessandro Minelli deemed all four of these proposed subgenera to be a junior synonyms of Schendyla rather than valid subgenera.

== Description ==
Centipedes in this genus feature two large pores on the basal element (coxopleuron) of each of the ultimate legs. These ultimate legs either feature only rudimentary claws or lack claws altogether. The ultimate legs are also often conspicuously swollen. The claws of the second maxillae feature no more than a few spines, and the sternites lack fields of pores on the posterior segments.

These centipedes are pale and small, ranging from about 1 cm to about 4 cm in length, with 29 to 57 pairs of legs. The species Schendyla antici is notable for its small size (5 mm to 8 mm in length) and for having as few as 29 leg pairs (29 pairs in males and 31 in females), the minimum recorded in this genus. Other small species with notably few legs in this genus include S. verneri (reaching only 10 mm in length, with 31 pairs), S. megobroba (12 mm in length, with 31 pairs in males and 33 in females), S. walachica (15 mm in length, with as few as 33 pairs in each sex), S. gracillima (10 mm in length, with as few as 35 pairs). S. dalmatica (10 mm in length, with 37 pairs in males and 39 in females), S. dentata (12 mm in length, with 39 pairs in females), and S. armata (11 mm in length, with as few as 33 pairs). The species S. monoeci reaches only 22 mm in length but can have as many as 57 leg pairs, the maximum number found in this genus. Descriptions of the species S. vizzavonae report no more than 51 leg pairs, but this species reaches 45 mm in length, the maximum size recorded in this genus.

== Species ==
This genus includes the following species:

- Schendyla antici Stojanović, 2024
- Schendyla apenninorum (Brölemann & Ribaut, 1911)
- Schendyla armata Brölemann, 1901
- Schendyla aternana (Verhoeff, 1934)
- Schendyla capusei (Dărăbanţu & Matic, 1969)
- Schendyla carniolensis Verhoeff, 1902
- Schendyla dalmatica Attems, 1904
- Schendyla delicatula Kaczmarek, 1969
- Schendyla dentata (Brölemann & Ribaut, 1911)
- Schendyla gracillima Verhoeff, 1934
- Schendyla hispanica (Attems, 1952)
- Schendyla mediterranea Silvestri, 1898
- Schendyla megobroba Kiria & Stojanović, 2026
- Schendyla monodi (Brölemann, 1924)
- Schendyla monoeci Brölemann, 1904
- Schendyla negreai (Dărăbanţu & Matic, 1969)
- Schendyla nemorensis (C.L.Koch, 1837)
- Schendyla peyerimhoffi Brölemann & Ribaut, 1911
- Schendyla tyrolensis (Meinert, 1870)
- Schendyla varnensis (Kaczmarek, 1969)
- Schendyla verneri (Folkmanová & Dobroruka, 1960)
- Schendyla vizzavonae Léger & Duboscq, 1903
- Schendyla walachica Verhoeff, 1900
