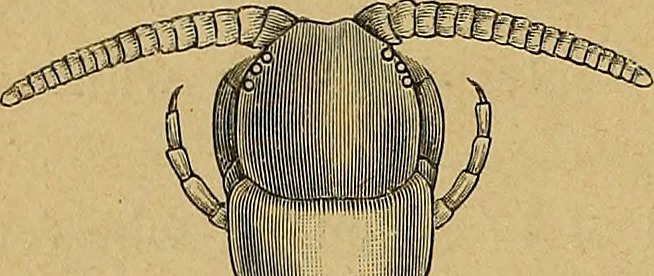

Scientific classification
- Kingdom: Animalia
- Phylum: Arthropoda
- Subphylum: Myriapoda
- Class: Chilopoda
- Order: Scolopendromorpha
- Family: Scolopendridae
- Tribe: Asanadini
- Genus: Asanada; Meinert, 1886

= Asanada =

Centipede genus

Asanada is a genus of centipedes in the subfamily Scolopendrinae. It has thirteen known species, which usually grow between 25–35 mm (0.98–1.38 in) in length. It can be distinguished from the genus Cormocephalus (= Cupipes) by having smooth (as opposed to punctured) anal pleurae, but is otherwise quite similar in appearance. The type species of the genus is A. brevicornis (by monotypy), the type specimen of which was collected in Kulu, India.

== Species ==
- Asanada agharkari (Gravely, 1912)
- Asanada akashii (Takakuwa, 1938)
- Asanada brevicornis (Meinert, 1886)
- Asanada indica (Jangi & Dass, 1984)
- Asanada lindbergi (Loksa 1971)
- Asanada maligii (Jangi & Dass, 1984)
- Asanada philippina (Chamberlin, 1921)
- Asanada sinaitica (Chamberlin, 1921)
- Asanada sokotrana (Pocock, 1899)
- Asanada sukhensis (Jangi & Dass, 1984)
- Asanada sutteri (Würmli, 1972)
- Asanada tchadensis (Dobroruka, 1968)
- Asanada walkeri (Pocock, 1891)
