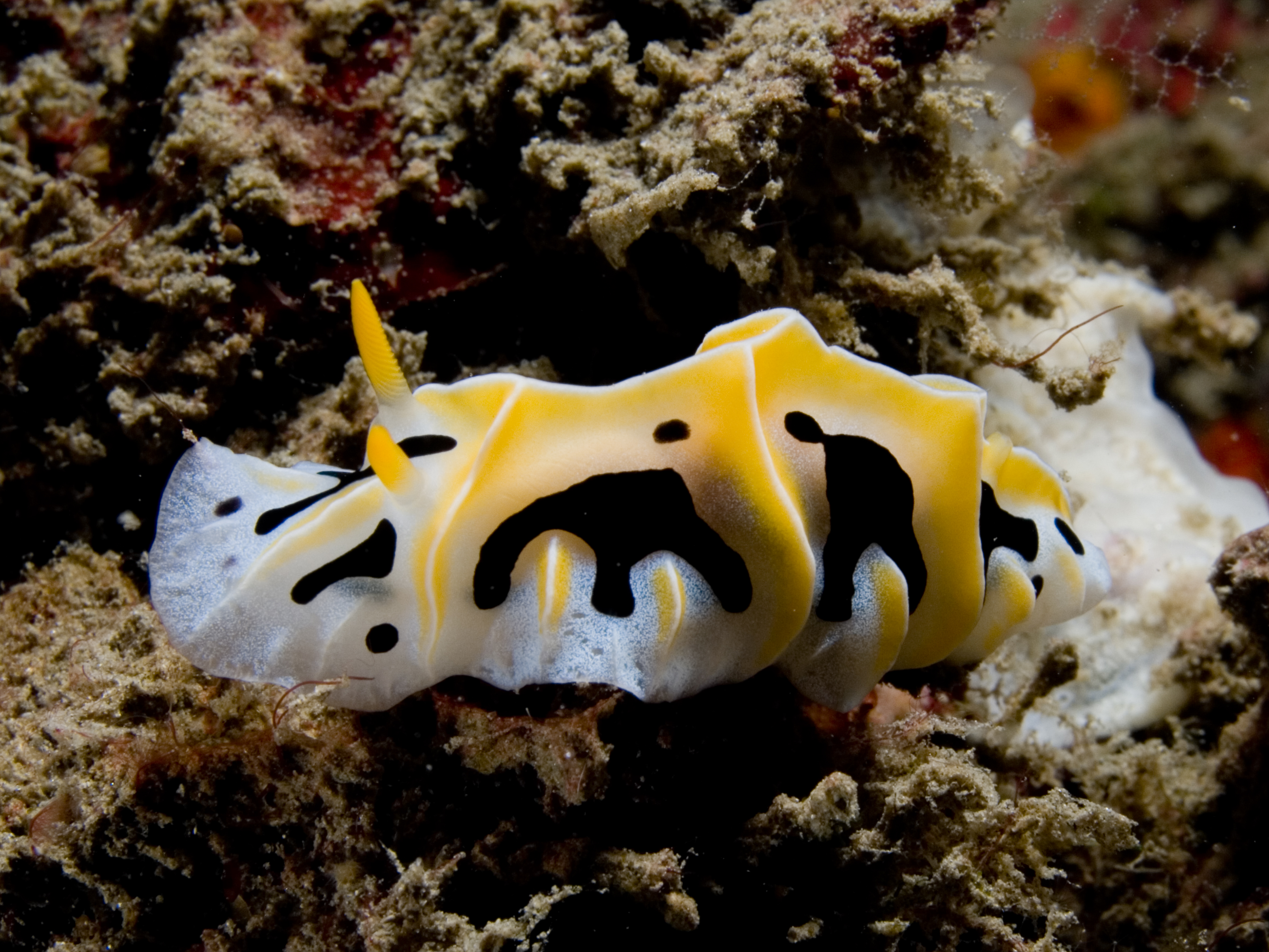
- Reticulidia fungia, head facing left

Scientific classification
- Kingdom: Animalia
- Phylum: Mollusca
- Class: Gastropoda
- Order: Nudibranchia
- Family: Phyllidiidae
- Genus: Reticulidia
- Species: R. fungia

Binomial name
- Reticulidia fungia Brunckhorst & Gosliner in Brunckhorst, 1993

= Reticulidia fungia =

Species of gastropod

The Mushroom coral reticulidia (Reticulidia fungia) is a species of sea slug, a dorid nudibranch, a shell-less marine gastropod mollusk in the family Phyllidiidae.

== Description ==
Reticulidia fungia grows to a maximum length of 40 mm. It does not grow as large as Reticulidia halgerda. Reticulidia fungia has broad-based ridges, those being fewer in number than those of Reticulidia halgerda. The base of these ridges have a fine, white border. The mantle margin is broad and blue-grey in colour. It has a single, black line around the side of its foot occurring slightly above its gills.

== Distribution ==
Reticulidia fungia occurs in areas such as:

- Fiji
- Micronesia
- Eastern Australia
- Taiwan
- Christmas Island
- Bali
- Ningaloo Reef, Western Australia

== Gallery ==
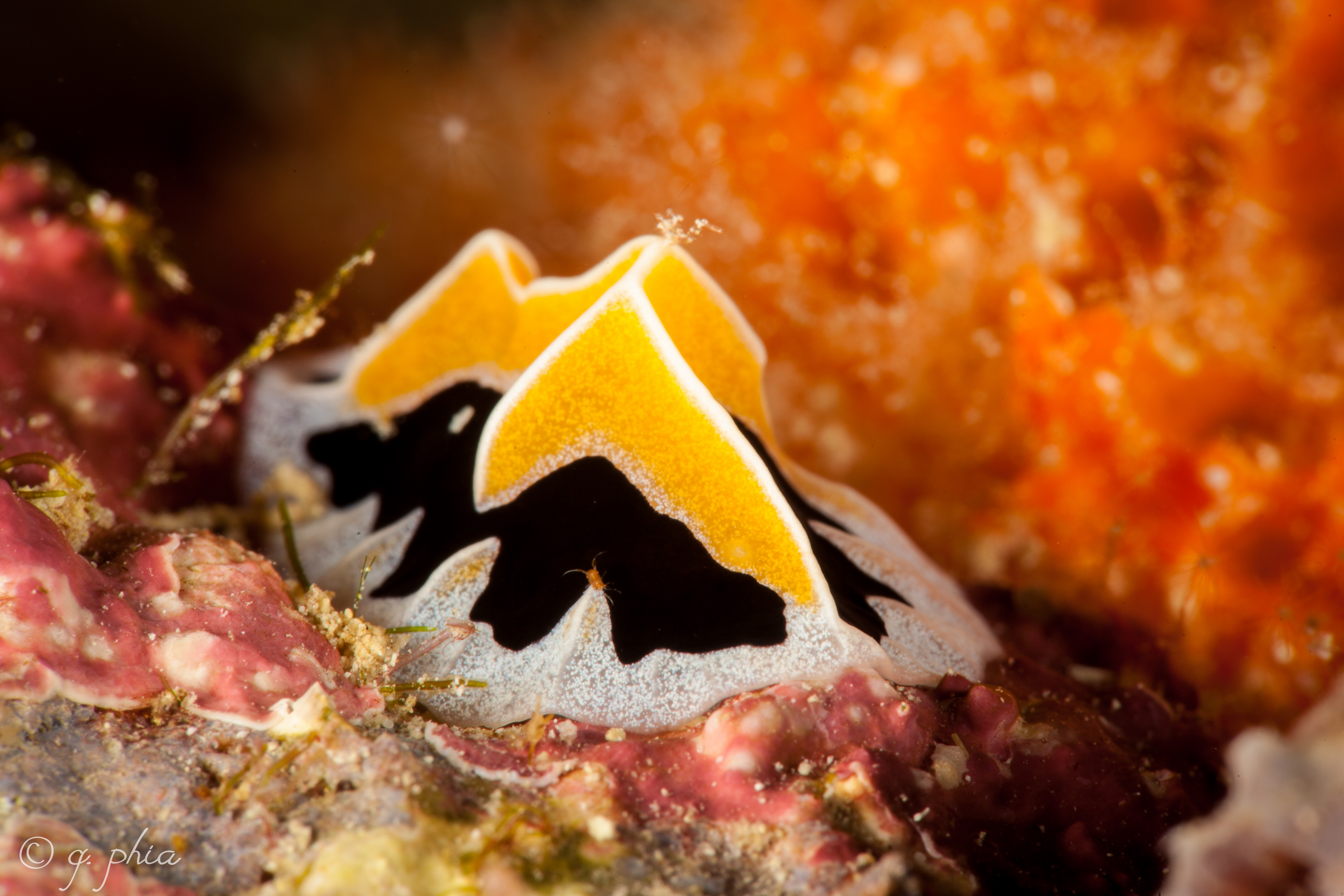
Mushroom coral reticulidia (Reticulidia fungia) at Wakatobi National Park Indonesia, 2018

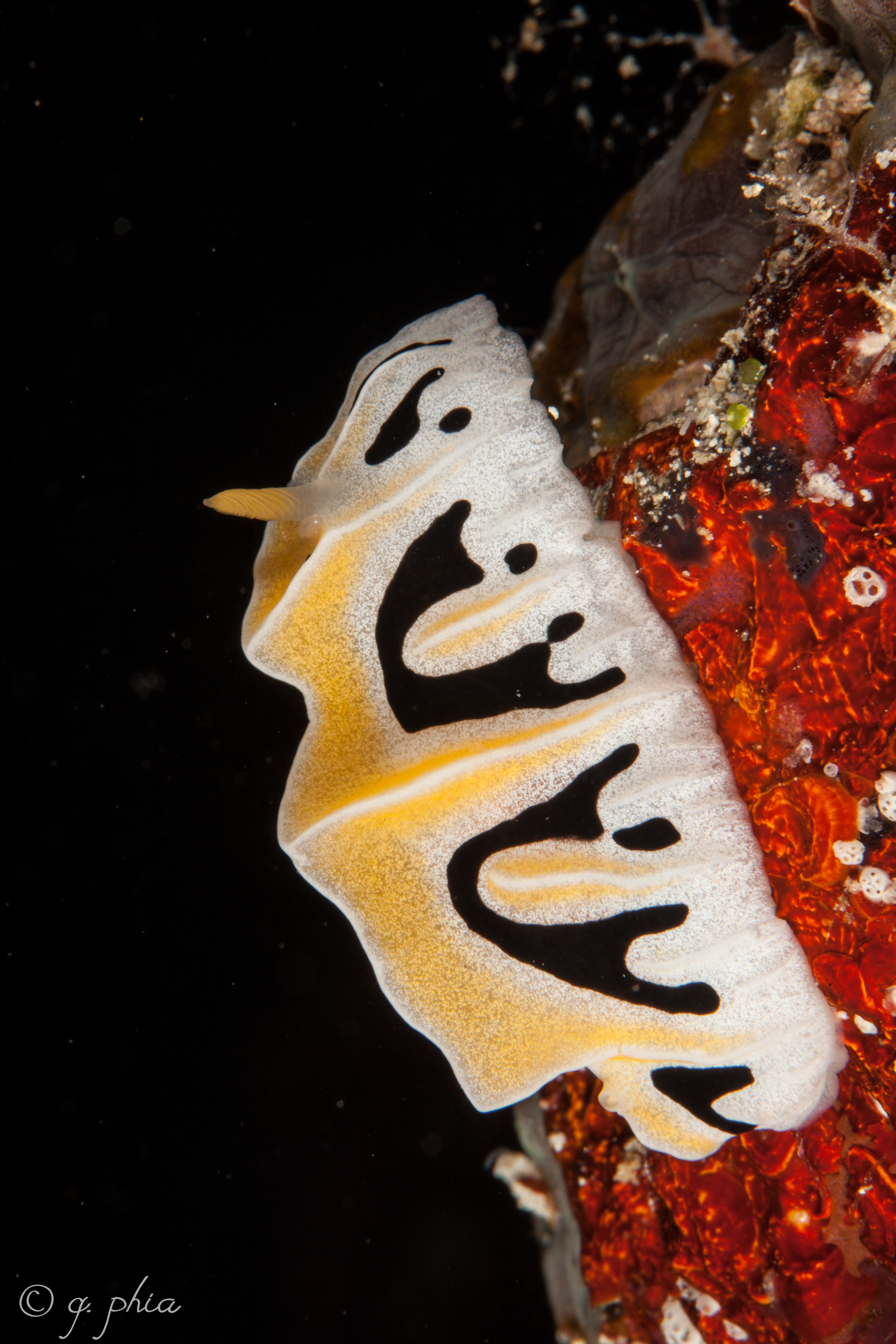
Reticulidia fungia at Wakatobi National Park Indonesia, 2018

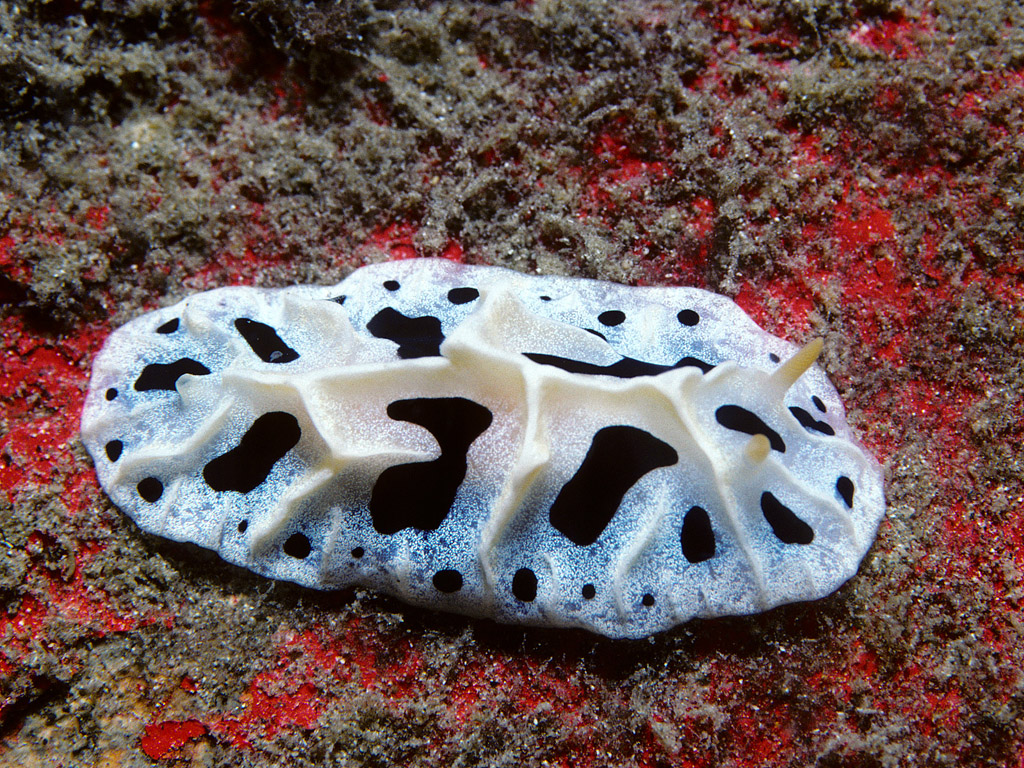
Reticulidia fungia at Bali, 1996
