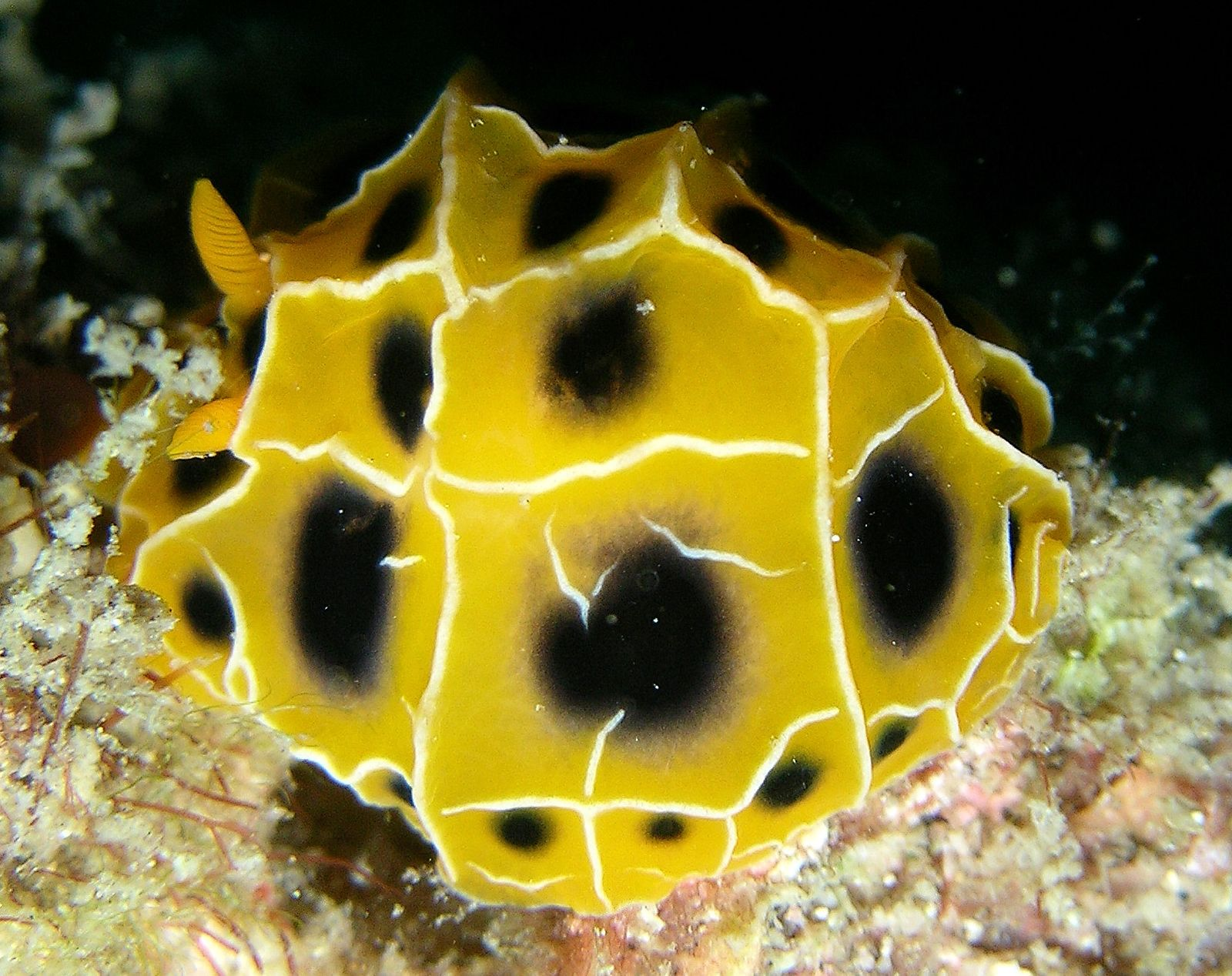
- A live individual of Reticulidia suzanneae in situ 2007, in the Anadaman Islands, head end towards the upper left

Scientific classification
- Kingdom: Animalia
- Phylum: Mollusca
- Class: Gastropoda
- Order: Nudibranchia
- Family: Phyllidiidae
- Genus: Reticulidia
- Species: R. suzanneae

Binomial name
- Reticulidia suzanneae (Valdés & Behrens, 2002)

= Reticulidia suzanneae =

Species of gastropod

Reticulidia suzanneae is a species of sea slug, a dorid nudibranch, a shell-less marine gastropod mollusk in the family Phyllidiidae.

== Distribution ==
This species has been found in the eastern Indian Ocean in East Africa and Thailand, as well as Kenya, India and Malaysia.

== Description ==
Reticulidia suzanneae is easily distinguishable from other species of Phyllidiidae. This species has a high, oval, bright yellow body with a notal surface covered in ridges. It has at least one large black spot. The ridges on the body are crested with white. R. suzanneae has orange rhinophores with 18 lamellae.
