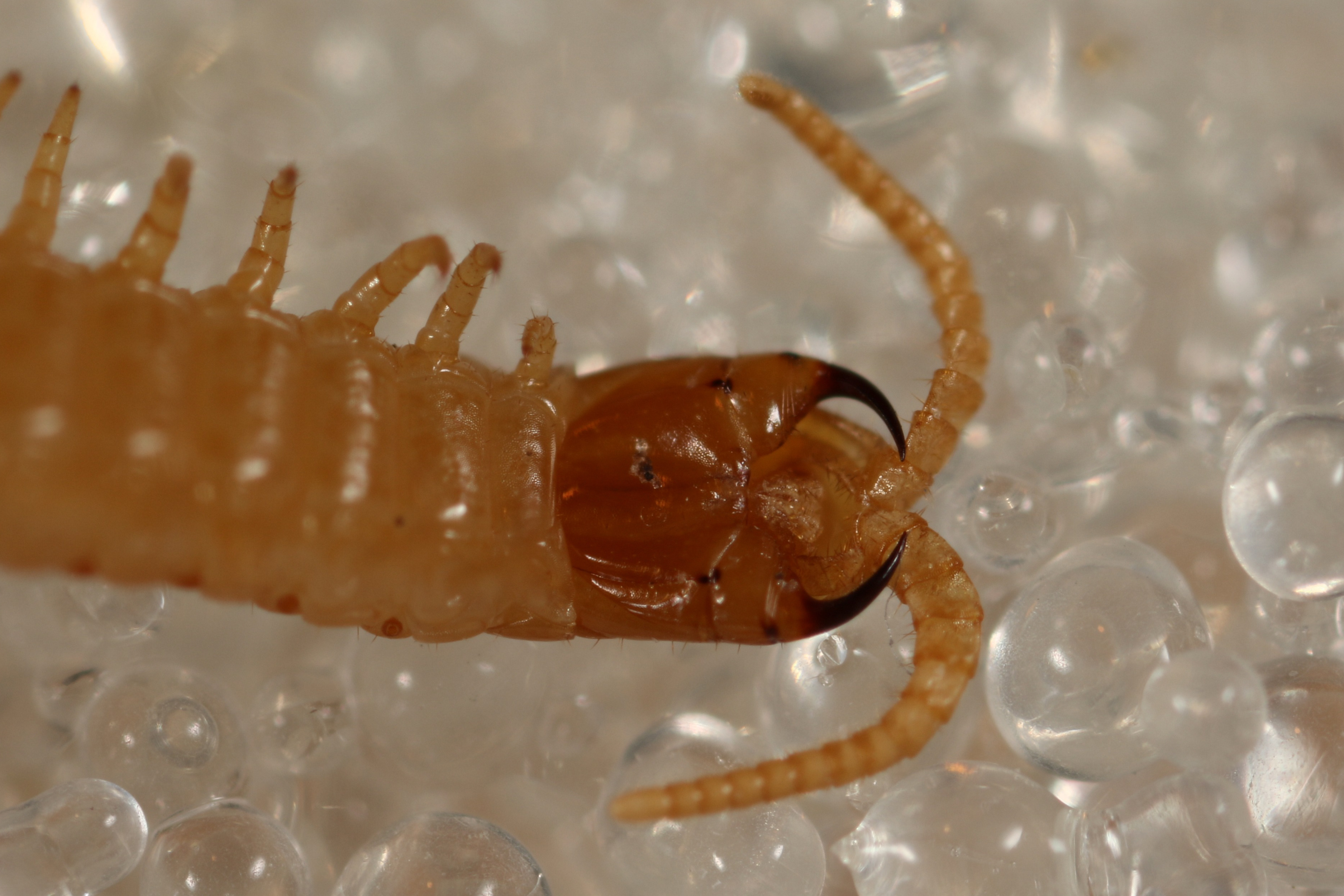
- Stenotaenia linearis

Scientific classification
- Kingdom: Animalia
- Phylum: Arthropoda
- Subphylum: Myriapoda
- Class: Chilopoda
- Order: Geophilomorpha
- Family: Geophilidae
- Genus: Stenotaenia; C.L. Koch, 1847

Type species
- Geophilus linearis C.L. Koch, 1835

Synonyms
- Insigniporus Attems, 1903; Onychopodogaster Verhoeff, 1902; Scnipaeus Bergsøe & Meinert, 1866; Simophilus Silvestri, 1896; Nesogeophilus (Euronesogeophilus) Matic, 1972; Geophilus (Notadenophilus) Verhoeff, 1928

= Stenotaenia (centipede) =

Genus of centipedes

Stenotaenia is a genus of soil centipedes in the family Geophildae. This genus has a western Palearctic distribution. The centipedes in this genus are notable for exhibiting exceptional diversity in not only segment number, ranging from 43 to 115 leg-bearing segments, but also body size, ranging between 1 cm and 8 cm in length.

== Taxonomy ==
This genus was first proposed in 1847 by the German zoologist Carl L. Koch. Although the British zoologist Reginald I. Pocock recognized Geophilus linearis as the type species of this proposed genus in 1890, he also placed this species in the genus Geophilus and deemed Stenotaenia to be a junior synonym of Geophilus. Authorities did not consider Stenotaenia to be a valid genus until 2008, when the Italian biologists Lucio Bonato and Alessandro Minelli revised the definition of this genus to include species previously assigned to other genera. Authorities now recognize Stenotaenia as a valid genus containing eleven species.

== Distribution ==
Species in this genus are well documented in the central and eastern parts of the Mediterranean region. These centipedes are found not only in the Mediterranean parts of mainland France, Corsica, Sardinia, the Italian Peninsula, Sicily, the Balkan Peninsula, the Aegean Islands, Anatolia, and the coastal region of the eastern Mediterranean Sea but also in the Atlas Mountains of North Africa, central Europe, and the Carpathian Mountains, as well as around the Black Sea and in the western Caucasus. Scattered records from the Baltic region and the central and southern parts of Great Britain are mostly from synanthropic sites and may reflect introduction by humans.

== Description ==
The genus features a head that is slightly longer than wide, without a frontal line evident on the dorsal plate. The antennae are two to three times as long as the head. The clypeus is uniformly areolate, without any clypeal areas divided into finer blocks. The margin of the labrum features slender filaments. The first maxillae feature lappets projecting from the lateral margins. Each of the second maxillae ends in a slender pointed claw. The sternum of the forcipular segment feature chitin-lines but lack evident teeth on the anterior margin. The forcipules are very short, shorter than the maximum width of the adjacent sternum. The basal article of the forcipule is wider than long, and the intermediate articles are extremely short. The inner surface of each forcipule lacks tubercles.

The ventral surface of the anterior leg-bearing segments feature pores that are grouped into a single field on each segment, but these sternal pores are divided into two paired fields on the middle segments. The anterior margin of each sternum lacks a socket in the middle (carpophagus pit). The tergum of the last leg-bearing segment is shaped like a trapezoid that is wider than long. The sternum of this segment is also wider than long, shaped like a rectangle or a trapezoid that is only slightly narrower at the rear end. The coxal glands on the ultimate legs open on the ventral surface at the internal margin at the base of each leg, usually into two pouches with one pit opening at the middle of this margin and the other opening at the anterior end of this margin. The ultimate legs are only slightly longer than the penultimate legs, and each of the ultimate legs ends in a well developed claw.

Fully grown adults in this genus range in size from only 17 mm in length, in the species S. romana and S. palpiger, to 77 mm in length, in the species S. sturanyi. Males of the species S. romana can have as few as 43 pairs of legs, the minimum number recorded in this genus. Females of the species S. sturanyi can have as many as 115 leg pairs, the maximum number recorded in this genus.

== Phylogeny ==
A phylogenetic analysis using molecular data as well as morphology suggests that the genus Stenotaenia is most closely related to the genus Diphyonyx, with the genus Tuoba as the next closest relative for these two genera. This analysis places representatives of the genera Stenotaenia and Diphyonyx together in a clade in a phylogenetic tree of the order Geophilomorpha. These two genera form a sister group for the representatives of the genus Tuoba in this analysis.

As close relatives in the family Geophilidae, the genera Stenotaenia, Diphyonyx, and Tuoba share many distinctive traits. For example, all three genera feature heads that are only slightly elongated, coxal glands opening into pouches, and ultimate legs with claws. Furthermore, all three genera lack finely areolate clypeal areas.

The species in the genus Stenotaenia share other distinctive traits with their relatives in the genus Diphyonyx. For example, both of these genera feature first maxillae with lappets, second maxillae with pointed claws, and sterna without carpophagus sockets. Furthermore, in both of these genera, the sternum of the ultimate leg-bearing segment is wider than long.

Species in the genus Stenotaenia can be distinguished from their relatives in the genus Diphyonyx, however, based on other traits. For example, on anterior trunk segments in the genus Diphyonyx, each leg ends in a claw with an anterior spur enlarged into an elongate projection. In Stenotaenia, however, this anterior spur remains small. Furthermore, the forcipular sternum features anterior tubercles in Diphyonyx but not in Stenotaenia, and the ultimate article of the forcipules is crenulated and features a basal tubercle in Diphyonyx but is smooth with no tubercles in Stenotaenia. Moreover, the leg-bearing segments feature sternal pores in Stenotaenia but not in Diphyonyx, and the coxal glands on each of the ultimate legs usually open into two pouches in Stenotaenia but only one pouch in Diphyonyx.

The species in the genus Stenotaenia share another set of traits with their relatives in the genus Tuoba. For example, both of these genera feature forcipular sterna without anterior tubercles and forcipules with a smooth internal margin on each ultimate article. Furthermore, both genera feature sternal pores on leg-bearing segments.

Species in the genus Stenotaenia can be distinguished from their relatives in the genus Tuoba, however, based on other traits. For example, the basal article of the forcipule is wider than long in Stenotaenia but about as wide as long in Tuoba, and the ultimate article of the forcipule features a basal tubercle in Tuoba but not in Stenotaenia. Furthermore, the sterna in the anterior trunk segments feature carpophagus sockets in Tuoba but not in Stenotaenia. Moreover, the anterior margin of the ultimate leg-bearing segment is much wider than the posterior margin in Tuoba but not in Stenotaenia, and the coxal glands on each of the ultimate legs usually open into two pouches in Stenotaenia but only one pouch in Tuoba.

== Species ==
This genus includes the following species:

- Stenotaenia antecribellata (Verhoeff, 1898)
- Stenotaenia asiaeminoris (Verhoeff, 1898)
- Stenotaenia cribelliger (Verhoeff, 1898)
- Stenotaenia fimbriata (Verhoeff, 1934)
- Stenotaenia linearis (C.L. Koch, 1835)
- Stenotaenia naxia (Verhoeff, 1901)
- Stenotaenia palpiger (Attems, 1903)
- Stenotaenia rhodopensis (Kaczmarek, 1970)
- Stenotaenia romana (Silvestri, 1895)
- Stenotaenia sorrentina (Attems, 1903)
- Stenotaenia sturanyi (Attems, 1903)
