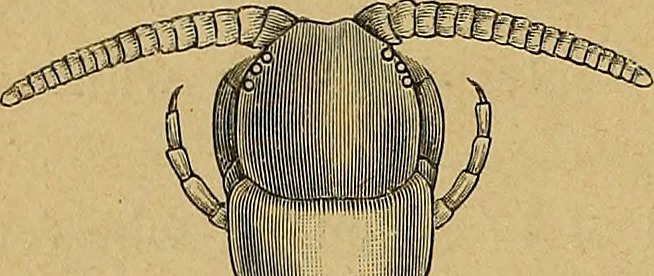

Scientific classification
- Kingdom: Animalia
- Phylum: Arthropoda
- Subphylum: Myriapoda
- Class: Chilopoda
- Order: Scolopendromorpha
- Family: Scolopendridae
- Genus: Asanada
- Species: A. brevicornis

Binomial name
- Asanada brevicornis Meinert, 1885

= Asanada brevicornis =

Species of centipede

Asanada brevicornis is a species of centipede in the Scolopendridae family. It was first described in 1885 by Danish entomologist Frederik Vilhelm August Meinert.

== Distribution ==
The species’ distribution ranges from India, Burma and the Andaman Islands to the Philippines, Sumba, New Guinea and north-eastern Australia.

== Behaviour ==
The centipedes are solitary terrestrial predators that inhabit plant litter, soil and rotting wood.
