= Schendyla dentata =

Scientific classification
- Kingdom: Animalia
- Phylum: Arthropoda
- Subphylum: Myriapoda
- Class: Chilopoda
- Order: Geophilomorpha
- Family: Schendylidae
- Genus: Schendyla
- Species: S. dentata

Binomial name
- Schendyla dentata (Brölemann & Ribaut, 1911)

Synonyms
- Brachychendyla dentata Brölemann & Ribaut, 1911; Brachyschendyla (Microschendyla) dentata Brölemann & Ribaut, 1912

Species of centipede

Schendyla dentata is a species of soil centipede in the family Schendylidae. This centipede is widespread in western Europe. This species is notable not only for its small size, reaching only 12 mm in length, but also for the absence of males in all samples collected. This absence of males suggests that this species reproduces through parthenogenesis.

== Discovery and distribution ==
This species was first described in 1911 by the French zoologists Henry W. Brölemann and Henri Ribaut. They based the original description of this species on a single female specimen found in the central Pyrenees, in Saint-Béat in the department of Haute-Garonne in France. In 1930, Brölemann recorded this species 150 km further north, in the Montague Noire mountain range, in the department of Tarn in France. No more finds were recorded until the 1970 report of the collection of six females and three juveniles in 1968 from two urban sites in the county of Surrey in England. Since then, this species has been recorded in numerous other locations, including sites in southern England, Scotland, Wales, and Ireland, as well as Austria, the Netherlands, and Denmark.

== Taxonomy ==
Brölemann and Ribaut originally described this centipede in 1911 under the name Brachyschendyla dentata. In 1912, Brölemann and Ribaut introduced Microschendyla as a subgenus in the genus Brachyschendyla and included Brachyschendyla dentata in their proposed subgenus. Authorities have since deemed both Brachyschendyla and Brachyschendyla (Microschendyla) to be junior synonyms of Schendyla. Authorities now accept S. dentata as the valid name for this species.

== Ecology ==
This species has often been found near buildings in urban environments or at other sites influenced by humans. These locations include churchyards, gardens, or abandoned sites in Surrey, Norfolk, Plymouth, Oxfordshire, West Cornwall, and London in England, as well as a garden in Copenhagen in Denmark and a park in Amsterdam in the Netherlands. Authorities assume that S. dentata is native in its range from France to Austria, where this species was found in a forest southwest of the summit of Leopoldsberg near Vienna, but this species was probably introduced by humans to England, where specimens have been observed only in urban habitats or otherwise synanthropic sites. The small size of this species makes this centipede likely to be transported with plants and soil undetected and spread inadvertently by humans. Authorities also suspect that parthenogenetic reproduction has facilitated the establishment of this species in urban and suburban environments.

== Description ==
This species is small, with adults ranging from 9 mm to 12 mm in length and juveniles ranging from 5 mm to 6.5 mm in length. This centipede is pale and somewhat translucent and features 39 pairs of legs. The head is slightly longer than wide, with a length/width ratio ranging from 1.1 to 1.2. The labrum features 13 to 15 teeth, with the middle five to seven teeth pigmented and rounded like tubercles and the lateral teeth pale and sharper but also more obtuse. The clypeus typically features two setae behind the antennae, two tiny setae in front of the labrum, and six intermediate setae in between, but specimens often deviate from this common pattern. Each of the mandibles features not only a pectinate lamella but also a dentate lamella with four to seven teeth arranged in one or two blocks.

The first maxillae feature two pairs of lappets, a well developed pair on the telopodites and a small pair on the coxosternite at the base of these maxillae. The smaller pair of lappets are obscure, however, and are often described as absent. Each of the second maxillae ends in a simple claw without spines. The inner surface of each forcipule features two teeth: a well developed tooth on the first article and a prominent tooth at the base of the claw. This claw also has a smooth concave surface.

The sternites feature no fields of pores. The basal element of each of the ultimate legs (coxopleuron) features two pores in adults but only one pore in juveniles. Each of the ultimate legs ends with a rudimentary truncated terminal article, only one-seventh the length of the penultimate article of the same leg in adults, and only one-third the length of the penultimate article of the same leg in juveniles. The claw at the end of each of the ultimate legs is either rudimentary, reduced to a flattened tubercle armed with a spine, or entirely absent.

This centipede shares many traits with other species in the genus Schendyla. For example, like others in this genus, this species features two pores on each coxopleuron. Furthermore, like others in this genus, this species lacks pores on the sternites of the posterior trunk segments.

This species shares an especially distinctive set of traits with another species in the same genus, S. armata, found in France, Monaco, and Italy. For example, both of these species not only feature a robust denticle on the first article of the forcipule but also lack pore fields on all sternites. Furthermore, the species S. armata is also small, with adults ranging from 5 mm to 11 mm in length, and like the species S. dentata, includes females with 39 leg pairs.

These two similar species can be distinguished, however, based on other traits. For example, the terminal article of the ultimate legs is short in S. dentata, only one-seventh as long as the penultimate article of the same leg, but longer in S. armata, at least as long as the penultimate article of the same leg. Furthermore, the claw on the forcipule features a long sharp denticle in S. dentata but not in S. armata.
