= Schendyla megobroba =

Scientific classification
- Kingdom: Animalia
- Phylum: Arthropoda
- Subphylum: Myriapoda
- Class: Chilopoda
- Order: Geophilomorpha
- Family: Schendylidae
- Genus: Schendyla
- Species: S. megobroba

Binomial name
- Schendyla megobroba Kiria & Stojanović, 2026

Species of centipede

Schendyla megobroba is a species of soil centipede in the family Schendylidae. This centipede is the first in this family recorded in the country of Georgia and is notable for its modest number of legs, with only 31 pairs in males and 33 pairs in females. Only one species in the genus Schendyla has been recorded with fewer than 31 leg pairs.

== Discovery and distribution ==
This species was first described in 2026 by the zoologists Eleonora Kiria, Shalva Barjadze, and Dalibor Z Stojanović. They based this description on a male holotype collected in 2024 and 28 paratypes (14 females and 14 males) collected in 2023. A team of collectors found these specimens in the municipality of Mtkheta in Tbilisi National Park, on the southern slope of the Greater Caucasus mountain range in Georgia. This centipede is known only from this type locality. The species name means "friendship" in Georgian and alludes to the team that collected the type specimens. All specimens were found in leaf litter and topsoil sampled from an oriental beech (Fagus orientalis) forest at an elevation of about 875 meters. The holotype and 23 paratypes are deposited at Ilia State University in Tbilisi, Georgia, and five paratypes are deposited at the University of Belgrade in Belgrade, Serbia.

== Description ==
This species exhibits sexual dimorphism in leg number: All male specimens have 31 pairs of legs, and all female specimens have 33 leg pairs. This centipede is nearly white with pale yellow parts of the head, antennae, and forcipular segment. Specimens range from 8.0 mm to 11.9 mm in length, with the average length of the females (9.6 mm) greater than the average length of the males (9.0 mm).

The dorsal plate on the head is usually 1.3 times longer than wide, with a length/width ratio ranging from 1.2 to 1.4. The anterior part of the clypeus features two pairs of setae. The middle piece of the labrum features eight to ten median denticles rounded like tubercles, whereas each side piece features three longer pointed lateral denticles. Each of the mandibles features a dentate lamella with five teeth on one block as well as a pectinate lamella with about 13 teeth that are translucent like glass.

The coxosternite of the first maxillae is undivided and lacks lappets, but a small rounded lappet projects from the basal article of each telopodite of the first maxillae. The coxosternite of the second maxillae is also undivided. The distal end of each telopodite of the second maxillae is flattened like a spatula, without spines or filaments. The forcipular coxosternite lacks chitin-lines and is about 1.3 times wider than long. The first article of each forcipule features small proximal denticles, but the second and third articles lack denticles.

The sternites of the leg-bearing segments lack fields of pores. The main sternite of the ultimate legs is shaped like a trapezoid with the anterior margin almost 2.5 times wider than the posterior margin. The basal element of each of the ultimate legs (coxopleuron) features two large pores that open separately near the adjacent sternite. Each of the ultimate legs features six articles with no claw at the tip. The terminal article on each of the ultimate legs is small, about 5.5 times shorter than the penultimate article. The telson lacks anal pores.

This centipede exhibits many traits that characterize the genus Schendyla. For example, like others in this genus, this species features two large pores on the coxopleuron near the sternite of the last leg-bearing segment. Furthermore, like others in this genus, this species lacks pores on the sternites of the posterior trunk segments.

This species shares an especially distinctive set of traits with another small species of Schendyla with a similar number of legs, S. antici, a centipede found in Serbia. For example, both of these species lack pore fields on all sternites, and both species feature small proximal denticles on the first article of the forcipules. Furthermore, the species S. antici features denticles on the labrum (ten median denticles rounded like tubercles, with three longer pointed lateral denticles on each side) that are similar to the set observed in S. megobroba.

These two similar species can be distinguished, however, based on other traits. For example, the ultimate legs lack claws in S. megobroba but feature rudimentary claws in S. antici, the dentate lamella on the mandible features five teeth in S. megobroba but six to eight (usually eight) teeth in S. antici, and the lappets on the basal article of the first maxillae are small in S. megobroba but relatively long and thin in S. antici. Furthermore, the species S. antici features even fewer legs, only 29 pairs in males and 31 pairs in females, and is smaller, with adults ranging from 4.5 mm to 8.0 mm in length, than S. megobroba.

The only species of Schendyla other than S. megobroba with a similar number of legs without any claws on the ultimate legs is S. verneri, with 31 leg pairs, found in Russia and Ukraine. Like the species S. megobroba, the species S. verneri features small denticles on the first article of the forcipules. Furthermore, the species S. verneri is also similar in size, ranging from 9 mm to 10 mm in length.

The species S. megobroba and S. verneri can be distinguished, however, based on other traits. For example, the anterior sternites feature a few scattered pores in S. verneri but not in S. megobroba. Furthermore, the dentate lamella on the mandible features five teeth in S. megobroba but only three teeth in S. verneri.
