= Stenotaenia asiaeminoris =

Scientific classification
- Kingdom: Animalia
- Phylum: Arthropoda
- Subphylum: Myriapoda
- Class: Chilopoda
- Order: Geophilomorpha
- Family: Geophilidae
- Genus: Stenotaenia
- Species: S. asiaeminoris

Binomial name
- Stenotaenia asiaeminoris (Verhoeff, 1898)

Species of centipede

Stenotaenia asiaeminoris is a species of soil centipede in the family Geophildae. This centipede is found in Turkey. This species is large, reaching 47 mm in length, and can have 75, 77, or 79 pairs of legs. This species is notable for featuring only one article between the basal and ultimate articles on each forcipule, rather than the two intermediate articles usually found in geophilid centipedes.

== Discovery ==
This centipede was first described in 1898 by the German zoologist Karl W. Verhoeff. He based the original description of this centipede based on seven syntypes (five females and two males). These specimens were found in the Cilicia region of southern Anatolia in Turkey. One syntype is deposited in the Museum für Naturkunde in Berlin.

== Taxonomy ==
Verhoeff originally described this centipede under the name Geophilus linearis asiae-minoris as a subspecies of the species Geophilus linearis, but in 1925, he listed this centipede in an identification key as a separate species under the name Geophilus asiaeminoris. In 1929, the Austrian myriapodologist Carl Attems treated this centipede as a separate species under the name Clinopodes asiae minoris, but in 1947, he listed this centipede in an identification key as a subspecies under the name Clinopodes linearis asiae minoris. In 2008, the Italian biologists Lucio Bonato and Alessandro Minelli recognized this centipede as a distinct species and assigned this species to the genus Stenotaenia, which they revised to include Geophilus linearis as the type species. Authorities now regard both Stenotaenia asiaeminoris and Stenotaenia linearis as valid species in this genus.

== Distribution ==
Since the description of the first specimens of this centipede found in the Cilicia region of southern Anatolia, this species was also recorded from Pamukkale, a natural site in Denizli Province in western Anatolia. Records of S. linearis elsewhere in Turkey could also represent specimens of S. asiaeminoris, as most authors conducting surveys of fauna ignored S. asiaeminoris. These authors have often misidentified specimens of other Stenotaenia species, mistakenly referring these specimens to S. linearis, which is found mainly in central Europe.

== Description ==
The female specimens of S. asiaeminoris range from 43 mm to 47 mm in length, whereas the males are smaller, measuring only 38 mm in length. The males have 75 pairs of legs, whereas the females have 77 or 79 leg pairs. A pair of small lappets project from the lateral margins of the telopodites of the first maxillae, but no lappets project from the corresponding coxosternite. Each of the second maxillae ends in a pointed claw. The forcipular coxosternite features a pair of chitin lines that reach the condyles at the anterior margin at the base of the forcipules. This anterior margin is angulated rather than nearly straight. The forcipules and the corresponding sternum each lack teeth. Each forcipule features only one recognizable article between the basal and ultimate articles rather than two distinct intermediate articles.

The ventral surface of the leg-bearing segments feature sternal fields of pores. On anterior segments, the pore fields appear in the middle of each sternum and are shaped like trapezoids that are wider than long and rounded at the front. The front of this trapezoid becomes indented at the 15th or 16th sternite, and the pore field divides into two clusters at the 34th sternite.

The base of each of the ultimate legs features glands that open into two pouches with pores, a larger anterior pouch and a smaller posterior pouch. The ultimate legs end in claws. These legs are slender in the female but thicker in the male. The ventral surface of these legs feature short bristles that are dense in the male but sparse in the female. The telson features anal pores.

This species shares many traits with other species in the genus Stenotaenia. For example, like others in this genus, this species features lappets on the first maxillae, claws on the second maxillae, a forcipular sternum with chitin lines but without teeth, forcipules without teeth on the inner surface, and well developed claws on the ultimate legs. Furthermore, like others in the same genus, this species features sternal pore fields that are undivided on anterior segments but divided into two clusters on the middle segments.

Originally described as a subspecies of S. linearis, the species S. asiaeminoris shares a more extensive set of traits with this related species. The species S. asiaeminoris also shares more distinctive traits with S. bosporana, another species in the same genus that is also found in Anatolia. For example, all three of these species features chitin lines that reach the condyles at the anterior margin of the forcipular sternum, and in all three species, this anterior margin is angulated rather than nearly straight. Furthermore, all three species feature glands that open into two distinct pouches with pores at the base of each of the ultimate legs, with one pouch in front of the other.

The species S. asiaeminoris can be distinguished from S. linearis, however, based on the number of intermediate articles on the forcipules. Whereas S. linearis features two distinct intermediate articles on each forcipule, S. asiaeminoris features only one distinct article between the basal and ultimate articles. The species S. asiaeminoris and S. bosporana are two of only four species in the genus Stenotaenia that lack two distinct intermediate articles on each forcipule.

The species S. asiaeminoris can be distinguished from S. bosporana as well as S. linearis, however, based on other traits. For example, in S. asiaeminoris, the pore fields on the anterior part of the trunk are in the middle of each sternum and shaped like trapezoids that are wider than long. In the other two species, however, these fields are on the posterior half of each sternum, oval, and longer than wide. Furthermore, the lappets on the telopodites of the first maxillae are reduced in size in S. asiaeminoris but not in the other two species, and lappets also project from the coxosternite of the first maxillae in the other two species, but these additional lappets are absent in S. asiaeminoris.
