= Diphyonyx sukacevi =

Scientific classification
- Kingdom: Animalia
- Phylum: Arthropoda
- Subphylum: Myriapoda
- Class: Chilopoda
- Order: Geophilomorpha
- Family: Geophilidae
- Genus: Diphyonyx
- Species: D. sukacevi

Binomial name
- Diphyonyx sukacevi Bonato, Zapparoli, & Minelli, 2008 comb.n

Synonyms
- Brachygeophilus sukacevi (Folkmanová, 1956); Brachygeophilus sukacevi sukacevi (Folkmanová & Dobroruka, 1960)

Species of centipede

Diphyonyx sukacevi, formerly Brachygeophilus sukacevi, is a species of soil centipede in the family Geophilidae found in the most western part of the Caucasus range and the Manych valley north of the Caucasus. This species can reach 45 mm in length and is characterized by its 65–81 leg pairs, 5–7 slender filaments on the mid-part of the labrum, condyles between the anterior trunk sterna, and the lack of a single, isolated pore on each coxo-pleuron.
