= Tuoba tiosianus =

Scientific classification
- Kingdom: Animalia
- Phylum: Arthropoda
- Subphylum: Myriapoda
- Class: Chilopoda
- Order: Geophilomorpha
- Family: Geophilidae
- Genus: Tuoba
- Species: T. tiosianus

Binomial name
- Tuoba tiosianus (Takakuwa, 1934)

Synonyms
- Nesogeophilus tiosianus Verhoeff, 1924

Species of centipede

Tuoba tiosianus is a species of centipede in the Geophilidae family, described in 1934 by Japanese myriapodologist Yosioki Takakuwa.

== Description ==
The original description of this species is based on a female specimen measuring 20 mm in length with 53 pairs of legs.

== Distribution ==
The species occurs in Micronesia. The type locality is Tiba, Kapingamarangi, Pohnpei.
