= Schendyla dalmatica =

Scientific classification
- Kingdom: Animalia
- Phylum: Arthropoda
- Subphylum: Myriapoda
- Class: Chilopoda
- Order: Geophilomorpha
- Family: Schendylidae
- Genus: Schendyla
- Species: S. dalmatica

Binomial name
- Schendyla dalmatica Attems, 1904

Species of centipede

Schendyla dalmatica is a species of soil centipede in the family Schendylidae. This centipede is found in Montenegro and Croatia. This species is notable for its small size, reaching only 10 mm in length, which places this centipede among the smallest species in the genus Schendyla. This species also features a modest number of legs, only 37 pairs in males and 39 pairs in females.

== Discovery and taxonomy ==
This species was first described in 1904 by the Austrian myriapodologist Carl Attems based on a sample of specimens including both sexes. These specimens were found in what is now the town of Herceg Novi in Montenegro. Nineteen syntypes are deposited in the Natural History Museum in Vienna. Attems originally described this centipede under the name S. mediterranea dalmatica, as a subspecies of another species of Schendyla, but in 1929, he elevated S. dalmatica to the status of a separate species.

== Distribution and etymology ==
This species is only found in Montenegro and Croatia. The species name refers to the type locality, Herceg Novi, which is now in Montenegro but was formerly in Dalmatia. In Croatia, this species has been recorded near the city of Dubrovnik, which was formerly known as Ragusa.

== Description ==
This species reaches 10 mm in length and 0.5 mm in width. The male of this species features 37 leg pairs, whereas the female features 39 pairs. The body and the antennae are pale yellow, but the head is a brownish yellow. The dorsal plate on the head is slightly longer than wide and slightly wider in the rear than in the front, with a straight posterior margin and convex sides. Lappets are absent from the first maxillae. The claw on each of the second maxillae is long and slightly hooked at the distal end. The base of the ultimate article of the forcipule features a long pointed tooth, but the other articles lack teeth.

The sternites feature elongated fields of pores from the second segment through the ninth segment. These fields are forked at the anterior end, forming a Y shape. The basal element of the ultimate legs (coxopleuron) features two large pores hidden under the adjacent sternite. The most distal article of the ultimate legs is from three quarters to about as long as the penultimate article and lacks a claw.

This species exhibits many traits that characterize the genus Schendyla. For example, like other species in this genus, S. dalmatica features two large pores on the coxopleuron near the sternite of the last leg-bearing segment. Furthermore, like other species of Schendyla, this species lacks pores on the sternites of the posterior trunk segments.

This species shares a more distinctive set of traits with another species in the same genus, S. delicatula, a centipede found in Bulgaria. For example, in both species, the most distal article of the ultimate legs is about the same length as the penultimate article and lacks even a rudimentary claw. Furthermore, both species feature pores on the sternites on the most anterior segments behind the first trunk segment. Moreover, in both species, the first article of the forcipule lacks teeth.

These two species can be distinguished, however, based on other traits. For example, the first maxillae feature large lappets in S. deliculata, but these lappets are absent in S. dalmatica. Furthermore, the terminal element (pretarsus) of the second maxillae features a few spines in S. deliculata, but these spines are absent in S. dalmatica. Moreover, S. deliculata features more legs (for example, 47 pairs in the female) than S. dalmatica (with only 39 pairs in the female), and pore fields appear on sternites from the second segment through the fourteenth in S. deliculata but only from the second segment through the ninth in S. dalmatica.
