= Asanada agharkari =

Scientific classification
- Domain: Eukaryota
- Kingdom: Animalia
- Phylum: Arthropoda
- Subphylum: Myriapoda
- Class: Chilopoda
- Order: Scolopendromorpha
- Family: Scolopendridae
- Genus: Asanada
- Species: A. agharkari

Binomial name
- Asanada agharkari Gravely, 1912

Subspecies
- Asanada agharkari agharkari Gravely, 1912; Asanada agharkari singhbhumensis Gravely, 1912
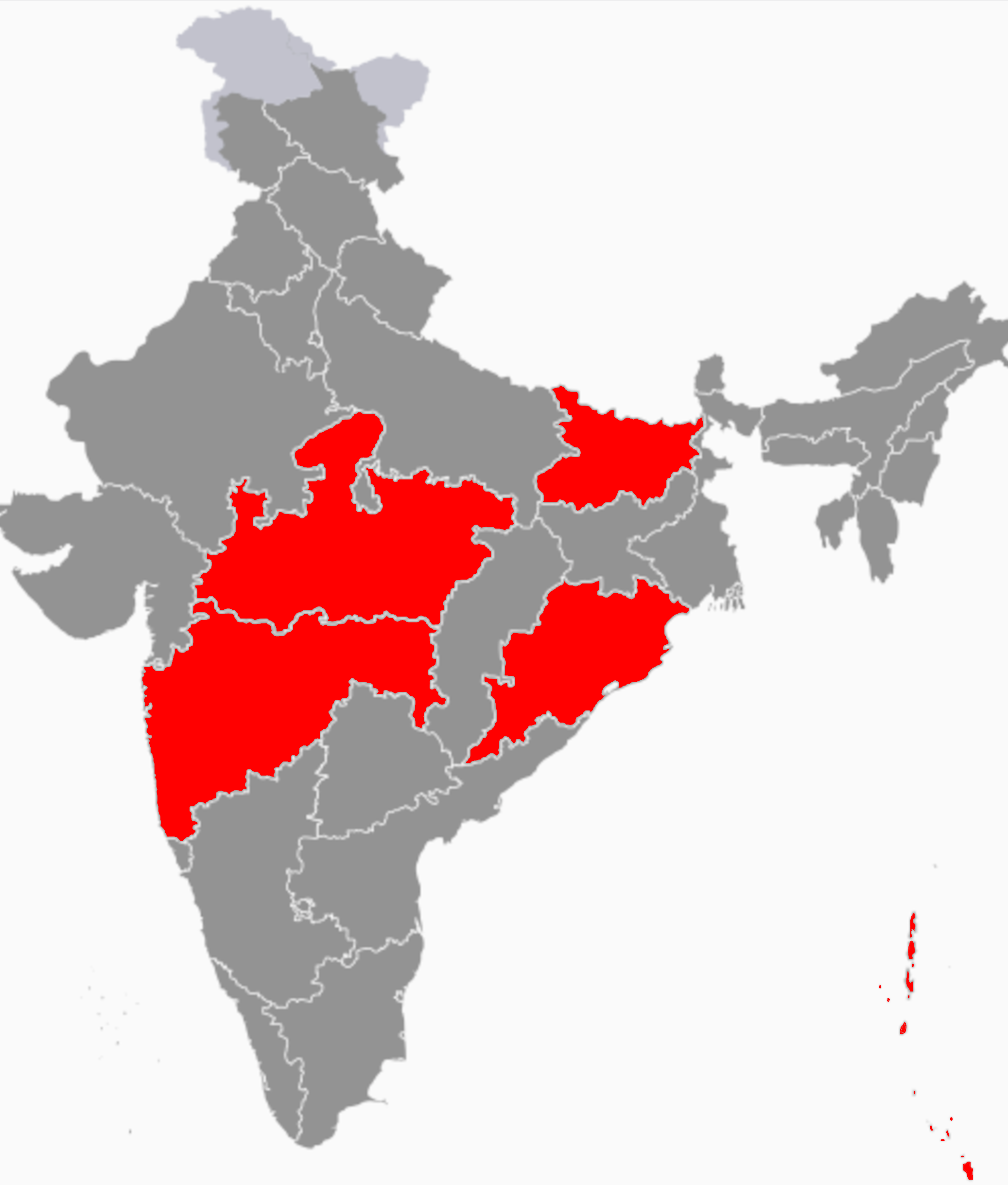

Centipede species

Asanada agharkari is a species of small Scolopendrid centipede in the subfamily Scolopendrinae.

== Appearance ==
Asanada agharkari is small, measuring between 13 and 32 mm (0.51 and 1.26 in) in length. The antennae have 17 articles, though Gravely initially described the species with 17-18. They are dark reddish-purple in colour, but fade to pale brown or grey when preserved in alcohol.

=== Subspecies ===
==== Asanada agharkari singhbhumensis ====
Asanada agharkari singhbhumensis is found in the Singhbhum district, and is distinguishable from A. a. agharkari only by colour; it is grey with a dark line down the middle of its trunk.

== Taxonomy ==
Asanada agharkari was initially described by Frederic Henry Gravely in 1912 in the seventh volume of the Records of the Indian Museum, a journal based in Calcutta. He gave it the genus name Pseudcryptops (Pocock, 1891), a name which has since been synonymized with Asanada, and also described two subspecies: A. a. agharkari and A. a. singhbhumensis. The last taxonomic review was done in 1978 by Jangi and Dass, in the same paper that synonymized Pseudocryptops with Asanada.

The type specimens are alcohol-preserved at the Zoological Survey of India in Calcutta. There is one adult and one juvenile, both are slightly damaged and have suffered decolourization due to long preservation.

== Distribution ==
A. agharkari is endemic to India and is found the Andaman and Nicobar Islands, as well as the states of Bihar, Maharashtra, Odisha (Orissa), and Madhya Pradesh. The type locality (of the lectotype) is Koyna Valley in the Western Ghats, in Satara District in Maharashtra.
