= Tuoba laticeps =

Scientific classification
- Kingdom: Animalia
- Phylum: Arthropoda
- Subphylum: Myriapoda
- Class: Chilopoda
- Order: Geophilomorpha
- Family: Geophilidae
- Genus: Tuoba
- Species: T. laticeps

Binomial name
- Tuoba laticeps (Pocock, 1891)

Synonyms
- Geophilus laticeps Pocock, 1891; Geophilus hartmeyeri Attems, 1911; Geophilus hartmeyeri Attems, 1914

Species of centipede

Tuoba laticeps is a species of centipede in the Geophilidae family. It is endemic to Australia, and was first described in 1891 by British zoologist Reginald Innes Pocock.

== Description ==
This species is orange yellow throughout and can reach up to 23 mm in length. Males of this species have 43 to 59 pairs of legs; females have 45 to 59 leg pairs.

== Distribution ==
The species occurs in Western Australia and Tasmania. The type locality is King Island in Bass Strait.

== Behaviour ==
The centipedes are solitary terrestrial predators that inhabit plant litter, soil and rotting wood.
