= Diphyonyx garutti =

Scientific classification
- Kingdom: Animalia
- Phylum: Arthropoda
- Subphylum: Myriapoda
- Class: Chilopoda
- Order: Geophilomorpha
- Family: Geophilidae
- Genus: Diphyonyx
- Species: D. garutti

Binomial name
- Diphyonyx garutti Bonato, Zapparoli, & Minelli, 2008 comb. n

Synonyms
- Brachygeophilus sukacevi garutti (Folkmanová and Dobroruka, 1960)

Species of centipede

Diphyonyx garutti, formerly Brachygeophilus sukacevi garutti, is a species of soil centipede in the family Geophilidae found in the most western part of the Caucasus range, north of the Black Sea. According to the original description, this species is characterized by 2–4 slender filaments on the mid-part of the labrum, condyles between the anterior trunk sterna, and a single, isolated pore on each coxo-pleuron. Since the original description based on 23 specimens in 1960, this species has not been recorded again.
