= Schendyla peyerimhoffi =

Scientific classification
- Kingdom: Animalia
- Phylum: Arthropoda
- Subphylum: Myriapoda
- Class: Chilopoda
- Order: Geophilomorpha
- Family: Schendylidae
- Genus: Schendyla
- Species: S. peyerimhoffi

Binomial name
- Schendyla peyerimhoffi Brölemann & Ribaut, 1911

Species of centipede

Schendyla peyerimhoffi is a species of soil centipede in the family Schendylidae. This centipede can reach 22 mm in length and features 37 to 49 pairs of legs. This species is found in coastal habitats from the Canary Islands to Germany.

== Discovery and distribution ==
This species was first described in 1911 by the French zoologists Henry W. Brölemann and Henri Ribaut. They based the original description of this species on a single immature male found in the province of Larache on the Atlantic coast of Morocco. This species is named for the French naturalist Paul de Peyerimhoff de Fontenelle, who collected this specimen.

After the original description of this species, ten specimens (seven males and three females) were described in 1952 from northern Portugal, then seven more specimens (one male and six females) were described in 1961 from southern England. This species has since been recorded elsewhere, including sites in the Canary Islands, Ireland, France, Spain, and Germany. In the British Isles, this centipede is found mostly in southwestern England, southern Wales, and the southern coast of Ireland, with only isolated records further north from the Isle of Man and the island of Anglesey. In France, this species was first recorded in 1987 in the department of Finistère in the region of Brittany, then observed in the departments of Manche and Calvados in the region of Normandy. In Spain, this species has been recorded near the town of Baiona in the autonomous community of Galicia. In Germany, this species has been recorded near the municipality of Dagebüll on the North Sea coast in the state of Schleswig-Holstein.

== Habitats ==
This species is known almost exclusively from littoral habitats, such as near estuaries or brackish water along the coast, or in coastal grassland by salt marshes. This centipede is typically found under small flat stones on estuarine mud or in rock crevices. This species has been found around the level of high tide and under stones covered with lichen in the Pelvetia zone. Although this centipede is a halophile in northwestern Europe, specimens were found far inland from the coast in Portugal. Some authorities, however, suggest that the Portuguese specimens may belong to a different species, citing differences in morphology.

== Description ==
This centipede is a very pale yellow, like straw, but the head is darker. Males of this species can feature 37 to 45 pairs of legs, whereas females can feature from 41 to 49 leg pairs. Adults range from 18 mm to 22 mm in length. The dorsal plate on the head (cephalic plate) is longer than wide, with a length/width ratio of about 1.1 or 1.2.

The clypeus features one pair of setae behind the antennae, one small pair in front of the labrum, and a row of at least four setae in between. The labrum usually features eight or nine median denticles rounded like tubercles, with two or three pointed lateral denticles on each side. Portuguese specimens, however, feature eleven to thirteen blunt denticles in the middle of the labrum. Each of the mandibles features a pectinate lamella and a dentate lamella, which usually bears six to eight teeth in a single block, but the dentate lamella can also bear eight teeth divided into three blocks, each with two or three teeth.

A lappet projects from the basal article of each telopodite of the first maxillae. The claws of the second maxillae are simple, concave like spoons, and lack spines. The claw on each of the forcipules features a node or denticle at the base and a concave inner edge with large crenulations that can take the form of teeth. All the other articles of the forcipule lack denticles.

The sternites feature fields of pores starting with the second leg-bearing segment and extending at least through the eleventh segment, sometimes through the twelfth segment, or further, through the thirteenth segment. These pore fields take the form of a narrow and elongated longitudinal band. The sternite of the last leg-bearing segment is shaped like a trapezoid that is about twice as wide as long. The basal element of each of the ultimate legs (coxopleuron) features two pores. The most distal article of each of the ultimate legs is short, only one fifth to one third as long as the penultimate article of the same leg. Each of the ultimate legs lacks a claw at the distal end, which may feature a small spine instead.

This centipede exhibits many traits that characterize the genus Schendyla. For example, like others in this genus, this species features two large pores on the coxopleuron. Furthermore, like others in this genus, this species lacks pores on the sternites of the posterior trunk segments.

This species shares an especially extensive set of distinctive traits with another species in the same genus, S. nemorensis, which is also found in Ireland, Great Britain, France, Germany, and Morocco. For example, both of these species lack denticles on the first article of the forcipule, feature lappets on the telopodites of the first maxillae, and feature second maxillae with simple claws that lack spines. Furthermore, like the species S. peyerimhoffi, the species S. nemorensis features undivided pore fields on the anterior sternites and can feature a mandible with six teeth in a single block on the dentate lamella. Moreover, these two species can reach similar sizes as adults and feature similar patterns of setae on the clypeus, pore fields on similar segments, and similar numbers of legs, with 37 to 45 leg pairs in S. nemorensis. These centipedes are so similar that some authorities suggest that they may be the same species.

These two similar species can be distinguished, however, based on other traits. For example, the concave surface of the forcipular claw is smooth in S. nemorensis but crenulated in S. peyerimhoffi. Furthermore, the pore field on the sternites is elongated to form a narrow longitudinal band in S. peyerimhoffi but not in S. nemorensis.

Some authorities also suggest that these two species can be distinguished based on the length of the most distal article on the ultimate legs. This article is short in S. peyerimhoffi, from one fifth to one third as long as the penultimate article on the same leg, but can be longer in S. nemorensis, from two fifths to three fifths as long as the penultimate article on the same leg. Other authorities describe the ultimate article as short in at least some specimens of S. nemorensis, however, as short as one third the length of the penultimate article on the same leg, or possibly even shorter, casting doubt on the diagnostic value of this proffered difference between these two species.
