= Reticulidia gofasi =

Scientific classification
- Kingdom: Animalia
- Phylum: Mollusca
- Class: Gastropoda
- Order: Nudibranchia
- Family: Phyllidiidae
- Genus: Reticulidia
- Species: R. gofasi

Binomial name
- Reticulidia gofasi Valdés & Ortea, 1996

Species of gastropod

Reticulidia gofasi is a species of sea slug, a dorid nudibranch, a shell-less marine gastropod mollusk in the family Phyllidiidae.

== Distribution ==
This species was described from a seamount at Josephine Bank 36°40.02′N 14°16.00′W in 200–205 m, with other specimens from different seamount locations in the NE Atlantic Ocean.

== Description ==
This nudibranch is pale yellow, with conical tubercles. It was placed in the genus Reticulidia because of the distinctive structure of the pharyngeal bulb.

== Diet ==
This species feeds on a sponge.
