= Tuoba pallida =

Scientific classification
- Kingdom: Animalia
- Phylum: Arthropoda
- Subphylum: Myriapoda
- Class: Chilopoda
- Order: Geophilomorpha
- Family: Geophilidae
- Genus: Tuoba
- Species: T. pallida

Binomial name
- Tuoba pallida Jones, 1998

Species of centipede

Tuoba pallida is a species of soil centipede in the Geophilidae family. This centipede is a littoral species endemic to Australia.

== Discovery ==
This species was first described in 1998 by R.E. Jones. The original description is based on a female holotype and six paratypes (two males and four females) found in 1980. The holotype and four of the paratypes were found in silver gull nest litter in Rockingham, on Penguin Island, near Perth, in Western Australia. The other two paratypes were found in coast shrub litter in Windy Harbour, south of Northcliffe, in Western Australia. All type specimens are deposited in the Western Australian Museum in Perth.

== Description ==
This species is white throughout and can reach up to 25 mm in length. Males of this species have 55 pairs of legs; females have 57 or 59 leg pairs. The body is sparsely covered with setae. The labrum has three pieces, with at least four teeth on the middle piece. The second maxillae feature claws that seem to end in a bristle and are surrounded by four or five setae. Pores appear in a circular group on the first segment but form a posterior band on all other segments. The ultimate legs are long and thin, about as long as the other legs, slightly swollen in the male, but less swollen in the female. Each of the ultimate legs has a claw at the distal end. This centipede can be readily identified based on its very pale pigmentation and long thin ultimate legs.

== Distribution ==
This species occurs in coastal south-west Western Australia.

== Behaviour ==
These centipedes are solitary terrestrial predators that inhabit plant litter and soil.
