= Schendyla armata =

Scientific classification
- Kingdom: Animalia
- Phylum: Arthropoda
- Subphylum: Myriapoda
- Class: Chilopoda
- Order: Geophilomorpha
- Family: Schendylidae
- Genus: Schendyla
- Species: S. armata

Binomial name
- Schendyla armata (Brölemann, 1901)

Synonyms
- Brachyschendyla armata broelemanni Verhoeff, 1934

Species of centipede

Schendyla armata is a species of soil centipede in the family Schendylidae. This centipede is found in France, Monaco, and Italy. This species is notable for its small size, reaching only 11 mm in length, and for a modest number of legs, with as few as 33 pairs of legs. The species name alludes to the first article of this centipede's forcipule, which is armed with an especially robust tooth.

== Discovery and distribution ==
This species was first described in 1901 by the French myriapodologist Henry W. Brölemann. He based the original description of this species on a single specimen collected from moss in the commune of Sospel in the Alpes-Maritimes department in southeastern France. Other specimens were soon found at other sites along the French Riviera from the city of Cannes to the commune of Menton, including the principality of Monaco. This species is known in France only from this coastal zone of the Alpes-Maritimes department. After 1934, this species was not recorded in France again until the discovery of another specimen in 2021 in the vicinity of Mercantour National Park in Sospel. In the meantime, this species was discovered in Italy, first at several sites on the island of Sardinia, then in the comune of Prato in the region of Tuscany, and then near the comune of Tuscania in the region of Lazio.

== Taxonomy ==
Brölemann originally described this centipede in 1901 as Schendyla armata. In 1912, however, he and the French zoologist Henri Ribaut placed this species in the genus Brachyschendyla rather than the genus Schendyla. Moreover, Brölemann and Ribaut introduced Microschendyla as a subgenus in the genus Brachyschendyla and included Brachyschendyla armata in this proposed subgenus. In 1934, the German zoologist Karl W. Verhoeff described Brachyschendyla (Microschendyla) armata brölemanni as a subspecies of Brachyschendyla (Microschendyla) armata, based on a single female specimen found in the Carei valley near Menton in France. Since then, authorities have not only deemed both Brachyschendyla and Brachyschendyla (Microschendyla) to be junior synonyms of Schendyla but also deemed Brachyschendyla (Microschendyla) armata brölemanni to be a junior synonym of S. armata rather than a valid subspecies. Authorities now accept S. armata as the valid name for this species and reject the proposed subspecies.

== Ecology and habitats ==
This species favors warm temperatures and sclerophyllous woodlands. This centipede is found in Mediterranean oak forests, typically among Quercus ilex and Q. suber, and maquis shrubland, where specimens can be found in humus and under leaf litter, stones, or moss. This centipede is known only from relatively low elevations. In Italy, for example, this species has been recorded only at elevations from sea level up to 400 meters. In Italy, this centipede has been found in nature reserves or other areas with little urban development, but along the French Riviera, intense urban development threatens the woodland habitats favored by this species.

== Description ==
This centipede is small, with adults ranging from 5 mm to 11 mm in length. The body is nearly white with a faint tinge of orange at the anterior end. This species can feature from 33 to 41 pairs of legs, but specimens usually feature no more than 39 pairs. Females have been recorded with as few as 33 leg pairs, a number once considered such an outlier as to suggest a distinct subspecies. Other females have been recorded with as many as 39 leg pairs, and males have been recorded with 35 to 41 leg pairs.

The dorsal plate on the head (cephalic plate) is longer than wide, with a length/width ratio ranging from 1.2 to 1.45. The clypeus features a anterior pair of setae behind the antennae, followed by a row of four more setae. The labrum features six median denticles rounded like tubercles, with two slightly pointed lateral denticles on each side. Each of the mandibles features a dentate lamella with six teeth in a single block. The first maxillae feature two pairs of lappets, all small and pointed, with one pair on the telopodites and another pair on the coxosternite near the base of these telopodites.

The first article of each of the forcipules features a long denticle at the distal end of the inner margin, but no denticles appear on the other articles. The claw at the end of each forcipule features a slight swelling at the base. In some specimens, a second denticle appears on the first article of the forcipule, in the middle of the inner margin, shorter than the long distal denticle. Some authorities considered this trait to be significant enough to indicate a distinct subspecies for these specimens. Other specimens feature either a relatively straight inner margin or a shallow bulge instead of a distinct second tooth in the middle of the first article, however, suggesting various degrees of intraspecific variation in the form of this article.

The sternites feature no fields of pores. The main sternite of the last leg-bearing segment is shaped like a trapezoid with the anterior margin not only wider than the posterior margin but also twice as wide as the length of the sternite. The basal element of each of the ultimate legs (coxopleuron) features two large pores. Each of the ultimate legs ends with a terminal article that is at least as long as the penultimate article of the same leg. The claw at the end of each of the ultimate legs is either reduced to a small spine or entirely absent.

This centipede shares many traits with other species in the genus Schendyla. For example, like others in this genus, this species features two pores on each coxopleuron. Furthermore, like others in this genus, this species lacks pores on the sternites of the posterior trunk segments.

This species shares an especially distinctive set of traits with another species in the same genus, S. dentata, which is also found in France. For example, in both of these species, a robust denticle projects from the distal end of the first article of the forcipule. Furthermore, both species lack pore fields on all sternites. Moreover, the species S. dentata is also small, with adults ranging from 9 mm to 12 mm in length, and like the species S. armata, includes females with 39 leg pairs.

These two similar species can be distinguished, however, based on other traits. For example, the terminal article of the ultimate legs is short in S. dentata, only one-seventh as long as the penultimate article of the same leg, but longer in S. armata, at least as long as the penultimate article of the same leg. Furthermore, the claw on the forcipule features a long sharp denticle in S. dentata but not in S. armata.
