= Tuoba sydneyensis =

Scientific classification
- Kingdom: Animalia
- Phylum: Arthropoda
- Subphylum: Myriapoda
- Class: Chilopoda
- Order: Geophilomorpha
- Family: Geophilidae
- Genus: Tuoba
- Species: T. sydneyensis

Binomial name
- Tuoba sydneyensis (Pocock, 1891)

Synonyms
- Geophilus sydneyensis Pocock, 1891; Honuaphilus alohanus Chamberlin, 1926; Tuoba curticeps Chamberlin, 1920; Algerophilus leptochilus Brolemann, 1931

Species of centipede

Tuoba sydneyensis is a species of centipede in the Geophilidae family. It was first described in 1891 by British zoologist Reginald Innes Pocock.

== Description ==
This species is orange yellow throughout, can reach up to 32 mm in length, and ranges from 39 to 55 pairs of legs (39 to 49 in males, 41 to 55 in females).

== Distribution ==
The species occurs in Western Australia and New South Wales as well as Seychelles, New Guinea, New Caledonia, the Solomon Islands and the Hawaiian Islands. The type locality is Double Bay, Port Jackson, in Sydney.

== Behaviour ==
The centipedes are solitary terrestrial predators that inhabit plant litter, soil and rotting wood.
