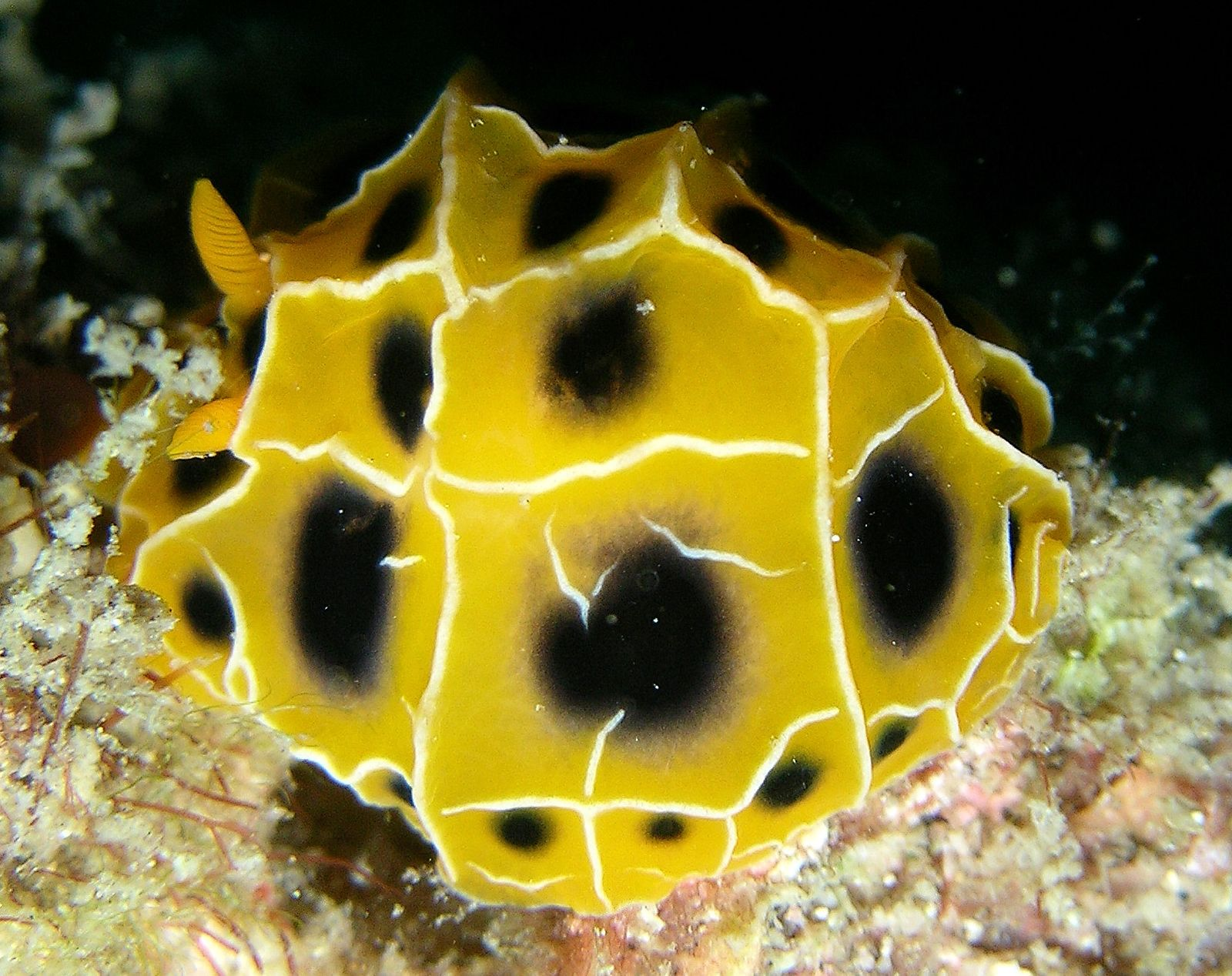
- Reticulidia suzanneae

Scientific classification
- Kingdom: Animalia
- Phylum: Mollusca
- Class: Gastropoda
- Order: Nudibranchia
- Family: Phyllidiidae
- Genus: Reticulidia; Brunckhorst, 1990

= Reticulidia =

Genus of gastropods

Reticulidia is a genus of sea slugs, dorid nudibranchs, shell-less marine gastropod molluscs in the family Phyllidiidae.

== Species ==
Species in the genus Reticulidia include:

- Reticulidia fungia Brunckhorst & Gosliner in Brunckhorst, 1993
- Reticulidia gofasi Valdés & Ortea, 1996
- Reticulidia halgerda Brunckhorst & Burn, 1990
- Reticulidia suzanneae Valdes & Behrens, 2002
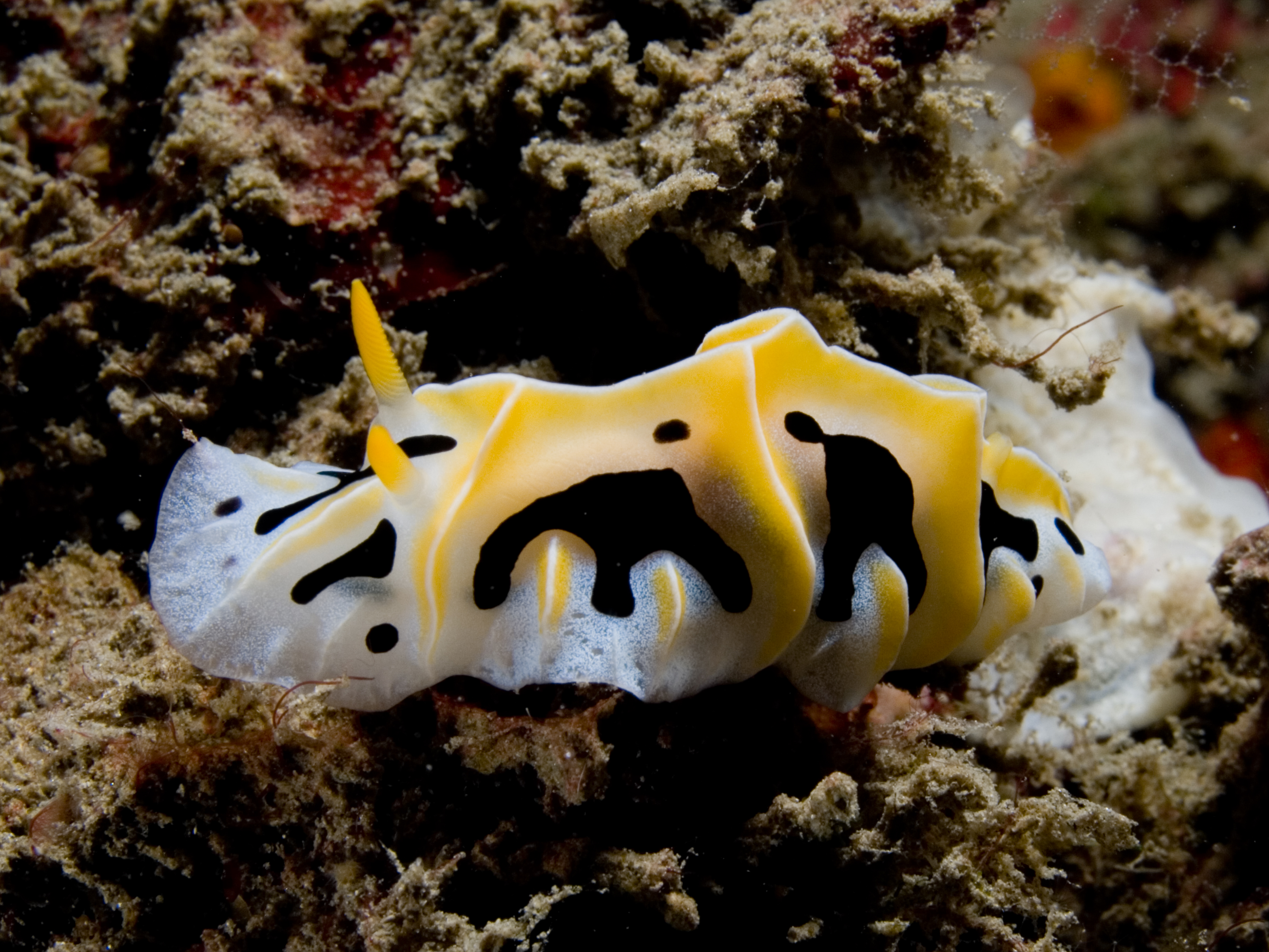
Reticulidia fungia

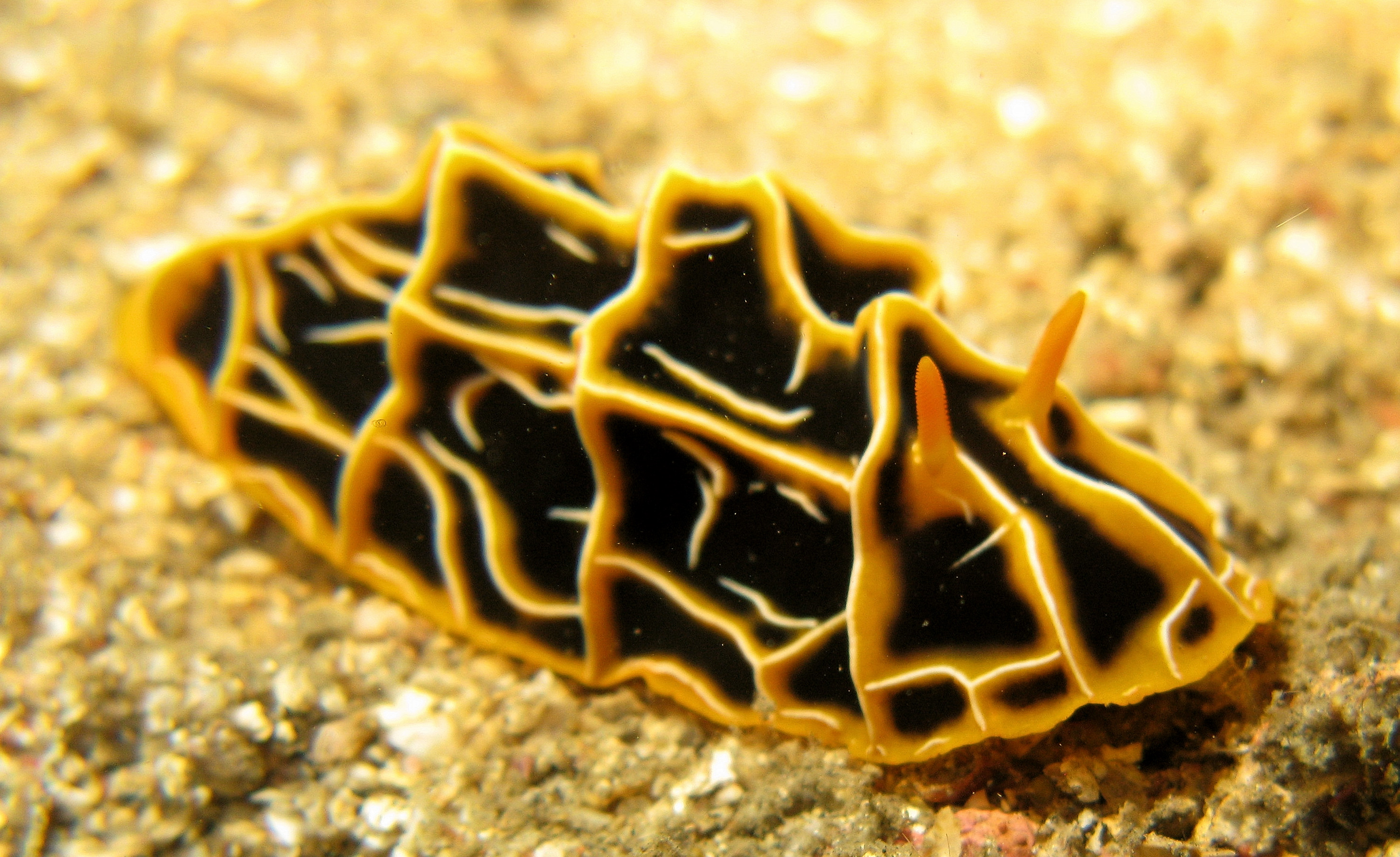
Reticulidia halgerda

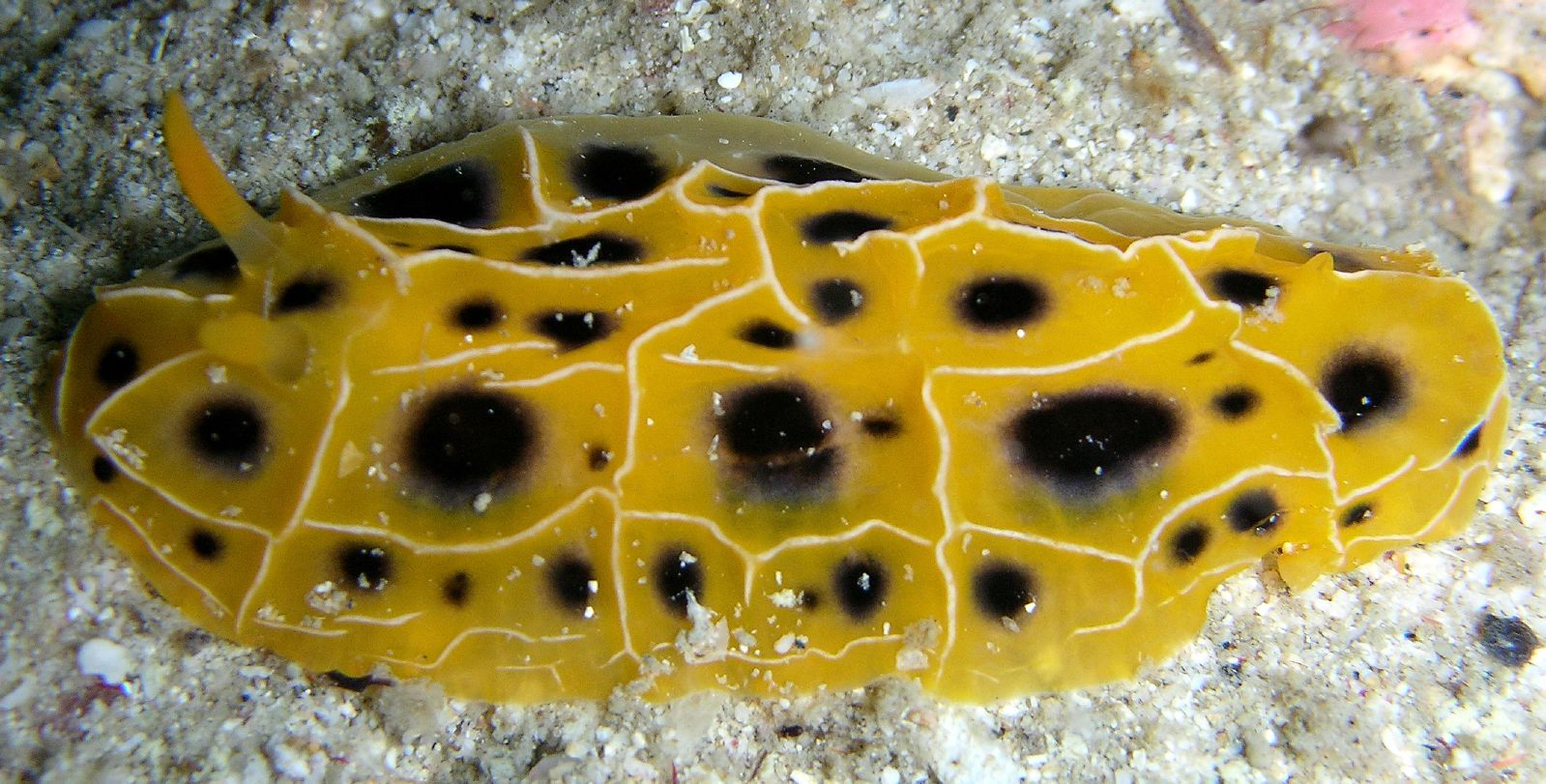
Reticulidia suzanneae
