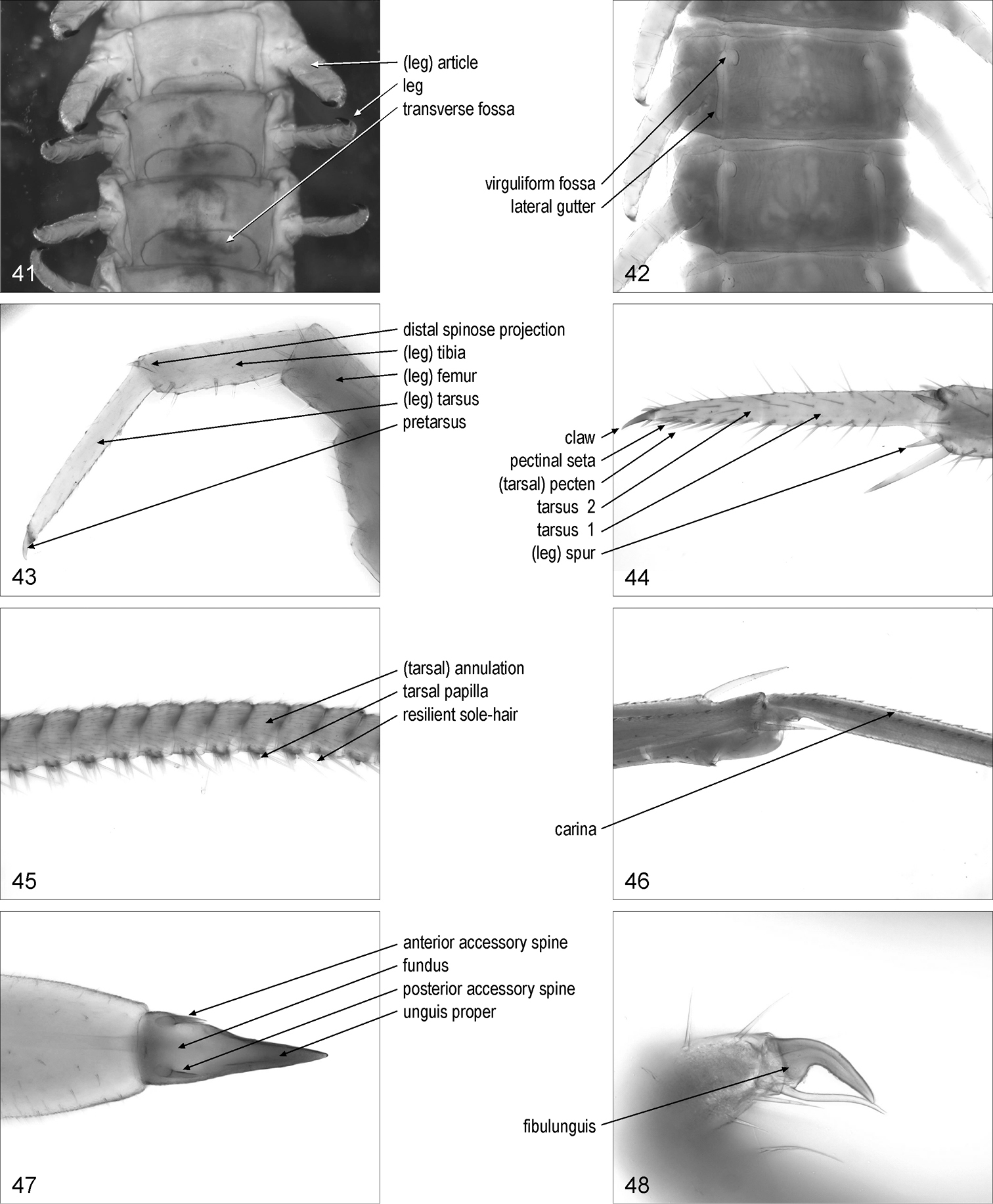
- Anatomy of the Diphyonyx conjungens

Scientific classification
- Kingdom: Animalia
- Phylum: Arthropoda
- Subphylum: Myriapoda
- Class: Chilopoda
- Order: Geophilomorpha
- Family: Geophilidae
- Genus: Diphyonyx
- Species: D. conjungens

Binomial name
- Diphyonyx conjungens (Verhoeff, 1898)

Synonyms
- Geophilus conjungens (Verhoeff, 1898)

= Diphyonyx conjungens =

Species of centipede

Diphyonyx conjungens, formerly Geophilus conjungens, is a species of soil centipede in the family Geophilidae that has been recorded in the Balkan Peninsula, Anatolia, the southern Sporades islands, the most eastern parts of Turkish Armenia, the Pontic and Tauric mountains, and Crimea. It grows up to 60 millimeters long and bears 69–81 leg pairs in females, 67–79 in males, as well as 1–2 stout tubercles and 2–4 slender filaments on the mid-part of the labrum, an absence of condyles between the anterior trunk sterna, and a single, isolated pore on each coxo-pleuron.
