= Meinert =

Meinert is a surname. Notable people with the surname include:

- Curtis L. Meinert (1934–2023), American clinical trialist
- Dale Meinert (1933–2004), American football player
- Frederik Vilhelm August Meinert (1833–1912), Danish zoologist
- Maren Meinert (born 1973), German footballer
- Niklas Meinert (born 1981), German field hockey player
- Walt Meinert (1890–1958), American baseball player

== See also ==
- Meinert, Missouri
