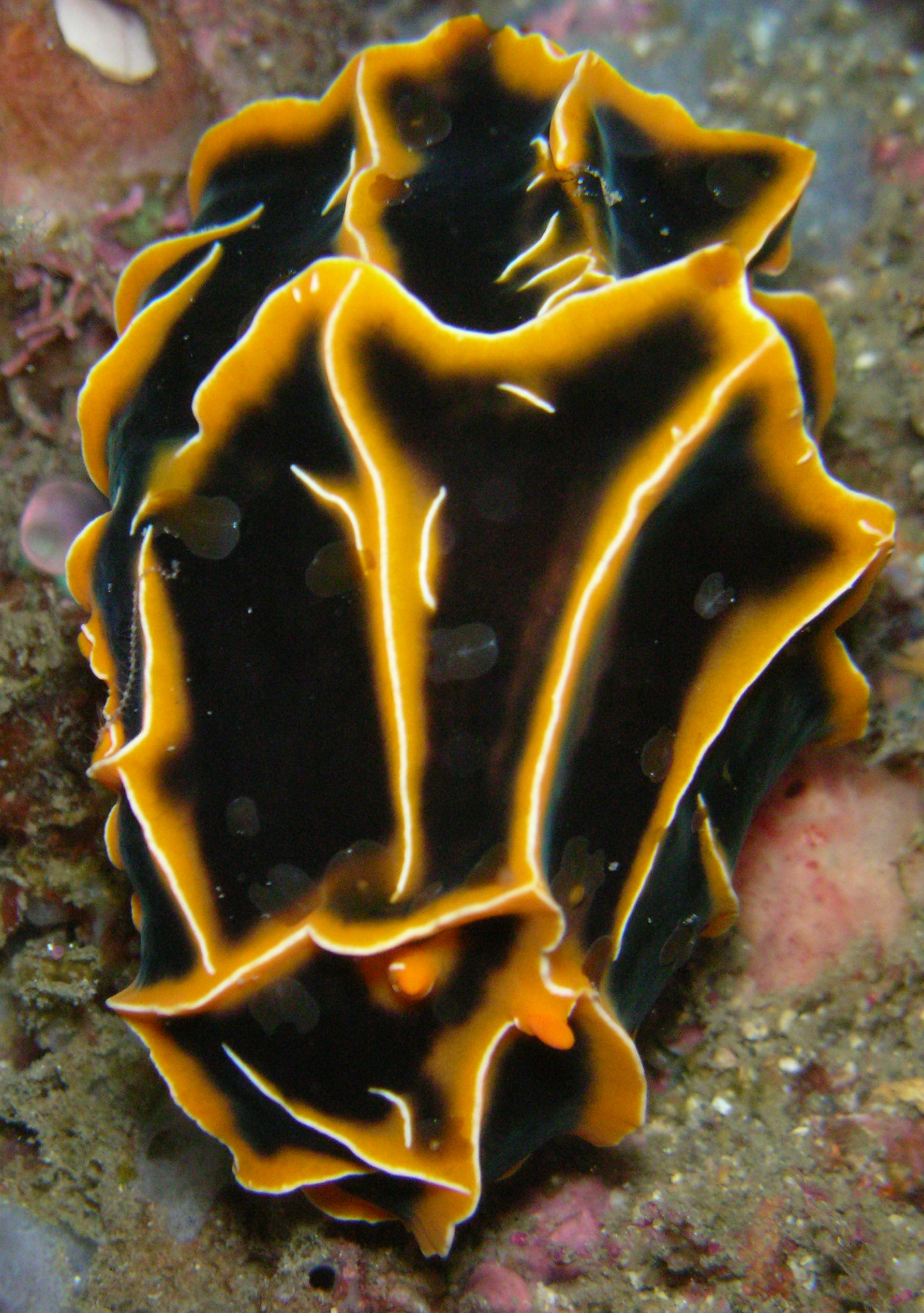
- Reticulidia halgerda, head end at the front

Scientific classification
- Kingdom: Animalia
- Phylum: Mollusca
- Class: Gastropoda
- Order: Nudibranchia
- Family: Phyllidiidae
- Genus: Reticulidia
- Species: R. halgerda

Binomial name
- Reticulidia halgerda Brunckhorst & Burn in Brunckhorst, 1990

= Reticulidia halgerda =

Species of gastropod

Reticulidia halgerda is a species of sea slug, a dorid nudibranch, a shell-less marine gastropod mollusk in the family Phyllidiidae.

== Description ==
Reticulidia halgerda grows to a maximum length of 7.0 cm. This species is different externally and internally from species in the Phyllidia and Phyllidiopsis genera, both of which also have yellow coloration and tuberculate ridges. Reticulidia halgerda does not have spiculose tubercles but instead has reticulate ridges on the notum that are smooth. Phyllidia ocellata, Phyllidia tula, Phyllidia varicosa, and Phyllidia coelestis all have a different foregut as well as tubercles capped with yellow coloration. Furthermore, unlike Reticulidia fungia, Reticulidia halgerda does not possess a broad bluish white border.

== Distribution ==
This species is found in numerous locations in the central and western Pacific Ocean, including East Australia, Taiwan, the Philippines, Indonesia, the Marshall Islands, and Fiji.
