= Vilhelm Bergsøe =

Danish author and scientist (1835–1911)

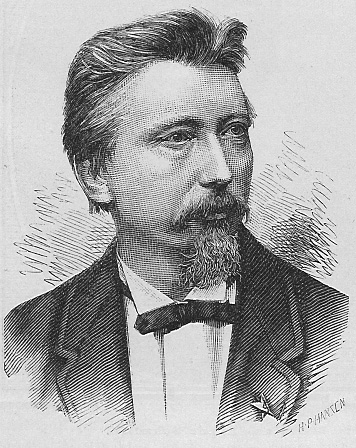

Jørgen Vilhelm Bergsøe (8 February 1835 - 26 June 1911) was a Danish entomologist who moved to Italy and became a novelist and poet.

Bergsøe was born in Copenhagen, son of the director of the royal porcelain factory in Købmagergade, Carl Wilhelm Bergsøe, and Louise Sophie Bech. After the death of his mother he was sent to study at the Østre Borgerdydskolen in Christianshavn. He then went to the University of Copenhagen and studied natural sciences, specializing in entomology and graduated in 1860 with a thesis was on a parasitic copepod Philichthys xiphiae described by Japetus Steenstrup. He suffered from rheumatic fever and other medical problems. He later published a book on Pictures of Insect Life from Field and Wood (Fra Mark og Skov. Billeder af Insekternes Liv i ny Bearbejdelse, 1915) and various papers, such as on centipedes, describing several new species. He suffered from poor eyesight, and unable to use the microscope, he gave up entomology, and moved to Italy for better health and stayed on in Rome, Naples and Sicily writing historically located novels in the style of M. A. Goldschmidt such as Italienske noveller ("Italian novels", 1874), Fra den gamble fabrik ("From the old factory", 1869 ); and Rom under Pius den niende ("Rome under Pius IX", 1877). While in Italy he met Henrik Ibsen. He also took an interest in coins and seals, writing on them. He published a series of poetry writings in seven volumes from 1905 to 1907.
