= Diphyonyx =

Scientific classification
- Kingdom: Animalia
- Phylum: Arthropoda
- Subphylum: Myriapoda
- Class: Chilopoda
- Order: Geophilomorpha
- Family: Geophilidae
- Genus: Diphyonyx; Bonato, Zapparoli, & Minelli, 2008

Genus of centipedes

Diphyonyx is a genus of soil centipedes in the family Geophilidae found in the Palearctic region. They are notable for the unusually shaped claws on the anterior part of the trunk, which are swollen and have anterior spurs enlarged into elongate projections. Centipedes in this genus have a forcipular coxosternite with a pair of anterior tubercles and feature no sternal pores. Most coxal organs open into a single pit on each coxopleuron. These centipedes range from 4 cm to 6 cm in length and have 65 to 81 pairs of legs.

== Etymology ==
From Ancient Greek “diphyés” meaning "of double nature", and “ónyx, ónychos” meaning "claw", referring to the bipartite shape of the pretarsus of the legs on the anterior part of the trunk.

== Species ==
Species in this genus include:

- Diphyonyx conjungens (Verhoeff 1898)
- Diphyonyx garutti (Folkmanová and Dobroruka, 1960)
- Diphyonyx sukacevi (Folkmanová, 1956)
