= Tuoba (centipede) =

Scientific classification
- Kingdom: Animalia
- Phylum: Arthropoda
- Subphylum: Myriapoda
- Class: Chilopoda
- Order: Geophilomorpha
- Family: Geophilidae
- Genus: Tuoba; Chamberlin, 1920

Type species
- Tuoba curticeps Chamberlin,1920

Synonyms
- Honuaphilus Chamberlin, 1926; Nesogeophilus Verhoeff, 1924

Genus of centipedes

Tuoba is a genus of 17 species of centipedes, in the family Geophilidae. This genus was described by American biologist Ralph Vary Chamberlin in 1920. These centipedes are found in coastal regions and islands in the Mediterranean and in the Atlantic, Pacific, and Indian oceans.

== Description ==
Centipedes in this genus feature short forcipules with a denticle at the base of each tarsungulum, anterior trunk metasternites with an anterior medial socket and a posterior transverse band of pores, and leg claws with an especially elongate basal spine; the coxal organs open into a single ventral pit on each coxopleuron. These centipedes range from about 2 cm to about 5 cm in length and have 39 to 73 pairs of legs. The Japanese species Tuoba japonicus, with 41 to 51 leg pairs in each sex, is notable for its small size, reaching a maximum length of only 17 mm. The species T. sydneyensis can reach 32 mm in length but can also have as few as 39 leg pairs, the minimum number recorded in this genus. The species T. xylophaga, found in New Zealand, is notable for its large size (reaching 45 mm in length) and its many legs (from 57 to 67 pairs). An undescribed species of Tuoba discovered on Prime Seal Island has 73 leg pairs, the maximum number recorded in this genus.

== Species ==
Valid species:

- Tuoba ashmoleorum Lewis, 1996
- Tuoba baeckstroemi (Verhoeff K.W., 1924)
- Tuoba benoiti (Matic & Darabantu, 1977)
- Tuoba culebrae (Silvestri, 1908)
- Tuoba hartmeyeri (Attems, 1911)
- Tuoba japonicus (Fahlander, 1935)
- Tuoba kozuensis (Takakuwa, 1934)
- Tuoba laticeps (Pocock, 1891)
- Tuoba laticollis (Attems, 1903)
- Tuoba littoralis (Takakuwa, 1934)
- Tuoba pallida Jones, 1998
- Tuoba poseidonis (Verhoeff, 1901)
- Tuoba sudanensis (Lewis, 1963)
- Tuoba sydneyensis (Pocock, 1891)
- Tuoba tiosianus (Takakuwa, 1934)
- Tuoba xylophaga (Attems, 1903)
- Tuoba zograffi (Brölemann, 1900)
