= Frederik Vilhelm August Meinert =

Danish arachnologist and editor

Frederik Vilhelm August Meinert (1833, in Copenhagen – 1912), was a Danish arachnologist and editor of the first series of Entomologiske Meddelelser.

Meinert initially studied theology . Later he was a pupil of Jørgen Matthias Christian Schiødte and he too became Inspektor at the Zoological Museum in Copenhagen. Meinert specialised in comparative anatomy and histology mainly of Malacostraca and Pycnogonida .

== Works ==
- Symbolæ ad monographiam Cymotharum Crustaceorum Isopodum familiæ (1879) with Schiødte
- Fluernes munddele trophi dipterorumKjobenhavn: H. Hagerups boghandel (1881).
- Crustacea malacostraca. Det Videnskabelige Udbytte af Kanonbaaden "Hauchs" Togter 3: 147–230 (1890)
- Pycnogonida: af Fr. Meinert. Bianco Luno (1899)

Species named for him are Clypeoniscus meinerti Giard & Bonnier, 1895, Laothoes meinerti Boeck, 1871, Paralaophonte meinerti(Brady, 1899) and Neosarmatium meinerti(De Man).
