= Lamella (surface anatomy) =

Anatomical structure

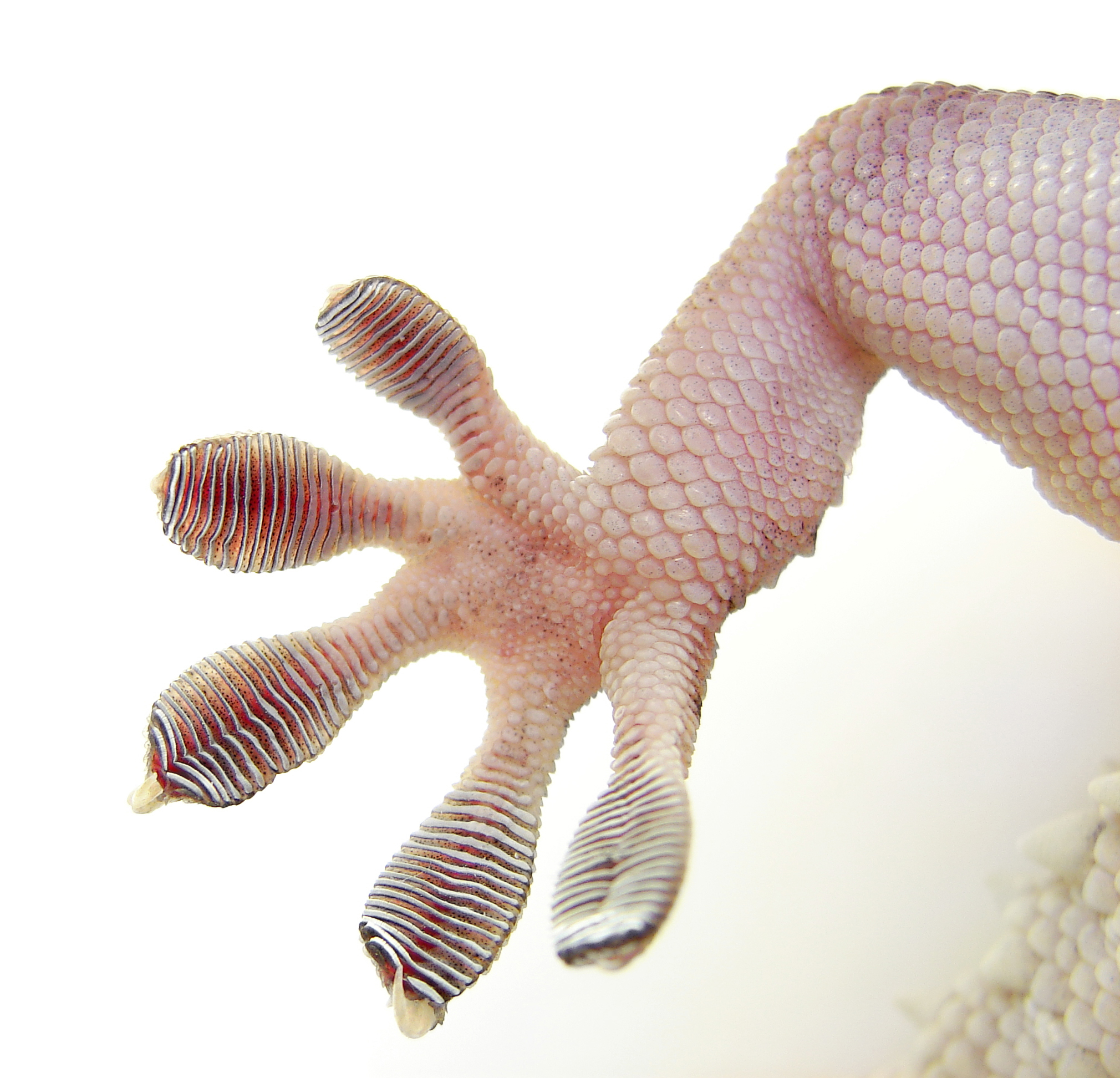
Lamellae on a gecko's foot.

In surface anatomy, a lamella is a thin plate-like structure, often one amongst many lamellae very close to one another, with open space between. Aside from respiratory organs such as book lungs, they appear in other biological roles including filter feeding and the traction surfaces of geckos.

== Reptiles ==
Gecko feet consist of millions of setae made of β-keratin arranged into lamellate structures called spatula, which allow adhesion to walls due to creating more Van der Waals force between the gecko's feet and the wall.

== Fish gill ==
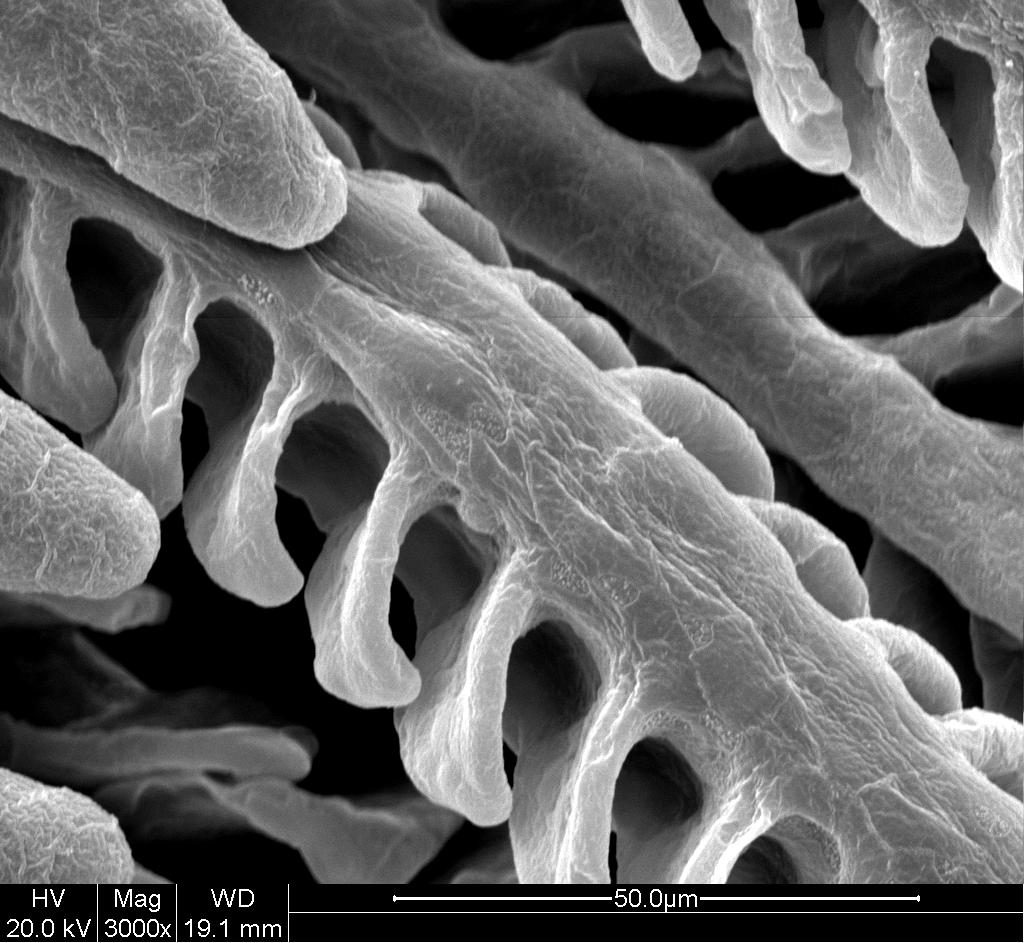
Scanning electron microscopy image of the gill filament and lamellae from an 18-day-old larval Yellowfin Tuna (Thunnus albacores).

In fish, gill lamellae are used to increase the surface area in contact with the environment to maximize gas exchange (both to attain oxygen and to expel carbon dioxide) between the water and the blood. In fish gills, there are two types of lamellae, primary and secondary. The primary gill lamellae (also called gill filament) extends from the gill arch, and the secondary gill lamellae extends from the primary gill lamellae. Gas exchange primarily occurs at the secondary gill lamellae, where the tissue is notably only one cell layer thick. Furthermore, countercurrent gas exchange at the secondary gill lamellae further maximizes oxygen uptake and carbon dioxide release. These gill lamellae are larger and have smaller pores in faster-swimming fish compared to slower-swimming fish.

== Insects ==
In insects, some species feature antennae with a lamellate structure such as the members of the Scarabaeidae family. These antennae, covered in fine hairs (setae), are used to detect female pheromones, temperature, humidity, and to touch nearby objects.

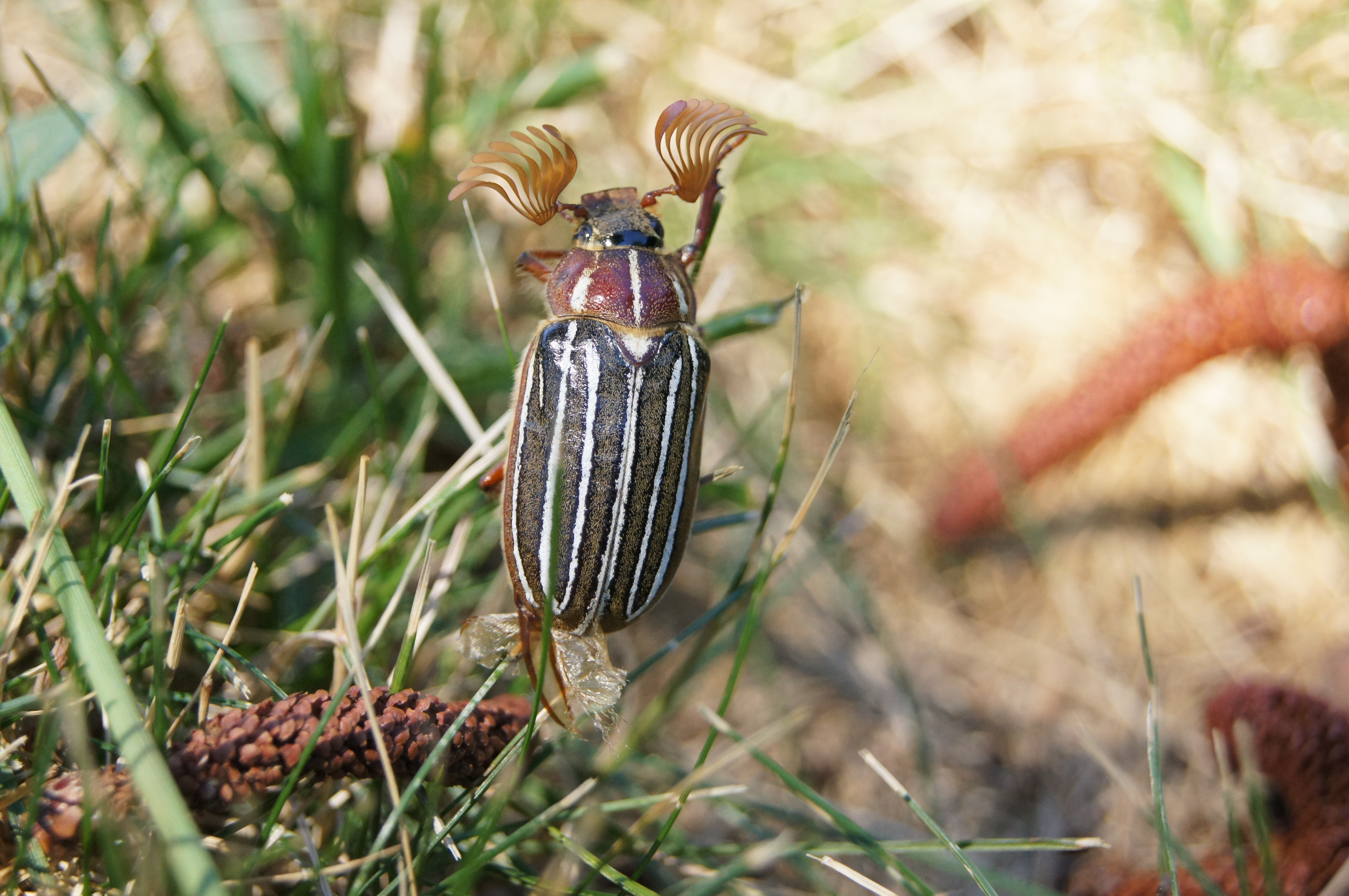
Ten-Lined June Beetle with lamellate antennae on display

== See also ==
- Pecten (biology) – the similar structure in birds
