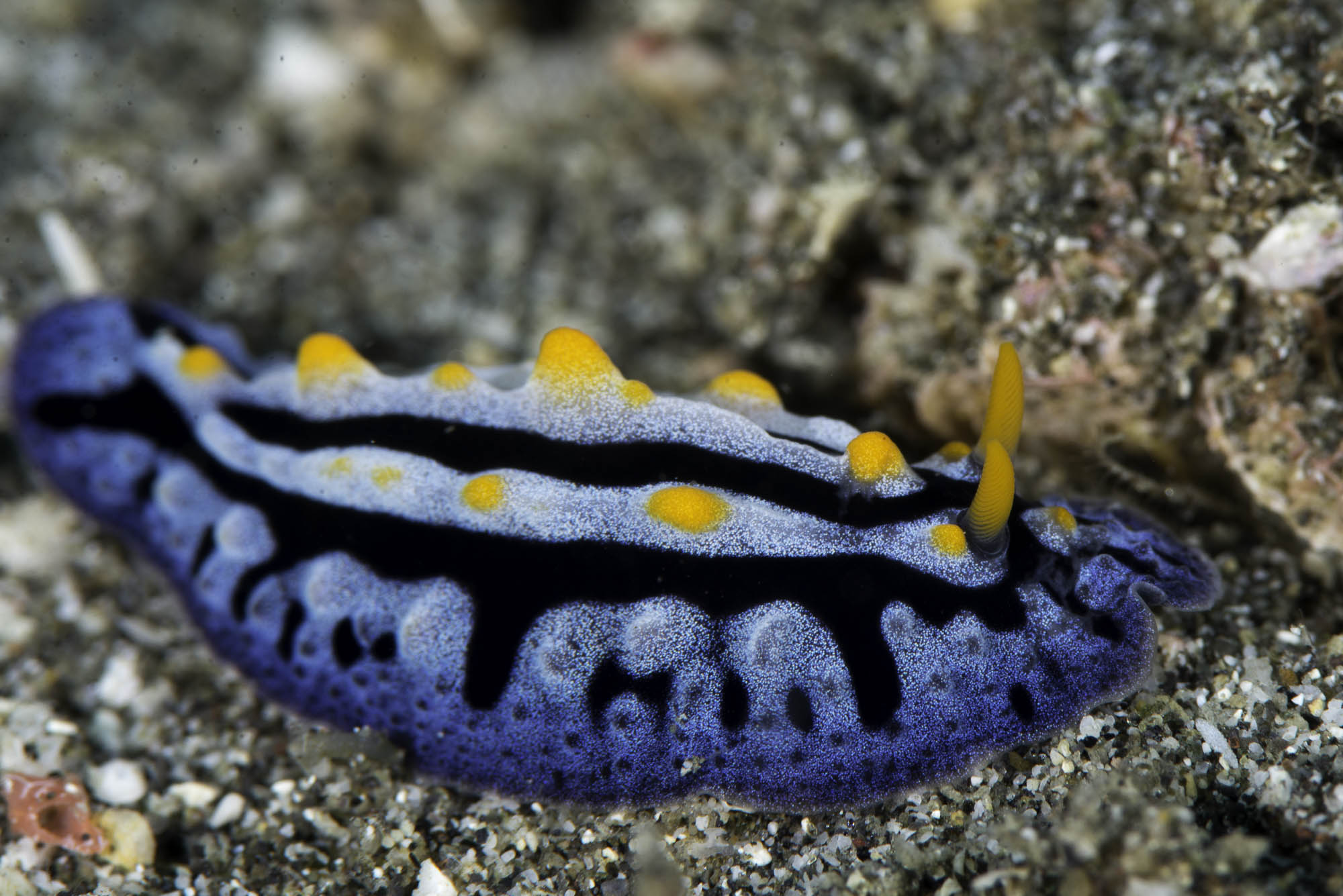
- The nudibranch Phyllidia haegeli, Padangbai, Bali.

Scientific classification
- Kingdom: Animalia
- Phylum: Mollusca
- Class: Gastropoda
- Order: Nudibranchia
- Family: Phyllidiidae
- Genus: Phyllidia
- Species: P. haegeli

Binomial name
- Phyllidia haegeli (Fahrner & Beck, 2000)

Synonyms
- Fryeria haegeli Fahrner & Beck, 2000

= Phyllidia haegeli =

Species of gastropod

Phyllidia haegeli is a species of sea slug, a dorid nudibranch, a shell-less marine gastropod mollusk in the family Phyllidiidae.

== Distribution ==
This species was described from Trawangan slope reef, Gili Trawangan, Lombok, Indonesia. It also occurs in Bali and Anilao in the Philippines.

== Description ==
This nudibranch has a blue background to the dorsum, becoming darker at the margin. It has a pattern of four longitudinal black lines on the dorsum separating three ridges with tall yellow-capped tubercles surrounded by pale blue. At the edge of the mantle there are vertical lines of smaller tubercles with darker centres with broken black lines between them. The rhinophores are yellow. It is similar in appearance to Phyllidia coelestis, Phyllidia varicosa and Phyllidia picta.

== Diet ==
This species feeds on a sponge.
