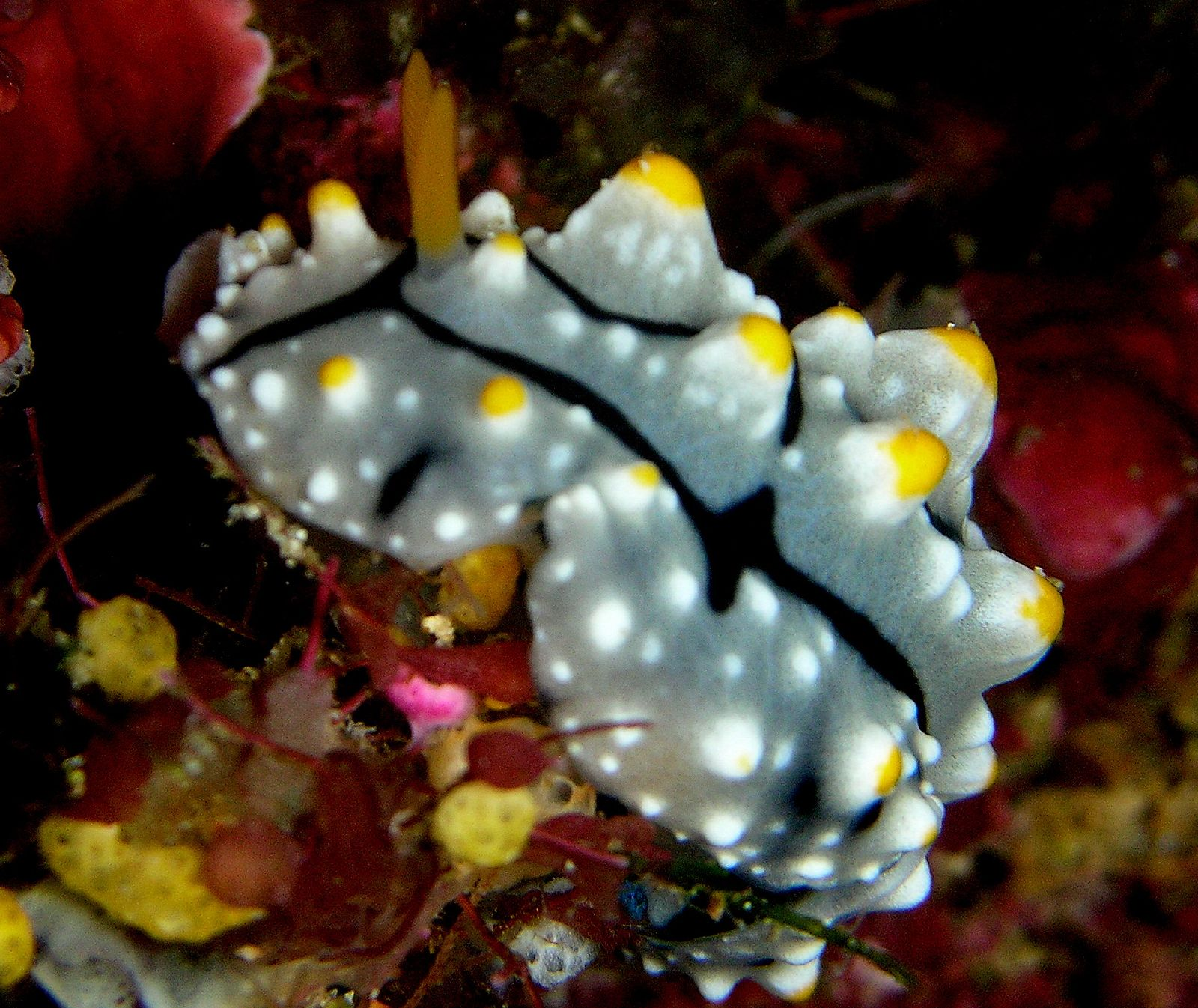
- A live individual of Phyllidia elegans in situ, head end towards the left

Scientific classification
- Kingdom: Animalia
- Phylum: Mollusca
- Class: Gastropoda
- Order: Nudibranchia
- Family: Phyllidiidae
- Genus: Phyllidia; Cuvier, 1797

Type species
- Phyllidia varicosa Lamarck, 1801

Synonyms
- Fryeria Gray, 1853; Phyllidia (Fryeria) Gray, 1853· accepted, alternate representation; Phyllidia (Phyllidia) Cuvier, 1797; Reyfria Yonow, 1986

= Phyllidia =

Genus of gastropods

Phyllidia is a genus of nudibranchs that belongs to the family Phyllidiidae.

== Species ==
Species in the genus Phyllidia include:

- Phyllidia alyta Yonow, 1996
- Phyllidia babai Brunckhorst, 1993
- Phyllidia carlsonhoffi Brunckhorst, 1993
- Phyllidia coelestis Bergh, 1905
- Phyllidia elegans Bergh, 1869
- Phyllidia exquisita Brunckhorst, 1993
- Phyllidia flava Aradas, 1847
- Phyllidia goslineri Brunckhorst, 1993
- Phyllidia guamensis (Brunckhorst, 1993)
- Phyllidia haegeli (Fahrner & Beck, 2000)
- Phyllidia koehleri Perrone, 2000
- Phyllidia larryi (Brunckhorst, 1993)
- Phyllidia madangensis Brunckhorst, 1993
- Phyllidia marindica (Yonow & Hayward, 1991)
- Phyllidia multituberculata C.R. Boettger, 1918
- Phyllidia ocellata Cuvier, 1804
- Phyllidia orstomi Valdés, 2001
- Phyllidia ovata (Yonow & Wägele, 2025)
- Phyllidia picta Pruvot-Fol, 1957
- Phyllidia polkadotsa Brunckhorst, 1993
- Phyllidia rueppelii (Bergh, 1869)
- Phyllidia scottjohnsoni Brunckhorst, 1993
- Phyllidia tula Marcus & Marcus, 1970
- Phyllidia undula Yonow, 1990
- Phyllidia varicosa Lamarck, 1801 - (type species)
- Phyllidia willani Brunckhorst, 1993
- Phyllidia zebrina Baba, 1976
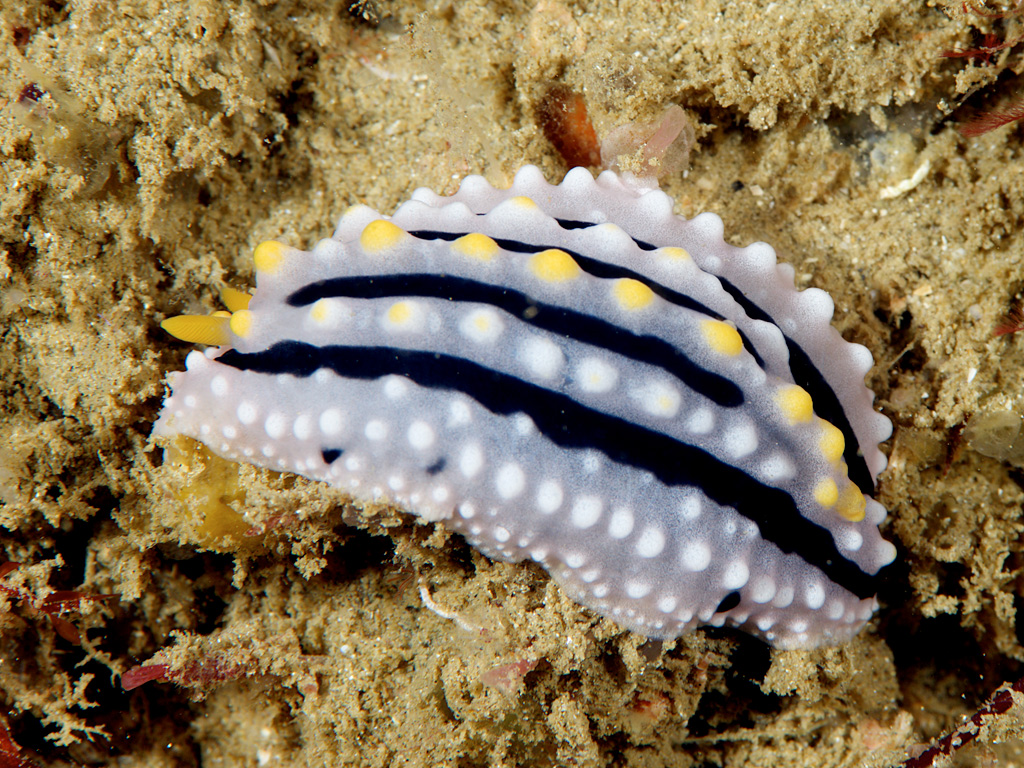
Phyllidia alyta

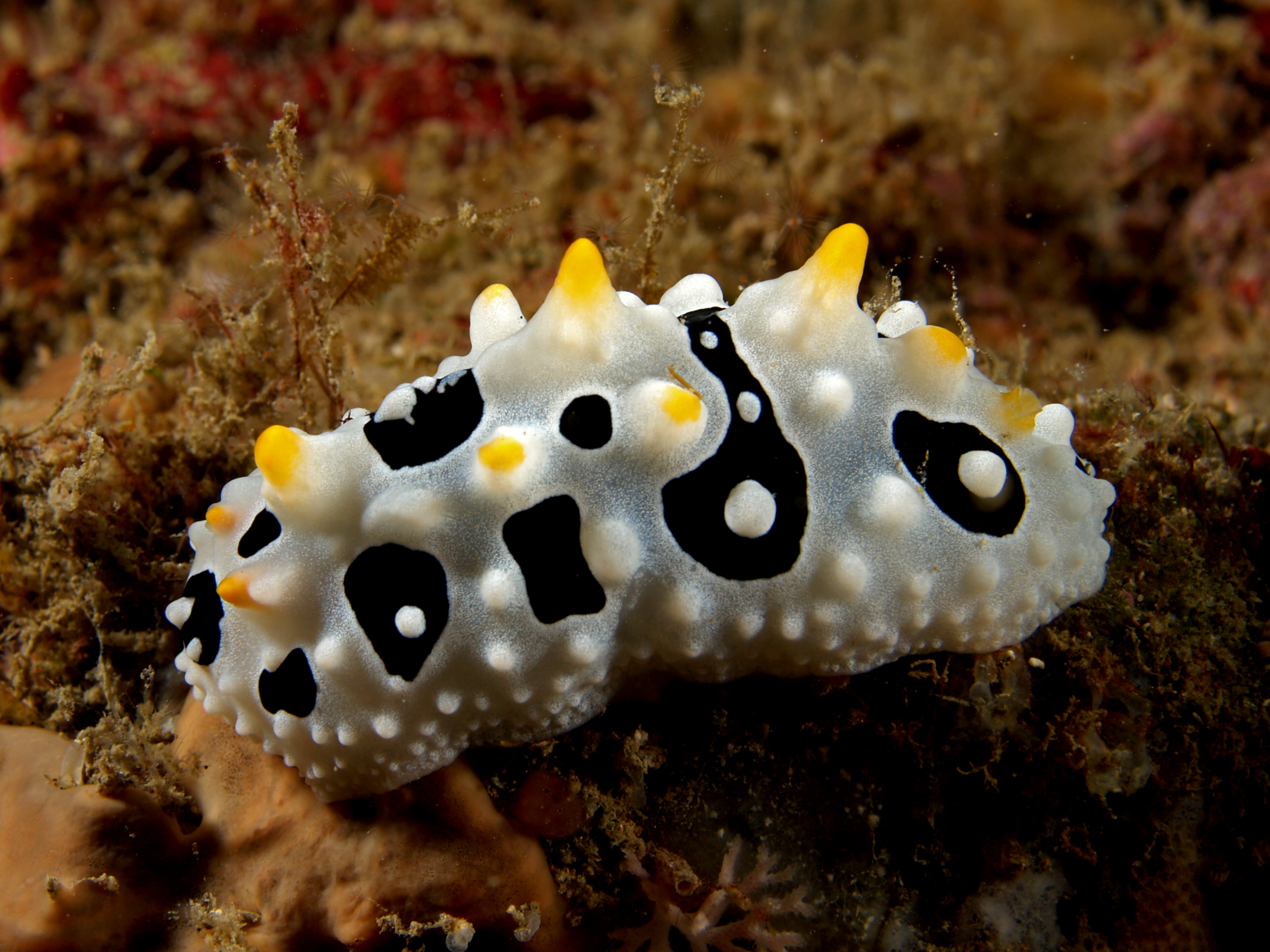
Phyllidia babai

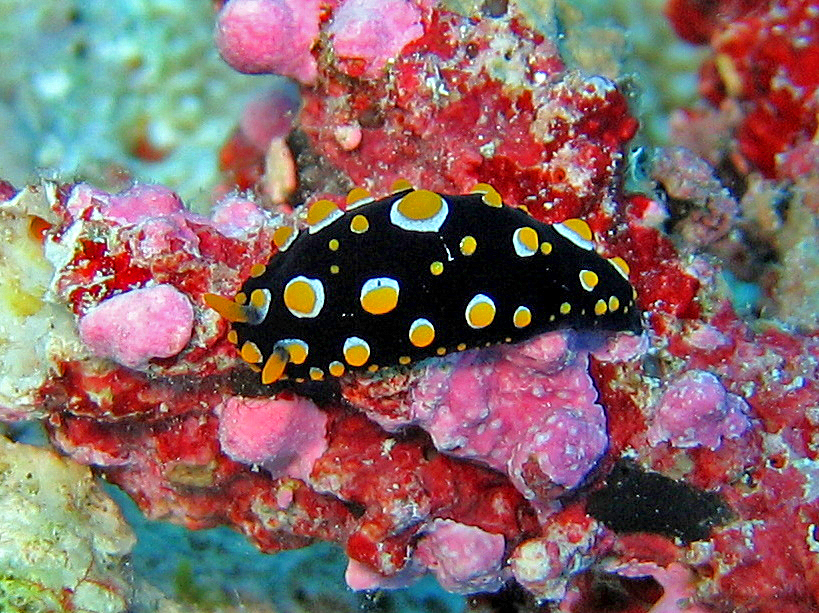
Phyllidia carlsonhoffi

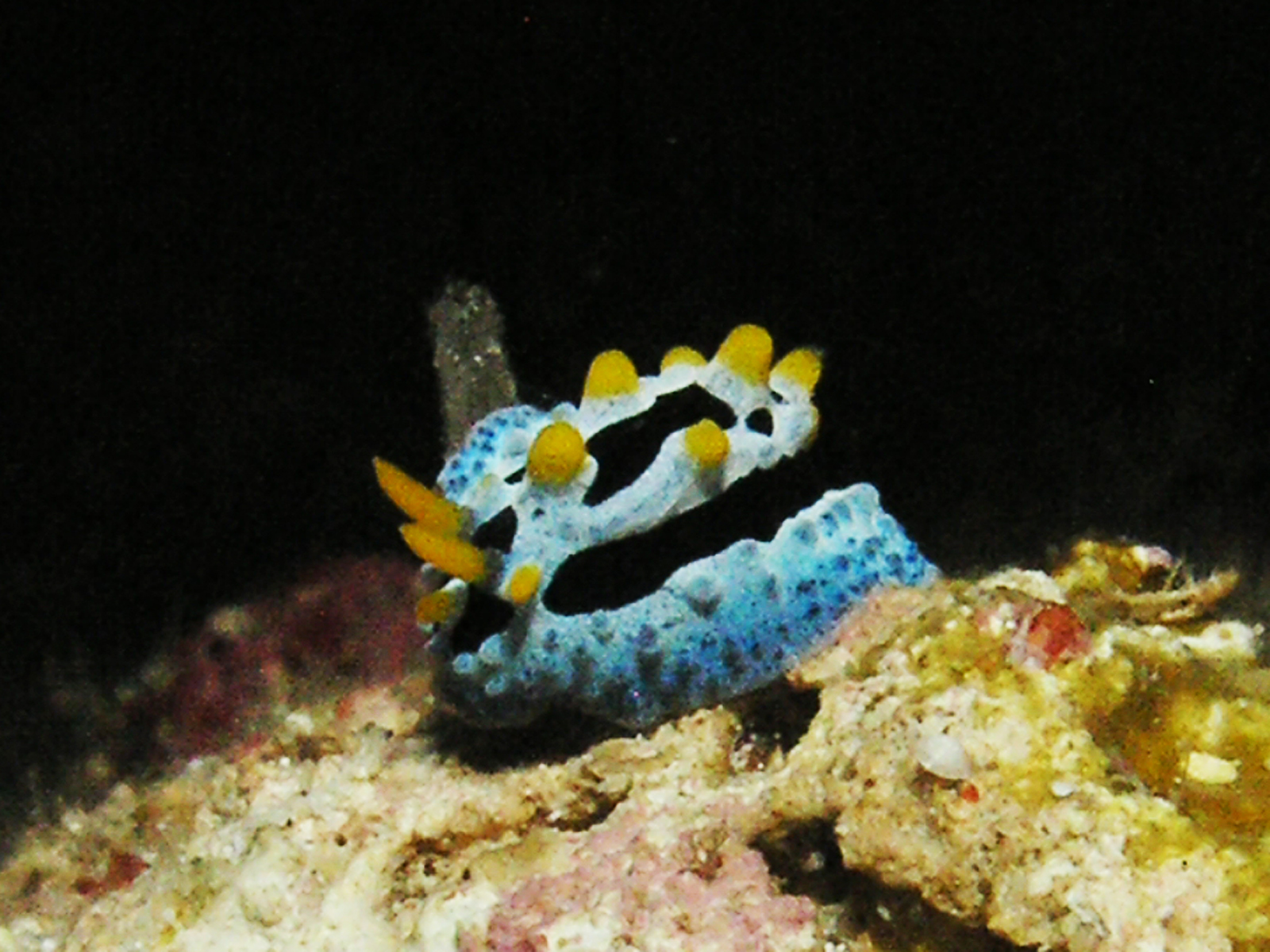
Phyllidia coelestis

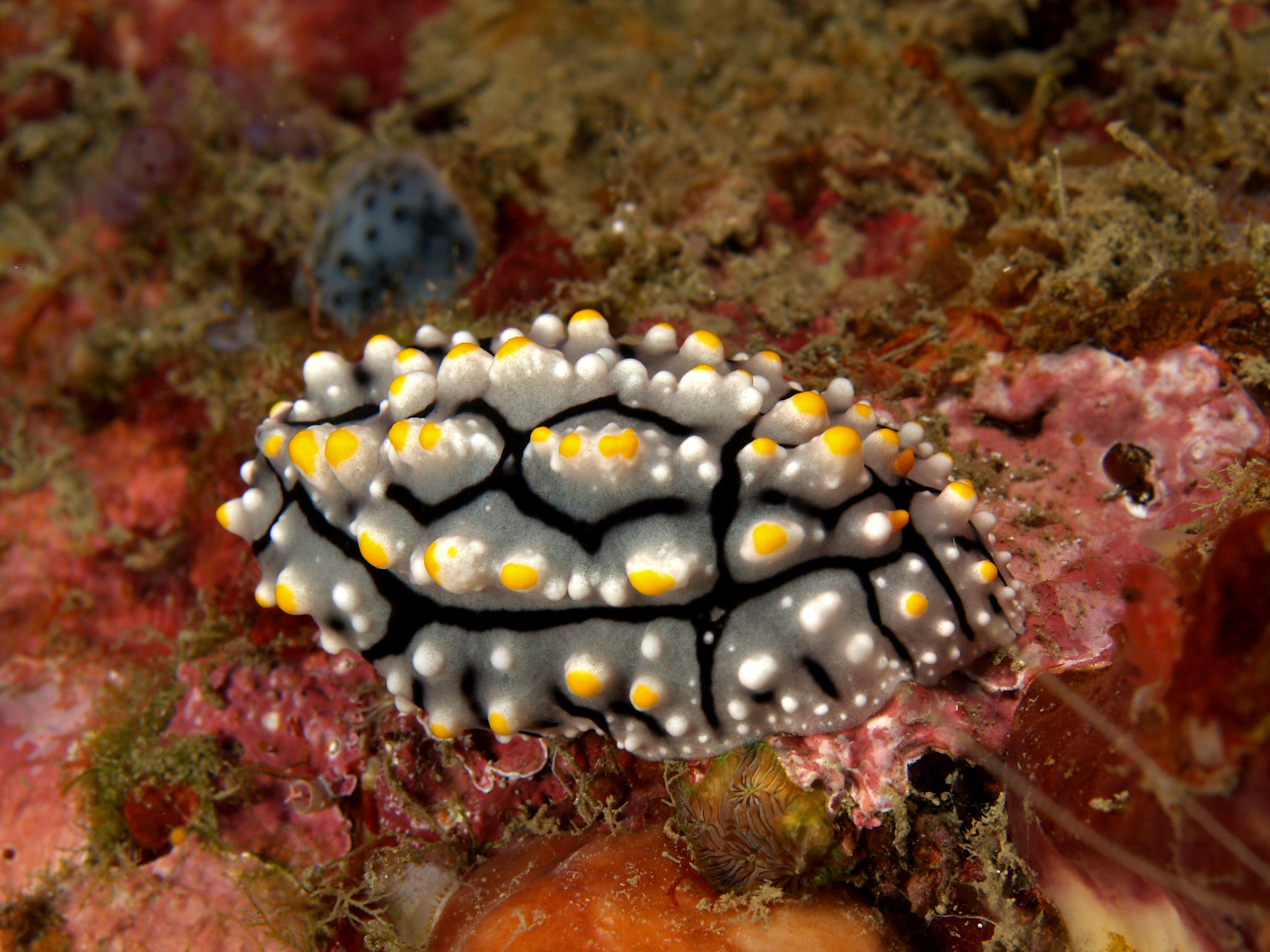
Phyllidia elegans

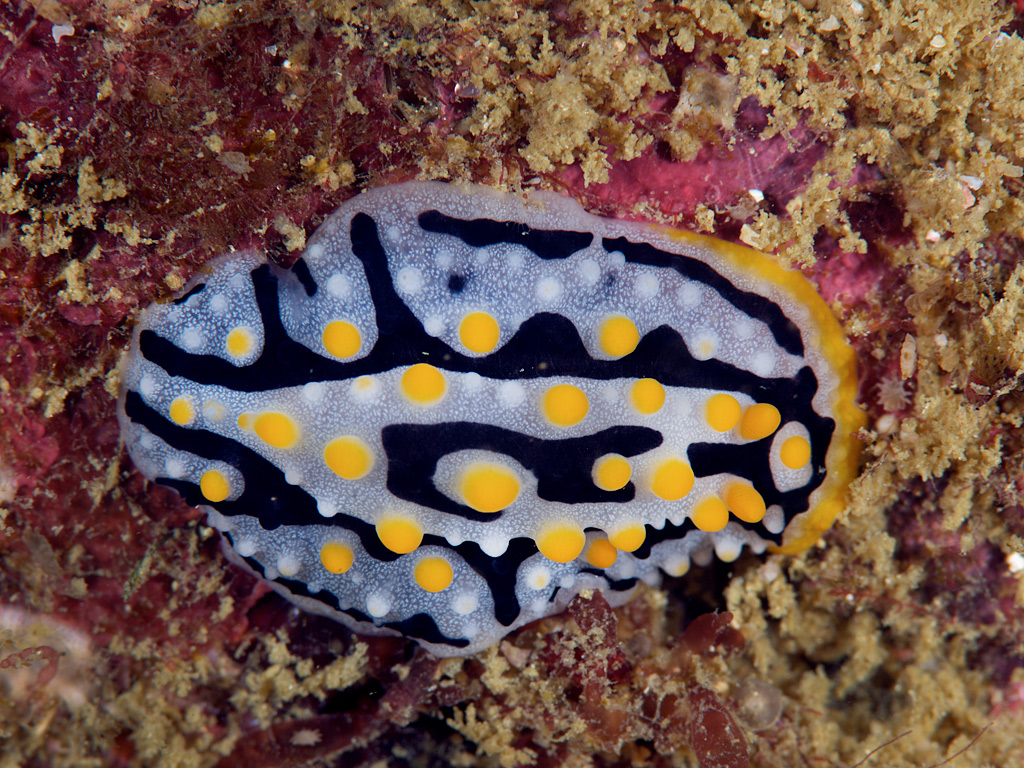
Phyllidia exquisita

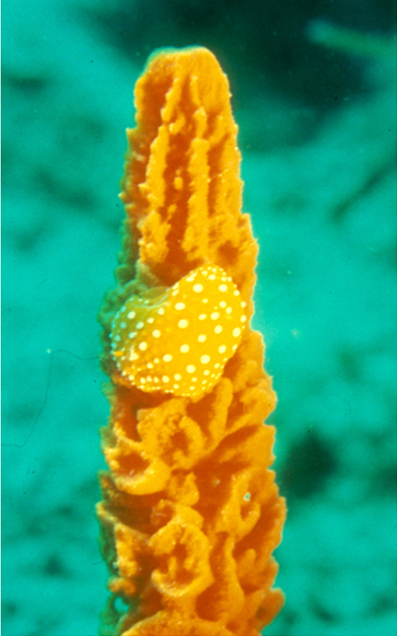
Phyllidia flava

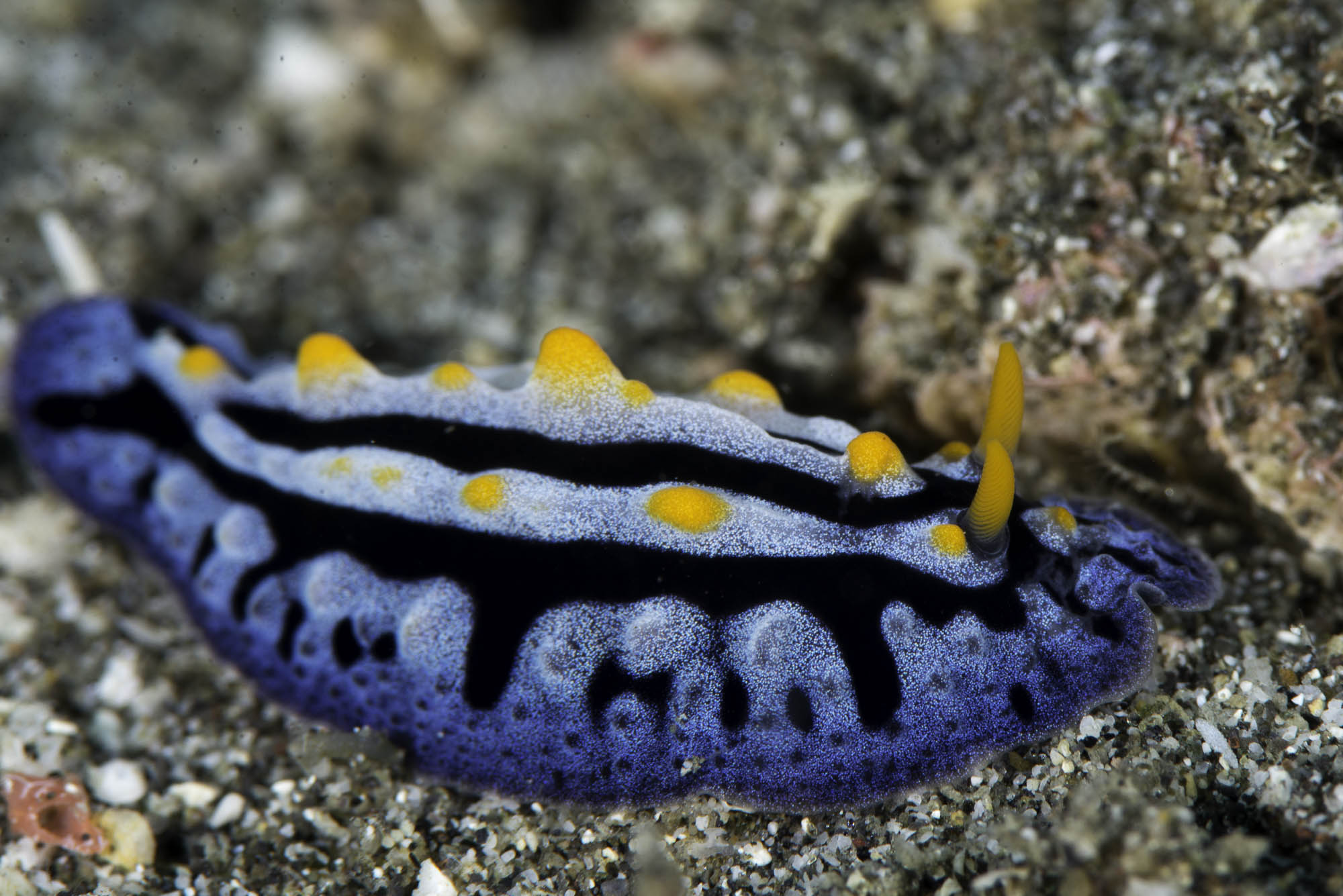
Phyllidia haegeli

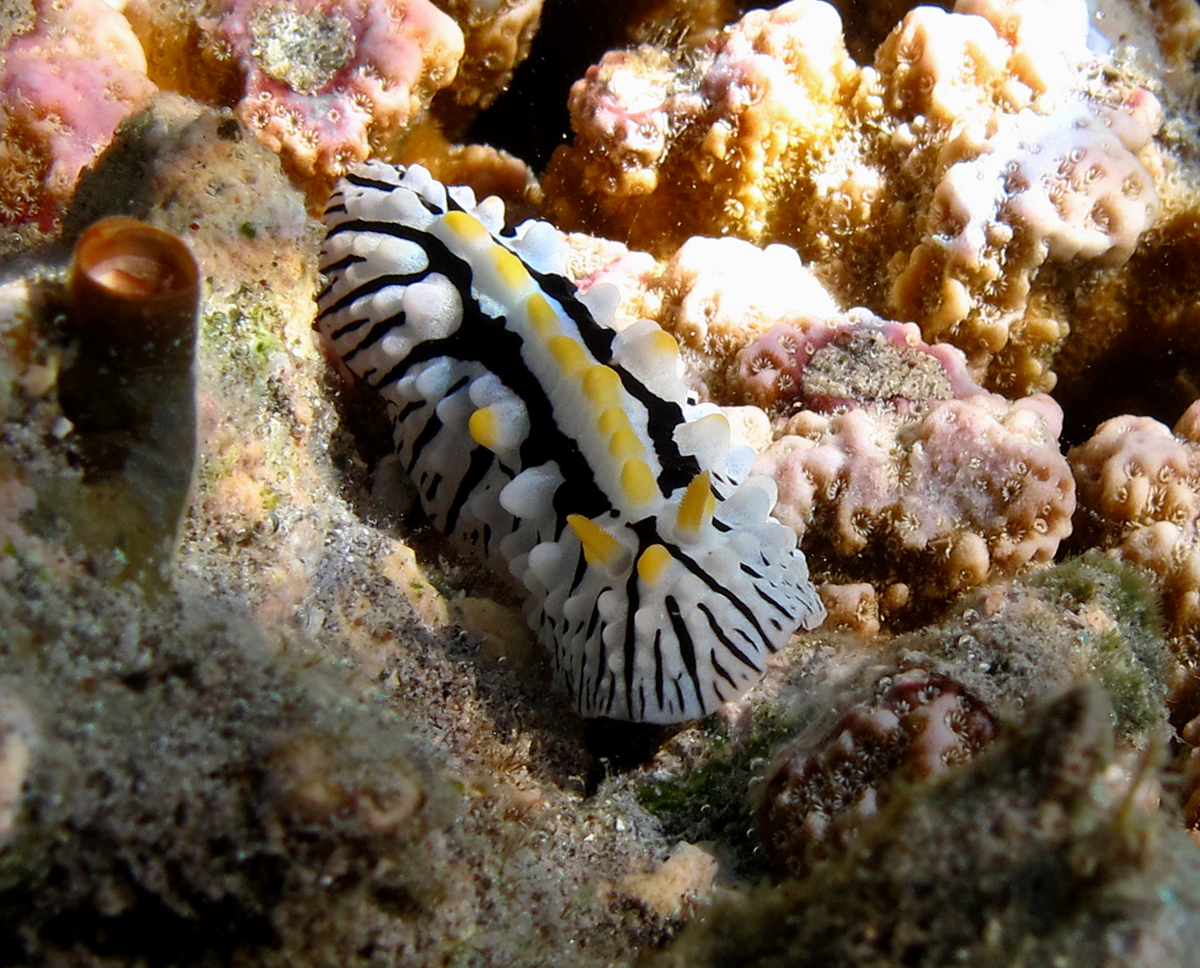
Phyllidia marindica

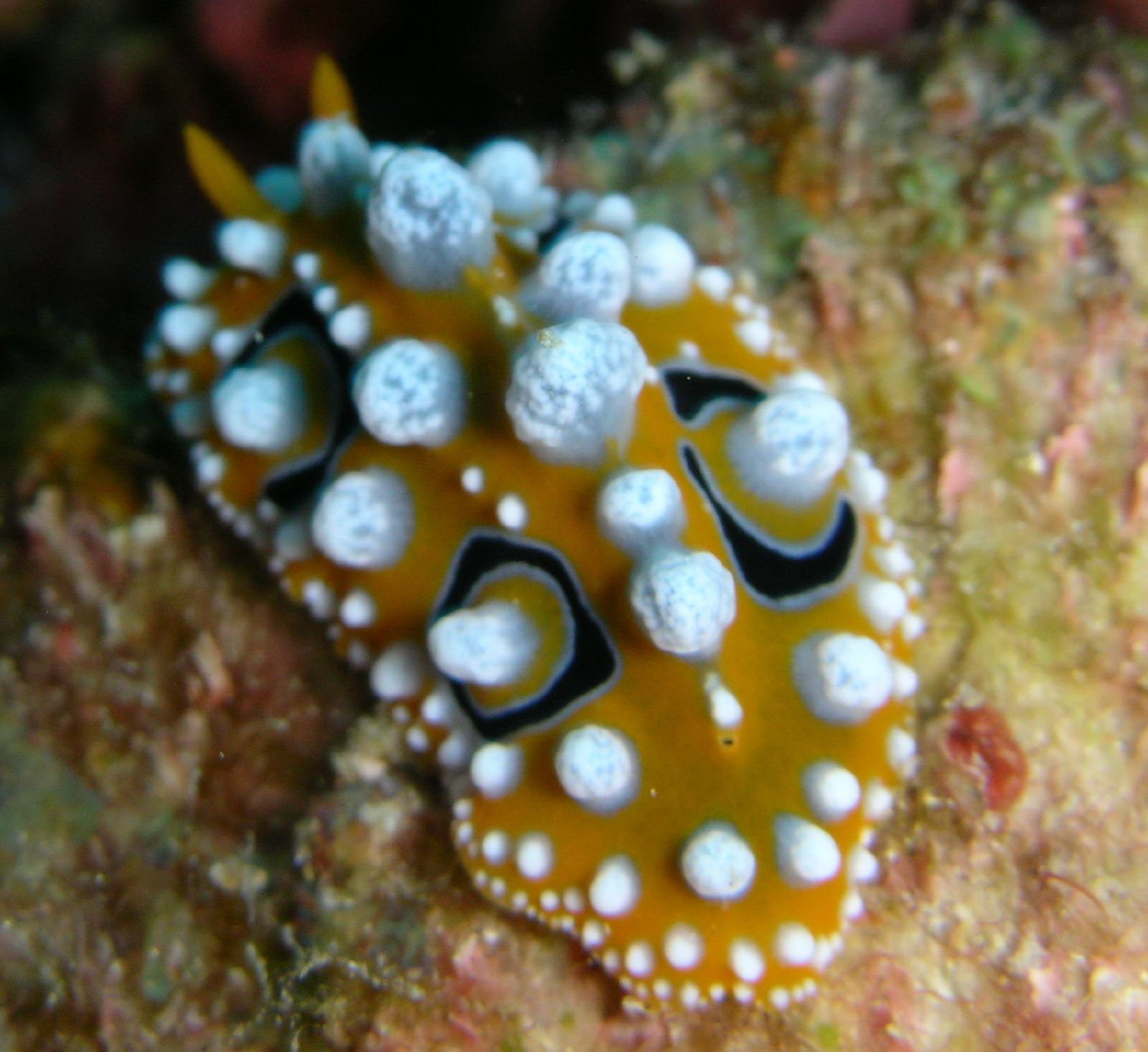
Phyllidia ocellata

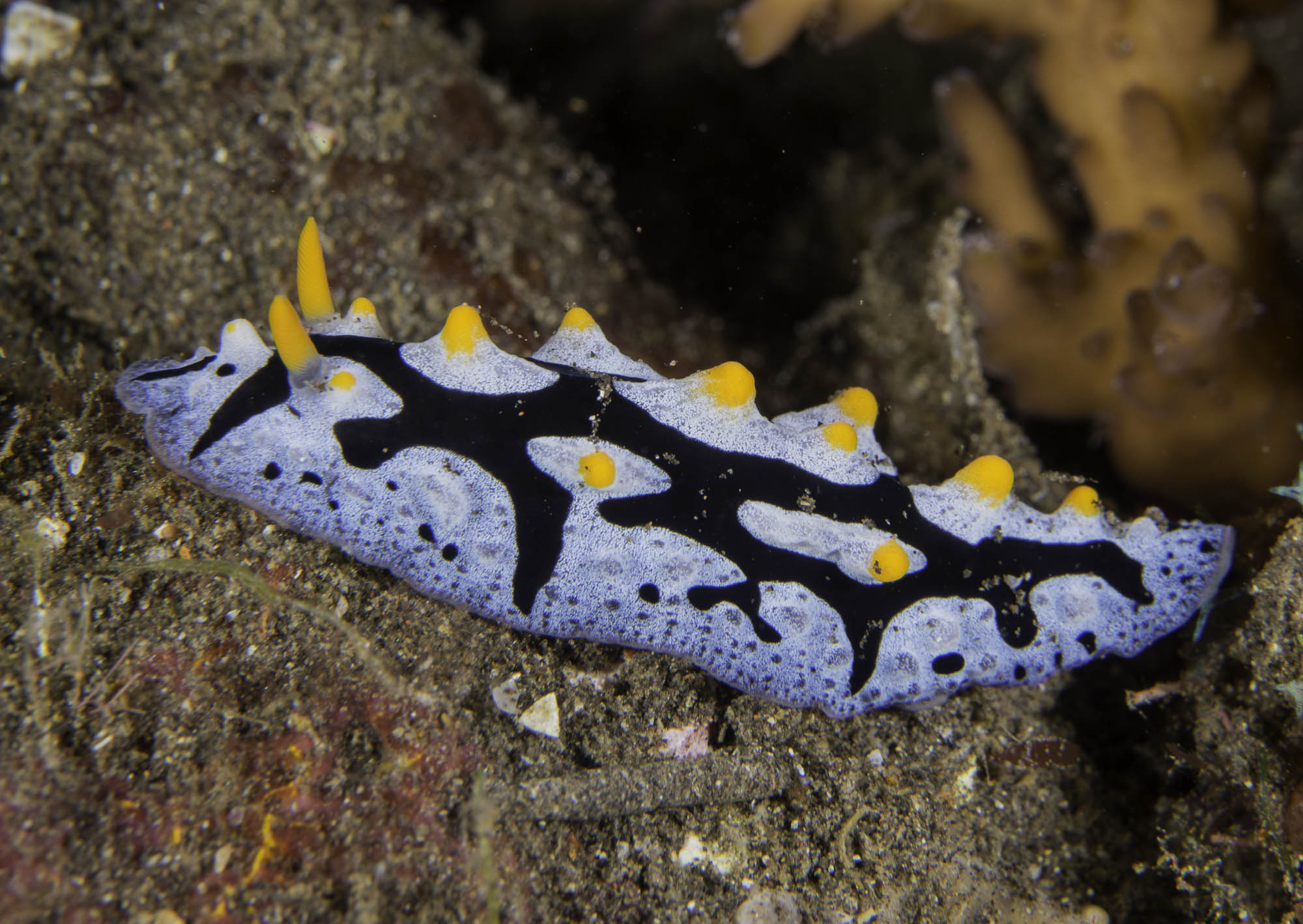
Phyllidia picta

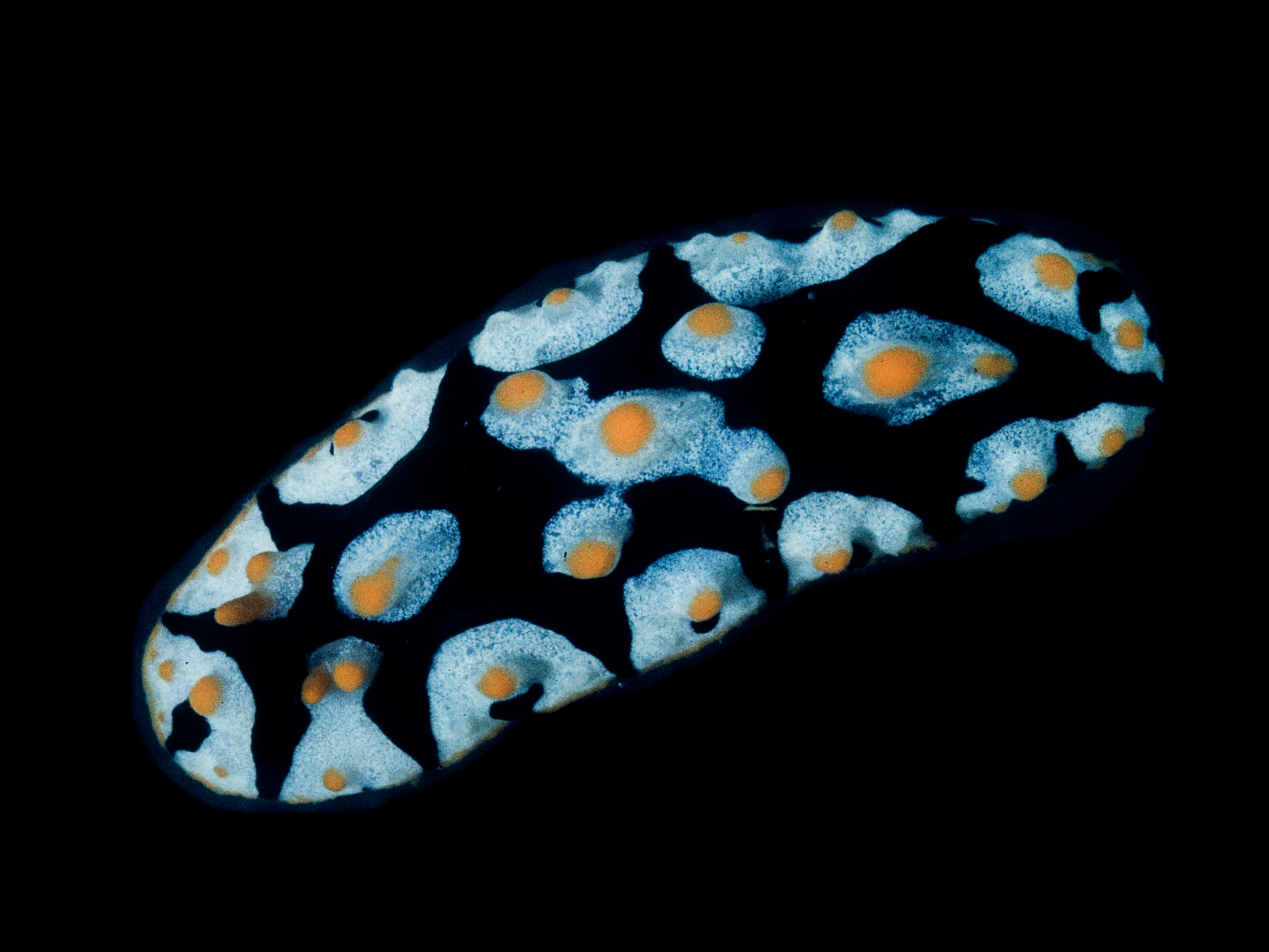
Phyllidia rueppelii

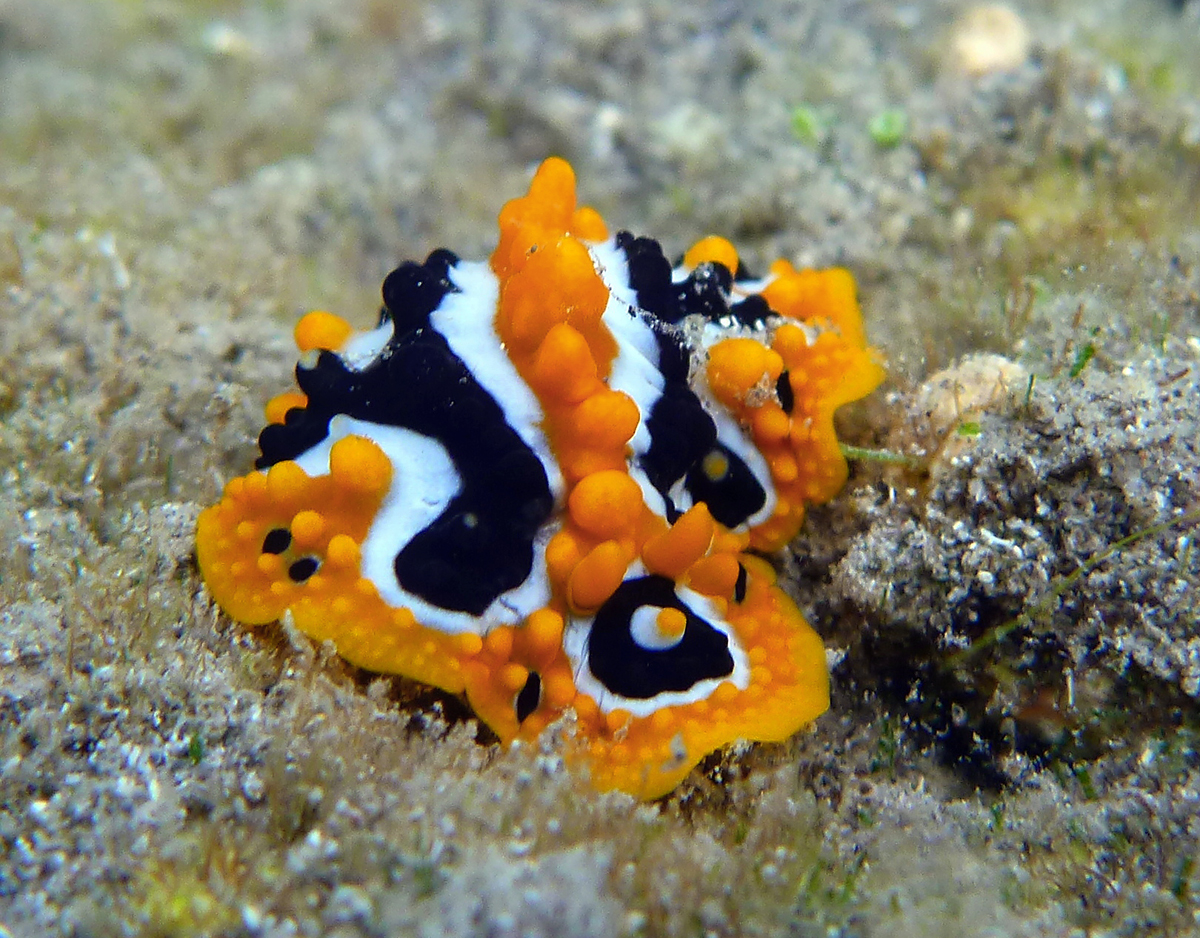
Phyllidia undula

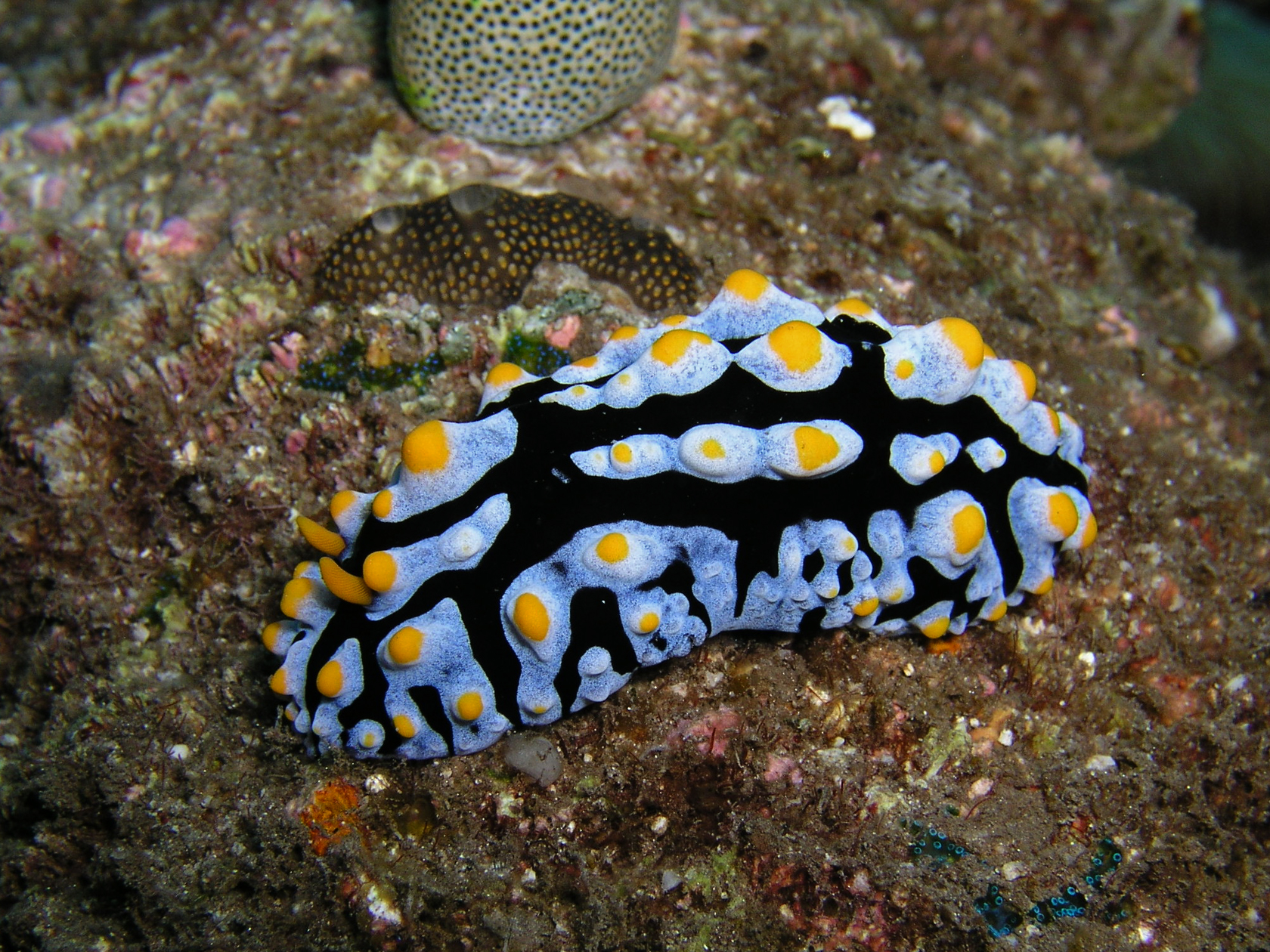
Phyllidia varicosa

Species brought into synonymy

- Phyllidia albonigra Quoy & Gaimard, 1832: synonym of Phyllidiella pustulosa (Cuvier, 1804)
- Phyllidia alia Yonow, 1984: synonym of Phyllidia coelestis Bergh, 1905
- Phyllidia annulata Gray, 1853: synonym of Phyllidiella annulata (Gray, 1853)
- Phyllidia arabica Ehrenberg, 1831: synonym of Phyllidia varicosa Lamarck, 1801
- Phyllidia aurata Pruvot-Fol, 1952: synonym of Phyllidia flava Aradas, 1847
- Phyllidia baccata Pruvot-Fol, 1957: synonym of Phyllidia ocellata Cuvier, 1804
- Phyllidia bataviae Pruvot-Fol, 1957: synonym of Phyllidiella nigra (van Hasselt, 1824)
- Phyllidia borbonica Cuvier, 1804: synonym of Phyllidia varicosa Lamarck, 1801
- Phyllidia bourgini Risbec, 1928: synonym of Phyllidiella rosans (Bergh, 1873)
- Phyllidia catena Pruvot-Fol, 1956: synonym of Phyllidiella zeylanica (Kelaart, 1859)
- Phyllidia dautzenbergi Vayssière, 1912: synonym of Phyllidiopsis dautzenbergi (Vayssière, 1912)
- Phyllidia depressa Aradas, 1847 : synonym of Phyllidia flava Aradas, 1847
- Phyllidia gemmata Pruvot-Fol, 1957: synonym of Phyllidiopsis gemmata (Pruvot-Fol, 1957)
- Phyllidia empelia Yonow, 1984: synonym of Phyllidiella striata (Bergh, 1889)
- Phyllidia fasciolata Bergh, 1869: synonym of Phyllidia varicosa Lamarck, 1801
- Phyllidia honloni Risbec, 1956: synonym of Phyllidia varicosa Lamarck, 1801
- Phyllidia japonica Baba, 1937: synonym of Phyllidia ocellata Cuvier, 1804
- Phyllidia loricata Bergh, 1873: synonym of Phyllidiopsis loricata (Bergh, 1873)
- Phyllidia meandrina Pruvot-Fol, 1957: synonym of Phyllidiella meandrina (Pruvot-Fol, 1957)
- Phyllidia mediocris Yonow & Hayward, 1991: synonym of Phyllidiella striata (Bergh, 1889)
- Phyllidia melanocera Yonow, 1986: synonym of Phyllidiella pustulosa (Cuvier, 1804)
- Phyllidia menindie (Brunckhorst, 1993): synonym of Phyllidia picta Pruvot-Fol, 1957
- Phyllidia monacha Yonow, 1986: synonym of Phyllidiopsis dautzenbergi (Vayssière, 1912)
- Phyllidia multifaria Yonow, 1986: synonym of Phyllidia elegans Bergh, 1869
- Phyllidia nigra van Hasselt, 1824: synonym of Phyllidiella nigra (van Hasselt, 1824)
- Phyllidia nigra Pease, 1868: synonym of Phyllidiella rosans (Bergh, 1873)
- Phyllidia nobilis Bergh, 1869: synonym of Phyllidiella pustulosa (Cuvier, 1804)
- Phyllidia papillosa Aradas, 1847: synonym of Phyllidia flava Aradas, 1847
- Phyllidia pulitzeri Pruvot-Fol, 1962: synonym of Phyllidia flava Aradas, 1847
- Phyllidia pustulosa Cuvier, 1804 : synonym of Phyllidiella pustulosa (Cuvier, 1804)
- Phyllidia quinquelineata Blainville, 1816: synonym of Phyllidia varicosa Lamarck, 1801
- Phyllidia rolandiae Pruvot-Fol, 1951: synonym of Phyllidia flava Aradas, 1847
- Phyllidia rosans Bergh, 1873: synonym of Phyllidiella rosans (Bergh, 1873)
- Phyllidia rotunda Eliot, 1904: synonym of Phyllidiella pustulosa (Cuvier, 1804)
- Phyllidia schupporum Fahrner & Schrödl, 2000 : synonym of Phyllidia elegans Bergh, 1869
- Phyllidia serenei Risbec, 1956: synonym of Phyllidiella nigra (van Hasselt, 1824)
- Phyllidia sereni [sic]: synonym of Phyllidiella nigra (van Hasselt, 1824)
- Phyllidia seriata Pruvot-Fol, 1957: synonym of Phyllidiella zeylanica (Kelaart, 1859)
- Phyllidia sinaiensis Yonow, 1988: synonym of Phyllidiopsis sinaiensis (Yonow, 1988)
- Phyllidia soria Er. Marcus & Ev. Marcus, 1970: synonym of Phyllidiella rosans (Bergh, 1873)
- Phyllidia spectabilis Collingwood, 1881: synonym of Phyllidiella pustulosa (Cuvier, 1804)
- Phyllidia sudanensis Heller & Thompson, 1983: synonym of Phyllidiella annulata (Gray, 1853)
- Phyllidia trilineata Cuvier, 1804: synonym of Phyllidia varicosa Lamarck, 1801
- Phyllidia tuberculata Baba, 1930: synonym of Phyllidia ocellata Cuvier, 1804
- Phyllidia tuberculata Risbec, 1928: synonym of Phyllidiopsis cardinalis Bergh, 1876
- Phyllidia verrucosa van Hasselt, 1824: synonym of Phyllidiella pustulosa (Cuvier, 1804)
- Phyllidia xishaensis Lin, 1983: synonym of Phyllidiopsis xishaensis (Lin, 1983)
- Phyllidia zeylanica Kelaart, 1859: synonym of Phyllidiella zeylanica (Kelaart, 1859)
