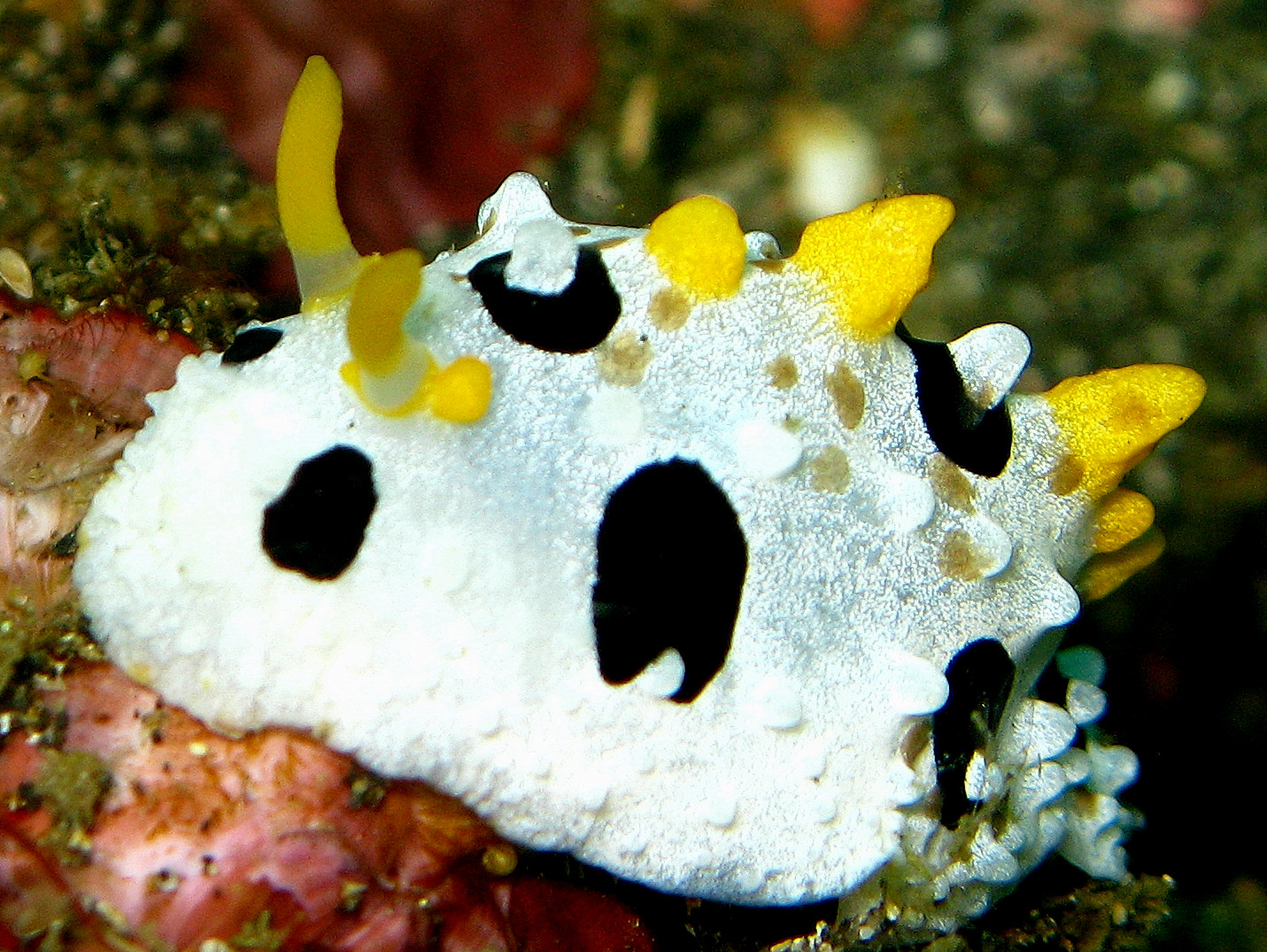

Scientific classification
- Kingdom: Animalia
- Phylum: Mollusca
- Class: Gastropoda
- Order: Nudibranchia
- Family: Phyllidiidae
- Genus: Phyllidia
- Species: P. tula

Binomial name
- Phyllidia tula Er. Marcus & Ev. Marcus, 1970

= Phyllidia tula =

Species of gastropod

Phyllidia tula is a species of sea slug, a dorid nudibranch, a shell-less marine gastropod mollusk in the family Phyllidiidae.

== Distribution ==
This species was described from the Ellice Islands, now known as Tuvalu. Brunckhorst examined the type material kept at the US National Museum and additional material from Guam and redescribed the species in greater detail. It has also been reported from the Marshall Islands.

== Description ==
This nudibranch has a black dorsum with large yellow-capped tubercles surrounded by pale blue or translucent white rings. Towards the edge of the mantle these tubercles become small and scattered, sometimes without any yellow caps. The rhinophores are yellow or orange. A distinctive feature is the presence of small, yellow-capped, tubercles at the edges of some of the large tubercles in the middle of the back, and scattered smaller tubercles between the larger ones. The underside of the foot is grey with a longitudinal black line. It is very similar to Phyllidia carlsonhoffi and Phyllidia madangensis.

== Diet ==
This species feeds on a sponge.
