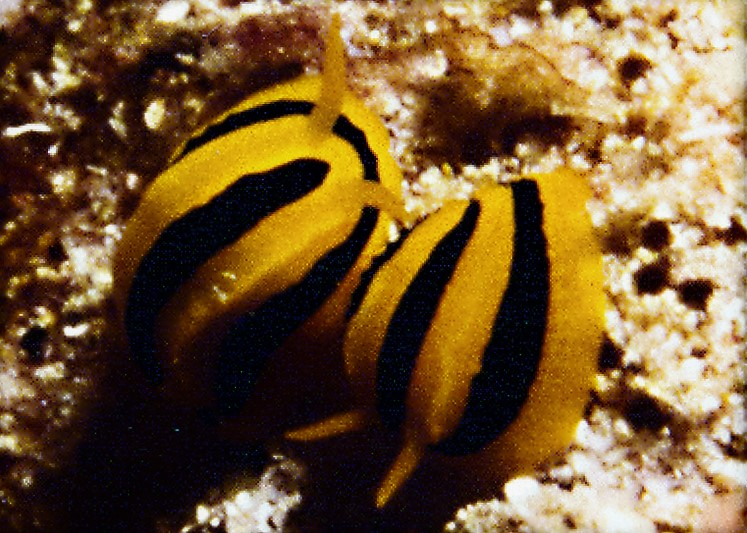
- A pair of mating Phyllidia koehleri, Maldives.

Scientific classification
- Domain: Eukaryota
- Kingdom: Animalia
- Phylum: Mollusca
- Class: Gastropoda
- Order: Nudibranchia
- Superfamily: Phyllidioidea
- Family: Phyllidiidae
- Genus: Phyllidia
- Species: P. koehleri

Binomial name
- Phyllidia koehleri Perrone, 2000

= Phyllidia koehleri =

Species of gastropod

Phyllidia koehleri is a species of sea slug, a dorid nudibranch, a shell-less marine gastropod mollusk in the family Phyllidiidae.

== Distribution ==
This species was described from the Maldives.

== Description ==
This nudibranch has an orange coloured dorsum with three longitudinal black lines. The outer lines continue across the front of the head and around the back of the mantle, forming a complete ring. There are longitudinal ridges along the back and the rhinophores are orange-yellow. There are also animals with the same coloration but a pattern of radiating black lines on the outer part of the mantle and conspicuous tubercles. This is probably a different species.

== Diet ==
This species feeds on a red sponge.
