= Phyllidia larryi =

Scientific classification
- Kingdom: Animalia
- Phylum: Mollusca
- Class: Gastropoda
- Order: Nudibranchia
- Family: Phyllidiidae
- Genus: Phyllidia
- Species: P. larryi

Binomial name
- Phyllidia larryi (Brunckhorst, 1993)

Synonyms
- Fryeria larryi Brunckhorst, 1993

Species of gastropod

Phyllidia larryi is a species of sea slug, a dorid nudibranch, a shell-less marine gastropod mollusk in the family Phyllidiidae.

== Distribution ==
This rare species was described from Guam. It has been reported from Japan but there is confusion with Phyllidia zebrina. A similar species is reported from the Hawaiian Islands.

== Description ==
This nudibranch has a yellow dorsum with numerous small tubercles. There are a small number of narrow red or orange lines running from the mantle margin towards the middle of the dorsum.

== Diet ==
This species feeds on a sponge.
