= Phyllidia scottjohnsoni =

Scientific classification
- Kingdom: Animalia
- Phylum: Mollusca
- Class: Gastropoda
- Order: Nudibranchia
- Family: Phyllidiidae
- Genus: Phyllidia
- Species: P. scottjohnsoni

Binomial name
- Phyllidia scottjohnsoni Brunckhorst, 1993

Species of gastropod

Phyllidia scottjohnsoni is a species of sea slug, a dorid nudibranch, a shell-less marine gastropod mollusk in the family Phyllidiidae.

== Distribution ==
This species was described from the Hawaiian Islands.

== Description ==
This nudibranch has a partly translucent, white dorsum with large round black spots. There are small, scattered, tubercles all over the back.

== Diet ==
This species feeds on a sponge.
