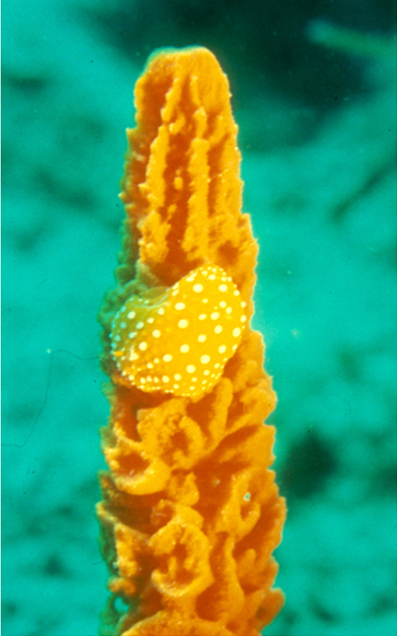
- A live individual of Phyllidia flava on a yellow sponge, head end towards the left

Scientific classification
- Domain: Eukaryota
- Kingdom: Animalia
- Phylum: Mollusca
- Class: Gastropoda
- Order: Nudibranchia
- Superfamily: Phyllidioidea
- Family: Phyllidiidae
- Genus: Phyllidia
- Species: P. flava

Binomial name
- Phyllidia flava Aradas, 1847

= Phyllidia flava =

Species of gastropod

Phyllidia flava is a species of sea slug, a dorid nudibranch, a marine gastropod mollusk in the family Phyllidiidae.

== Distribution ==
This species is the only Phyllidiid known to be native to the Mediterranean Sea.
