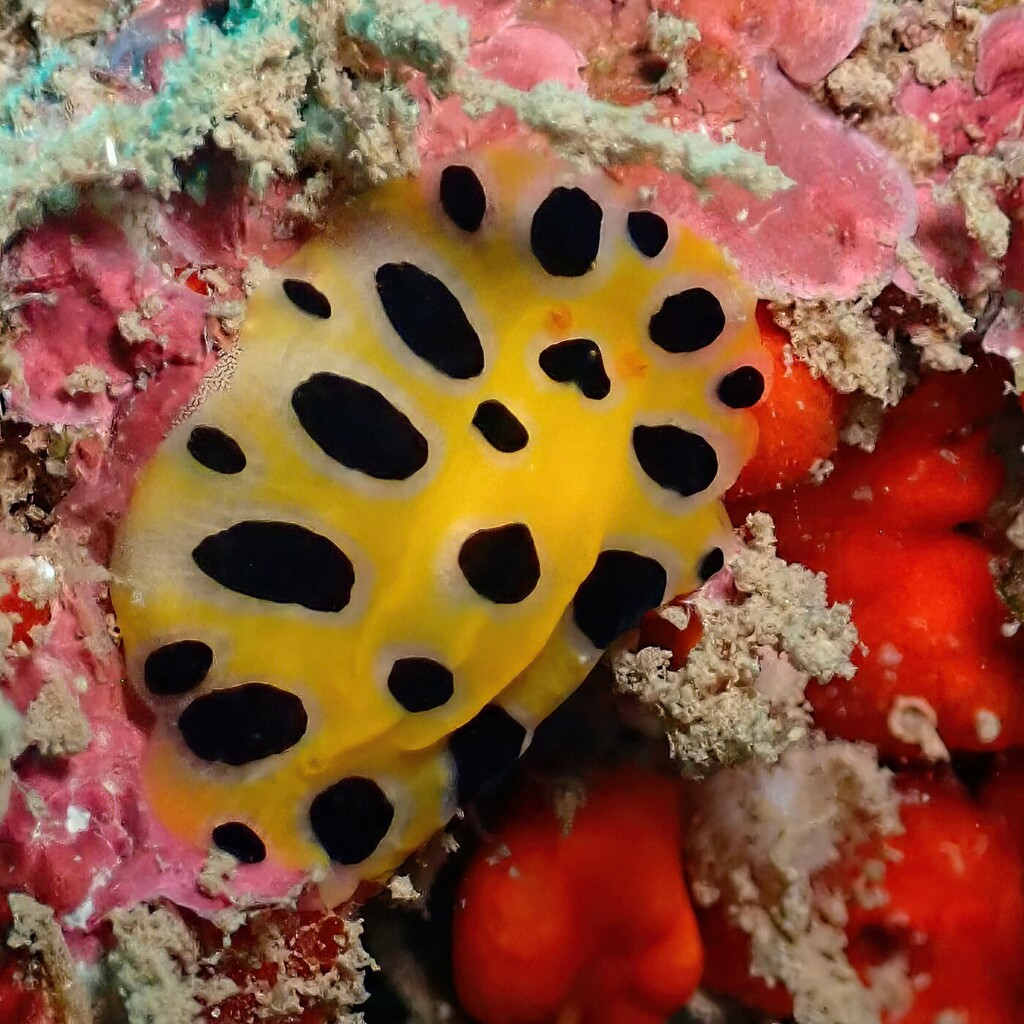
- .

Scientific classification
- Kingdom: Animalia
- Phylum: Mollusca
- Class: Gastropoda
- Order: Nudibranchia
- Family: Phyllidiidae
- Genus: Phyllidia
- Species: P. polkadotsa

Binomial name
- Phyllidia polkadotsa Brunckhorst, 1993

= Phyllidia polkadotsa =

Species of gastropod

Phyllidia polkadotsa is a species of sea slug, a dorid nudibranch, a shell-less marine gastropod mollusk in the family Phyllidiidae.

== Distribution ==
This species was described from the Hawaiian Islands.

== Description ==
This nudibranch has a yellow or orange coloured dorsum with large round black spots which are surrounded by a paler, translucent, ring. There are three longitudinal ridges along the back and small, scattered, tubercles.

== Diet ==
This species feeds on a sponge.
