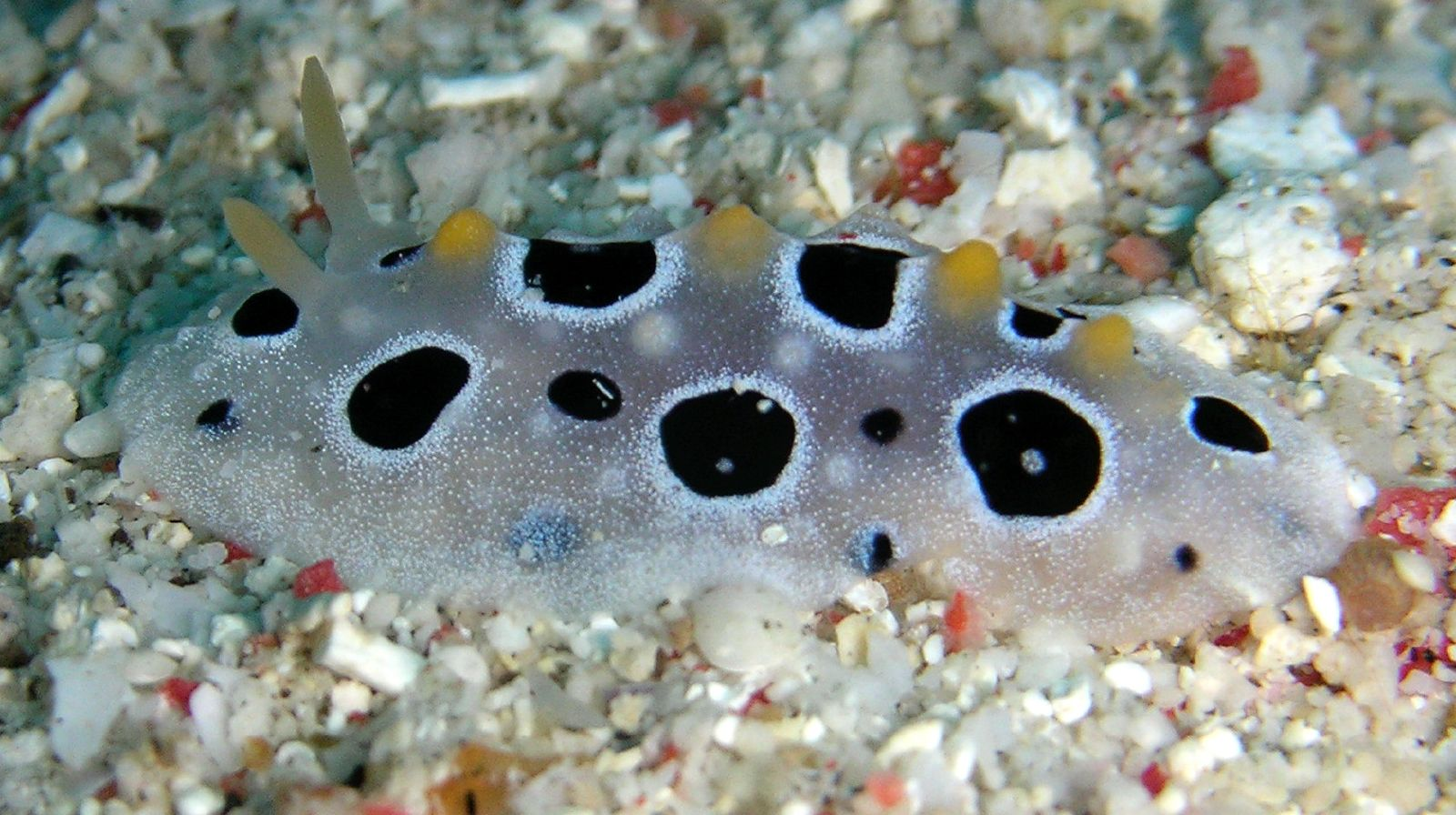
- A live individual of Phyllidia babai, head end towards the left

Scientific classification
- Kingdom: Animalia
- Phylum: Mollusca
- Class: Gastropoda
- Order: Nudibranchia
- Family: Phyllidiidae
- Genus: Phyllidia
- Species: P. babai

Binomial name
- Phyllidia babai Brunckhorst, 1993

= Phyllidia babai =

Species of gastropod

Phyllidia babai is a species of sea slug, a dorid nudibranch, a shell-less marine gastropod mollusk in the family Phyllidiidae.

The specific name babai is in honor of Kikutaro Baba, Japanese malacologist.

== Distribution ==
The holotype of this species was collected at Lion Island, Papua New Guinea, 9.536°S 147.272°E. It has also been reported from North Sulawesi, Lembeh Strait, southern Queensland, Australia, South Korea and rarely on Okinawa. A number of similar coloured species have been found but are probably not yet named.

== Description ==
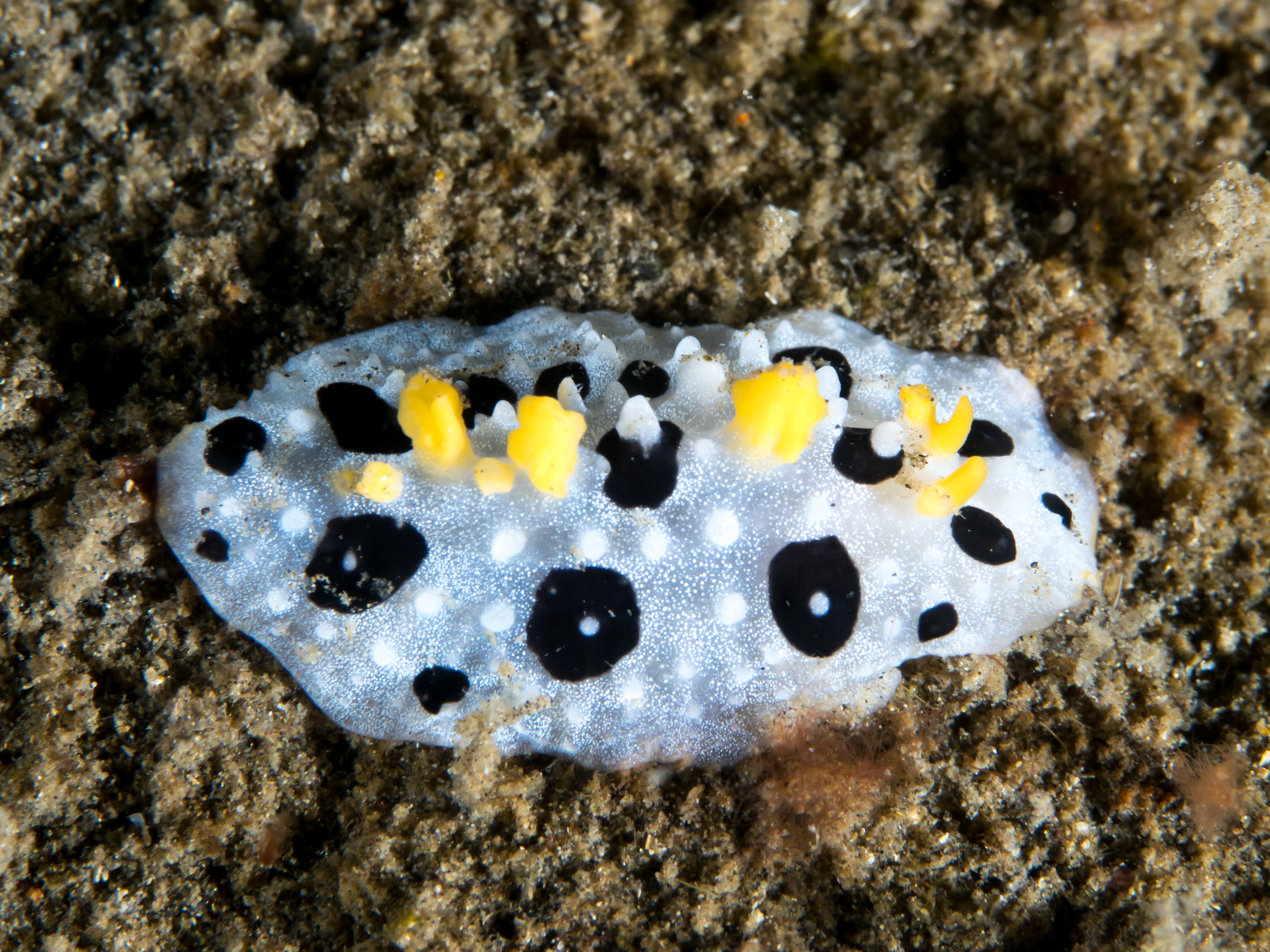
Phyllidia babai in Lembeh, Indonesia

This nudibranch has a cream to light yellow coloured dorsum with white tubercles in the center of black rings and the mantle finely edged in yellow. The clavus of each rhinophore has 21 to 24 lamellae, and the rhinophoral pocket is trimmed in white. Its white-coloured, pointed, oral tentacles have lateral grooves, and they also are trimmed in yellow. The ventral surface is a pale cream colour.

== Diet ==
This species has been observed feeding on the yellow sponge Acanthella stipata.
