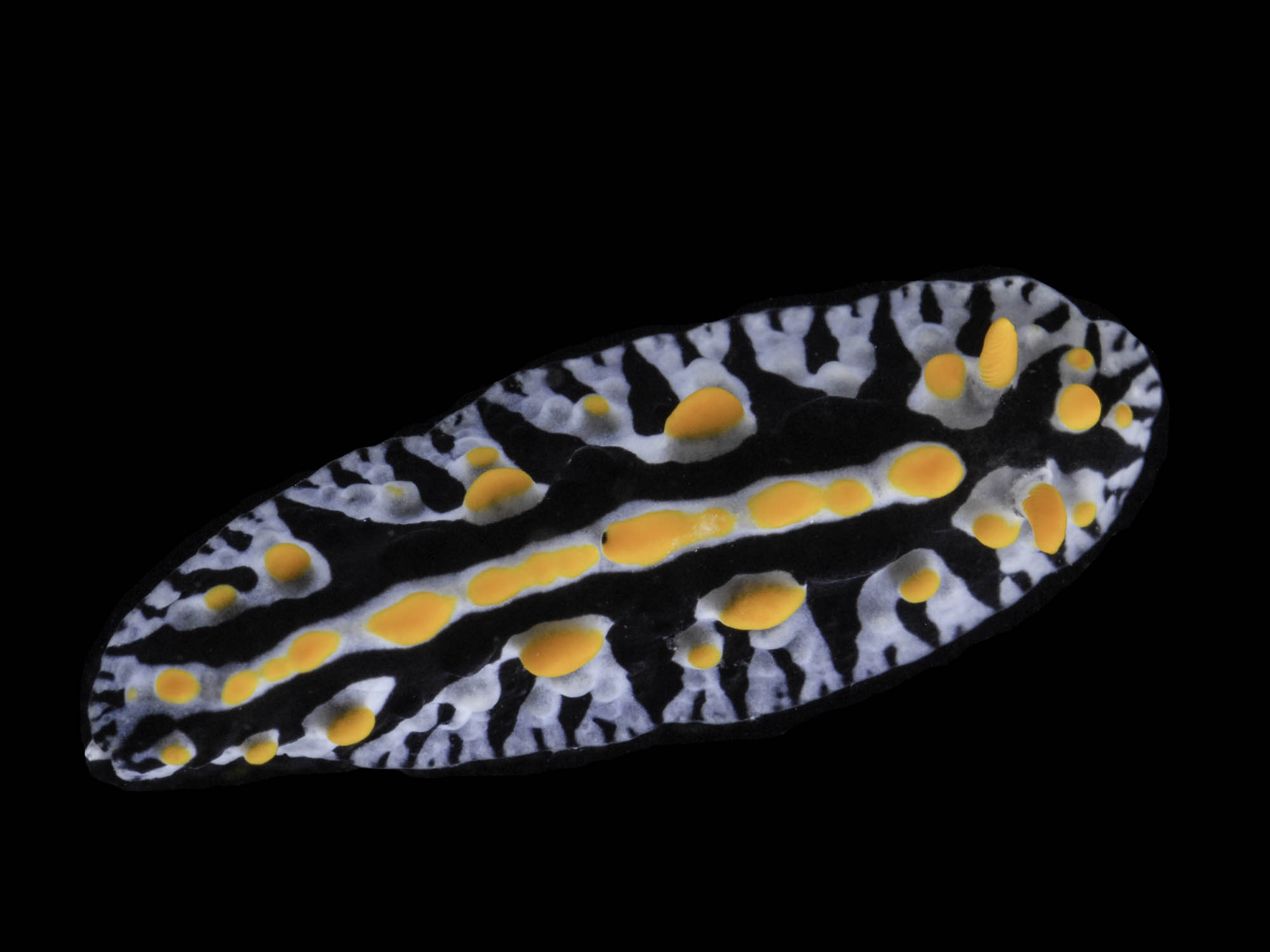
- The nudibranch Phyllidia marindica, Diani Beach, Kenya.

Scientific classification
- Kingdom: Animalia
- Phylum: Mollusca
- Class: Gastropoda
- Order: Nudibranchia
- Family: Phyllidiidae
- Genus: Phyllidia
- Species: P. marindica

Binomial name
- Phyllidia marindica (Yonow & Hayward, 1991)

Synonyms
- Reyfria marindica Yonow & Hayward, 1991; Fryeria marindica (Yonow & Hayward, 1991)

= Phyllidia marindica =

Species of gastropod

Phyllidia marindica is a species of sea slug, a dorid nudibranch, a shell-less marine gastropod mollusk in the family Phyllidiidae.

== Distribution ==
This common species was described from Mauritius. It has been reported from the South Africa to Thailand and north-west Australia.

== Description ==
This nudibranch has a pattern of black on the dorsum interrupted by large yellow-capped tubercles surrounded by pale blue rings which join between the tubercles along the midline. The blue areas coalesce towards the edge of the mantle and the tubercles become small and increasingly numerous, without any yellow caps. The rhinophores are yellow.

== Diet ==
This species feeds on a sponge.
