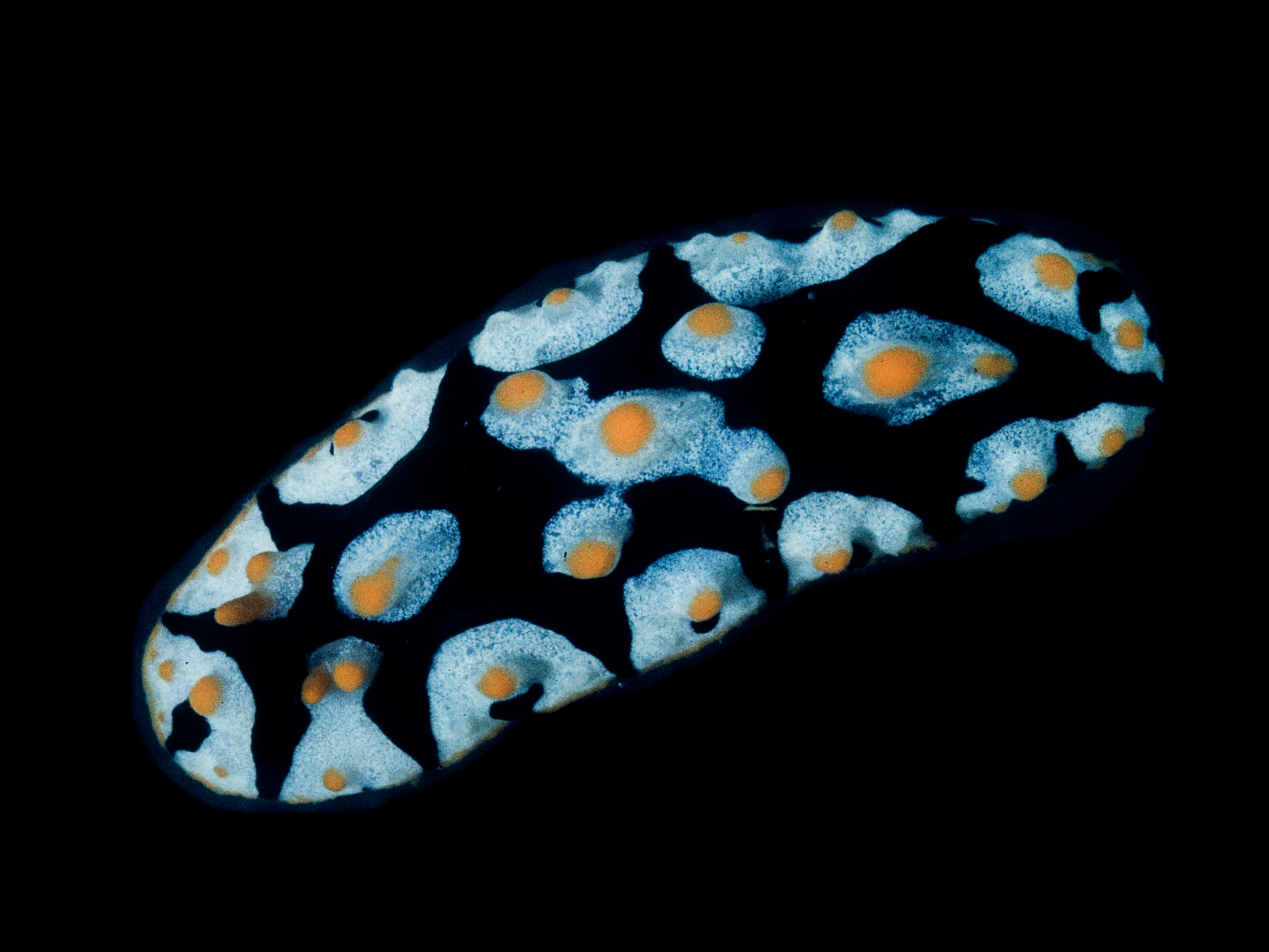
- The nudibranch Phyllidia rueppelii, Sharm el Sheikh, Red Sea, Egypt

Scientific classification
- Kingdom: Animalia
- Phylum: Mollusca
- Class: Gastropoda
- Order: Nudibranchia
- Family: Phyllidiidae
- Genus: Phyllidia
- Species: P. rueppelii

Binomial name
- Phyllidia rueppelii (Bergh, 1869)

= Phyllidia rueppelii =

Species of gastropod

Phyllidia rueppelii is a species of sea slug, a dorid nudibranch, a shell-less marine gastropod mollusk in the family Phyllidiidae.

== Distribution ==
This species was described from the Red Sea. It has been reported from the Gulf of Oman.
