= Phyllidia zebrina =

Scientific classification
- Kingdom: Animalia
- Phylum: Mollusca
- Class: Gastropoda
- Order: Nudibranchia
- Family: Phyllidiidae
- Genus: Phyllidia
- Species: P. zebrina

Binomial name
- Phyllidia zebrina Baba, 1976

Species of gastropod

Phyllidia zebrina is a species of sea slug, a dorid nudibranch, a shell-less marine gastropod mollusk in the family Phyllidiidae.

== Distribution ==
The holotype of this species was collected at Amadaiba, Sagami Bay, Japan.

== Description ==
This nudibranch has a translucent mantle heavily spotted with opaque white or yellow. There are a series of black (or dark red) lines radiating in from near the mantle edge towards the middle of the body. There is confusion with Phyllidia larryi.

== Diet ==
This species feeds on a sponge.
