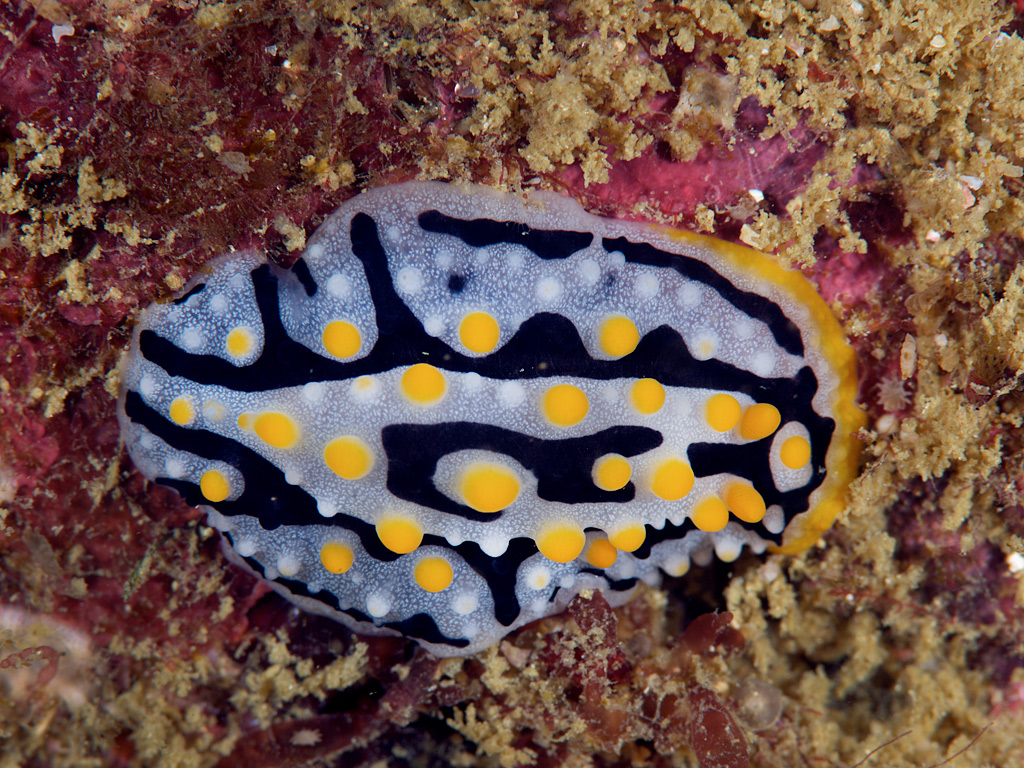
- The nudibranch Phyllidia exquisita, head end towards the right, Mirissa, Sri Lanka.

Scientific classification
- Kingdom: Animalia
- Phylum: Mollusca
- Class: Gastropoda
- Order: Nudibranchia
- Family: Phyllidiidae
- Genus: Phyllidia
- Species: P. exquisita

Binomial name
- Phyllidia exquisita Brunckhorst, 1993

= Phyllidia exquisita =

Species of gastropod

Phyllidia exquisita is a species of sea slug, a dorid nudibranch, a shell-less marine gastropod mollusk in the family Phyllidiidae.

== Distribution ==
This species was described from Lion Island, Papua New Guinea. It has also been found in the Maldives, Sri Lanka and Indonesia.

== Description ==
This nudibranch has a grey coloured dorsum with smaller white and larger yellow tubercles in irregular rows separated by black lines. The rhinophores are yellow and there is a yellow-orange margin at the edge of the mantle across the front of the head and the first quarter of the sides of the body.

== Diet ==
This species feeds on a sponge.
