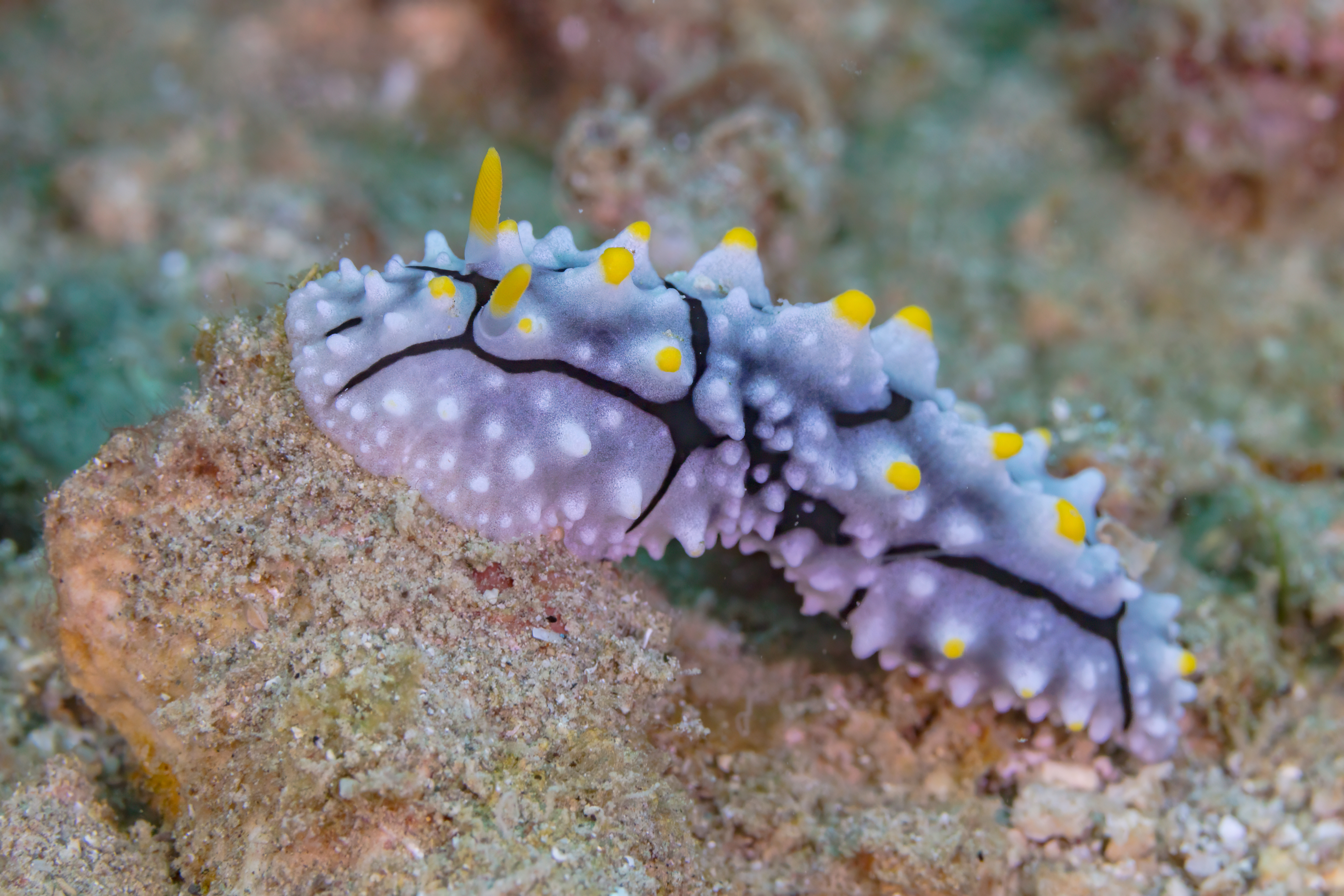
- A live individual of Phyllidia elegans, head end towards the right

Scientific classification
- Kingdom: Animalia
- Phylum: Mollusca
- Class: Gastropoda
- Order: Nudibranchia
- Family: Phyllidiidae
- Genus: Phyllidia
- Species: P. elegans

Binomial name
- Phyllidia elegans Bergh, 1869

= Phyllidia elegans =

Species of gastropod

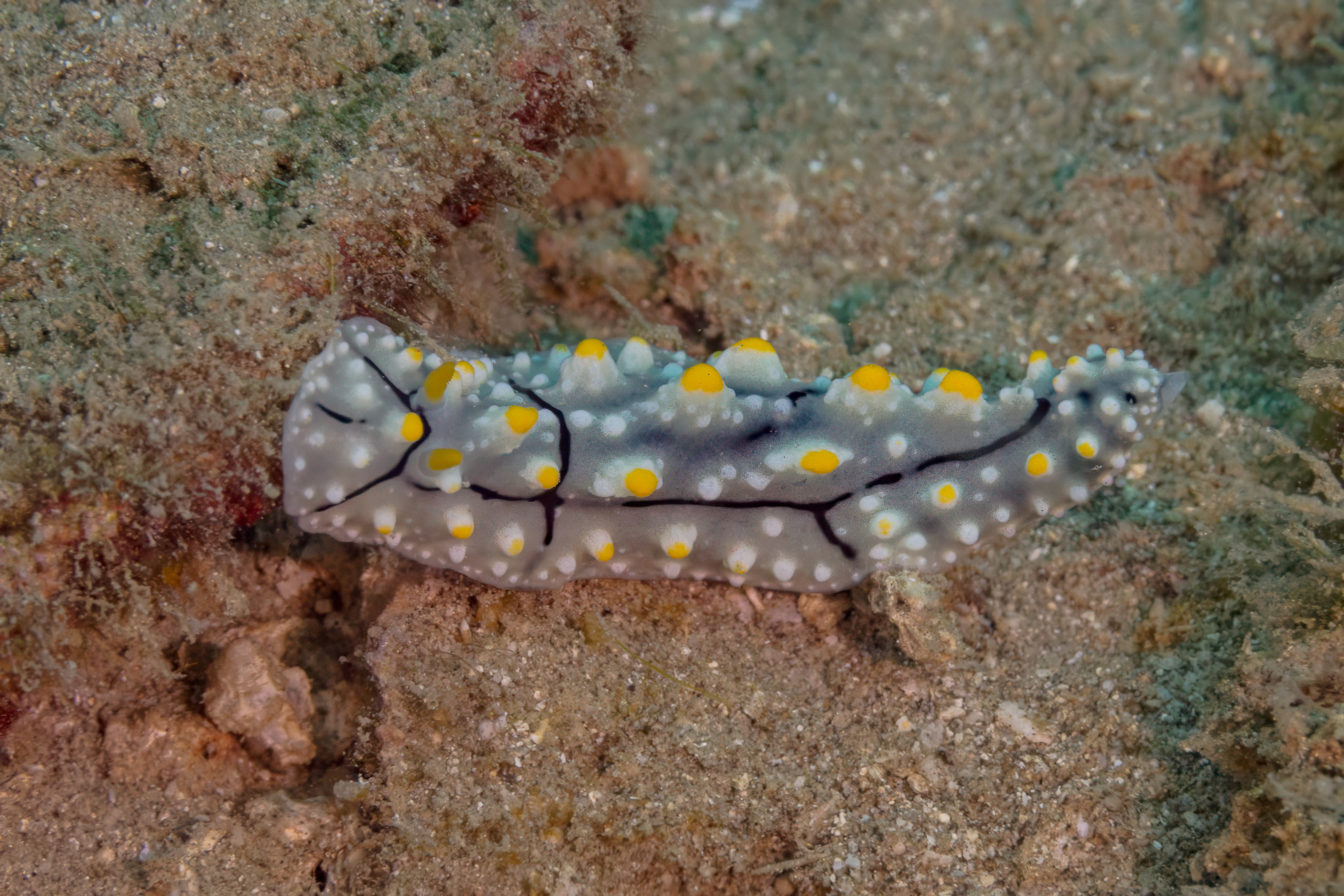
Top view

Phyllidia elegans, also known as the elegant phyllidia, is a species of sea slug, a dorid nudibranch, a shell-less marine gastropod mollusk in the family Phyllidiidae. It is found in shallow water in the Red Sea and the tropical Indo-Pacific region.

== Distribution ==
This species has been found in Indonesia, Malaysia, Thailand, the Andaman Sea, Myanmar, the Red Sea, the Mariana Islands, north Sulawesi, Vanuatu and Papua New Guinea.

== Description ==
This animal can be distinguished by a pale-coloured foot having a single median longitudinal black line on the sole, light pink dorsal tubercles commonly tipped in yellow, and black lines on the lateral margins of the sole.
