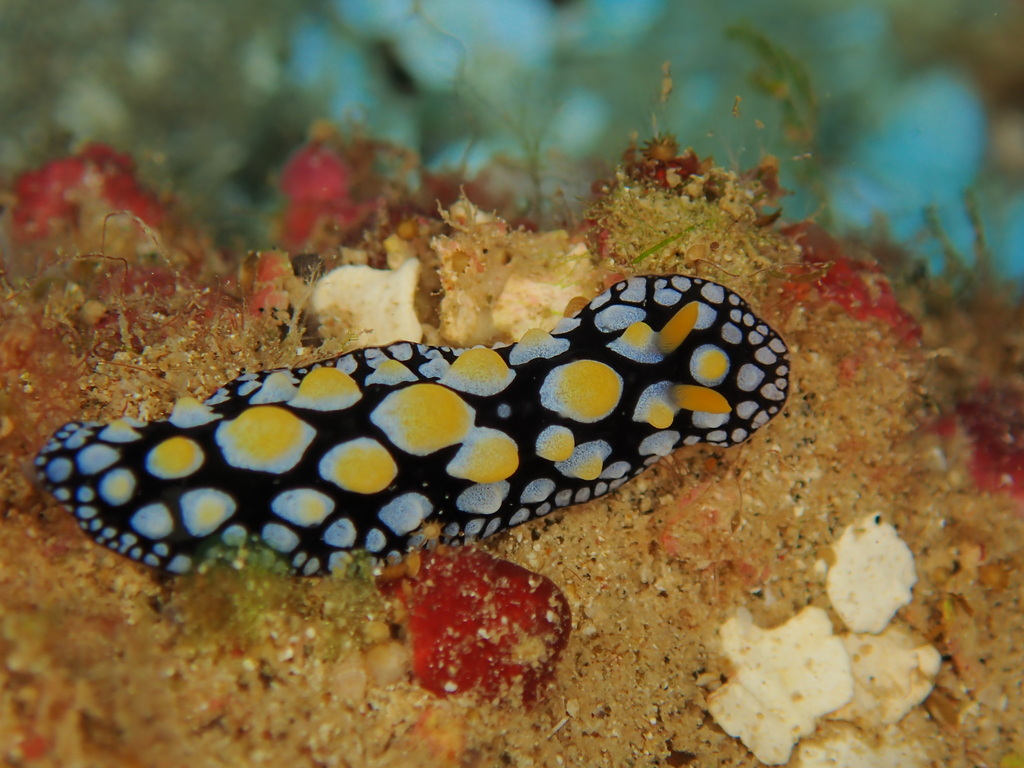

Scientific classification
- Kingdom: Animalia
- Phylum: Mollusca
- Class: Gastropoda
- Order: Nudibranchia
- Family: Phyllidiidae
- Genus: Phyllidia
- Species: P. guamensis

Binomial name
- Phyllidia guamensis (Brunckhorst, 1993)

Synonyms
- Fryeria guamensis Brunckhorst, 1993

= Phyllidia guamensis =

Species of gastropod

Phyllidia guamensis is a species of sea slug, a dorid nudibranch, a shell-less marine gastropod mollusk in the family Phyllidiidae.

== Distribution ==
This rare species was described from Guam. It has been reported from the Northern Mariana Islands and the Marquesas Islands.

== Description ==
This nudibranch has a black dorsum with large yellow-capped tubercles surrounded by pale blue rings. Towards the edge of the mantle these tubercles become small and increasingly numerous, without any yellow caps. The rhinophores are yellow.

== Diet ==
This species feeds on a sponge.
