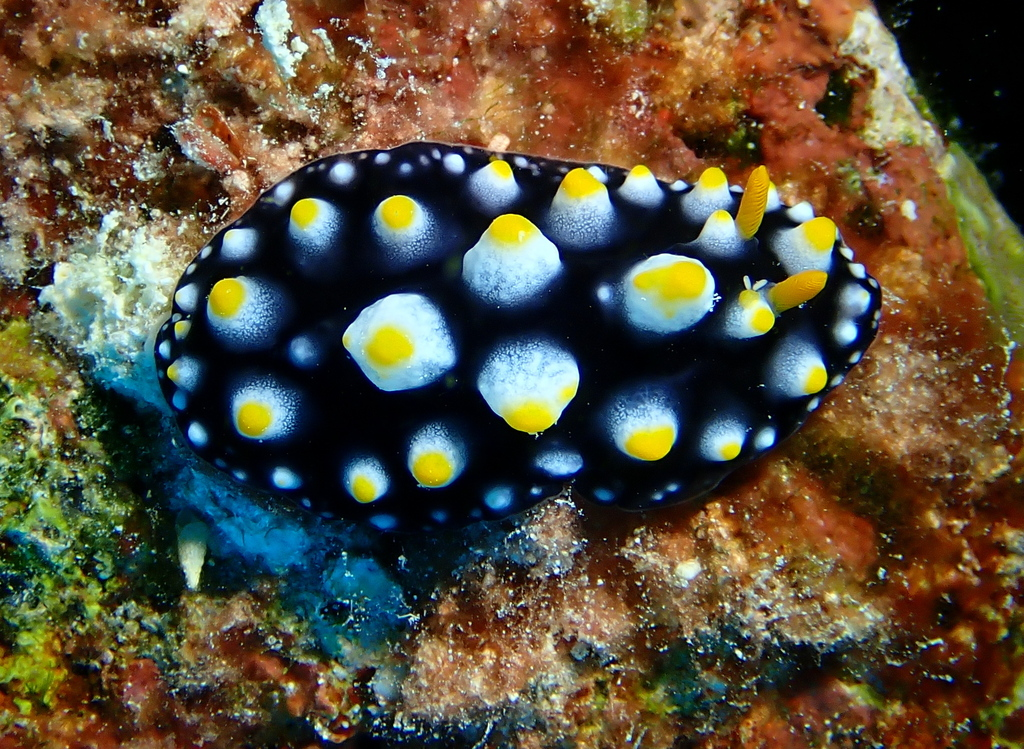

Scientific classification
- Kingdom: Animalia
- Phylum: Mollusca
- Class: Gastropoda
- Order: Nudibranchia
- Family: Phyllidiidae
- Genus: Phyllidia
- Species: P. madangensis

Binomial name
- Phyllidia madangensis Brunckhorst, 1993

= Phyllidia madangensis =

Species of gastropod

Phyllidia madangensis is a species of sea slug, a dorid nudibranch, a shell-less marine gastropod mollusk in the family Phyllidiidae.

== Distribution ==
This species was described from Madang, Papua New Guinea. It has been reported from Vanuatu and Sulawesi.

== Description ==
This nudibranch has a black dorsum with large yellow-capped tubercles surrounded by white, slightly translucent, rings. These rings are elongated towards the head and tail where they surround the larger tubercles in the middle of the dorsum. Towards the edge of the mantle these tubercles become smaller and scattered, the smallest without any yellow caps. The rhinophores are yellow. It is similar to Phyllidia carlsonhoffi but P. madangensis has a small white tubercle on the front edge of each rhinophore pocket, not directly in front of the rhinophore but situated towards the midline of the body. The sole of the foot in P. madangensis does not have a dark median line.

== Diet ==
This species feeds on a sponge.
