= Phyllidia goslineri =

Scientific classification
- Kingdom: Animalia
- Phylum: Mollusca
- Class: Gastropoda
- Order: Nudibranchia
- Family: Phyllidiidae
- Genus: Phyllidia
- Species: P. goslineri

Binomial name
- Phyllidia goslineri Brunckhorst, 1993

Species of gastropod

Phyllidia goslineri is a species of sea slug, a dorid nudibranch, a shell-less marine gastropod mollusk in the family Phyllidiidae.

== Distribution ==
This rare species was described from Madang, Papua New Guinea. It has also been found at Amami-Ooshima Islands, Japan.

== Description ==
This nudibranch has a cream coloured dorsum with smaller regularly spaced brown spots and larger pale brown blotches. The small brown spots are surrounded by pale fawn colour and the overall aspect is unlike other Phyllidia species, being reminiscent of Knoutsodonta depressa, which is camouflaged to look like a bryozoan. The rhinophores are cream. The entire dorsum is covered with small rounded tubercles.

== Diet ==
This species feeds on a sponge.
