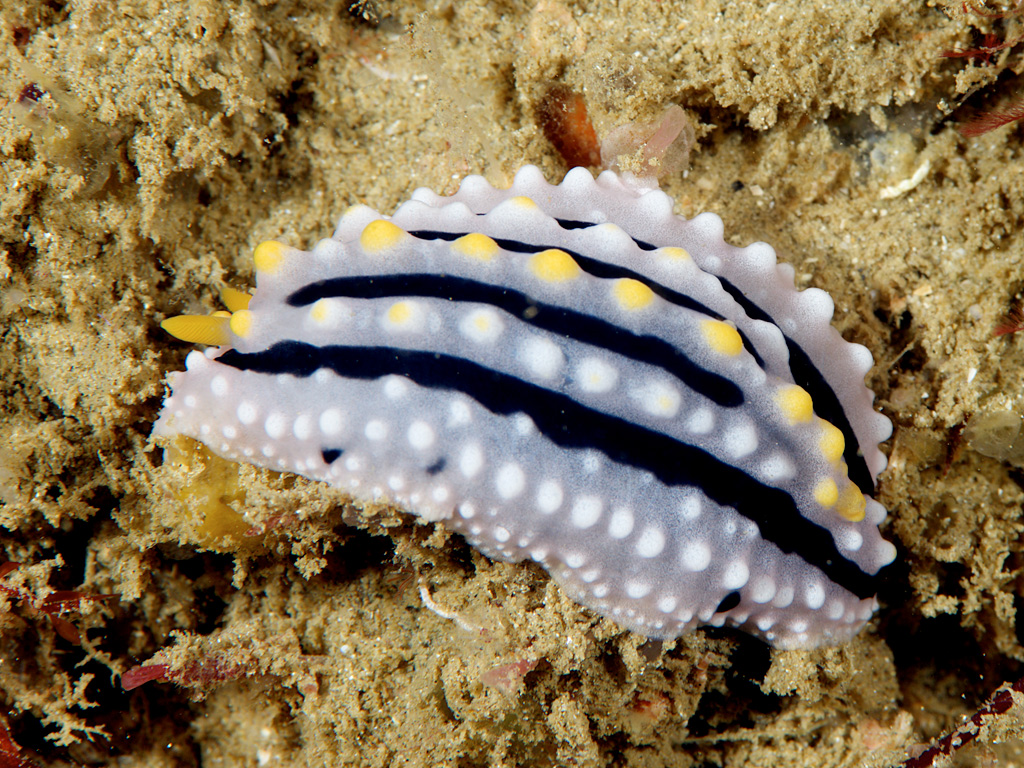
- The nudibranch Phyllidia alyta, head end towards the left, Unawatuna, Sri Lanka.

Scientific classification
- Kingdom: Animalia
- Phylum: Mollusca
- Class: Gastropoda
- Order: Nudibranchia
- Family: Phyllidiidae
- Genus: Phyllidia
- Species: P. alyta

Binomial name
- Phyllidia alyta Yonow, 1996

= Phyllidia alyta =

Species of gastropod

Phyllidia alyta is a species of sea slug, a dorid nudibranch, a shell-less marine gastropod mollusk in the family Phyllidiidae.

== Distribution ==
This species was described from Ari Atoll, Maldives. It has been found in the Indian Ocean from the Maldives, Mauritius, Réunion, Sri Lanka and Myanmar.

== Description ==
This nudibranch has a grey coloured dorsum with white tubercles in rows separated by four longitudinal black stripes. The rhinophores are yellow and some of the dorsal tubercles are tipped with yellow.

== Diet ==
This species feeds on sponges.
