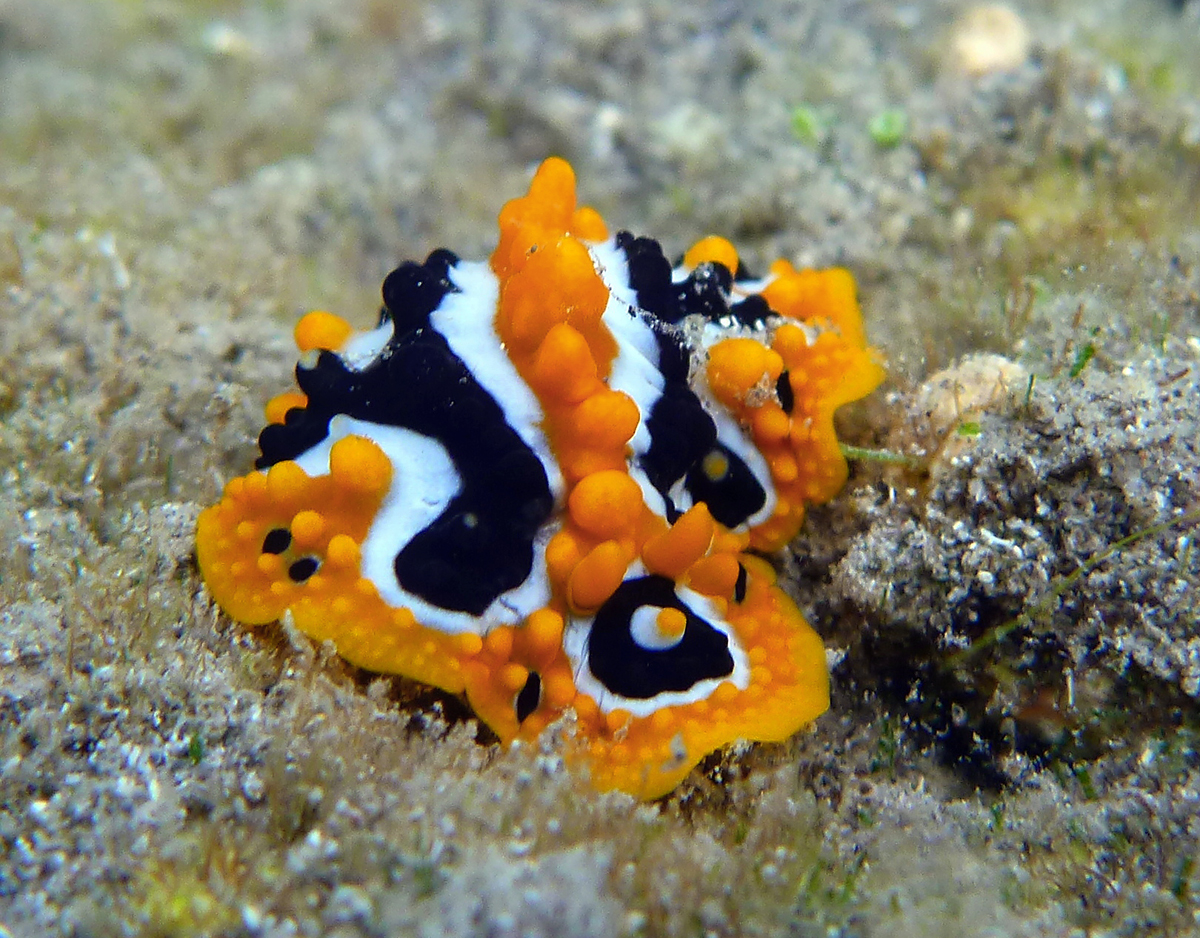
- The nudibranch, Phyllidia undula, Réunion

Scientific classification
- Kingdom: Animalia
- Phylum: Mollusca
- Class: Gastropoda
- Order: Nudibranchia
- Family: Phyllidiidae
- Genus: Phyllidia
- Species: P. undula

Binomial name
- Phyllidia undula Yonow, 1986

= Phyllidia undula =

Species of gastropod

Phyllidia undula is a species of sea slug, a dorid nudibranch, a shell-less marine gastropod mollusk in the family Phyllidiidae.

== Description ==
This species has previously been confused with Phyllidia ocellata.

== Distribution ==
This species was described from the Red Sea. It appears to be confined to the western Indian Ocean including the Red Sea, the African coast and the Island of Réunion.

== Diet ==
This species feeds on a sponge.
