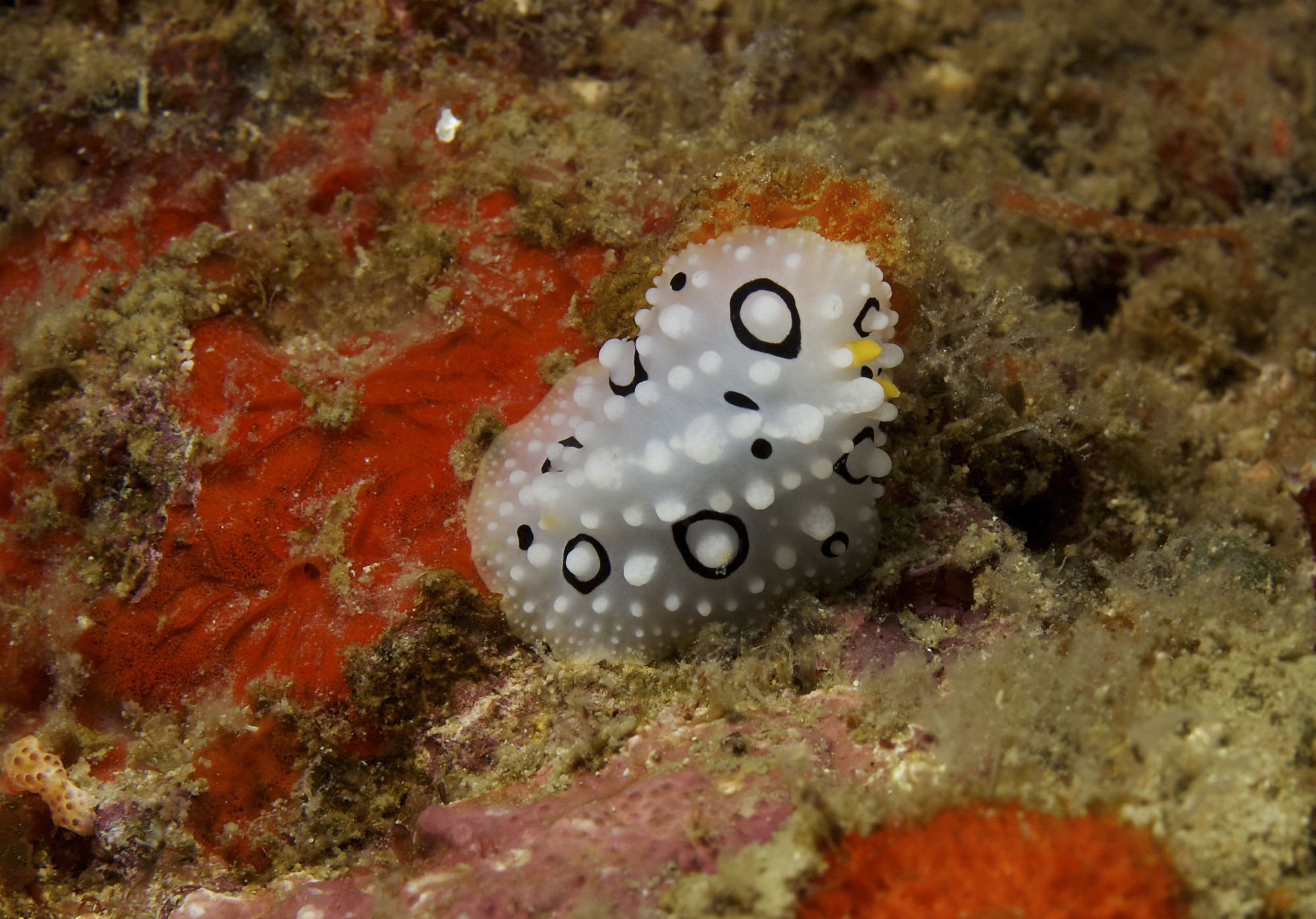
- .

Scientific classification
- Kingdom: Animalia
- Phylum: Mollusca
- Class: Gastropoda
- Order: Nudibranchia
- Family: Phyllidiidae
- Genus: Phyllidia
- Species: P. willani

Binomial name
- Phyllidia willani Brunckhorst, 1993

= Phyllidia willani =

Species of gastropod

Phyllidia willani is a species of sea slug, a dorid nudibranch, a shell-less marine gastropod mollusk in the family Phyllidiidae.

== Distribution ==
The holotype of this species was collected at Mactan Island, Philippines. Additional specimens from Madang, Papua New Guinea were included in the original description.

== Description ==
This nudibranch has a translucent mantle heavily spotted with opaque white. There are large yellow-capped tubercles in the middle of the back, becoming smaller and without yellow caps towards the edges of the mantle. There are two longitudinal black lines along the back which sometimes surround the tubercles and which may be broken.

== Diet ==
This species feeds on a sponge.
