= Phyllidia ovata =

Scientific classification
- Kingdom: Animalia
- Phylum: Mollusca
- Class: Gastropoda
- Order: Nudibranchia
- Family: Phyllidiidae
- Genus: Phyllidia
- Species: P. ovata

Binomial name
- Phyllidia ovata Wägele, Raubold, Papu, Undap & Yonow, 2025

Species of nudibranch

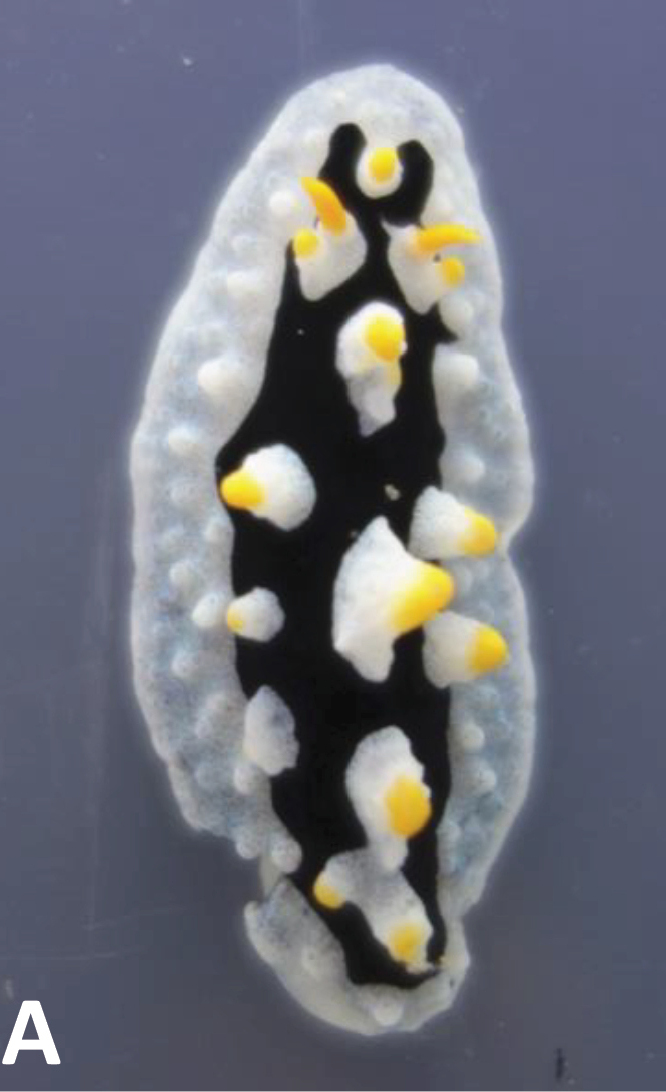
dorsal view of Phyllidia ovata

Phyllidia ovata is a nudibranch species discovered by five women scientists from Germany, Indonesia, and Wales. The species' name comes from its unique egg-like oval shape, one of the most noticeable features of the nudibranch. The nudibranch's tubercules are vibrant and white with yellow tips. The nudibranch is medium-sized with its length reaching up to 5 cm (2 in). This species inhabits coral reefs in the Indo-Pacific region.
