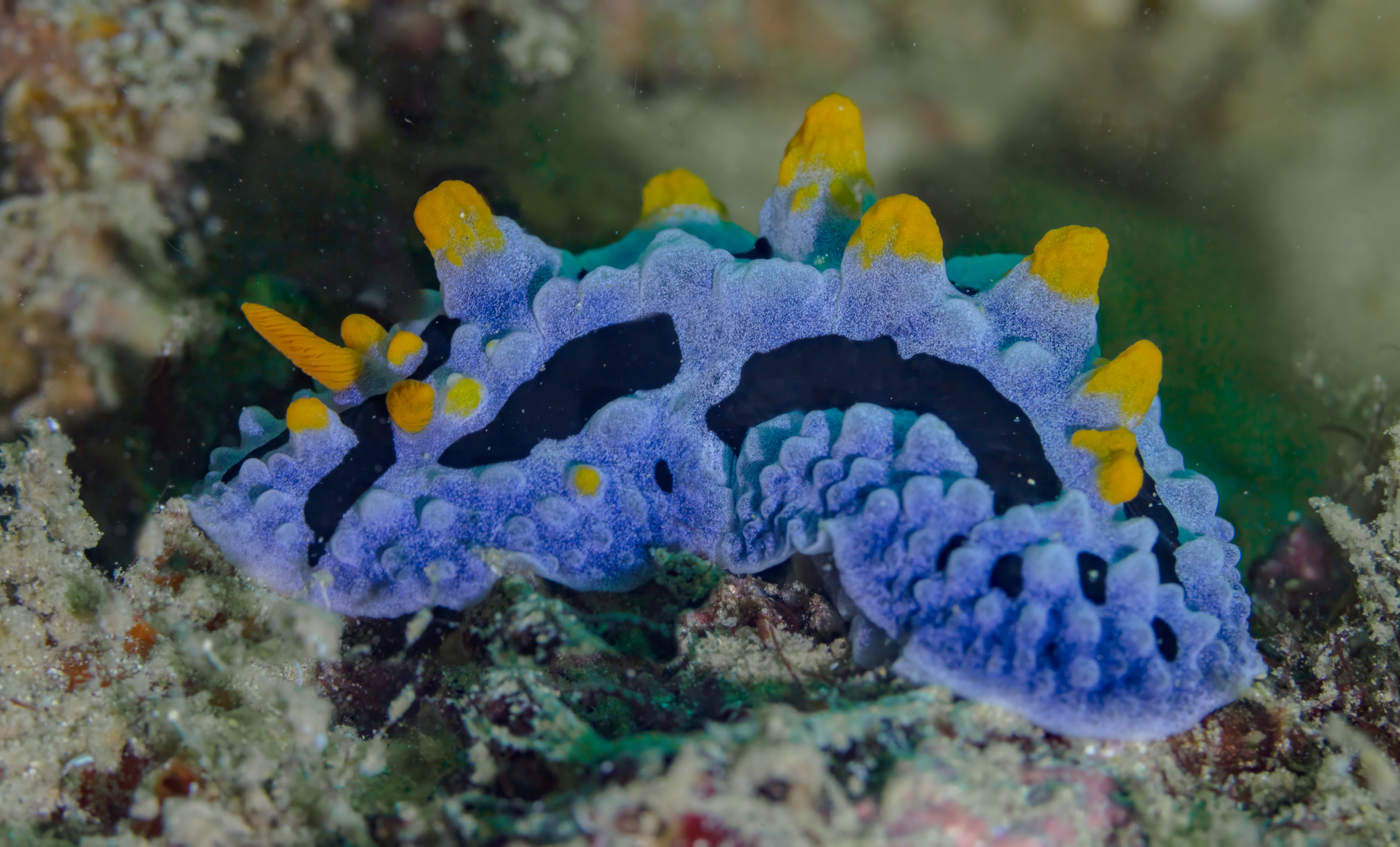
- at Anilao, Philippines

Scientific classification
- Kingdom: Animalia
- Phylum: Mollusca
- Class: Gastropoda
- Order: Nudibranchia
- Family: Phyllidiidae
- Genus: Phyllidia
- Species: P. coelestis

Binomial name
- Phyllidia coelestis Bergh, 1905

Synonyms
- Phyllidia alia Yonow, 1984

= Phyllidia coelestis =

Species of gastropod

Phyllidia coelestis is a species of sea slug, a nudibranch, a shell-less marine gastropod mollusc in the family Phyllidiidae.

== Distribution and habitat ==
This species occurs in the tropical Indo/West-Pacific. It lives on the external slope of coral reefs, on top of the reef and in the lagoon, also down to 30 m in depth. Found in the western Pacific Ocean, South China Sea, Timor Sea and across the Indian Ocean to South Africa.

== Description ==
This sea slug is up to 6 cm in length. The body is elongated and slug-shaped. The mantle has a grey-blue background color; the margin is covered with many small tubercles. Bigger tubercles that are yellow capped, run along the median line.

There are also three black longitudinal lines. Two of them are on each side of the mantle, and one on a median line ending on the anterior part as a "Y". This particular line shape constitutes a distinctive element to identify this species.

In this species the rhinophores possess lamellae, and are yellow in color.

== Behaviour ==
This species is benthic and diurnal. Because of its aposematic colors, it is able to crawl around in the daylight to feed. Phyllidia coelestis has a diet based on sponges.
