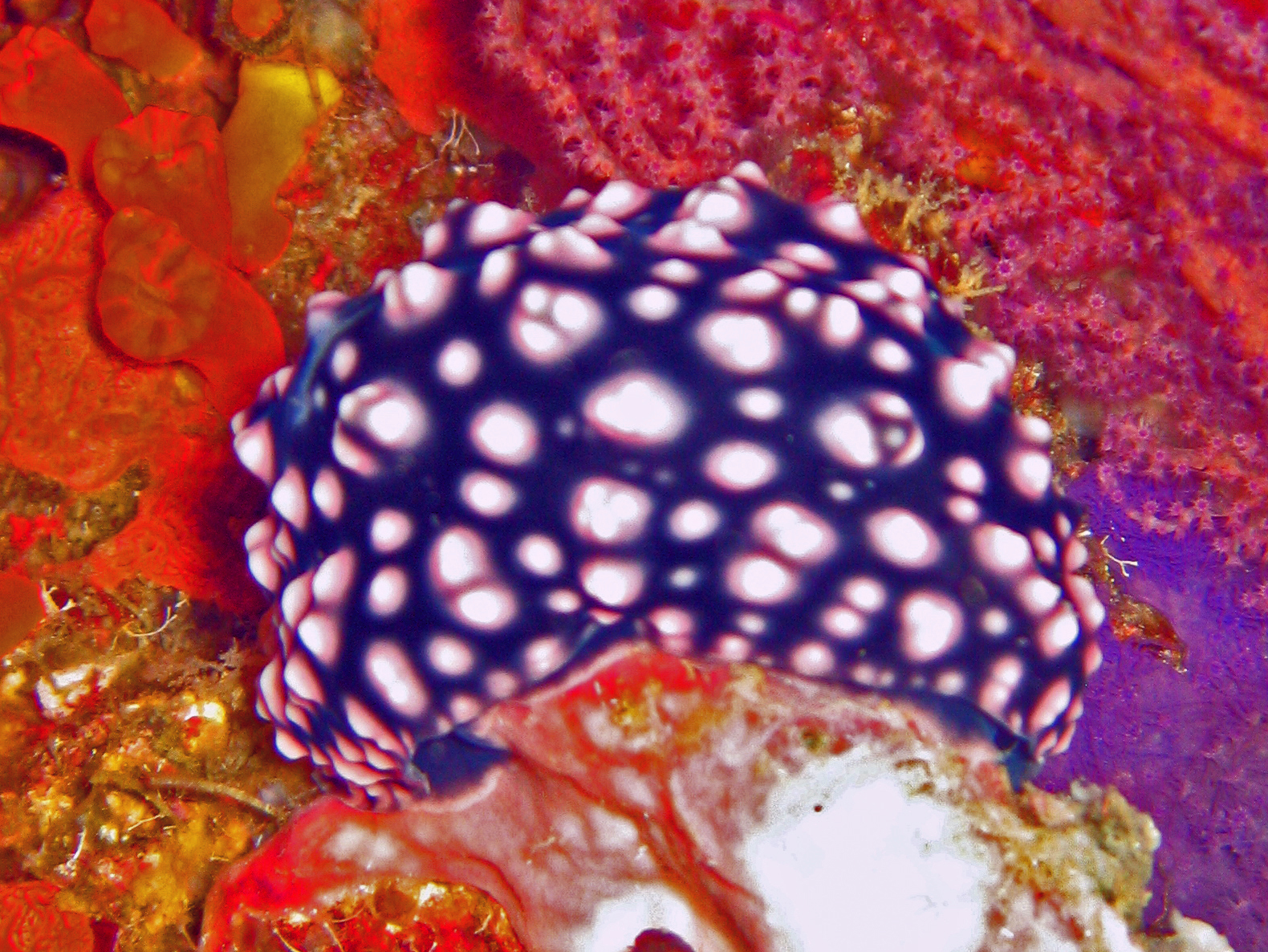
- A live individual of Phyllidiella nigra in situ in Philippines

Scientific classification
- Kingdom: Animalia
- Phylum: Mollusca
- Class: Gastropoda
- Order: Nudibranchia
- Family: Phyllidiidae
- Genus: Phyllidiella
- Species: P. nigra

Binomial name
- Phyllidiella nigra (van Hasselt, 1824)

= Phyllidiella nigra =

Species of gastropod

Phyllidiella nigra is a species of sea slug, a dorid nudibranch, a shell-less marine gastropod mollusk in the family Phyllidiidae.

== Description ==
Phyllidiella nigra can reach a length of about 25–75 millimetres (0.98–2.95 in). It shows a black background with rounded pink to purplish tubercles over the dorsum. These tubercles are mainly isolated or in small clumps.

== Bibliography ==
- Brunckhorst, D.J. (1993) The systematics and phylogeny of Phyllidiid Nudibranchs (Doridoidea). Records of the Australian Museum, Supplement 16: 1–107.
