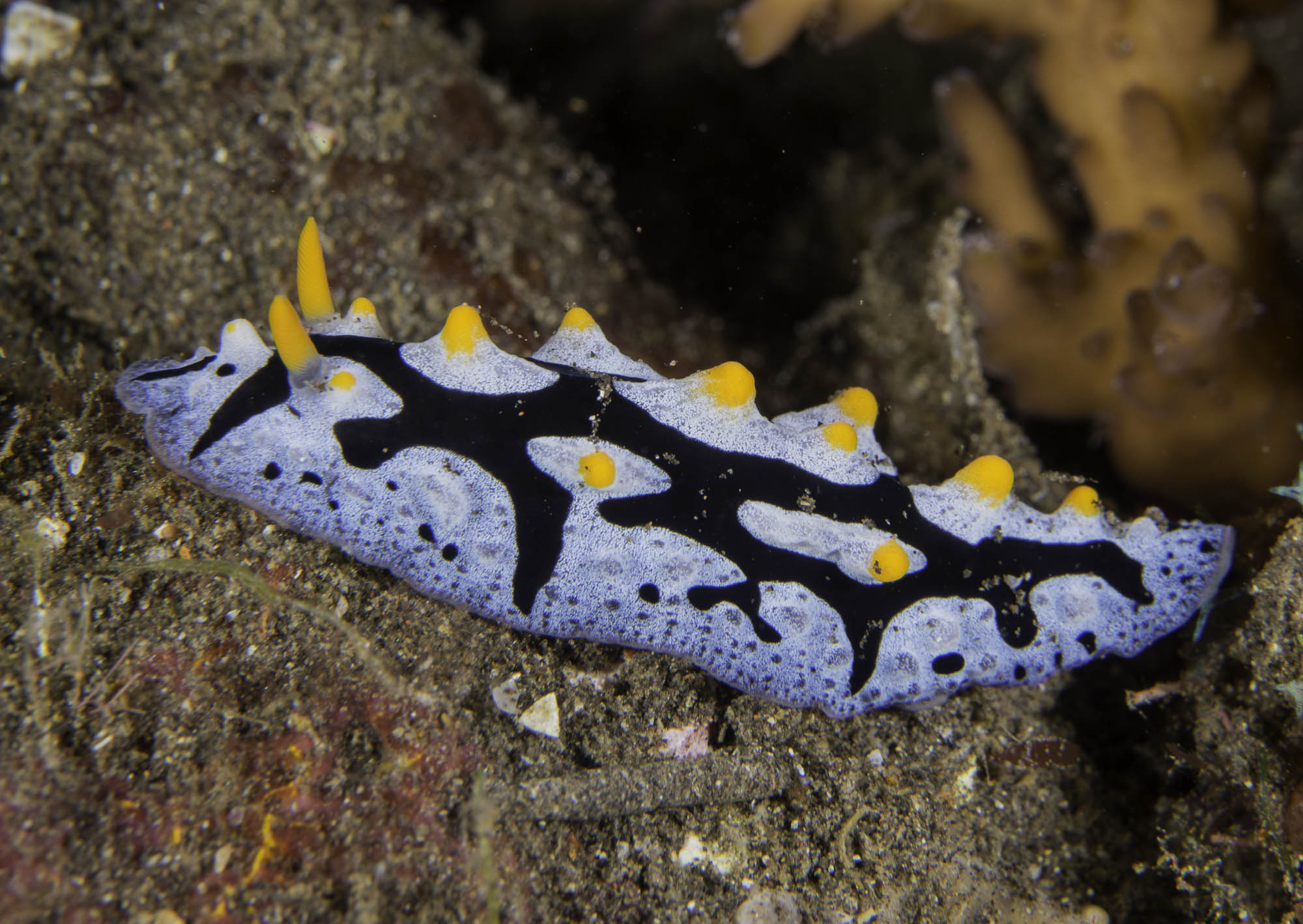
- The nudibranch Phyllidia picta, Tulamben, Bali, Indonesia.

Scientific classification
- Kingdom: Animalia
- Phylum: Mollusca
- Class: Gastropoda
- Order: Nudibranchia
- Family: Phyllidiidae
- Genus: Phyllidia
- Species: P. picta

Binomial name
- Phyllidia picta (Pruvot-Fol, 1957)

Synonyms
- Fryeria menindie (Brunckhorst, 1993)

= Phyllidia picta =

Species of gastropod

Phyllidia picta is a species of sea slug, a dorid nudibranch, a shell-less marine gastropod mollusk in the family Phyllidiidae.

== Distribution ==
This species has been reported from Malaysia to Indonesia, the Philippines, north-west Australia and the western Pacific Ocean including Fiji, the Solomon Islands and Vanuatu.

== Description ==
This nudibranch has a pattern of black on the dorsum interrupted by large yellow-capped tubercles surrounded by pale blue patches. The blue areas coalesce towards the edge of the mantle and the tubercles become smaller, the smallest without yellow caps. The rhinophores are yellow.

== Diet ==
This species feeds on a sponge.
