= Phyllidiopsis dautzenbergi =

Scientific classification
- Kingdom: Animalia
- Phylum: Mollusca
- Class: Gastropoda
- Order: Nudibranchia
- Family: Phyllidiidae
- Genus: Phyllidiopsis
- Species: P. dautzenbergi

Binomial name
- Phyllidiopsis dautzenbergi (Vayssière, 1912)

Synonyms
- Phyllidia dautzenbergi Vayssière, 1912

Species of gastropod

Phyllidiopsis bayi is a species of sea slug, a dorid nudibranch, a shell-less marine gastropod mollusk in the family Phyllidiidae.

== Distribution ==
This species was described from the Red Sea. It is endemic to the southern Red Sea and the Gulf of Aden.

== Description ==
This nudibranch has a translucent white dorsum with black lines creating a central ring with lines running off at right angles to the margin. At the margin they widen slightly, giving the appearance of cut-off circular patches of white. It is a small Phyllidiid, growing to 20 mm in length.

== Diet ==
This species feeds on a sponge.
