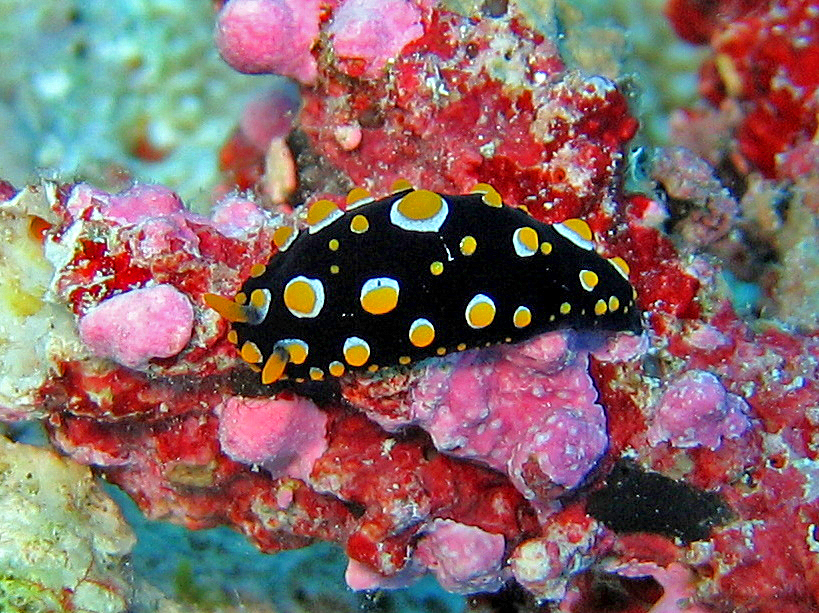
- A live individual of Phyllidia cf. carlsonhoffi in situ, head end towards the left

Scientific classification
- Kingdom: Animalia
- Phylum: Mollusca
- Class: Gastropoda
- Order: Nudibranchia
- Family: Phyllidiidae
- Genus: Phyllidia
- Species: P. carlsonhoffi

Binomial name
- Phyllidia carlsonhoffi Brunckhorst, 1993

= Phyllidia carlsonhoffi =

Species of gastropod

Phyllidia carlsonhoffi is a species of sea slug, a dorid nudibranch, a shell-less marine gastropod mollusk in the family Phyllidiidae.

== Description ==
Phyllidia carlsonhoffi has a black body with small rounded yellow tubercles and more or less regularly distributed large conical yellow tubercles in the center of white rings. The ventral surface is a pale cream color, with a median black line on the bottom of the foot sole. The oral tentacles are long and cylindrical.

== Distribution ==
This species has been found in western Pacific Ocean (Micronesia, Papua New Guinea and Fiji).

== Habitat ==
This nudibranch prefers shallow subtidal lagoons, on the reefs, and seaward slopes, at depths of 1–25 meters.

== Bibliography ==
- Gary R. McDonald, University of California Santa Cruz - Nudibranch Systematic Index
- Brunckhorst, D.J. (1993) The systematics and phylogeny of Phyllidiid Nudibranchs (Doridoidea). Records of the Australian Museum, Supplement 16: 1-107.
