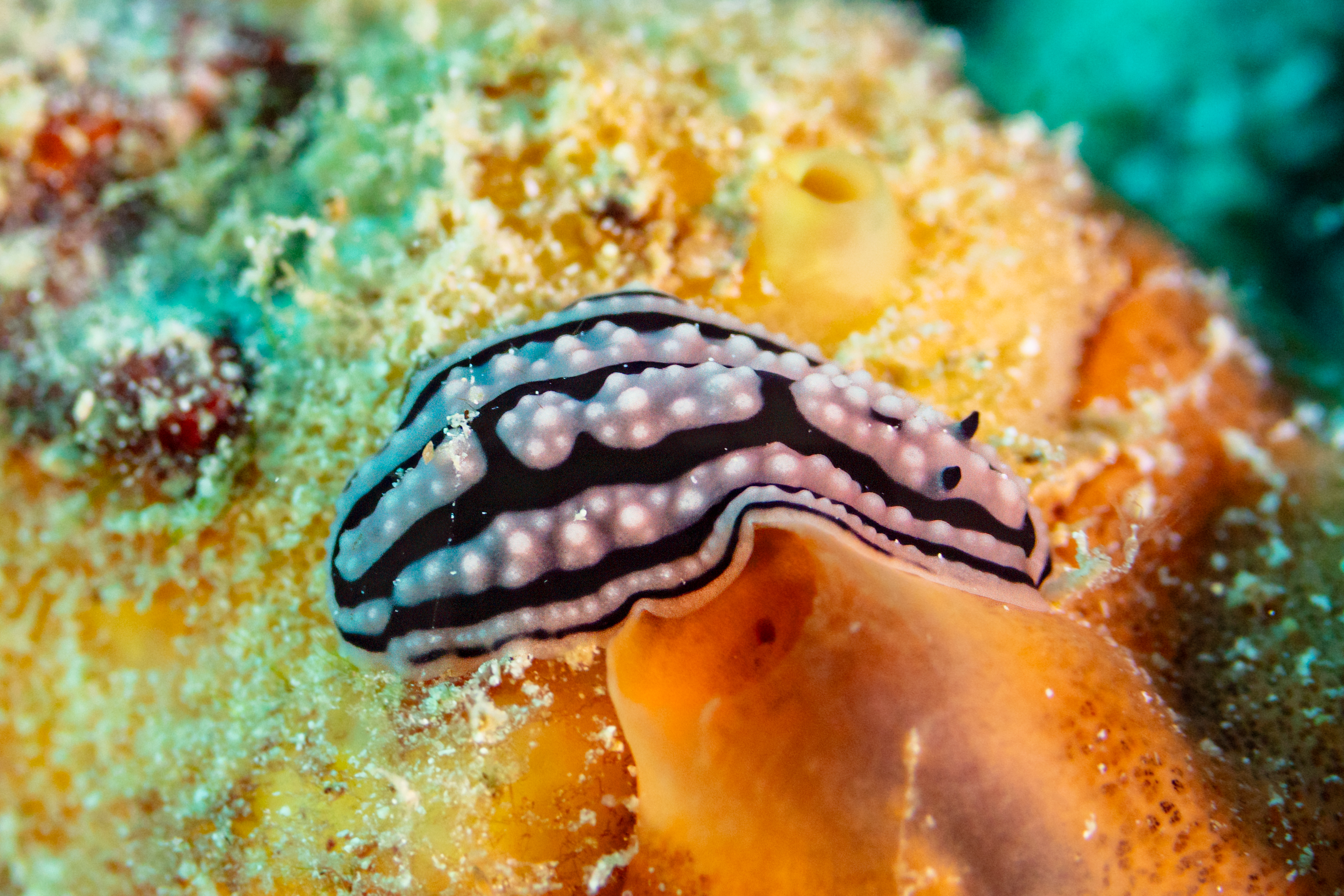
- A live individual of Phyllidiella zeylanica, head end towards the right

Scientific classification
- Domain: Eukaryota
- Kingdom: Animalia
- Phylum: Mollusca
- Class: Gastropoda
- Order: Nudibranchia
- Superfamily: Phyllidioidea
- Family: Phyllidiidae
- Genus: Phyllidiella
- Species: P. zeylanica

Binomial name
- Phyllidiella zeylanica (Kelaart, 1859)

Synonyms
- Phyllidia zeylanica

= Phyllidiella zeylanica =

Species of gastropod

Phyllidiella zeylanica is a species of sea slug, a dorid nudibranch, a shell-less marine gastropod mollusk in the family Phyllidiidae.

== Distribution ==
This species was described from Sri Lanka. It is reported throughout the tropical Indian Ocean, where it occurs from eastern Africa to Java.

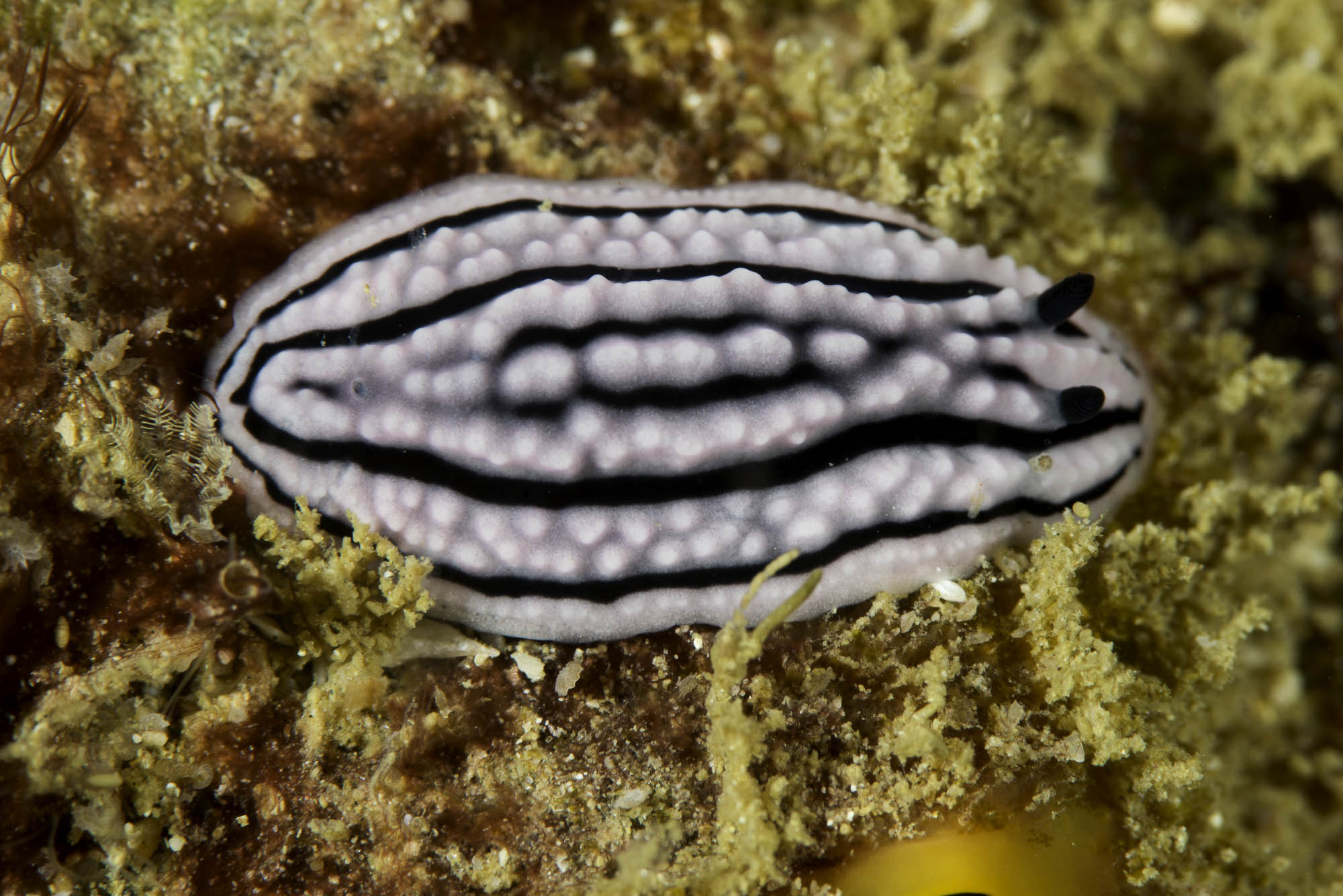
Phyllidiella zeylanica, Mirissa, Sri Lanka.

== Description ==
Phyllidiella zeylanica is characterised by its numerous, very tuberculate, pink ridges which curve to join anteriorly and posteriorly (but may be interrupted), its pale foot sole, and its dark triangular oral tentacles. It differs from Phyllidiella pustulosa which does not possess ridges, and from Phyllidiella rosans, which possesses relatively smooth rounded ridges (very tuberculate in P. zeylanica). For specimens of similar size, the rhinophoral clavus of P. zeylanica possesses fewer lamellae than P. rosans.
