= Phyllidiella backeljaui =

Scientific classification
- Domain: Eukaryota
- Kingdom: Animalia
- Phylum: Mollusca
- Class: Gastropoda
- Order: Nudibranchia
- Superfamily: Phyllidioidea
- Family: Phyllidiidae
- Genus: Phyllidiella
- Species: P. backeljaui

Binomial name
- Phyllidiella backeljaui Dominguez, Quintas & Troncoso, 2007

Species of gastropod

Phyllidiella backeljaui is a species of sea slug, a dorid nudibranch, a shell-less marine gastropod mollusk in the family Phyllidiidae.

== Distribution ==
This species was described from Laing Island, Papua New Guinea.

== Description ==
This nudibranch has a pale pink dorsum with white-capped compound tubercles in the middle part, reducing in size to single tubercles at the margin. There are two narrow black lines which run in a wavy pattern between the tubercle groups, joining at the tail. Connecting black lines run across the body and down the sides and there is a narrow black margin to the mantle. The rhinophores are black.

== Diet ==
This species feeds on sponges.
