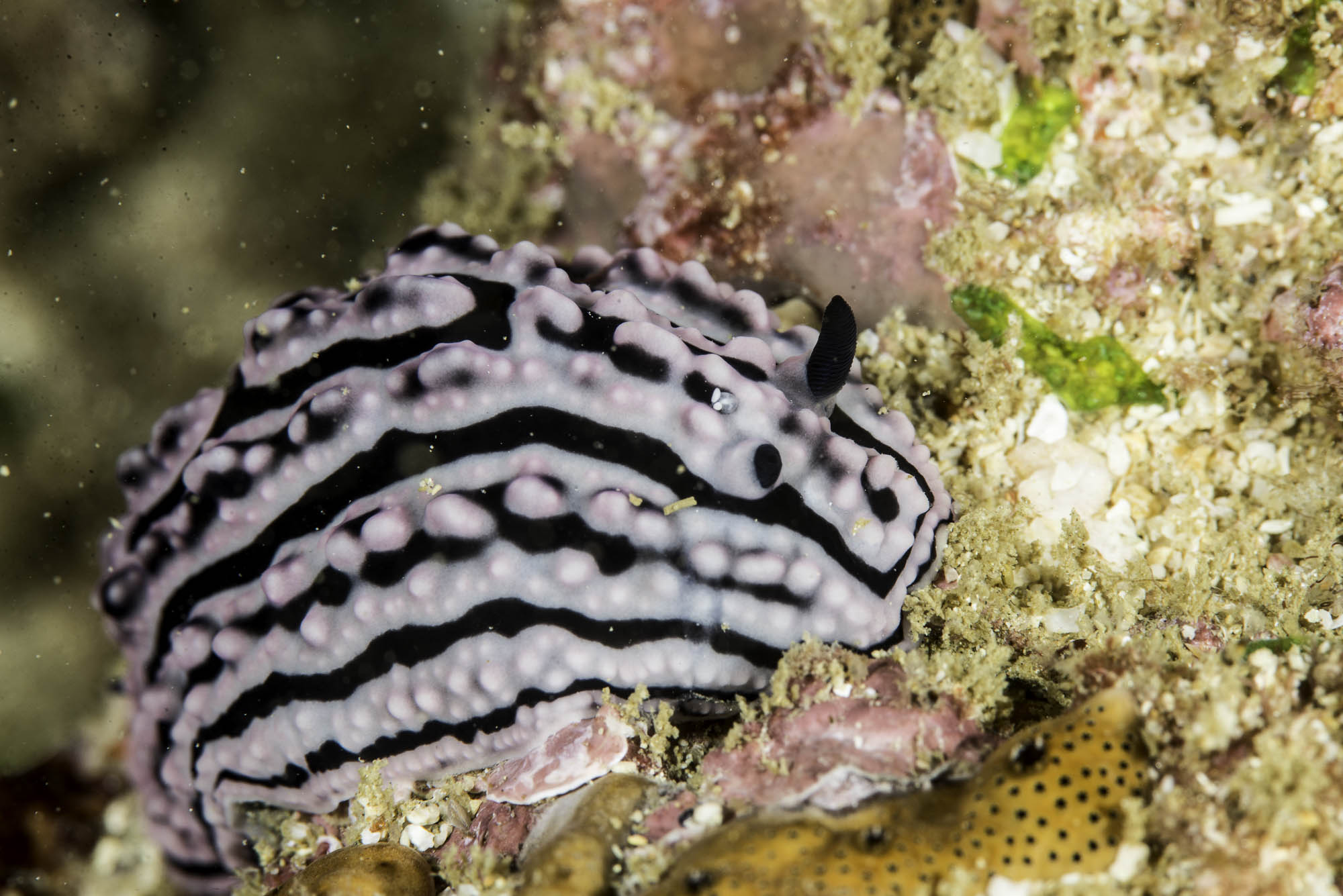
- The nudibranch Phyllidiella meandrina, Sri Lanka.

Scientific classification
- Kingdom: Animalia
- Phylum: Mollusca
- Class: Gastropoda
- Order: Nudibranchia
- Family: Phyllidiidae
- Genus: Phyllidiella
- Species: P. meandrina

Binomial name
- Phyllidiella meandrina (Pruvot-Fol, 1957)

Synonyms
- Phyllidia meandrina Pruvot-Fol, 1957; Phyllidiella sudanensis (Heller & Thompson, 1983)

= Phyllidiella meandrina =

Species of gastropod

Phyllidiella meandrina is a species of sea slug, a dorid nudibranch, a shell-less marine gastropod mollusk in the family Phyllidiidae.

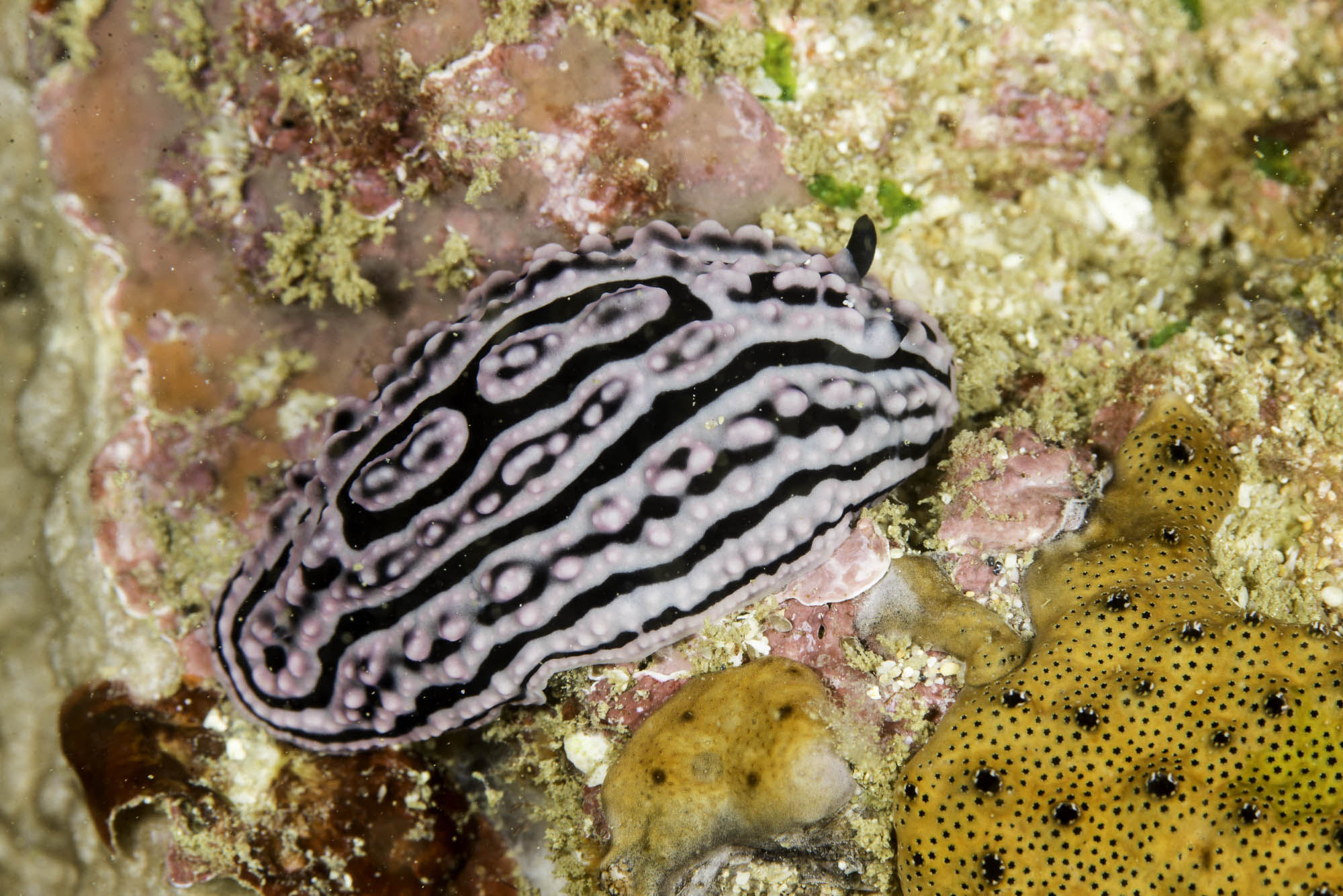
The nudibranch Phyllidiella meandrina, Sri Lanka.

== Distribution ==
This species was first collected in Mauritius. It was confused with Phyllidiella annulata by Brunckhorst. It is a frequent species in Mauritius and Réunion.

== Description ==
This nudibranch has a black dorsum with longitudinal pink ridges at the sides of the mantle and a series of oval rings in the centre of the back. The rhinophores are black.

== Diet ==
This species feeds on sponges.
