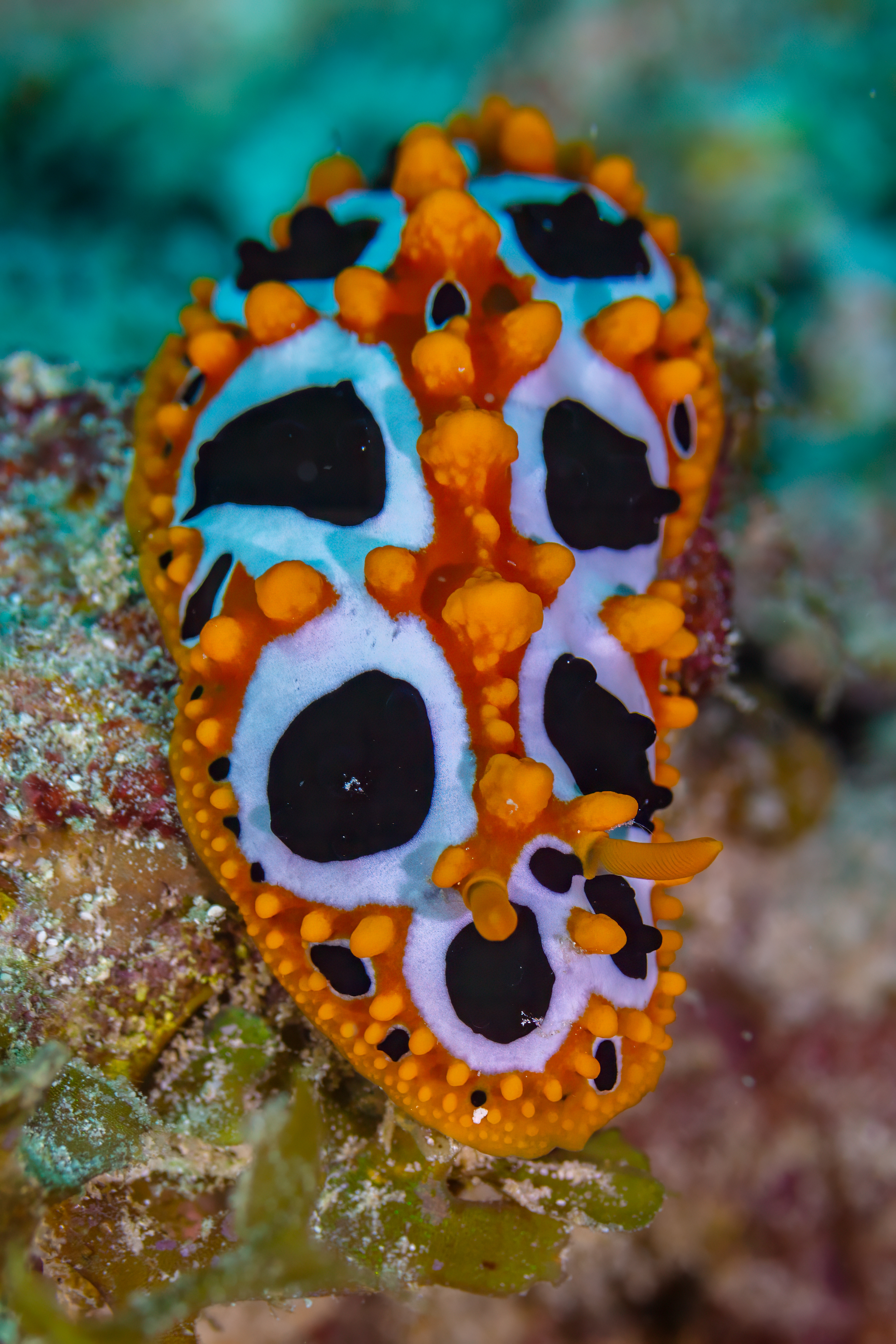

Scientific classification
- Domain: Eukaryota
- Kingdom: Animalia
- Phylum: Mollusca
- Class: Gastropoda
- Order: Nudibranchia
- Superfamily: Phyllidioidea
- Family: Phyllidiidae
- Genus: Phyllidia
- Species: P. ocellata

Binomial name
- Phyllidia ocellata Cuvier, 1804

= Phyllidia ocellata =

Species of gastropod

Phyllidia ocellata is a species of sea slug, a dorid nudibranch, a shell-less marine gastropod mollusk in the family Phyllidiidae.

== Distribution ==
This species is probably confined to the central Indo-West Pacific Ocean. It is common in Indonesia and occurs from Malaysia to the Solomon Islands.

== Description ==
This animal can measure up to 35 mm in length. It has been confused with Phyllidia japonica, Phyllidia multituberculata and Phyllidia undula and a number of other species by most workers. This nudibranch has an orange-brown dorsum interrupted by large white or grey, compound, stalked tubercles. These tubercles are distributed along a line from between the rhinophores to the tail, with more scattered and mostly smaller tubercles towards the mantle edge. There are four black rings surrounding tubercles which are placed symmetrically in the middle region of the back. Large individuals may have two more black patches towards the tail, or two more tubercles surrounded by black rings. A single tubercle in front of the rhinophores is also surrounded by a black ring. The rhinophores are orange-yellow.

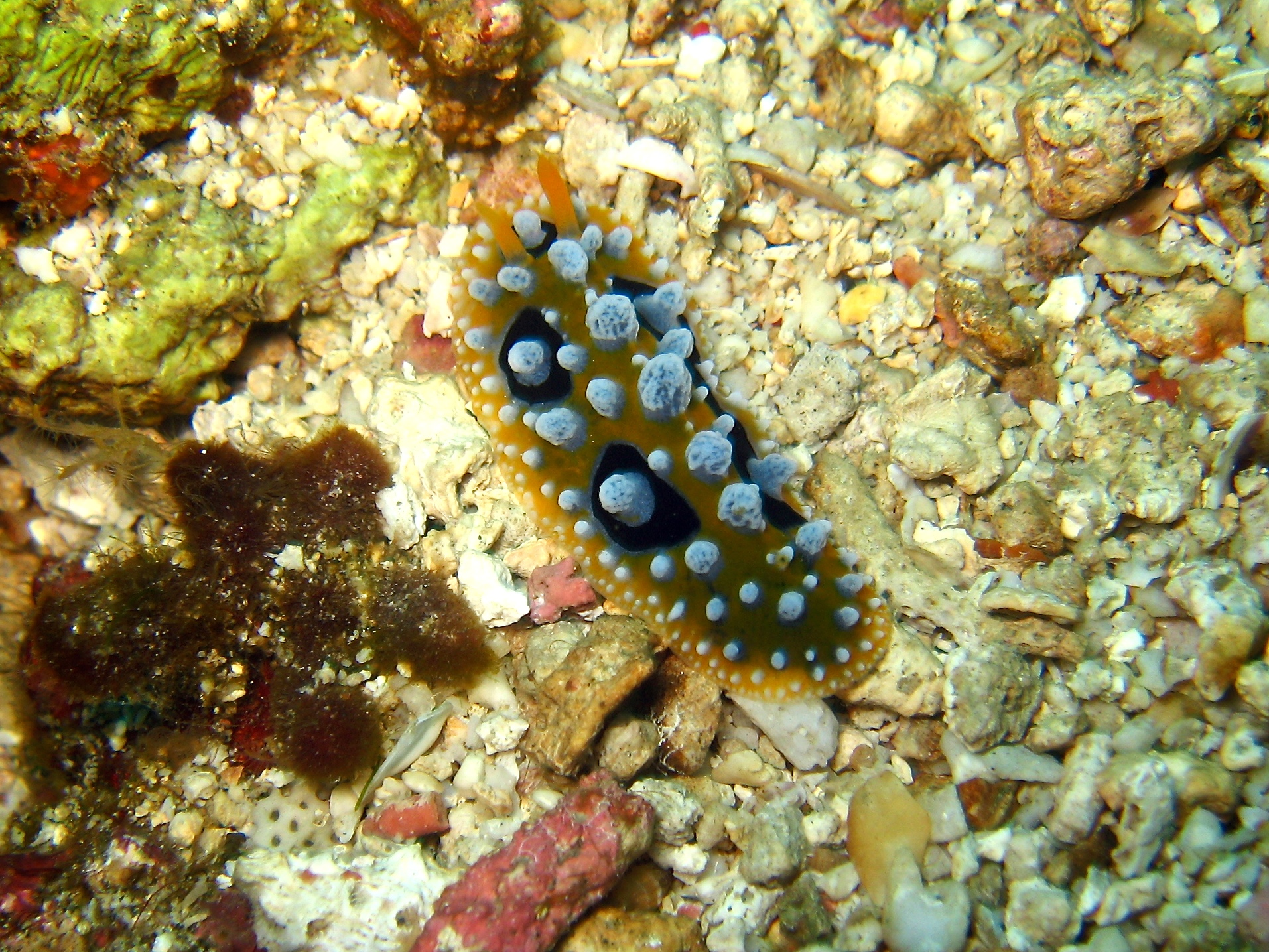
Phyllidia ocellata at Verde Island, the Philippines.

== Ecology ==
Like many nudibranchs, Phyllidia ocellata feeds on sponges.
