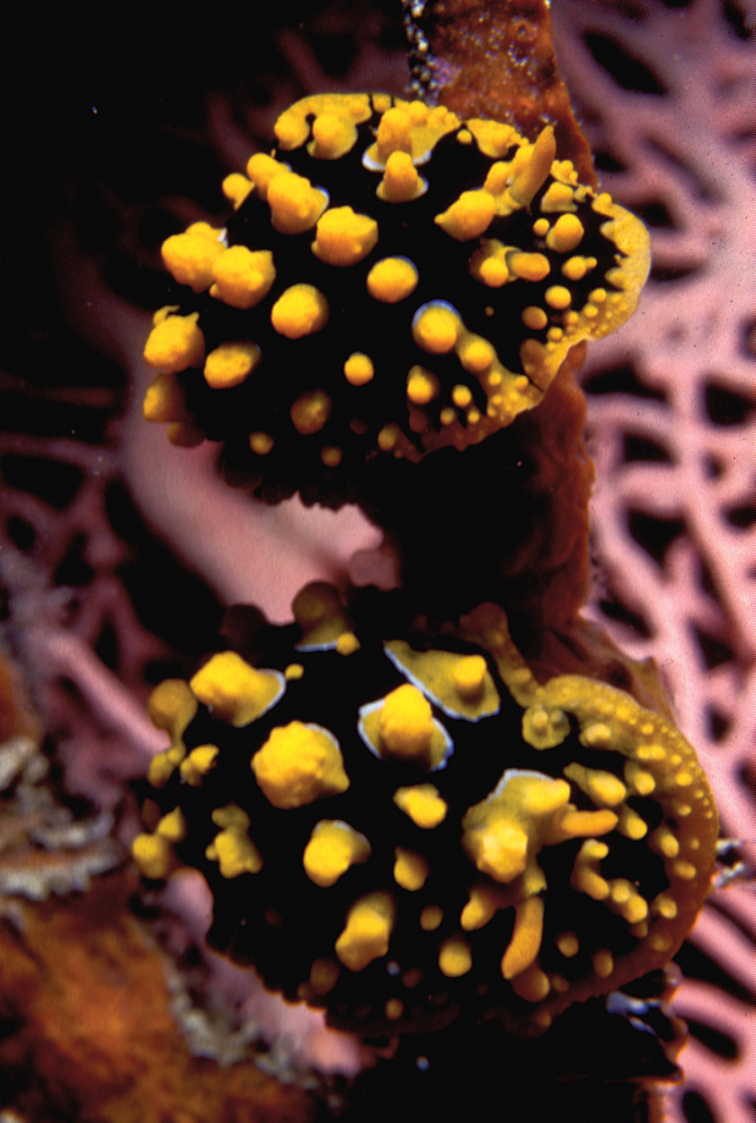
- Phyllidia multituberculata

Scientific classification
- Domain: Eukaryota
- Kingdom: Animalia
- Phylum: Mollusca
- Class: Gastropoda
- Order: Nudibranchia
- Superfamily: Phyllidioidea
- Family: Phyllidiidae
- Genus: Phyllidia
- Species: P. multituberculata

Binomial name
- Phyllidia multituberculata C. R. Boettger, 1918

= Phyllidia multituberculata =

Species of gastropod

Phyllidia multituberculata is a species of sea slug, a dorid nudibranch, a shell-less marine gastropod mollusk in the family Phyllidiidae.

== Distribution ==
This species was described from Pulu Bambu in the Aru Islands, south-west of Papua New Guinea. It has been reported from the Indian Ocean.

== Description ==
This species has previously been confused with Phyllidia ocellata. This species is bilaterally symmetric and reproduces sexually.

== Diet ==
This species feeds on a sponge.
