= Phyllidiella molaensis =

Scientific classification
- Domain: Eukaryota
- Kingdom: Animalia
- Phylum: Mollusca
- Class: Gastropoda
- Order: Nudibranchia
- Superfamily: Phyllidioidea
- Family: Phyllidiidae
- Genus: Phyllidiella
- Species: P. molaensis

Binomial name
- Phyllidiella molaensis (Meyer, 1977)

Synonyms
- Phyllidiopsis molaensis Meyer, 1977

Species of gastropod

Phyllidiella molaensis is a species of sea slug, a dorid nudibranch, a shell-less marine gastropod mollusk in the family Phyllidiidae.

== Distribution ==
This species was described from the Caribbean Sea coast of Panama. It has been reported from Costa Rica.

== Description ==
This nudibranch is white with a pattern of black concentric rings. The rhinophores are black with white tips.

== Diet ==
This species feeds on sponges.
