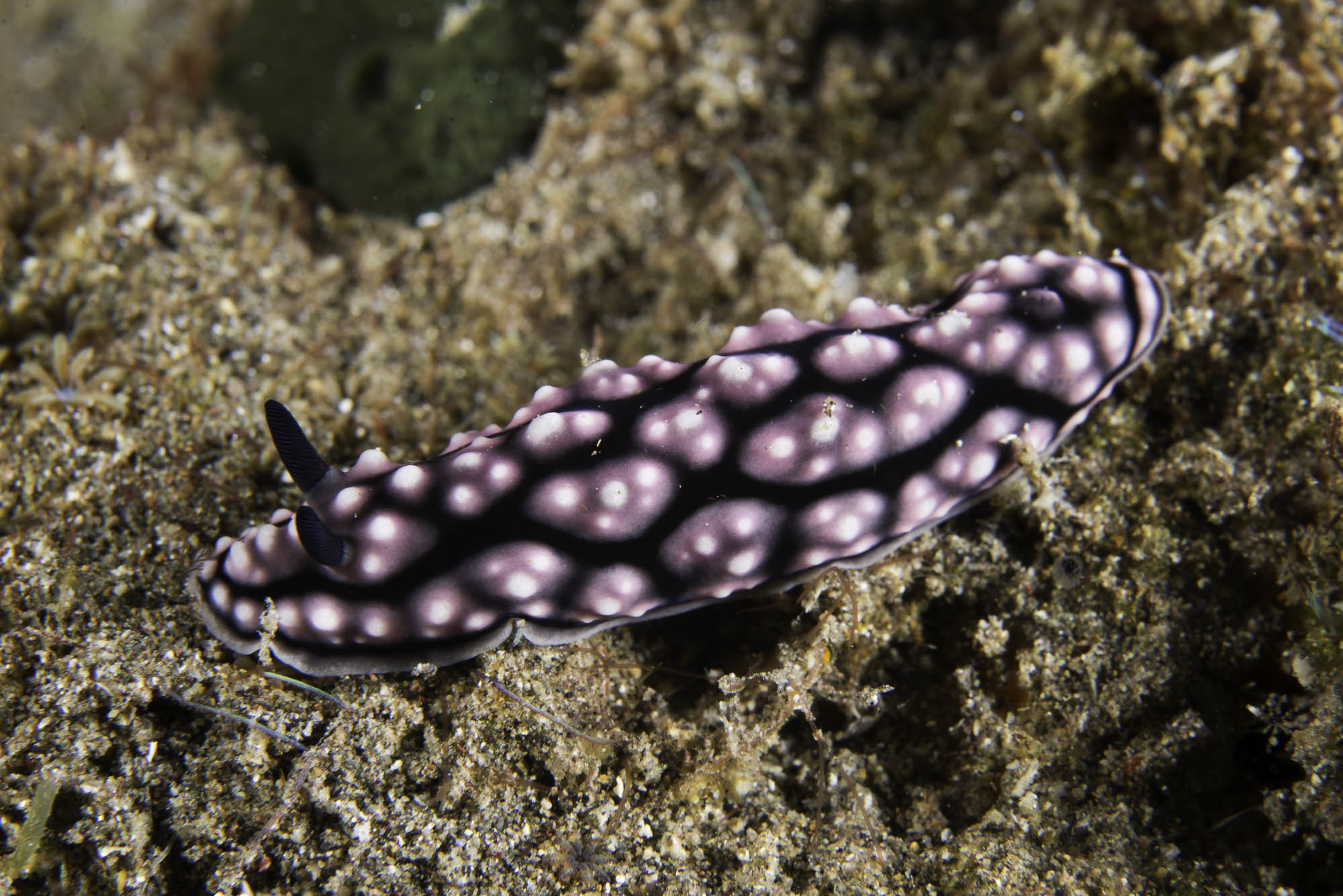
- Phyllidiella pustulosa, Lipah Bay, Amed, Bali.

Scientific classification
- Domain: Eukaryota
- Kingdom: Animalia
- Phylum: Mollusca
- Class: Gastropoda
- Order: Nudibranchia
- Superfamily: Phyllidioidea
- Family: Phyllidiidae
- Genus: Phyllidiella
- Species: P. pustulosa

Binomial name
- Phyllidiella pustulosa (Cuvier, 1804)

Synonyms
- Fryeria variabilis Collingwood, 1881; Phyllidia albonigra Quoy & Gaimard, 1832; Phyllidia melanocera Yonow, 1986; Phyllidia nobilis Bergh, 1869; Phyllidia pustulosa Cuvier, 1804 (basionym); Phyllidia rotunda Eliot, 1904; Phyllidia spectabilis Collingwood, 1881; Phyllidia verrucosa van Hasselt, 1824; Phyllidiella nobilis Bergh, 1869

= Phyllidiella pustulosa =

Species of gastropod

Phyllidiella pustulosa, the pustulose wart slug, pimpled phyllidiella, or pustulose phyllidiella, is a species of sea slug, a dorid nudibranch, in the family Phyllidiidae.

== Distribution ==
This species was described from specimens collected in Timor. It is one of the most common nudibranchs throughout the tropical Indo-West Pacific. However, a study using DNA sequencing of the CO1 gene has shown that it is a species complex.

== Description ==
Although this nudibranch changes appearance as it grows, three median clusters of (usually) pink tubercles remain the same, except that they are amalgamated in juveniles and separated in large animals. These tubercles can range in color from pink to green to white. The intensity of the pink coloration and green-grey tones may possibly be related to diet, and the length of time since last feeding. Other distinguishing features are the pale pink edge of the mantle, the broad, triangular, black tipped oral tentacles and the rhinophoral clavus possessing 22 to 26 lamellae (in specimens greater than 35 mm).

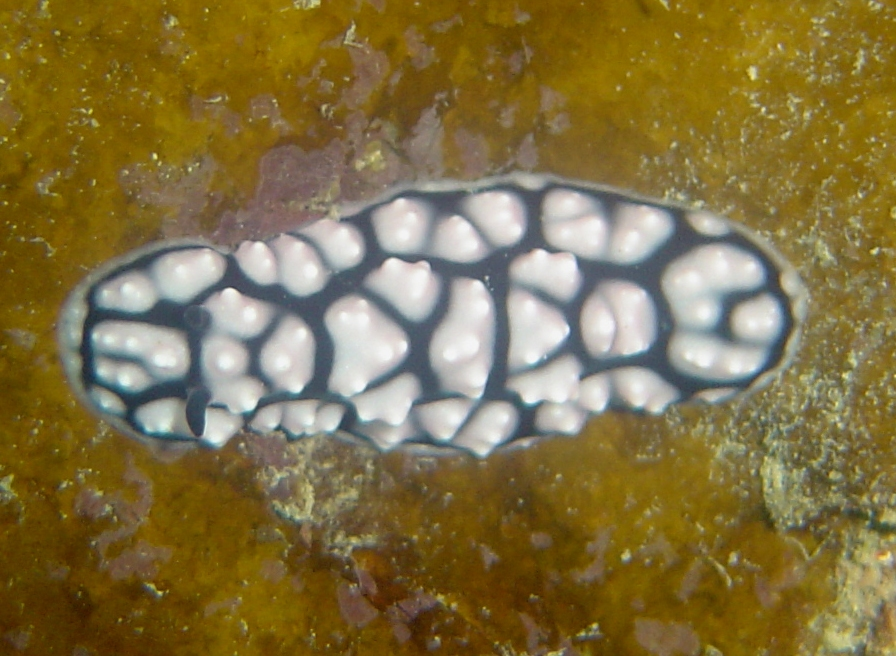
Phyllidiella cf. pustulosa, head end to the left
