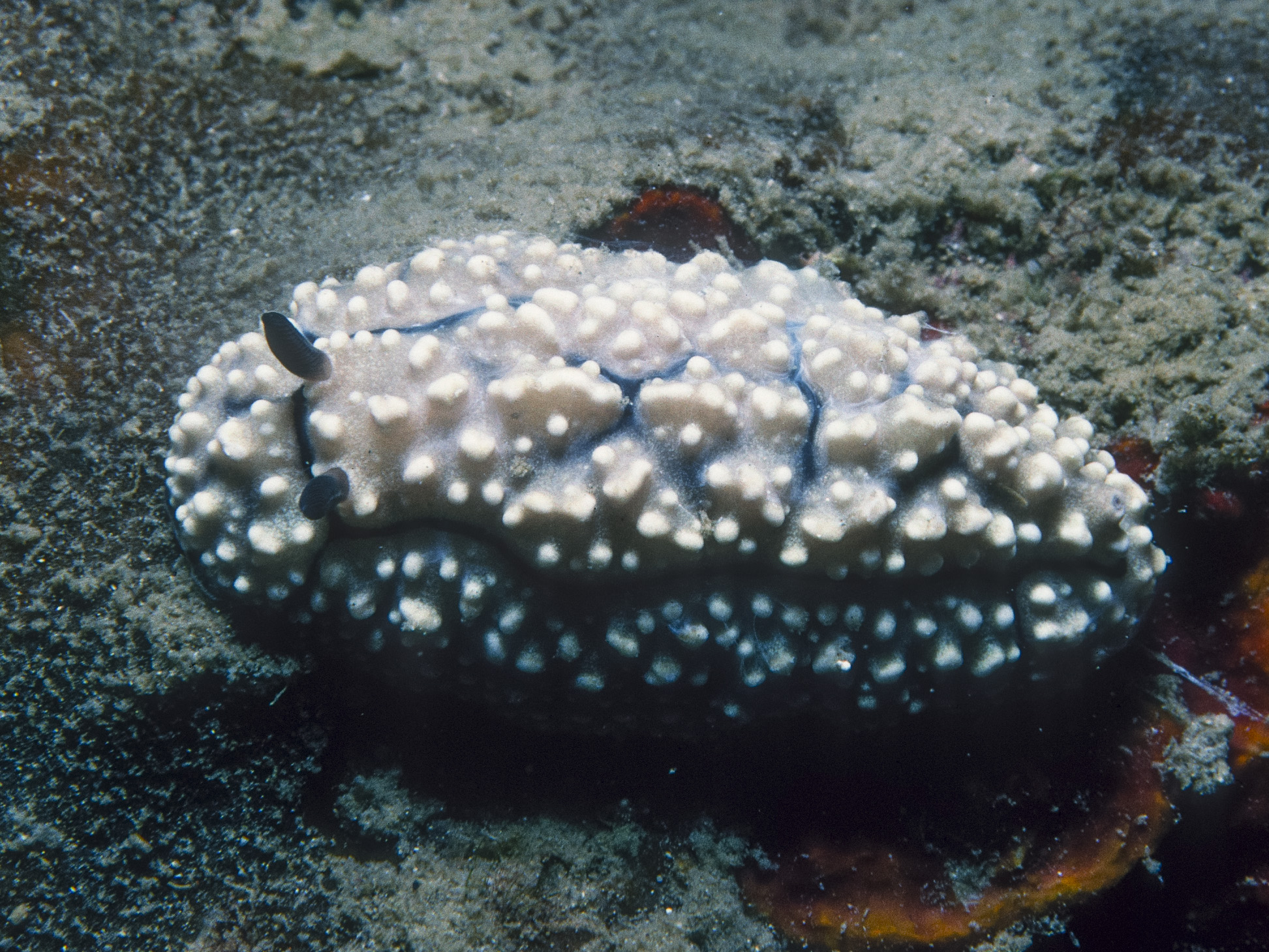
- The nudibranch Phyllidiella hageni, Pemuteran, Bali.

Scientific classification
- Kingdom: Animalia
- Phylum: Mollusca
- Class: Gastropoda
- Order: Nudibranchia
- Family: Phyllidiidae
- Genus: Phyllidiella
- Species: P. hageni

Binomial name
- Phyllidiella hageni Fahrner & Beck, 2000

= Phyllidiella hageni =

Species of gastropod

Phyllidiella hageni is a species of sea slug, a dorid nudibranch, a shell-less marine gastropod mollusk in the family Phyllidiidae.

== Distribution ==
This species was described from Lombok, Indonesia. It has been reported from Sulawesi and Papua New Guinea.

== Description ==
This nudibranch has a pink-grey dorsum with white-capped tubercles. There are thin black lines which run along the sides of the mantle, diverting at an angle to the sides of the body at the tail, without meeting. Broken black lines surround groups of tubercles in the middle of the back. There is a thin black line at the edge of the mantle. The rhinophores are black.

== Diet ==
This species feeds on sponges.
