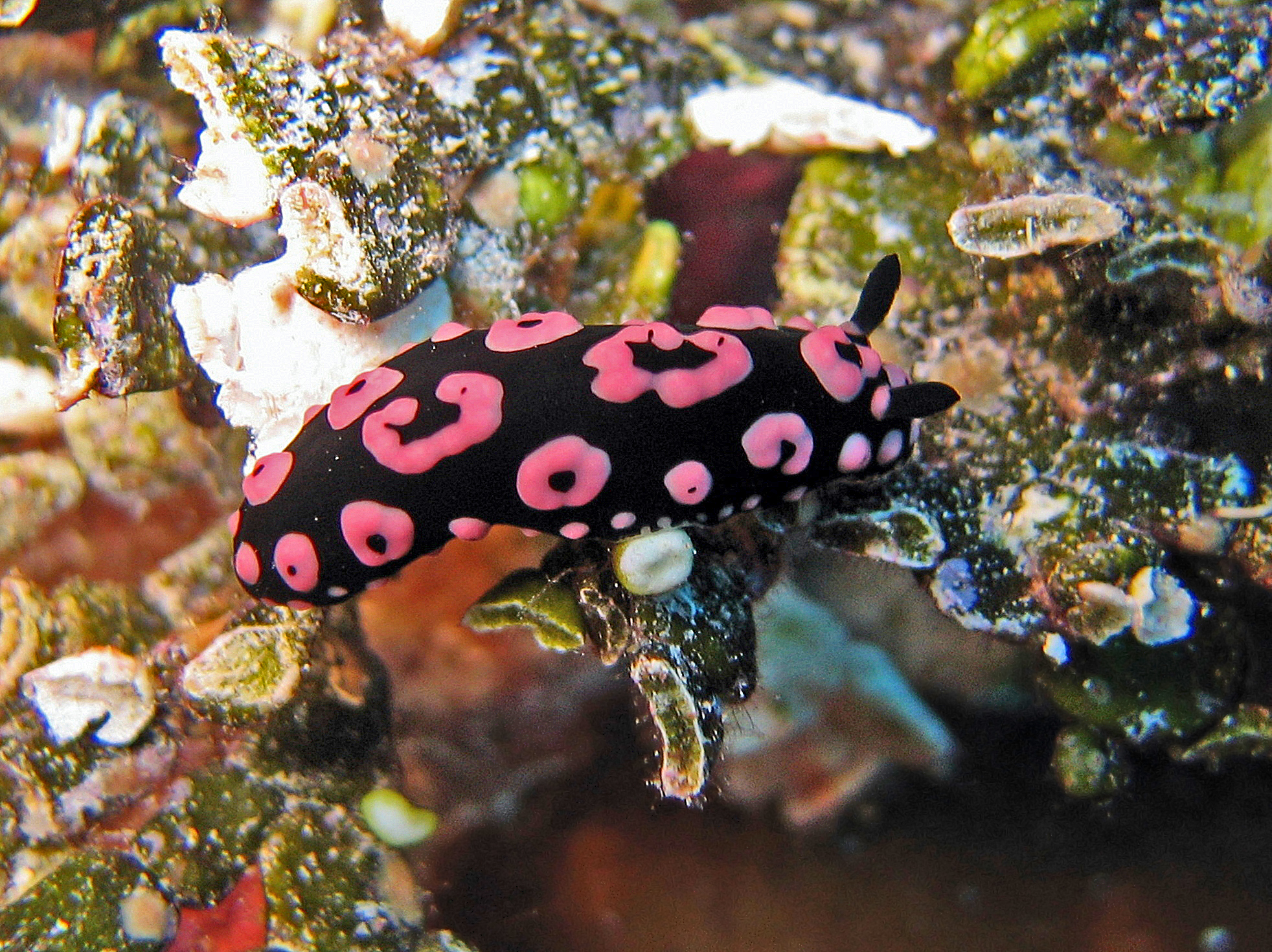
- A live individual of Phyllidiella annulata in situ in Polynesia, head end towards the right

Scientific classification
- Kingdom: Animalia
- Phylum: Mollusca
- Class: Gastropoda
- Order: Nudibranchia
- Superfamily: Phyllidioidea
- Family: Phyllidiidae
- Genus: Phyllidiella
- Species: P. annulata

Binomial name
- Phyllidiella annulata (Gray, 1853)

= Phyllidiella annulata =

Species of gastropod

Phyllidiella annulata is a species of sea slug, a dorid nudibranch, a shell-less marine gastropod mollusk in the family Phyllidiidae.

== Description ==
Phyllidiella annulata can reach a length of 30–37 mm. It shows a distinctive dorsal pattern usually consisting of a black background with various rings of small bright pink tubercles with black spots in the centre. This species lacks compound tubercles, tubercular clusters and ridges of tubercles.

== Habitat ==
It occurs on shallow coral reefs and rubble, at a depth of about 15 m.

== Distribution ==
This species was described from Lord Hood's Island, Pacific Ocean. It has been reported from the Red Sea, in the tropical Indian Ocean and in central-western Pacific Ocean.

== Bibliography ==
- Gary R. McDonald, University of California Santa Cruz - Nudibranch Systematic Index
- Brunckhorst, D.J. (1993) The systematics and phylogeny of Phyllidiid Nudibranchs (Doridoidea). Records of the Australian Museum, Supplement 16: 1-107.
