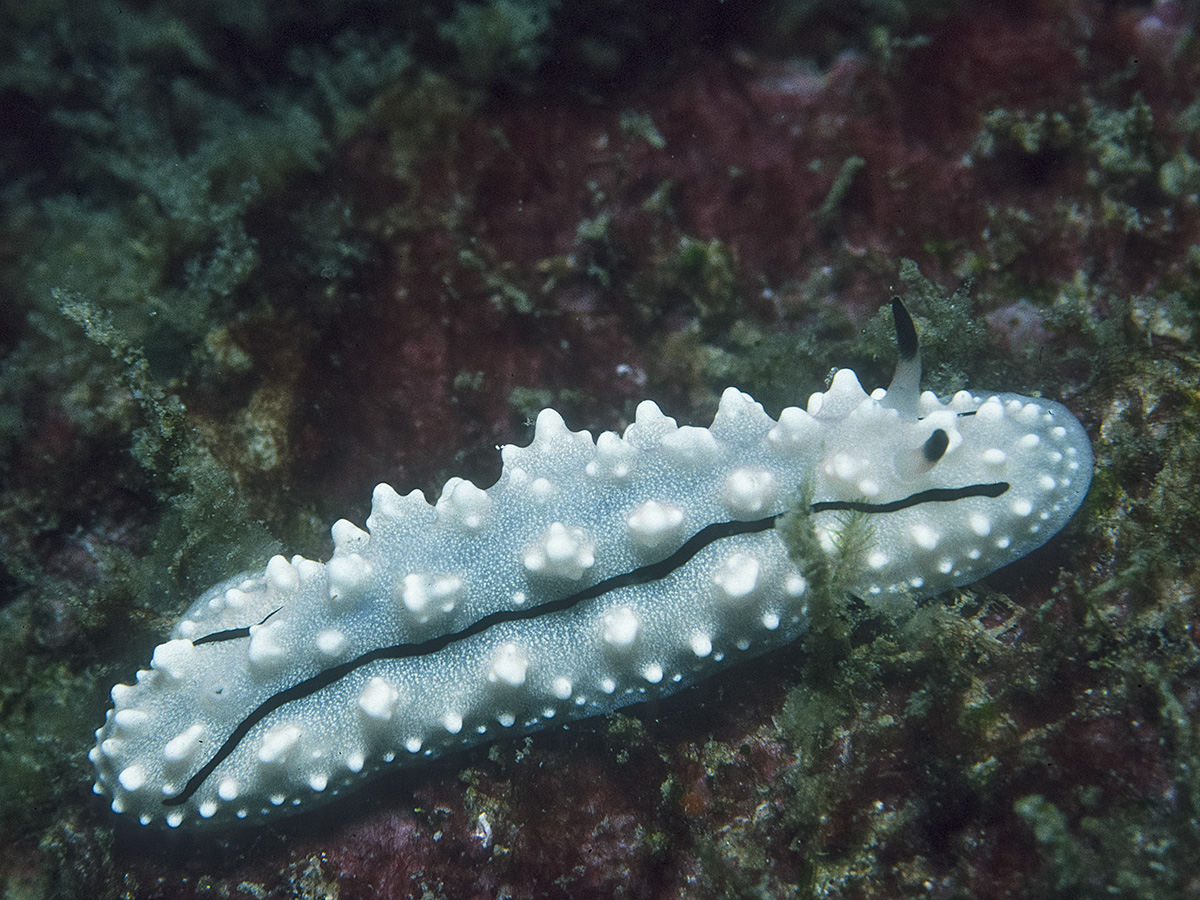
- Phyllidiella rudmani, Pemuteran, Bali

Scientific classification
- Kingdom: Animalia
- Phylum: Mollusca
- Class: Gastropoda
- Order: Nudibranchia
- Family: Phyllidiidae
- Genus: Phyllidiella
- Species: P. rudmani

Binomial name
- Phyllidiella rudmani Brunckhorst, 1993

= Phyllidiella rudmani =

Species of gastropod

Phyllidiella rudmani is a species of sea slug, a dorid nudibranch, a shell-less marine gastropod mollusk in the family Phyllidiidae.

== Distribution ==
This species was described from Papua New Guinea with additional specimens from Fiji, Solomon Islands, Taiwan, Thailand and the Great Barrier Reef, Queensland. It has been reported from the Maldives and Sulawesi.

== Description ==
This nudibranch has a pale pink dorsum with white-capped tubercles. There are two narrow black lines which run in a straight line between the tubercles, joining at the tail. The rhinophores are black with a pink base.

== Diet ==
This species feeds on the sponge Phakellia sp.
