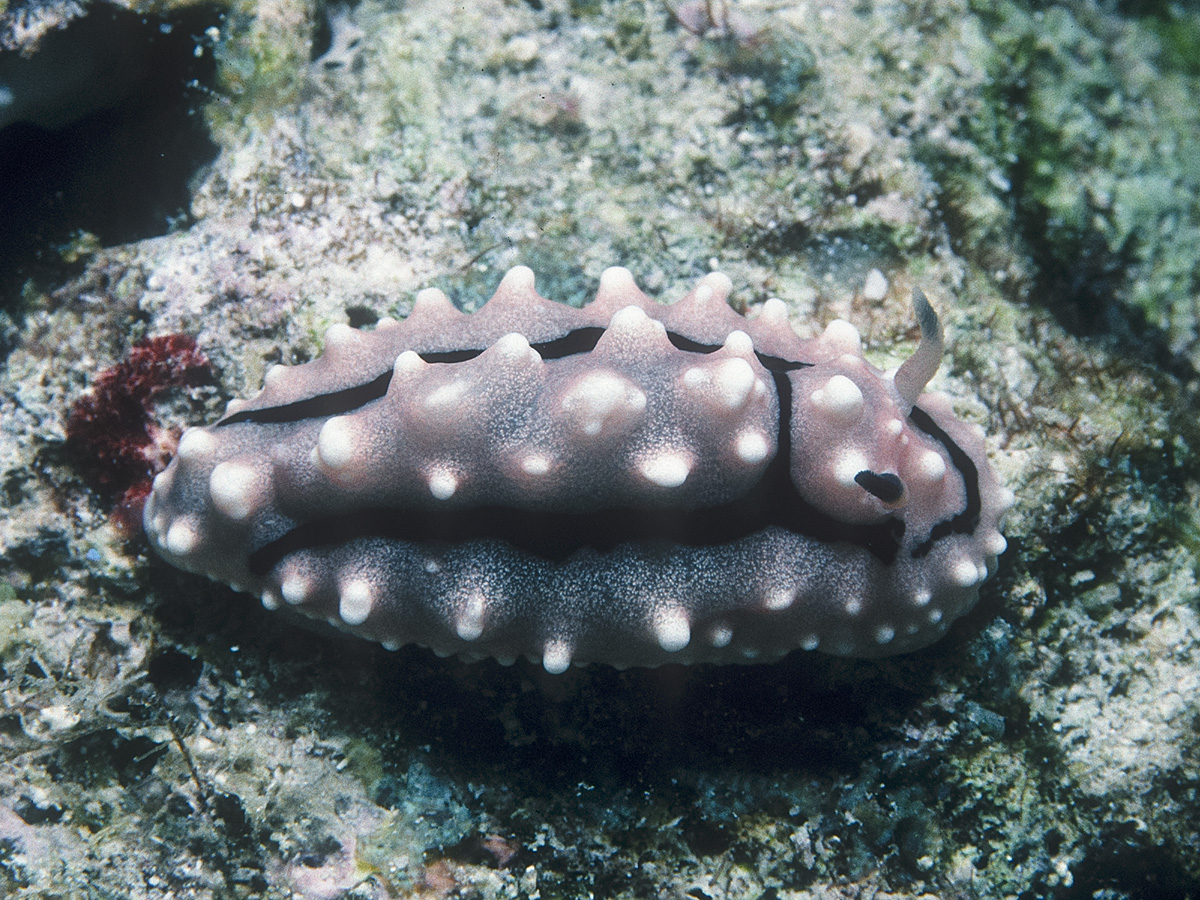
- Phyllidiella granulata, Pemuteran, Bali.

Scientific classification
- Kingdom: Animalia
- Phylum: Mollusca
- Class: Gastropoda
- Order: Nudibranchia
- Family: Phyllidiidae
- Genus: Phyllidiella
- Species: P. granulata

Binomial name
- Phyllidiella granulata Brunckhorst, 1993

= Phyllidiella granulata =

Species of gastropod

Phyllidiella granulata is a species of sea slug, a dorid nudibranch, a shell-less marine gastropod mollusk in the family Phyllidiidae.

== Distribution ==
This species was described from Guam with an additional specimen from Lizard Island, Australia. It has been reported from the Philippines, Papua New Guinea and Sipadan Island.

== Description ==
This nudibranch has a grey dorsum with white-capped tubercles with pink or grey bases. There are two longitudinal black lines which run in a zigzag pattern between the tubercle groups, joining at the tail. Connecting black lines may run across the body. The rhinophores are black with a pale grey base.

== Diet ==
This species has been reported to feed on the sponge Acanthella cavernosa.
