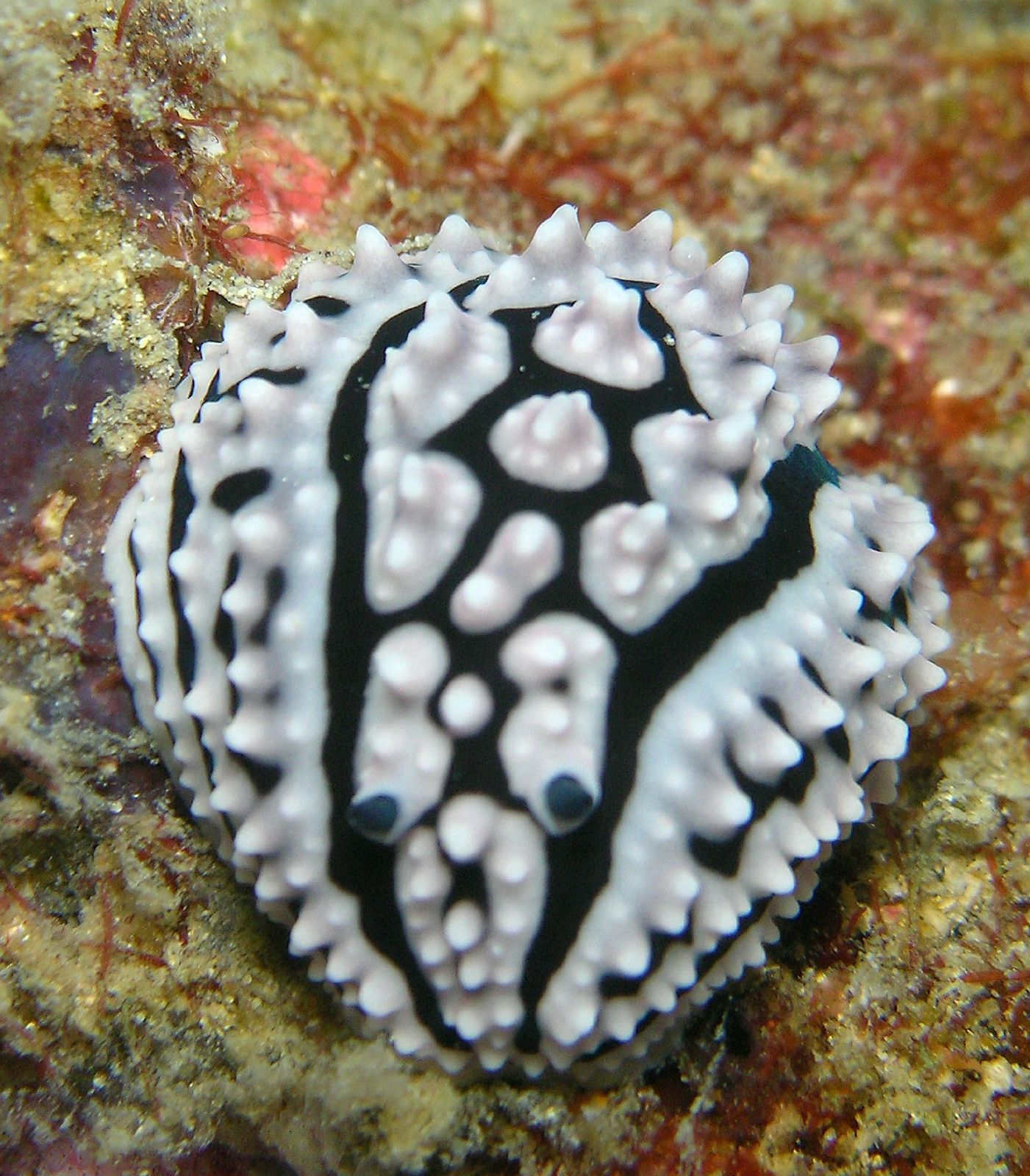
- A view of a live Phyllidiella zeylanica, head end towards the front

Scientific classification
- Kingdom: Animalia
- Phylum: Mollusca
- Class: Gastropoda
- Order: Nudibranchia
- Infraorder: Doridoidei
- Superfamily: Phyllidioidea
- Family: Phyllidiidae
- Genus: Phyllidiella; Bergh, 1869

Type species
- Phyllidia pustulosa Cuvier, 1804

= Phyllidiella =

Genus of gastropods

Phyllidiella is a genus of sea slugs, dorid nudibranchs, shell-less marine gastropod molluscs in the family Phyllidiidae.

== Species ==
Species in the genus Phyllidiella include:

- Phyllidiella amphitrite Yonow, 2020
- Phyllidiella annulata (Gray, 1853)
- Phyllidiella backeljaui Dominguez, Quintas & Troncoso, 2007
- Phyllidiella cooraburrama Brunckhorst, 1993
- Phyllidiella granulata Brunckhorst, 1993
- Phyllidiella hageni Fahrner & Beck, 2000
- Phyllidiella lizae Brunckhorst, 1993
- Phyllidiella meandrina (Pruvot-Fol, 1957)
- Phyllidiella molaensis (Meyer, 1977)
- Phyllidiella nigra (van Hasselt, 1824)
- Phyllidiella pustulosa (Cuvier, 1804)
- Phyllidiella rosans (Bergh, 1873)
- Phyllidiella rudmani Brunckhorst, 1993
- Phyllidiella striata (Bergh, 1889)
- Phyllidiella zeylanica (Kelaart, 1859)

Species brought into synonymy

- Phyllidiella nobilis (Bergh, 1869): synonym of Phyllidiella pustulosa (Cuvier, 1804) - type species of Phyllidiella.
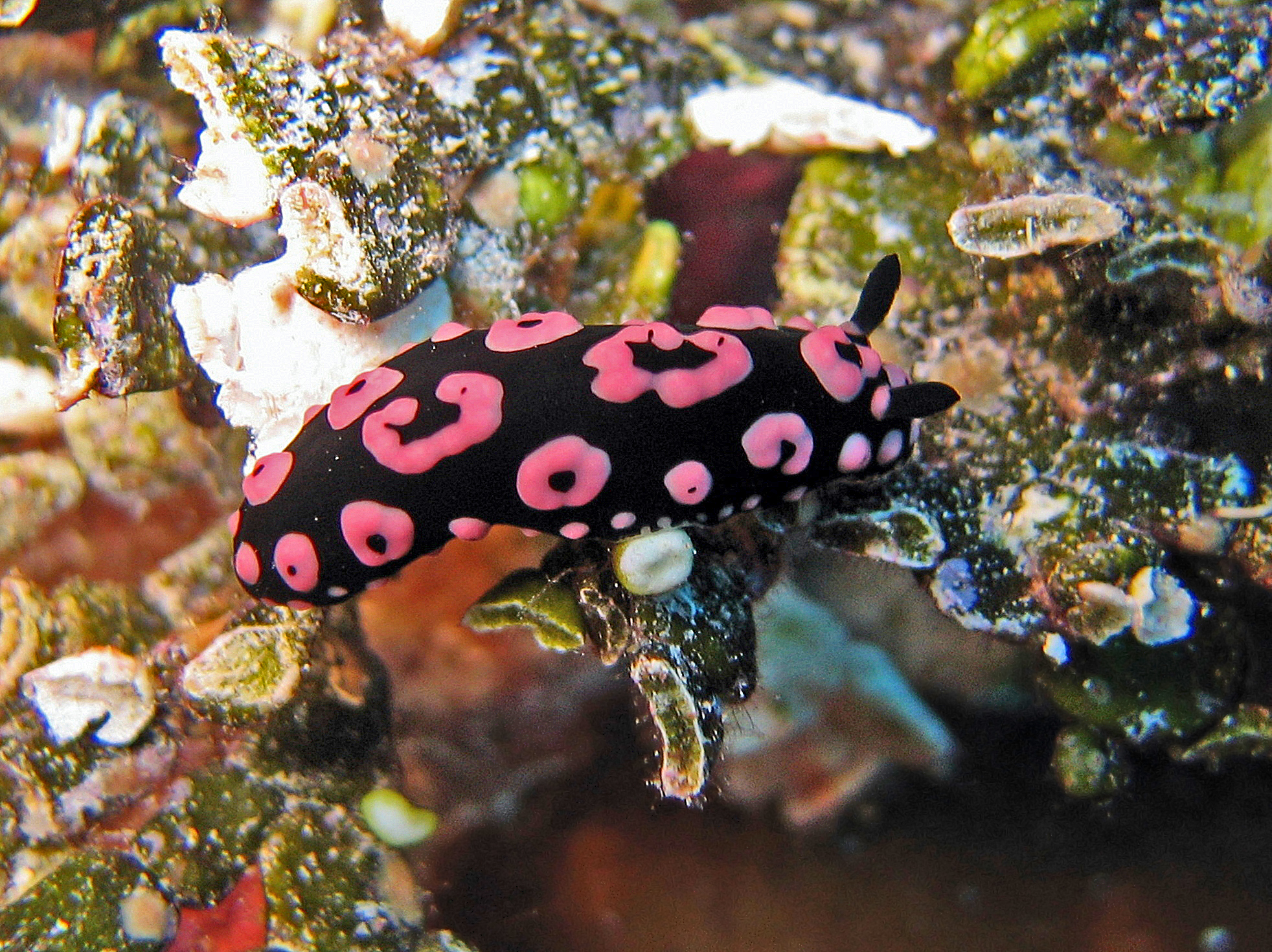
Phyllidiella annulata

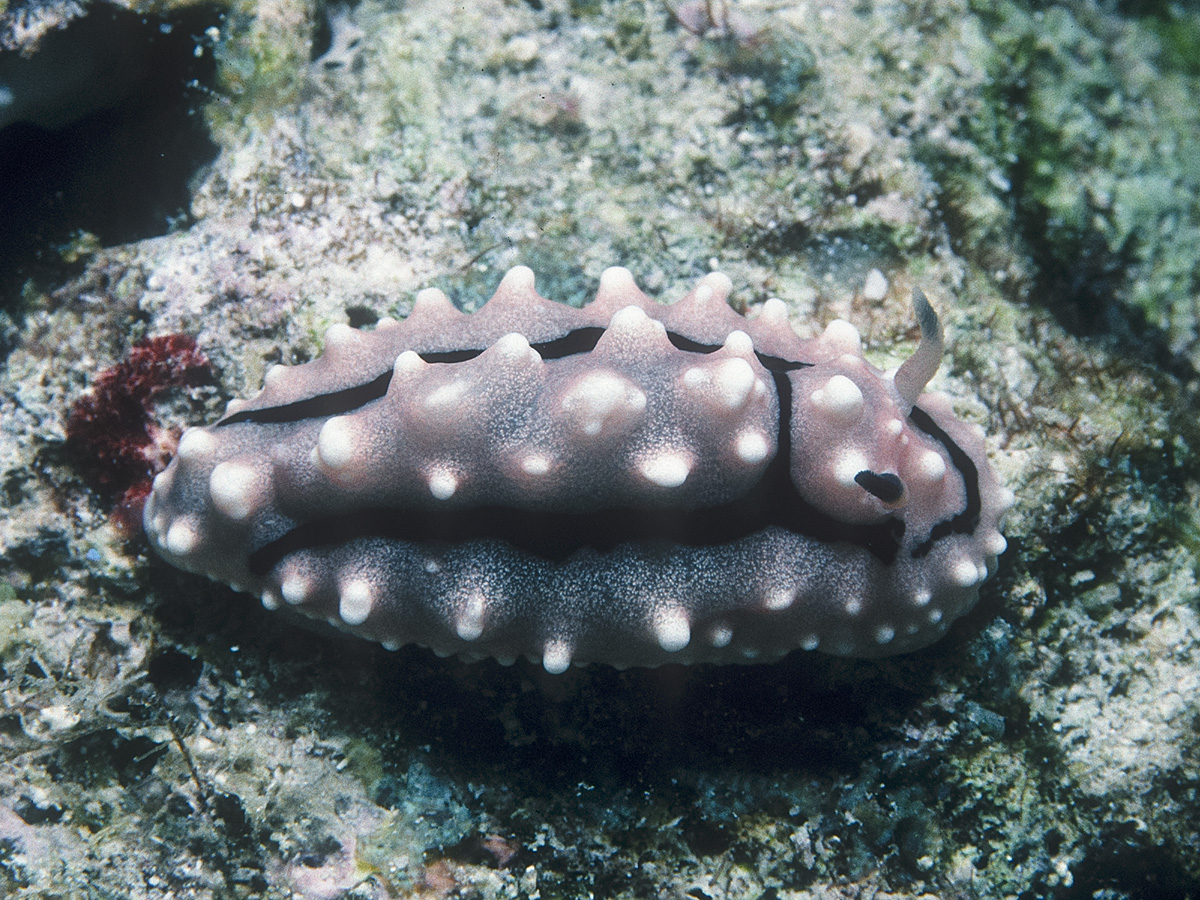
Phyllidiella granulata

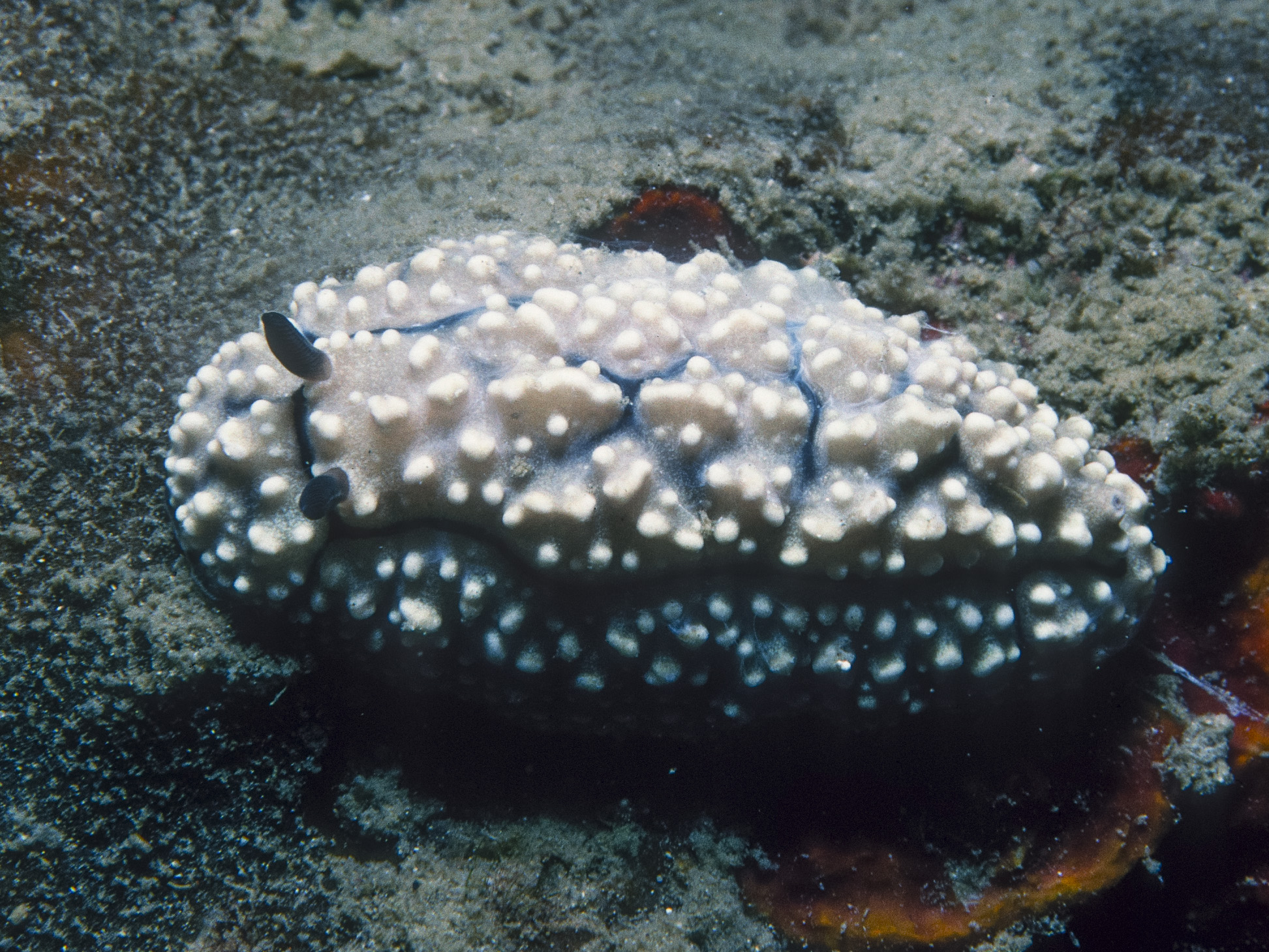
Phyllidiella hageni

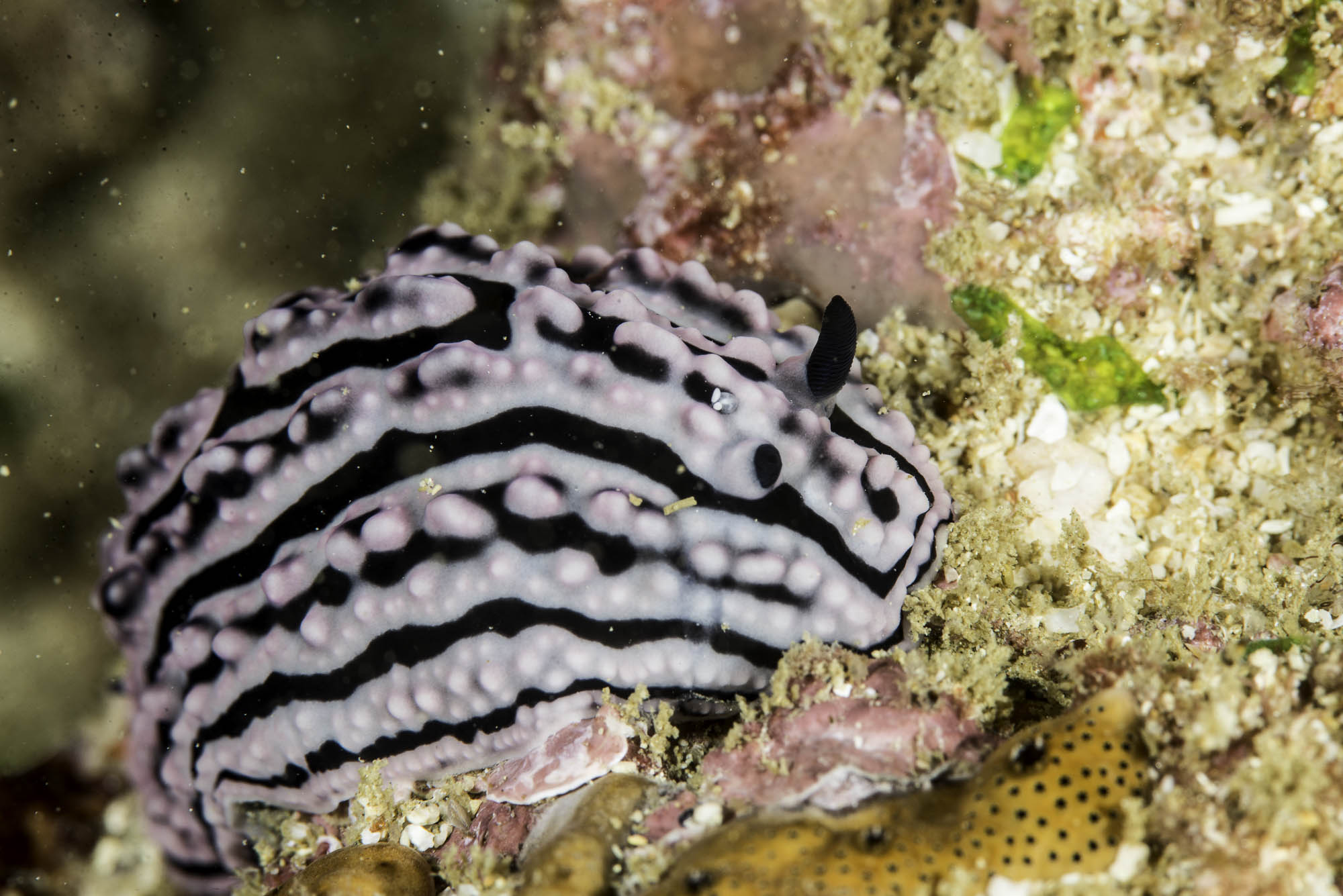
Phyllidiella meandrina

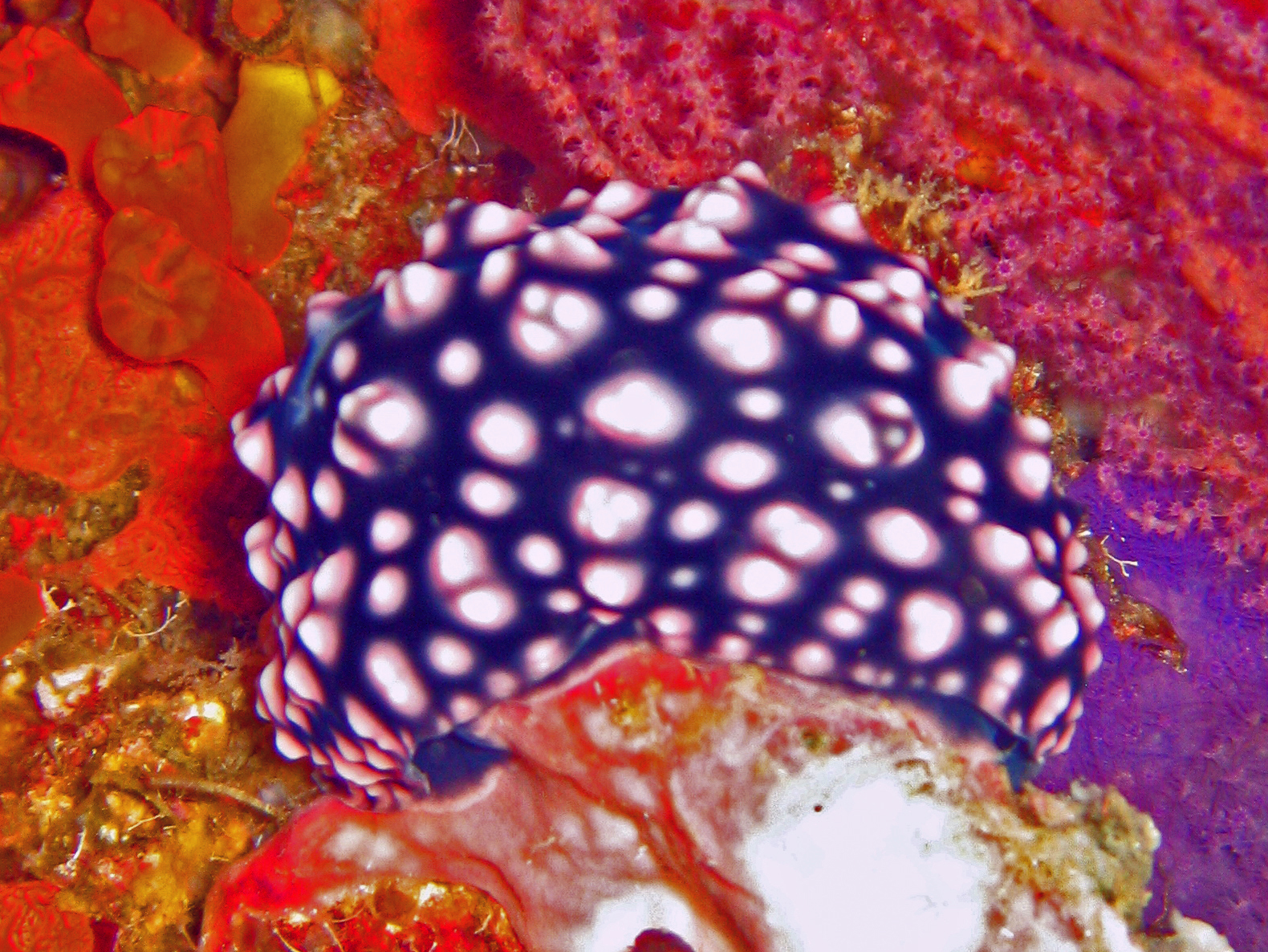
Phyllidiella nigra

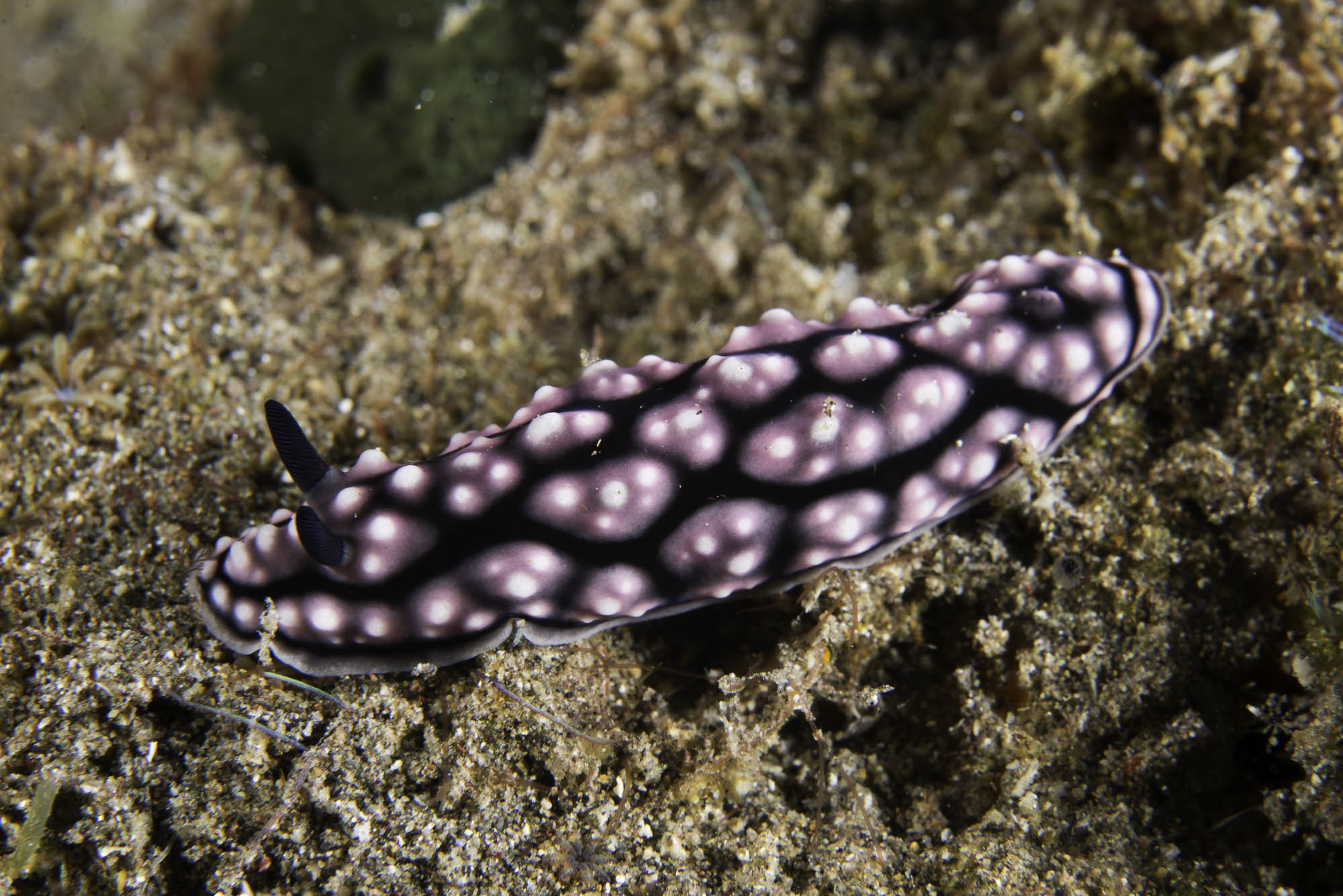
Phyllidiella pustulosa

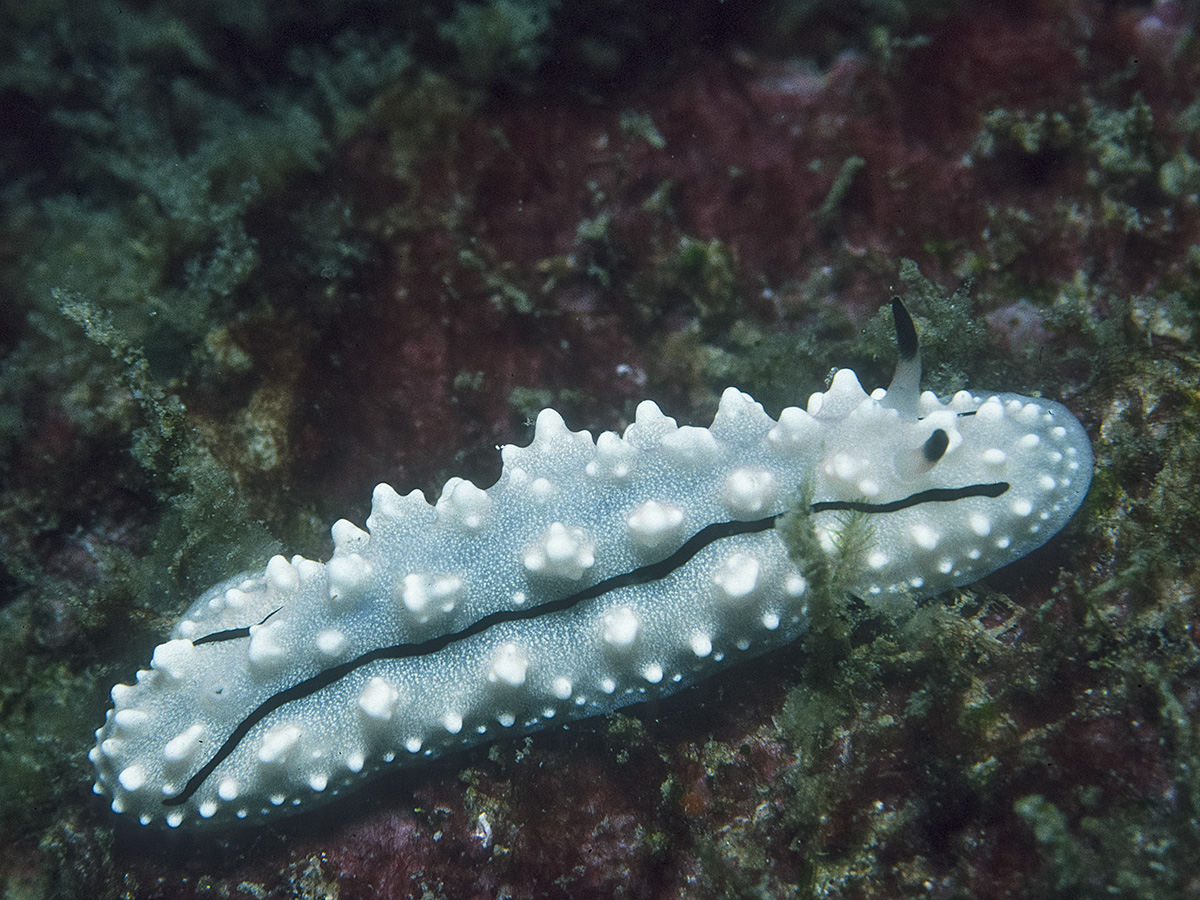
Phyllidiella rudmani

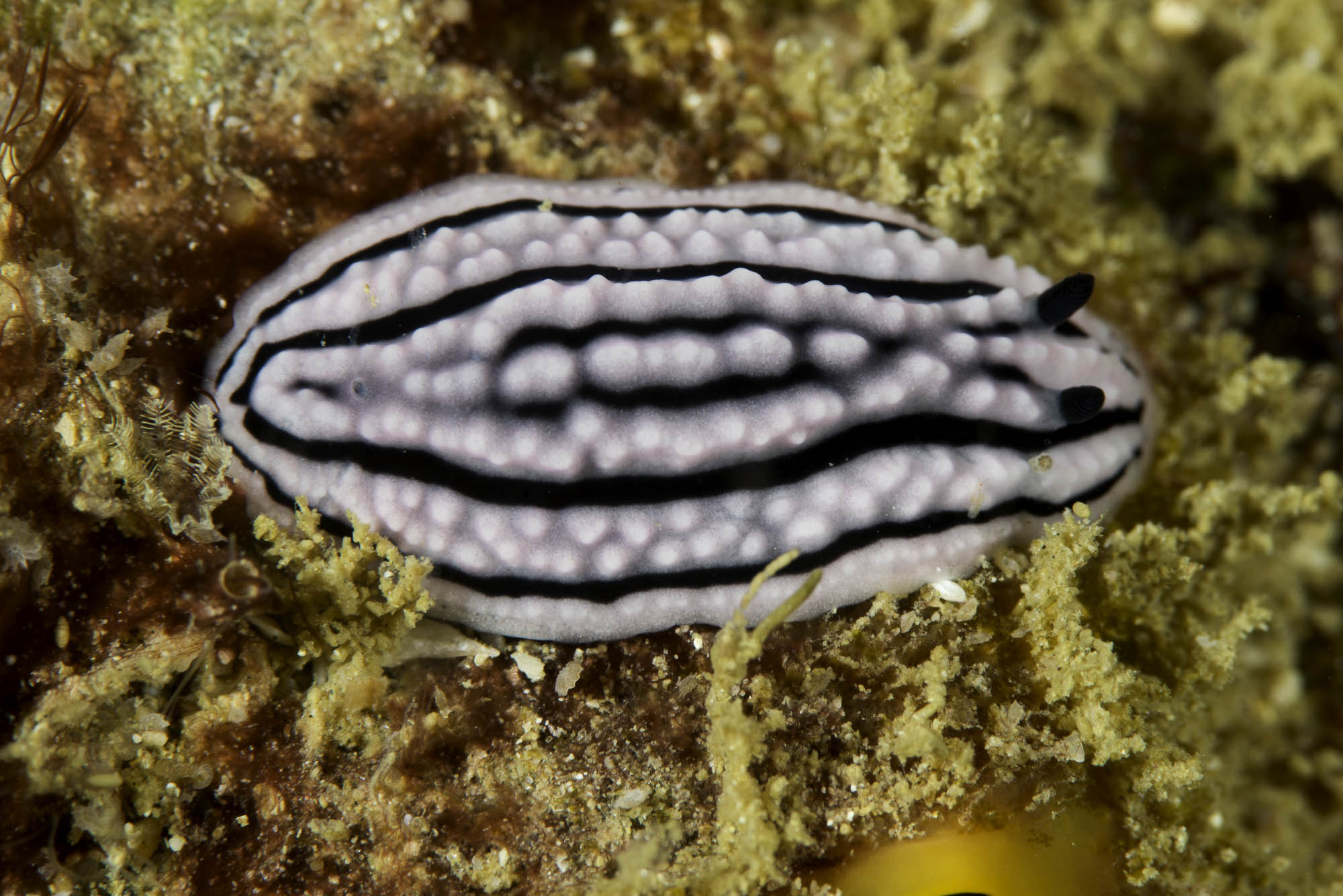
Phyllidiella zeylanica
