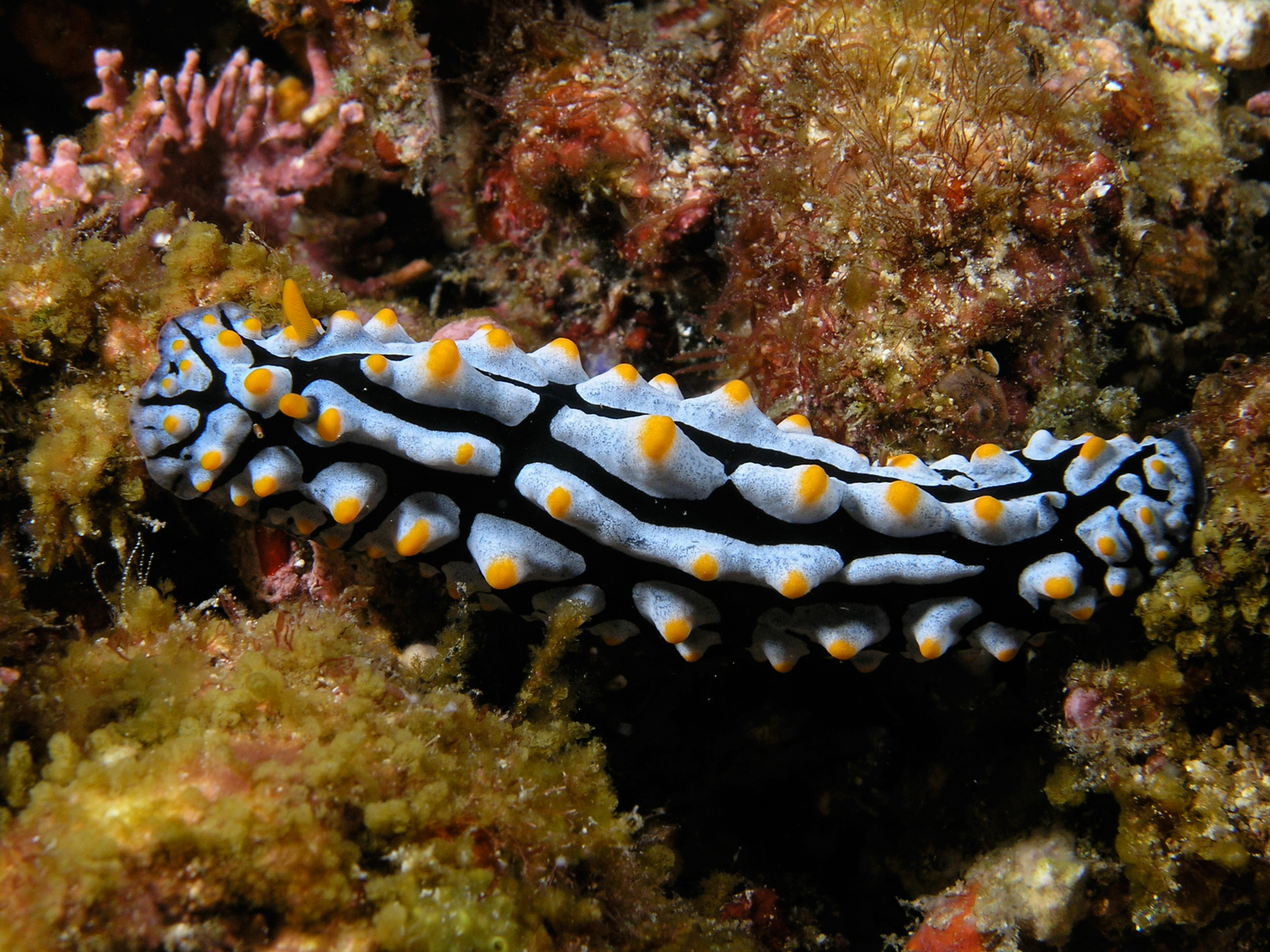
- A live individual of Phyllidia varicosa, head end towards the left

Scientific classification
- Domain: Eukaryota
- Kingdom: Animalia
- Phylum: Mollusca
- Class: Gastropoda
- Order: Nudibranchia
- Superfamily: Phyllidioidea
- Family: Phyllidiidae
- Genus: Phyllidia
- Species: P. varicosa

Binomial name
- Phyllidia varicosa (Lamarck, 1801)

= Phyllidia varicosa =

Species of mollusc

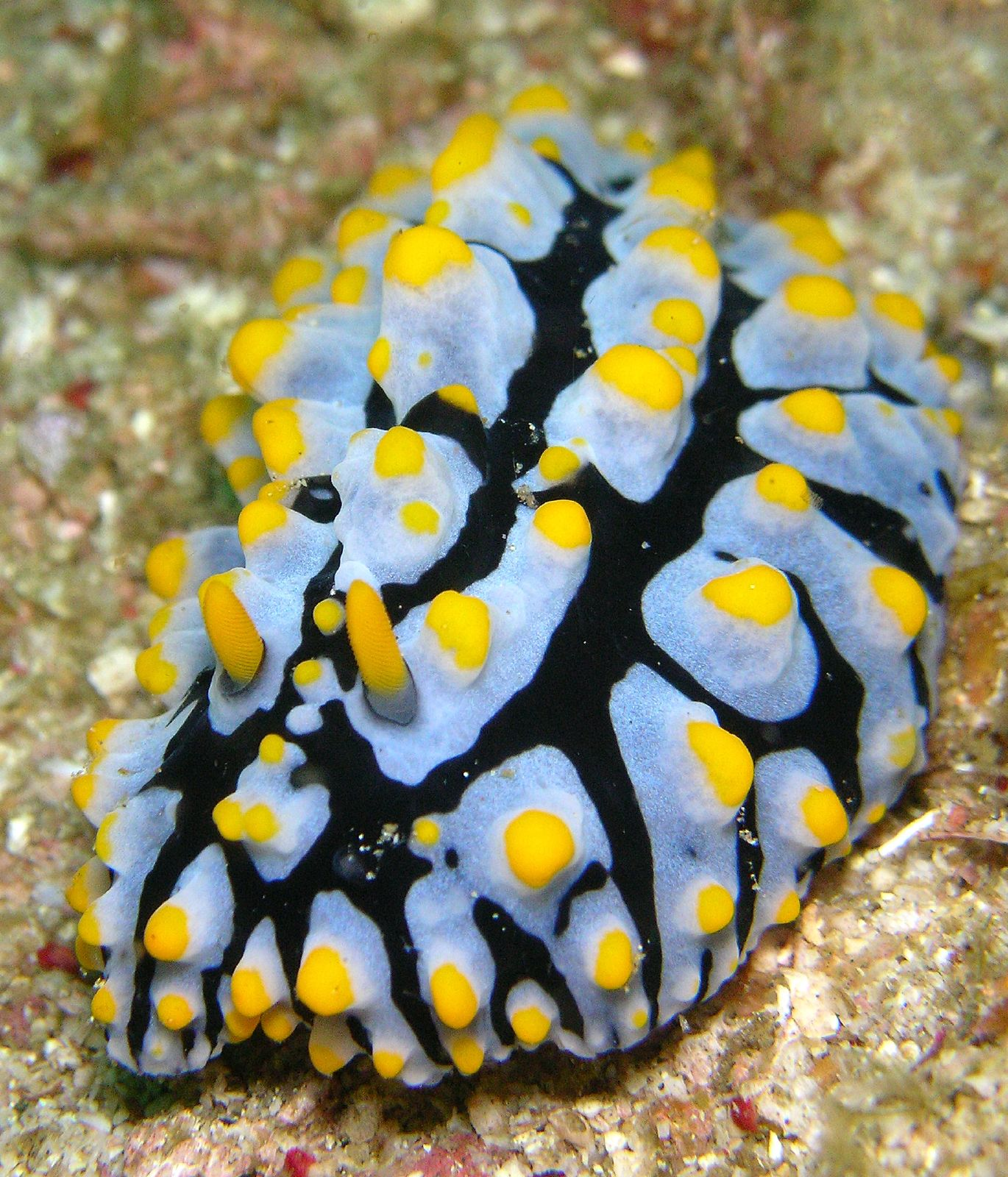
Phyllidia varicosa, a view from the head end

Phyllidia varicosa is a species of sea slug, a dorid nudibranch, a shell-less marine gastropod mollusc in the family Phyllidiidae.

== Distribution ==
This species is widely distributed throughout the Indo-West Pacific Oceans including the central Pacific and the Red Sea.

== Description ==
This is a large species growing to at least 115 mm. It can be distinguished by its numerous (3 to 6), longitudinal, tuberculate notal ridges. The ridge and bases of the tubercles are a blue-grey colour. The tubercles are capped in yellow. The foot sole has a black longitudinal foot stripe. The rhinophoral clavus possesses 27 to 30 lamellae.

== Mimicry ==
Juveniles of the sea cucumber, Pearsonothuria graeffei are brightly coloured and closely resemble Phyllidia varicosa. They are white and blue or black, with a few large, yellow, thornlike projections. These bright colours warn predators of the toxicity of the nudibranch, and this mimicry on the part of the sea cucumber species serves to protect it also. The adult sea cucumber has much duller colouration, but it is also much larger than the sea slug and has its own toxic chemicals at this stage.
