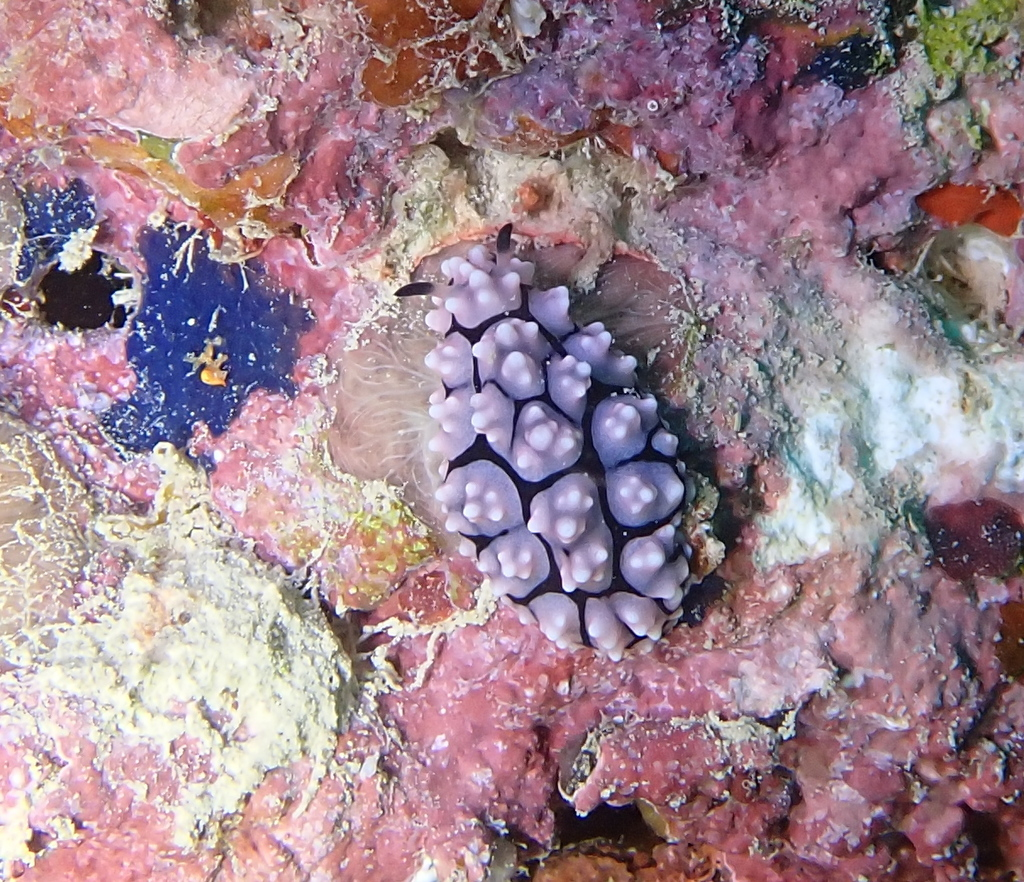

Scientific classification
- Kingdom: Animalia
- Phylum: Mollusca
- Class: Gastropoda
- Order: Nudibranchia
- Family: Phyllidiidae
- Genus: Phyllidiella
- Species: P. cooraburrama

Binomial name
- Phyllidiella cooraburrama Brunckhorst, 1993

= Phyllidiella cooraburrama =

Species of gastropod

Phyllidiella cooraburrama is a species of sea slug, a dorid nudibranch, a shell-less marine gastropod mollusk in the family Phyllidiidae.

== Distribution ==
This species was described from Bare Islet 19.2577°S 147.0720°E, Townsville, Australia. It has been reported from Pohnpei, Fiji and Bali.

== Description ==
This nudibranch has a black dorsum with tall white-capped tubercles with pink or grey bases. These tubercles are in groups of 2-4 on the middle of the back, with smaller, single tubercles towards the edge of the mantle. The rhinophores are black.

== Diet ==
This species feeds on a sponge.
