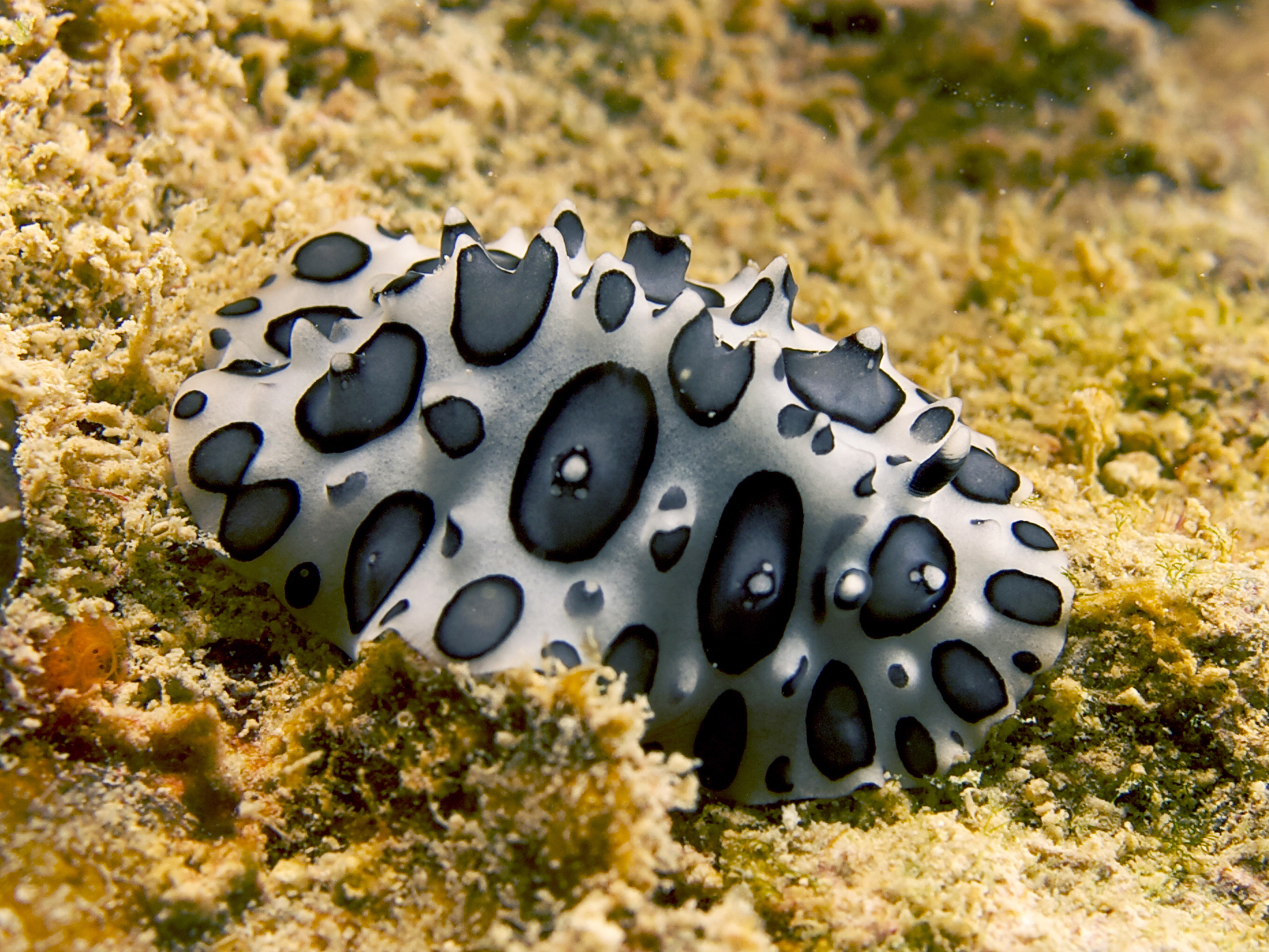
- Ceratophyllidia papilligera

Scientific classification
- Kingdom: Animalia
- Phylum: Mollusca
- Class: Gastropoda
- Order: Nudibranchia
- Family: Phyllidiidae
- Genus: Ceratophyllidia; Eliot, 1903

Type species
- Ceratophyllidia africana Eliot, 1903

= Ceratophyllidia =

Genus of gastropods

Ceratophyllidia is a genus of sea slugs, dorid nudibranchs, shell-less marine gastropod molluscs in the family Phyllidiidae.

They are known for their unusually soft, spherical and stalked tubercules on their upper dorsa. Unlike the species of Phyllidia, they lack oral glands or the glands are free from the oral tube.

== Species ==
Species in the genus Ceratophyllidia include:

- Ceratophyllidia africana Eliot, 1903
- Ceratophyllidia papilligera (Bergh, 1890)

Species brought into synonymy

- Ceratophyllidia grisea Eliot, 1910: synonym of Ceratophyllidia africana Eliot, 1903
- Ceratophyllidia molaensis (Meyer, 1977): synonym of Phyllidiella molaensis (Meyer, 1977)
