= Phyllidiella lizae =

Scientific classification
- Kingdom: Animalia
- Phylum: Mollusca
- Class: Gastropoda
- Order: Nudibranchia
- Family: Phyllidiidae
- Genus: Phyllidiella
- Species: P. lizae

Binomial name
- Phyllidiella lizae Brunckhorst, 1993

Species of gastropod

Phyllidiella lizae is a species of sea slug, a dorid nudibranch, a shell-less marine gastropod mollusk in the family Phyllidiidae.

== Distribution ==
This species was described from Heron Island, Australia with additional specimens from Fiji, New Caledonia, Papua New Guinea and Cape Moreton, Queensland. It has been reported from Vanuatu and Sulawesi.

== Description ==
This nudibranch has a pale pink dorsum with white-capped tubercles. There are narrow black lines which run in a zigzag pattern between the tubercle groups, joining at the tail. Connecting black lines run across the body and down the sides. The rhinophores are black with a pale grey base.

== Diet ==
This species feeds on sponges.
