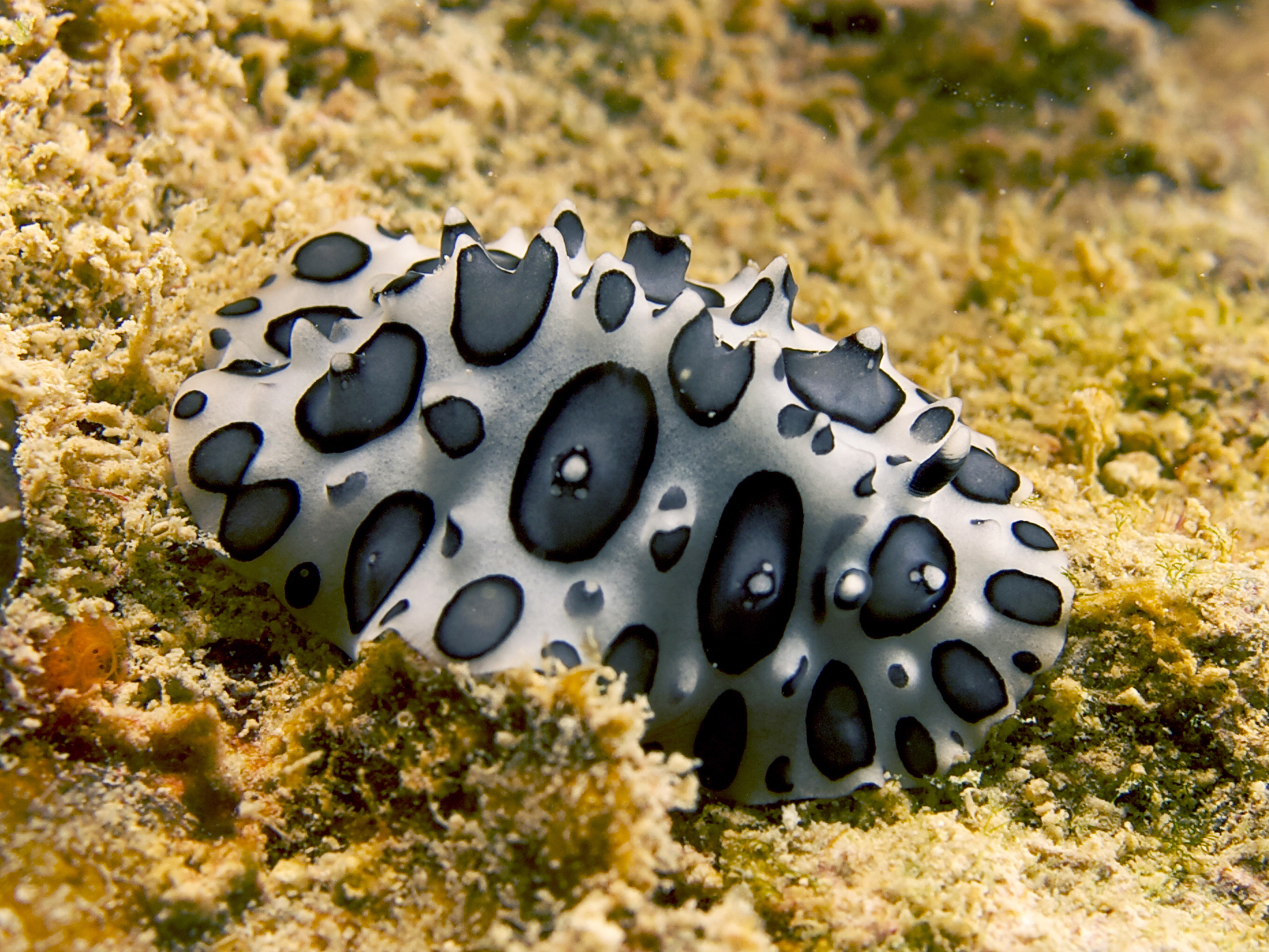
- Ceratophyllidia papilligera, head is on the right

Scientific classification
- Kingdom: Animalia
- Phylum: Mollusca
- Class: Gastropoda
- Order: Nudibranchia
- Family: Phyllidiidae
- Genus: Ceratophyllidia
- Species: C. papilligera

Binomial name
- Ceratophyllidia papilligera (Bergh, 1890)

Synonyms
- Phyllidiopsis papilligera Bergh, 1890

= Ceratophyllidia papilligera =

Species of gastropod

Ceratophyllidia papilligera, or the black-spotted nudibranch, is a species of sea slug, dorid nudibranch, shell-less marine gastropod mollusc in the family Phyllidiidae.

== Description ==
The maximum recorded body length is 30 mm.

== Habitat ==
Minimum recorded depth is 2 m. Maximum recorded depth is 185 m.
