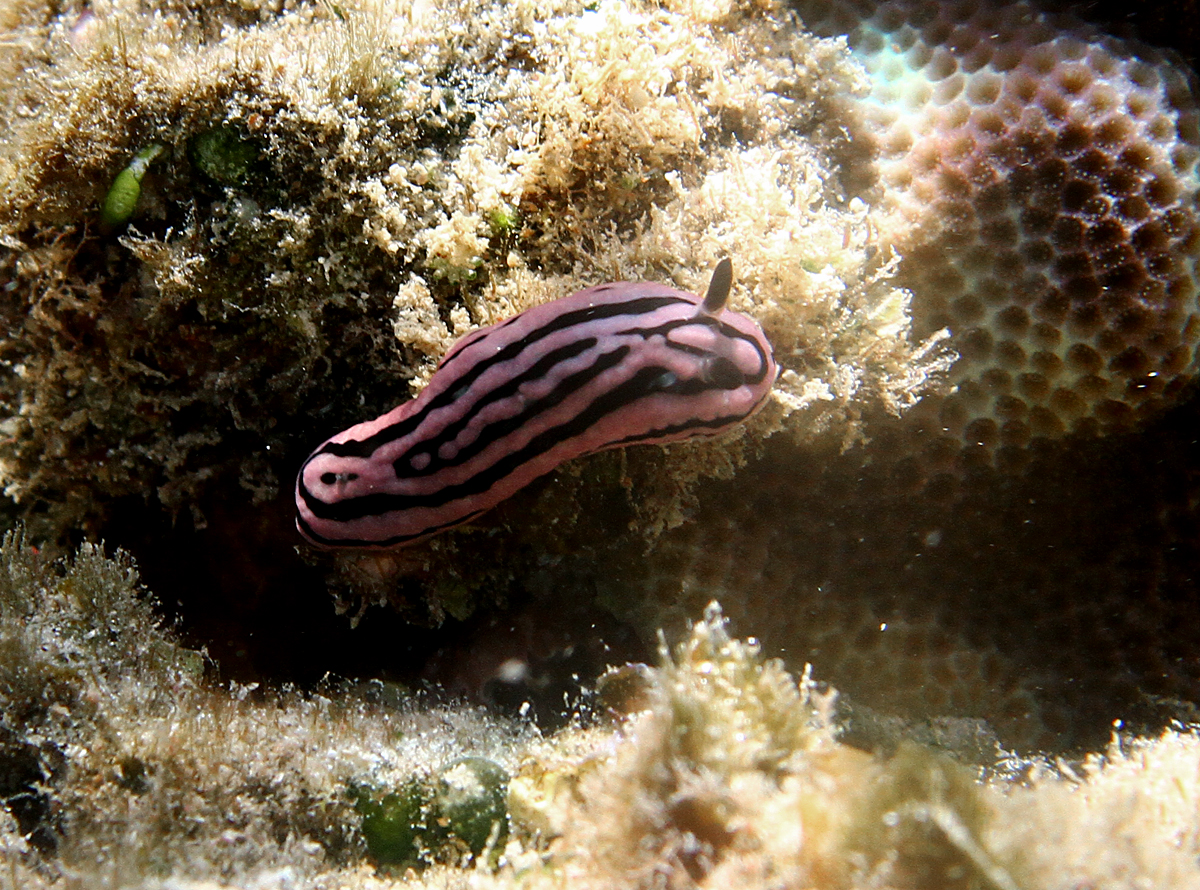

Scientific classification
- Kingdom: Animalia
- Phylum: Mollusca
- Class: Gastropoda
- Order: Nudibranchia
- Family: Phyllidiidae
- Genus: Phyllidiella
- Species: P. rosans

Binomial name
- Phyllidiella rosans (Bergh, 1873)

= Phyllidiella rosans =

Species of gastropod

Phyllidiella rosans is a species of sea slug, a dorid nudibranch, a shell-less marine gastropod mollusk in the family Phyllidiidae.

== Distribution ==
This species was collected in Tahiti by Andrew Garrett and sent to both William Harper Pease and Rudolph Bergh. Pease described it in 1868 as Phyllidia nigra but this name was preoccupied by Phyllidia nigra van Hasselt, 1824. Bergh described it as Phyllidia rosans in 1873. It has been reported from Hawaii and Fiji. Reports of this species from the Maldives, Tanzania and other Indian Ocean localities may be a distinct species.

== Description ==
This nudibranch has a black dorsum with longitudinal pink ridges. The rhinophores are black.

== Diet ==
This species feeds on a yellow sponge.
