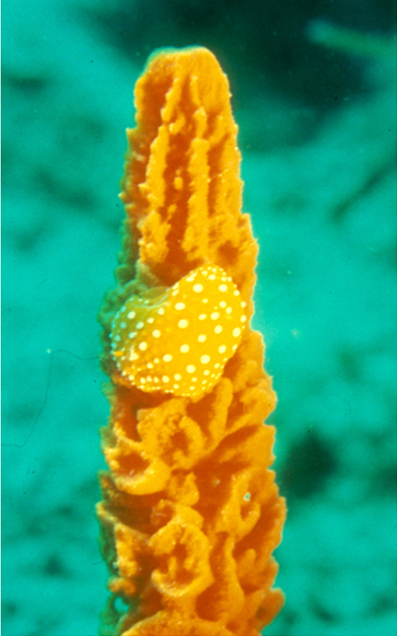
- Phyllidia flava

Scientific classification
- Domain: Eukaryota
- Kingdom: Animalia
- Phylum: Mollusca
- Class: Gastropoda
- Order: Nudibranchia
- Infraorder: Doridoidei
- Superfamily: Phyllidioidea; Rafinesque, 1814

Families
- See text

= Phyllidioidea =

Superfamily of gastropods

Phyllidioidea is a taxonomic superfamily of colorful sea slugs, dorid nudibranchs, marine gastropod mollusks.

== Taxonomy ==
- Family Phyllidiidae Rafinesque, 1814
- Family Dendrodorididae O'Donoghue, 1924
- Family Mandeliidae Valdés & Gosliner, 1999
