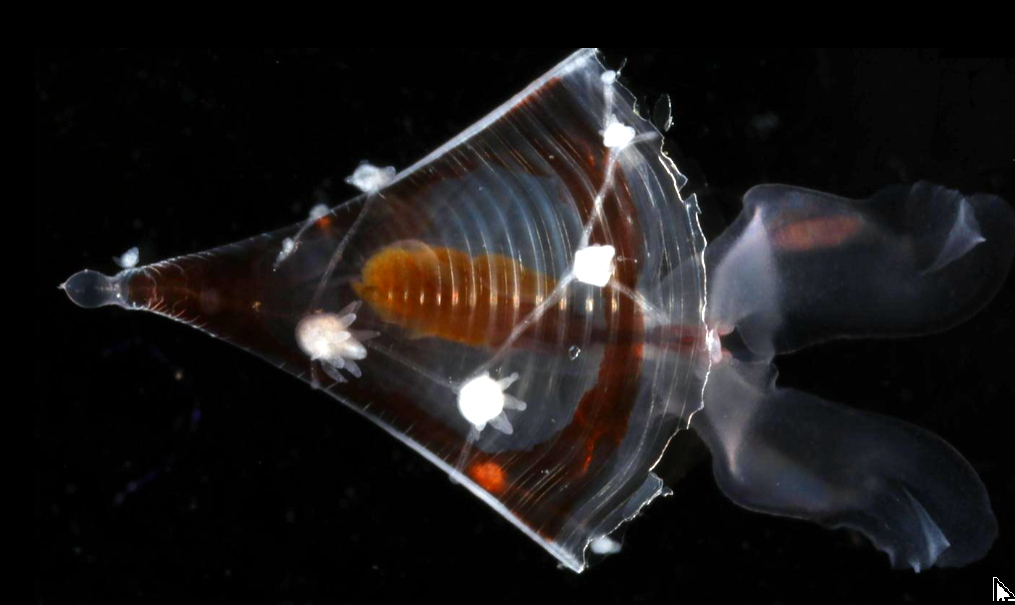
- Clio recurva (specimen at the Smithsonian Institution)

Scientific classification
- Kingdom: Animalia
- Phylum: Mollusca
- Class: Gastropoda
- Clade: Euopisthobranchia
- Order: Pteropoda
- Suborder: Euthecosomata
- Superfamily: Cavolinioidea
- Family: Cliidae
- Genus: Clio; Linnaeus, 1767

Type species
- Clio pyramidata Linnaeus, 1767

Synonyms
- Balantium Children, 1823; † Balantium (Flabellulum) Bellardi, 1873; † Balantium (Poculina) Bellardi, 1873 (invalid: junior homonym of...); † Chaduma Korobkov, 1966; Cleodora Peron & Lesueur, 1810; Clio (Balantium) Children, 1823; Clio (Bellardiclio) A.W. Janssen, 2004; Clio (Clio) Linnaeus, 1767 · alternate representation; † Clio (Nudiclio) Korobkov, 1966; Euclio Bonnevie, 1913 · unaccepted; Hyalaea (Cleodora) F. Péron & Lesueur, 1810 junior objective synonym; Proclio Hubendick, 1951

= Clio (gastropod) =

Genus of gastropods

The genus Clio is a taxonomic group of small floating sea snails, commonly called sea butterflies. These animals are pelagic marine opisthobranch gastropod mollusks, and the sole genus belonging to the family Cliidae.

All species within this genus exhibit a bilaterally symmetrical shell that is either straight or slightly curved dorso-ventrally towards the apex. The shell cross-section is elliptical to triangular. The protoconch is distinct and globular or elliptical, often bearing a spine at its tip.

== Morphology ==
Clio Gastropoda includes a paraphyletic group which is based on the shell morphology of the two groups. Group one has shells that have a rounded protoconch with a sharp apical spine. The group includes but is not limited to the deep sea species which include examples of Clio andrea, Clio polita and Clio piatkowski and the shallow water Clio recurva and Clio cuspidata. The second group has an elongated protoconch with smooth continuation to the apical spine. This group includes but is not limited to: Clio convexa, Clio antartica and Clio pyramidata.

== Life cycles ==
=== Juvenile stage ===
All organs are developed within a juvenile individual except for reproductive organs. In the Juvenile phase of Clio Gastropoda, gonads are present but are in a developmental phase as the gonads are germinal cells. Sexual glands are made of interstitial cells instead of simple sac like structures that are present in other taxa such as Mollusca. This is the penis of the organism still developing as fully grown males have a penial sac that is composed of interstitial cells. Due to the development of the reproductive organs, juveniles are unable to sexually reproduce. Juveniles do have a columellar muscle compared to adult individuals which is much smaller. Juvenile individuals are morphologically distinct from adult individuals as their color is much lighter than fully grown individuals.

=== Adult stage (general) ===
Like in Juvenile stage, the body is of approximately pyramidal shape. The retractor muscle at the dorsal surface side forms the top of the pyramid. The mantle gland, which is located at the ventral side of the body, covers the majority of the structures. Gonad, craniad and liver are all located at the dorsal side of the mollusc. The upper right side of the adult animal contains the gizzard. Clio possesses two tentacles which are located at the neck region. The penial structures and seminal groove can be found along the tentacles in the majority of the species. Adult stages of Clio can be recognised by color. The grown show a darker color and have wings that are light in color. Some regions such as the lips around the mouth, the neck region and adjacent part of the posterior footlobe tend to be reddish brown in colour. The mantle of the mollusc is transparent except for the mantle gland.

=== Male stage ===
In the male phase, organs of the animal are fully developed and Clio shows a gradual transition from juvenile to adult phase. The most typical characteristic of Clio in male phase is penis which is located dorsally in the neck region. The presence of the penis is not unique to the male phase as it can also be present in the individuals that are in hermaphroditic and female phases. The other organs that are also present are gonoduct and active accessory sexual gland, although the accessory sexual gland is not fully developed. The gonad has a follicle structure in Clio that are in the male phase. The gonoduct is connected to the gonad via lumen at the center of the gonad. The lumen is lined by ciliated epithelium. In the young gonads the majority of the cells are spermatogonium and primary spermatocytes, while the follicles that have developed germinating cells additionally contain secondary spermatocytes, spermatids and sperm cells. As the animal lives through the male phase the number of oogonia which can be found around the central lumen increases.

=== Female stage ===
Females are distinct from males as they have accessory sexual glands that are cranial to the gizzard and are larger. Penises are usually absent, but some individuals have degenerated or fully functional penis. When the penis is absent there is no trace of it in the tissue of the neck region or the seminal groove of the female. Females sometimes may be differentiated from males where the gonad walls are more bulbous than male counterparts. Receptaculum seminis are filled with allosperm which is characterized by a permanent wave structure, the organ contains large eggs in different developmental stages. Gonads of the female individuals are called oogonia which develop from the germinal cells. The oogonia cell develops into oocytes that are arranged from largest to smallest from the peripheral gonad walls.

=== Aberrant stage ===
In an individual an aberrant stage may occur which can occur all year long but are less common in spring as the aberrant stages begin to transition gender. In life aberrant stages differ from other individuals as their body color is orange-red, have transparent shells and seem to lack the ability of locomotion. Aberrant stages of life are found across multiple taxa of Clio Gastropoda. Examples include but are not limited to Clio australis (Referred to as Clio antarctica in reference), Clio sucata and Clio pyrtamidata. Some aberrant stages are more specialized as Clio australis is able to have food storage despite an inactive intestinal track and active gonads. Aberrant stages are formed through strobilation as it is a transverse fusion of the individual and grow into a sexual individual.

== Importance ==
Some of the Species In Clio can serve as important bioindicators for our oceans. Concentrations of sea butterflies tend to change in response to ocean acidity and by monitoring their behavior changes in the ocean and earth's climate as a whole may be predicted. Their response to ocean acidity is due to the fact that they use aragonite to make their shells, which becomes more difficult in more acidic waters.

== History ==
Clio antarctica, was first described in 1836 by D'Orbigny under the name Clio australis. However the name was changed due to over lap with the Challenger Report of 1792 as by Bruguière for a species known as Clione australis. Thus the name was changed in 1907–1908 in the "Simithsonian miscellaneous collections".

While some species are classified within subgenera (e.g., Clio s.str., Balantium Bellardi, 1872, Bellardiclio Janssen, 2004), the majority of species remain unassigned to one of these.

Numerous fossil species have been described.

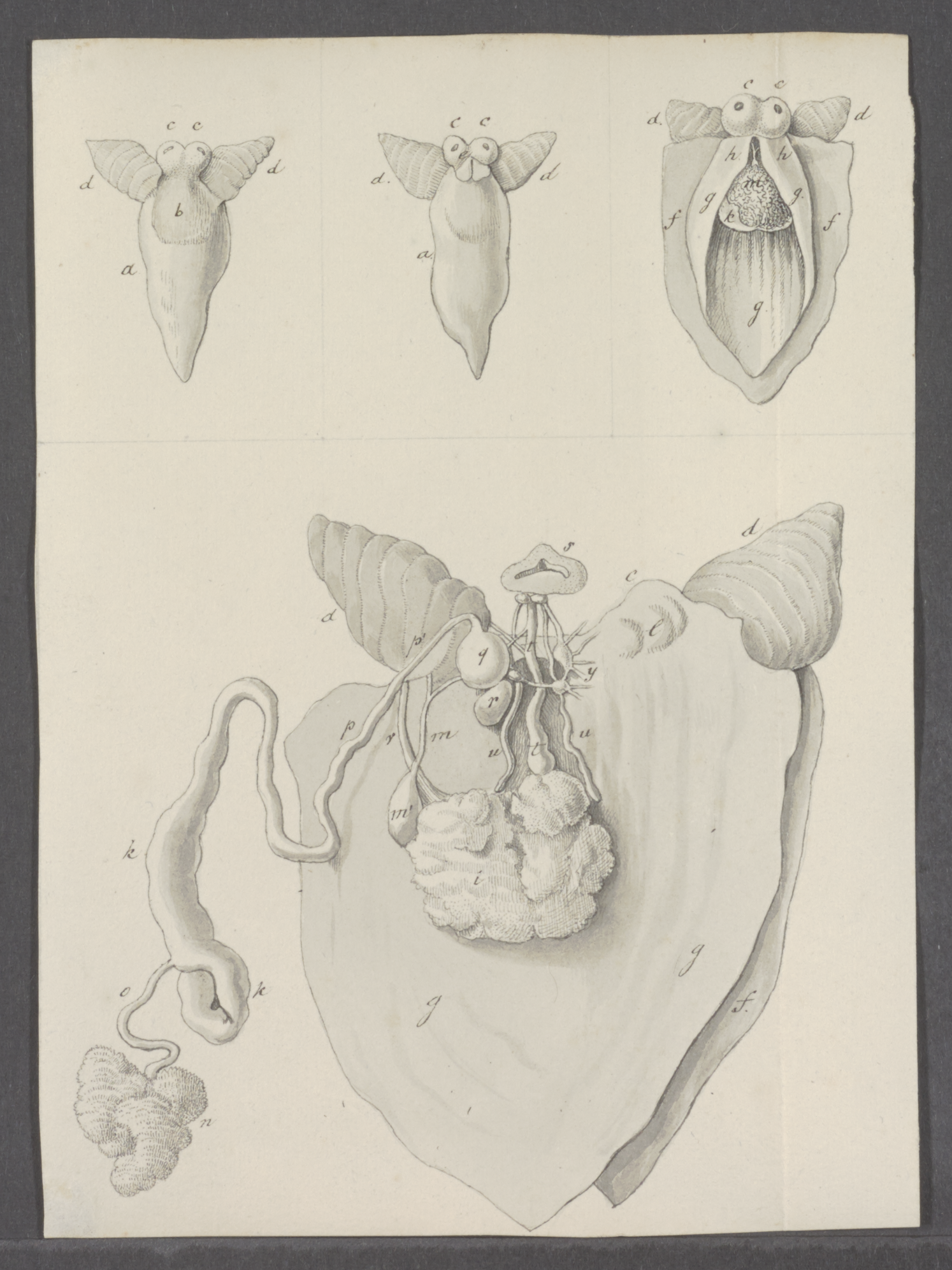
Clio borealis (dissection)

== Species ==
Recognised species are:

- † Clio aichinoi Checchia-Rispoli, 1921
- Clio andreae (Boas, 1886)
  - Distribution : north Atlantic, bathypelagic species.
- Clio bartletti van der Spoel, 1978
  - Distribution: central Atlantic (Pleistocene fossil).
- † Clio bellardii Audenino, 1895
- † Clio berglundorum Squires, 1989
- † Clio blinkae A. W. Janssen, 1989
- † Clio braidensis (Bellardi, 1873)
- † Clio calix (Bellardi, 1873)
- Clio campylura (Tesch, 1948)
- † Clio carinata Audenino, 1895 †
- † Clio chadumica Korobkov, 1966
- Clio chaptalii J. E. Gray, 1850
  - Distribution : tropical, circumglobal.
- † Clio colina A. W. Janssen & Zorn, 2001
- Clio convexa convexa (Boas, 1886)
  - Distribution: tropical, Indo-Pacific
- Clio convexa cyphosa Rampal, 2002
  - Distribution: Red Sea and Gulf of Aden.
- Clio cuspidata (Bosc, 1802)
  - Distribution : tropical/subtropical, circumglobal.
- † Clio distefanoi Checchia-Rispoli, 1921
- † Clio fallauxi (Kittl, 1886)
- Clio flabelliforme (Blankenhorn, 1889)
- † Clio gailae Goedert & A. W. Janssen, 2012
- † Clio ghawdexensis A. W. Janssen, 2003
- † Clio giulioi A. W. Janssen, 1995
- † Clio goedertorum Squires, 1989
- † Clio guidottii Simonelli, 1896
- † Clio hataii (H. Noda, 1972)
- † Clio ichishiensis (Shibata, 1983)
- † Clio irenae A. W. Janssen, 1989
- † Clio itoigawai (Shibata, 1983)
- † Clio jacobae A. W. Janssen, 1989
- † Clio kendacensis P. Jung, 1971
- † Clio lavayssei Rutsch, 1934
- † Clio lozoueti A. W. Janssen, 2010
- † Clio lucai A. W. Janssen, 2000
- † Clio merijni A. W. Janssen, 2012
- † Clio multicostata (Bellardi, 1873)
- † Clio nielseni A. W. Janssen, 1990
- † Clio oblonga Rampal, 1996
- † Clio ortheziana (Benoist, 1889)
- Clio orthotheca (Tesch, 1904)
- † Clio pauli A. W. Janssen, 1989
- † Clio pedemontana (C. Mayer, 1868)
- Clio piatkowskii van der Spoel, Schalk & Bleeker, 1992
  - Distribution: Antarctic.
- Clio polita Pelseneer, 1888
- † Clio pulcherrima (Mayer, 1868)
- Clio pyramidata Linnaeus, 1767
  - Distribution : north Atlantic
  - Height : to over 20 mm.

Formae:

    - forma excisa van der Spoel, 1963
    - forma lanceolata Lesueur, 1813 (tropical/subtropical, circumglobal)
    - forma martensi (Pfeiffer, 1880) ??
    - forma sulcata (Pfeffer, 1879)

The true status of these formae has to be evaluated, they might be real formae, subspecies, or even species.

- Clio recurva (Children, 1823)
  - Distribution : tropical-subtropical, circumglobal (bathypelagic species)**
    - Height: to over 30 mm
- † Clio ricciolii (Calandrelli, 1844)
- † Clio saccoi Checchia-Rispoli, 1921
- † Clio scheelei (Munthe, 1888)
- † Clio shibatai Ujihara, 1996
- † Clio sulcosa (Bellardi, 1873)
- † Clio triplicata Audenino, 1895
- † Clio vasconiensis A. W. Janssen, 2010
- † Clio vilis A. W. Janssen, 2012

Species brought into synonymy

- Clio antarctica Dall, 1908: synonym of Clio pyramidata antarctica Dall, 1908 accepted as Clio pyramidata Linnaeus, 1767 (superseded combination)
- Clio australis: synonym of Clione limacina australis (Bruguière, 1792)
- Clio borealis (Pallas, 1774): synonym of Clione limacina (Phipps, 1774)
- Clio helicina Phipps, 1774: synonym of Limacina helicina (Phipps, 1774)
- Clio sulcata (Pfeffer, 1879): synonym of Clio pyramidata f. sulcata (Pfeffer, 1879) accepted as Clio pyramidata Linnaeus, 1767
