= Cuvierina atlantica =

Scientific classification
- Kingdom: Animalia
- Phylum: Mollusca
- Class: Gastropoda
- Clade: Euopisthobranchia
- Order: Pteropoda
- Superfamily: Cavolinioidea
- Family: Cuvierinidae
- Genus: Cuvierina
- Species: C. atlantica

Binomial name
- Cuvierina atlantica Bé, MacClintock & Currie, 1972

Synonyms
- Cuvierina columnella atlantica Bé, MacClintock & Currie, 1972 (original rank); Cuvierina columnella f. atlantica van der Spoel, 1970 (not available: infrasubspecific name established after 1960); Cuvierina major Rampal, 2019

Species of mollusc

Cuvierina atlantica is a species of sea mollusk, commonly known as a sea-angel pteropod.

== Distribution ==
This species occurs in the North Atlantic Ocean.

== Anatomy ==
The gastropod has small flaps it uses to swim, as well as a cylindrical shell for protection.

== General information ==
Cuvierina atlantica are able to generate thrust on two occasions during each wingbeat cycle, in comparison with sea butterflies that swim like flapping insects, which only generate thrust once.
