= Cuvieria =

Cuvieria may refer to:

- Cuvieria (cnidarian), a genus of hydrozoans in the family Dipleurosomatidae
- Cuvieria, a synonym for Psolus, a genus of sea cucumbers
- Cuvieria, a synonym for Cuvierina, a genus of gastropods in the family Cuvierinidae
