= Creseis roesti =

Creseis roesti Temporal range: Aquitanian–Burdigalian

Scientific classification
- Kingdom: Animalia
- Phylum: Mollusca
- Class: Gastropoda
- Clade: Euopisthobranchia
- Order: Pteropoda
- Family: Creseidae
- Genus: Creseis
- Species: †C. roesti

Binomial name
- †Creseis roesti A. W. Janssen, 2010

Species of butterfly

Creseis roesti is a species of sea butterfly. It feeds on holoplanktonic organisms.

The species' fossils have been observed in the south of France and Catalonia, in the Caribbean, and near the Korean Peninsula. Its fossilized state and taphonomy has contained aragonite.
