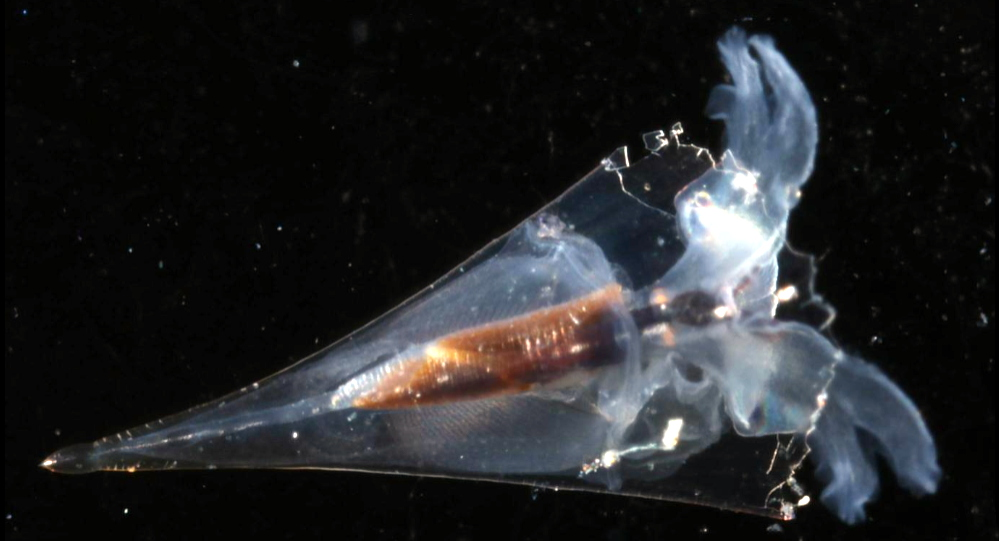
- Clio pyramidata (specimen at the Smithsonian Institution)

Scientific classification
- Kingdom: Animalia
- Phylum: Mollusca
- Class: Gastropoda
- Clade: Euopisthobranchia
- Order: Pteropoda
- Family: Cliidae
- Genus: Clio
- Species: C. pyramidata

Binomial name
- Clio pyramidata Linnaeus, 1767

Synonyms
- Clio caudata Linnaeus, 1767; Hyalaea lanceolata Lesueur, 1813; Cleodora brownii de Blainville, 1825; Cleodora exacuta Gould, 1852; Clio occidentalis Dall, 1871; Clio pyramidata var. convexa Boas, 1886

= Clio pyramidata =

Species of gastropod

Clio pyramidata is a species of sea butterfly, a floating and swimming sea snail, a pelagic marine gastropod mollusk in the family Cliidae.

== Formae ==
- Forma Clio pyramidata f. lanceolata Lesueur, 1813
- Forma Clio pyramidata f. pyramidata Linnaeus, 1767
- Forma Clio pyramidata f. tyrrhenica A.W. Janssen, 2012

== Distribution ==
This species has a wide distribution: subtropical., European waters, the Mediterranean Sea, the Atlantic Ocean (Azores, Cape Verde), the Northwest Atlantic (Gulf of Maine), the Caribbean Sea, the Gulf of Mexico, and off New Zealand.

== Description ==
The maximum recorded shell length is 21 mm.

== Habitat ==
Minimum recorded depth is 0 m. Maximum recorded depth is 3718 m.
