= Sphaerocinidae =

Scientific classification
- Kingdom: Animalia
- Phylum: Mollusca
- Class: Gastropoda
- Clade: Euopisthobranchia
- Order: Pteropoda
- Superfamily: Cavolinioidea
- Family: †Sphaerocinidae; A. Janssen & Maxwell, 1995

Extinct family of gastropods

Sphaerocinidae is an extinct taxonomic family of fossil sea snails, sea butterflies, marine opisthobranch gastropod mollusks within the superfamily Cavolinioidea.
