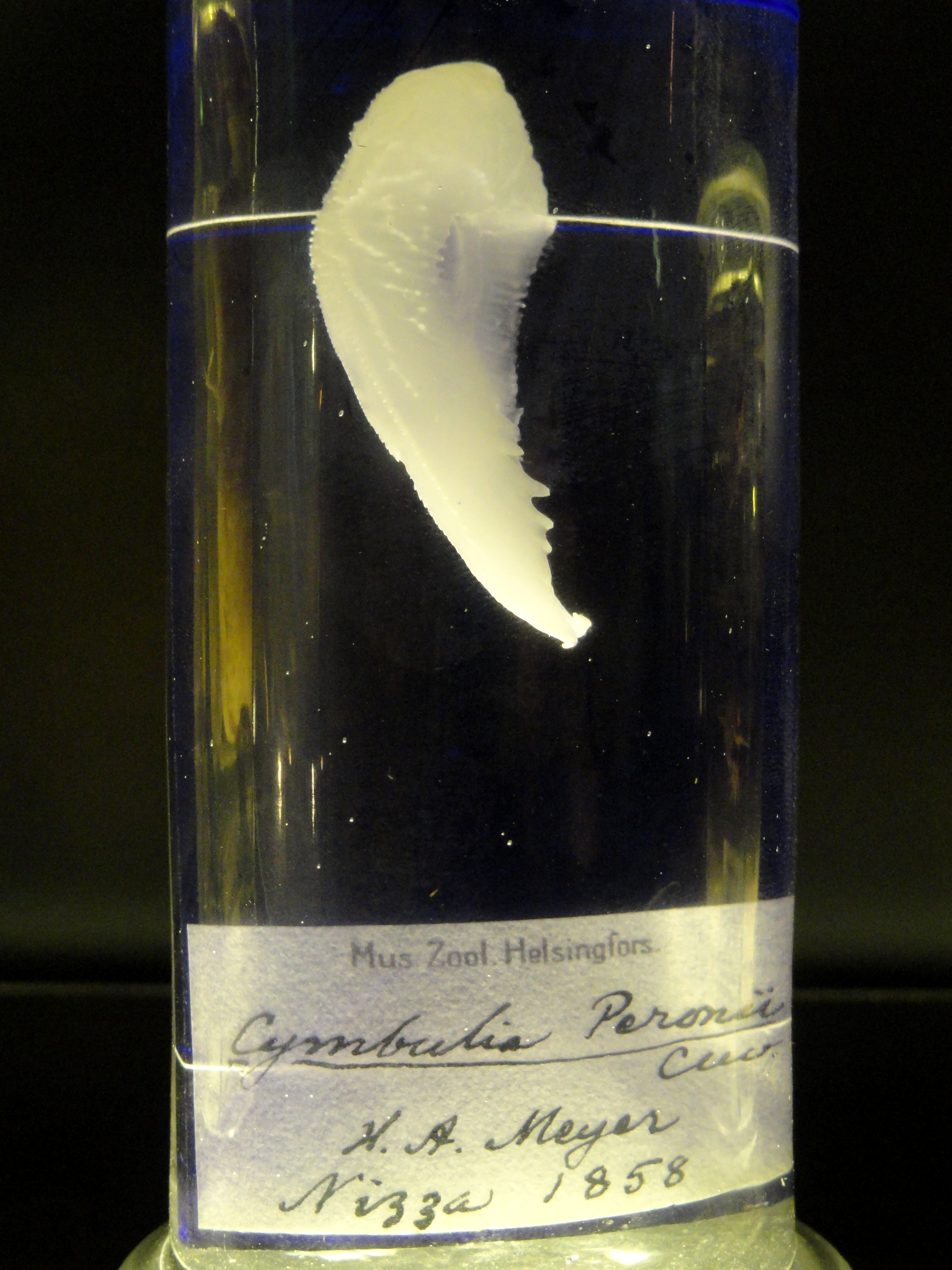
- A shell sample
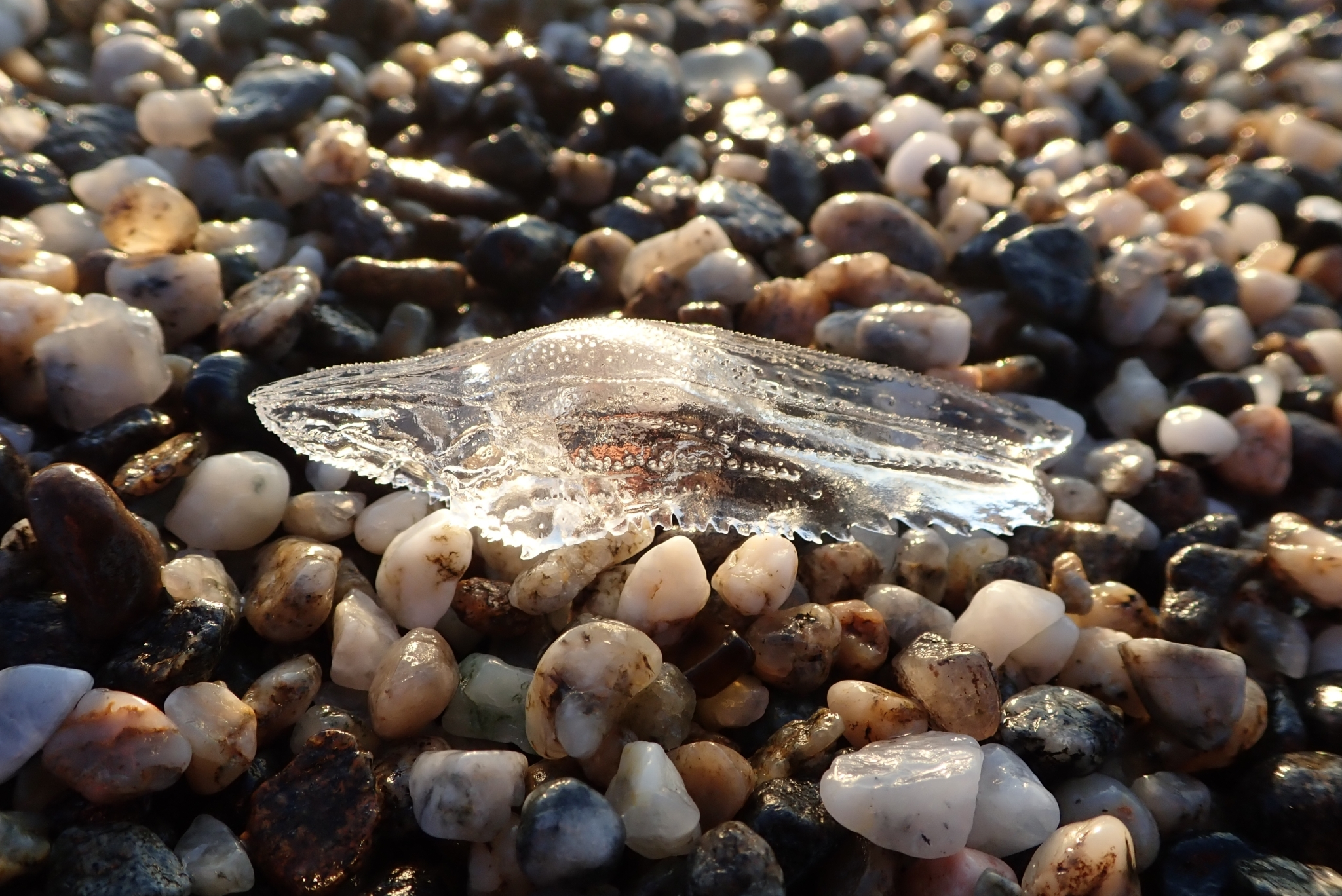
- "glass slipper"

Scientific classification
- Kingdom: Animalia
- Phylum: Mollusca
- Class: Gastropoda
- Clade: Euopisthobranchia
- Order: Pteropoda
- Family: Cymbuliidae
- Genus: Cymbulia
- Species: C. peronii

Binomial name
- Cymbulia peronii Blainville, 1818

= Cymbulia peronii =

Species of gastropod

Cymbulia peronii is a species of pteropod. It is a pellagic gastropod mollusk. Specifically, it is a sea butterfly part of the Cymbulioidea superfamily.

== Name ==
Cymbulia derives from the Latin cymbula, meaning “small boat,” while peronii honors François Péron (1775–1810), a French naturalist who, after being wounded and imprisoned during the wars against Prussia, studied medicine and natural history and later served as a ship’s doctor aboard Le Géographe on the 1800–1804 expedition to Australia, collaborating extensively with Charles-Alexandre Lesueur.

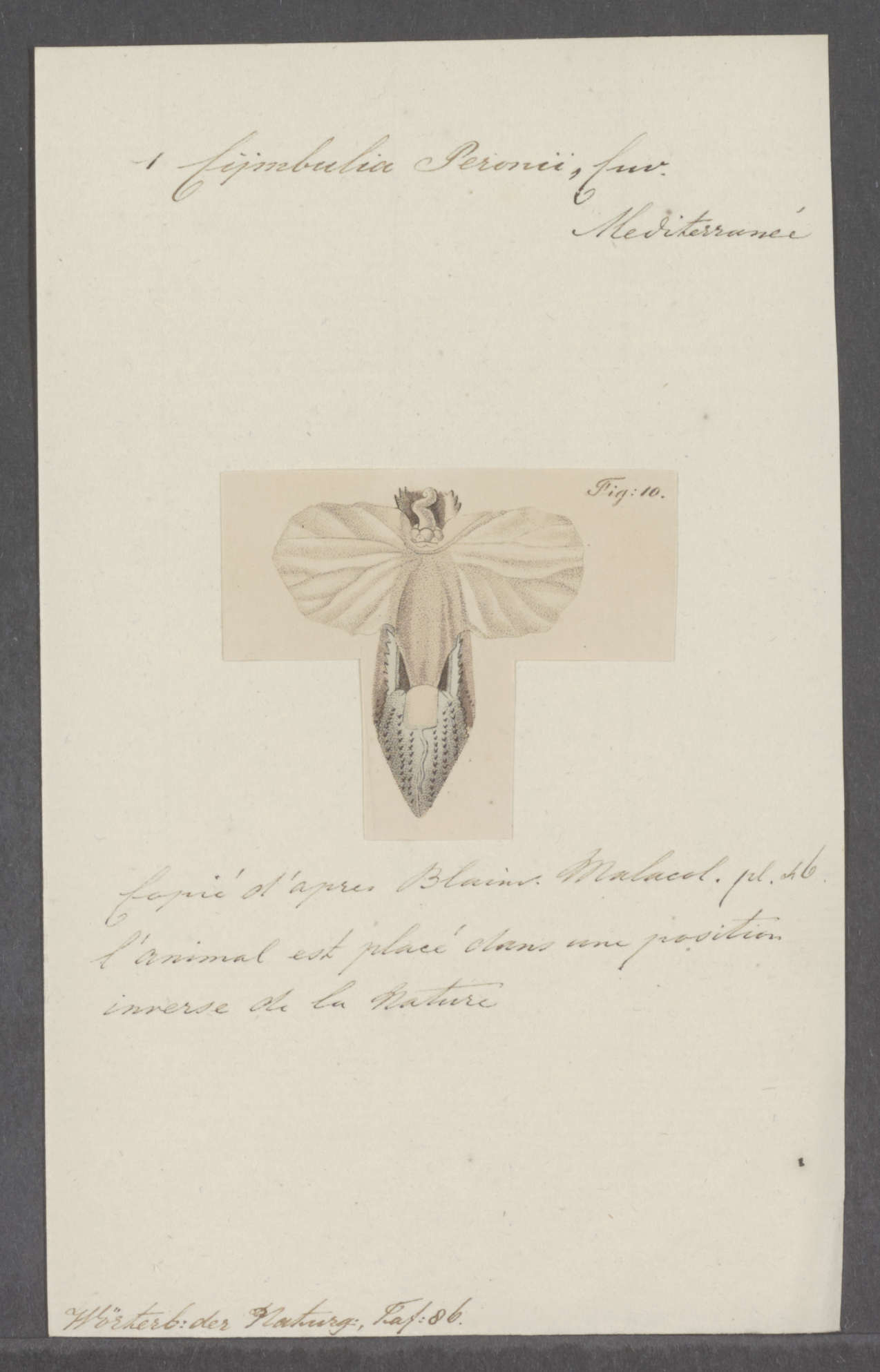
Illustration from the University of Amsterdam Archives

== Distribution ==
The species inhabits waters concentrating around the extreme south-east United States, the Balearic Islands of Spain, Svalbard, and the offshores of Namibia, sometimes down to about 2,000 m (6,560 ft) depth, carried by currents. It can withstand temperatures of 13–27 °C (55–81 °F).

== Anatomy ==
It reaches about 60–65 mm (2.4–2.6 in) in length and has a translucent, bluish body with two wing-like parapods used for slow movement. During development it retains a transparent, cartilaginous internal shell (pseudoconch) with five dentate ridges that resembles a “glass slipper” or gelatinous crystal-like structure often found washed up on beaches after the animal’s death, sometimes called a "venus' hoof".

== Alimentation ==
Cymbulia peronii often captures prey by having its oral organs open while drifting, and feeds on phytoplankton, mucus, diatoms and other chromists. It is a passive predator, and utilizes hair-like tentacles to sense and detect nearby prey.

== Reproduction ==
Reproduction and breeding takes place temporally from June to August. The animals are protandrous hermaphrodites, meaning male characteristics develop first, with individuals becoming female as they age; this is known as successive hermaphroditism. Reproduction takes place in the planktonic environment through the release of gametes and the development of veliger larvae (gastropod larvae).
