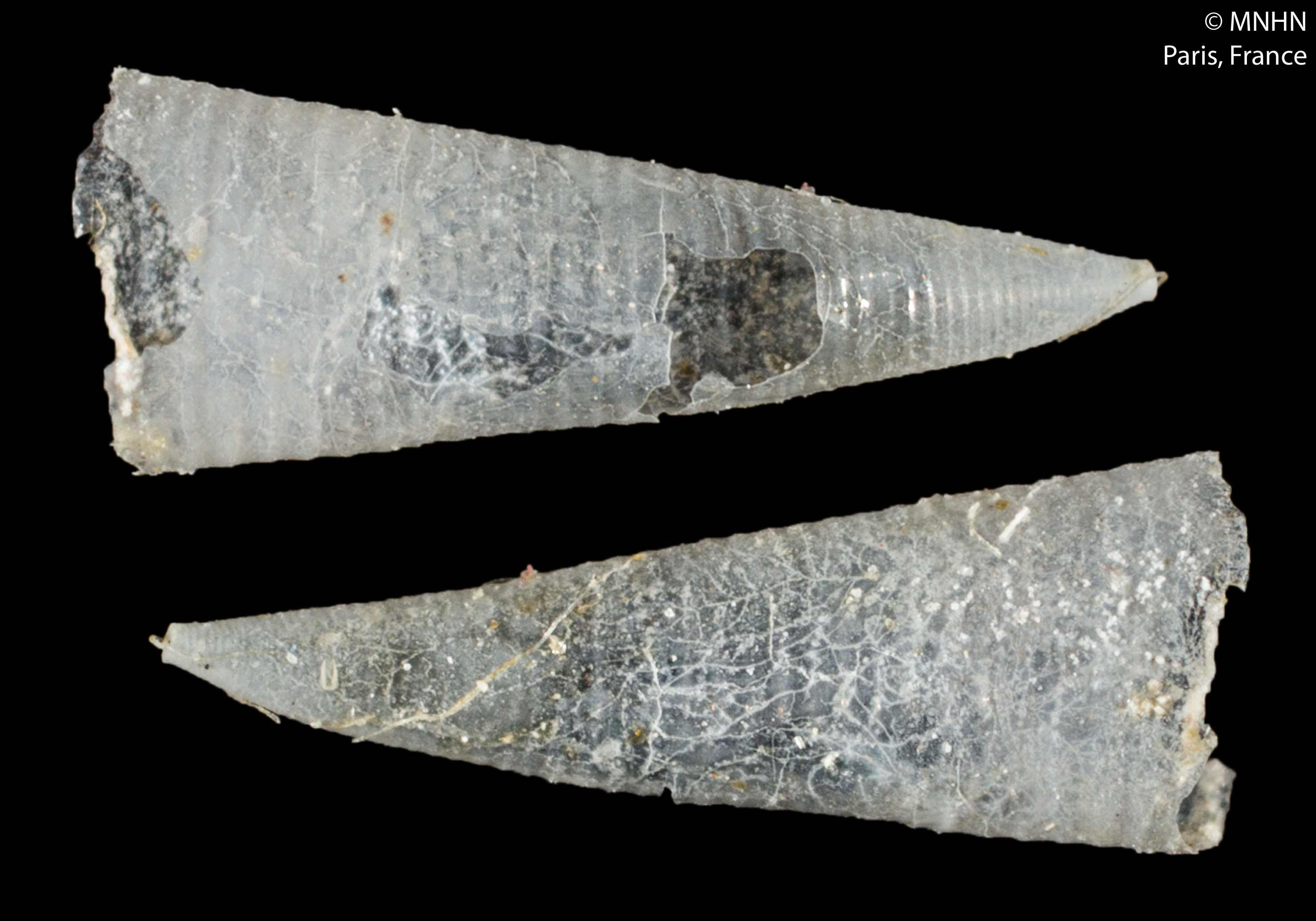

Scientific classification
- Kingdom: Animalia
- Phylum: Mollusca
- Class: Gastropoda
- Clade: Euopisthobranchia
- Order: Pteropoda
- Superfamily: Cavolinioidea
- Family: Hyalocylidae
- Genus: Hyalocylis
- Species: H. striata

Binomial name
- Hyalocylis striata (Rang, 1828)

Synonyms
- Cleodora (Creseis) striata Rang, 1828; Cleodora striata Rang, 1828 (original combination); Creseis annulata Deshayes, 1853; Creseis compressa Eschscholtz, 1829; Creseis rugulosa Cantraine, 1841 (dubious synonym); Creseis sulcata Benoit, 1843 (synonym); Creseis zonata Delle Chiaje, 1830; † Hyalocylis cretacea (Blanckenhorn, 1890); † Hyalocylis euphratensis Avnimelech, 1945; † Hyalocylis haitensis (R. L. Collins, 1934); Hyalocylis obtusa Di Geronimo, 1974; †Hyalocylix haitensis R. L. Collins, 1934; † Praehyalocylis cretacea (Blanckenhorn, 1889); † Tentaculites cretaceus Blanckenhorn, 1889

= Hyalocylis striata =

Species of mollusc

Hyalocylis striata is a species of Hyalocylis, a pteropod. It is a gastropod mollusk.

== Distribution ==
This marine species is circumtropical and is commonly found in deep waters

== Etymology ==
Hyalocylis, from Ancient Greek “υαλινος”, “of crystal or glass”. Striata, because of the numerous and regular grooves of the shell that indicate its successive enlargements.
