= Tibiella (gastropod) =

Scientific classification
- Kingdom: Animalia
- Phylum: Mollusca
- Class: Gastropoda
- Clade: Euopisthobranchia
- Order: Pteropoda
- Suborder: Euthecosomata
- Superfamily: Cavolinioidea
- Family: Creseidae
- Genus: †Tibiella; Meyer, 1884

Type species
- † Tibiella marshi O. Meyer, 1884

Extinct genus of gastropods

Tibiella is an extinct genus of gastropods belonging to the family Creseidae.

Fossils of the species of this genus are found in Northern America.

Species:

- †Tibiella annulata Garvie, 1992
- † Tibiella marshi Meyer, 1884
- †Tibiella reflexa Hodgkinson, 1992
- †Tibiella taxana Collins, 1934
- †Tibiella texana Collins, 1934
- †Tibiella watupuruensis Janssen, 2013
