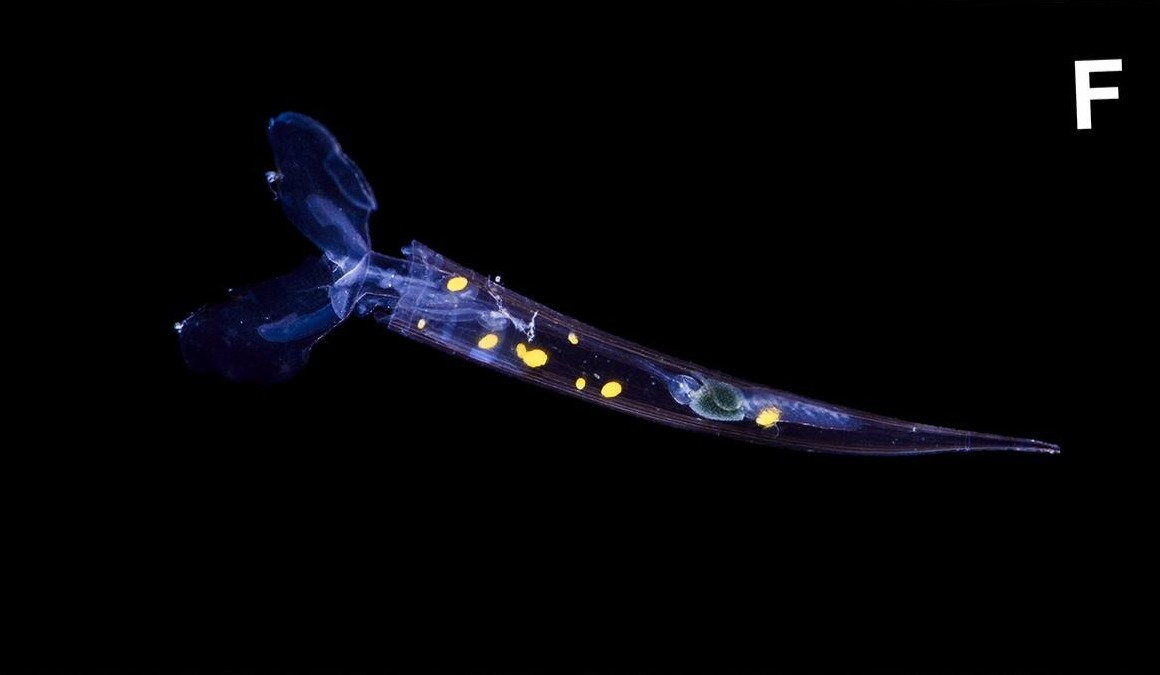

Scientific classification
- Kingdom: Animalia
- Phylum: Mollusca
- Class: Gastropoda
- Clade: Euopisthobranchia
- Order: Pteropoda
- Family: Creseidae
- Genus: Creseis
- Species: C. conica

Binomial name
- Creseis conica Eschscholtz, 1829

= Creseis conica =

Species of gastropod

Creseis conica is a species of 'sea butterfly' in the order Pteropoda.

== Distribution ==
Creseis conica has been observed worldwide in tropical and temperate seas. In islands surrounding New Zealand, the species inhabits 0–500 metres (0–1,640 ft) underwater, in temperatures ranging from 10–30 °C (50–86 °F).

== Description ==
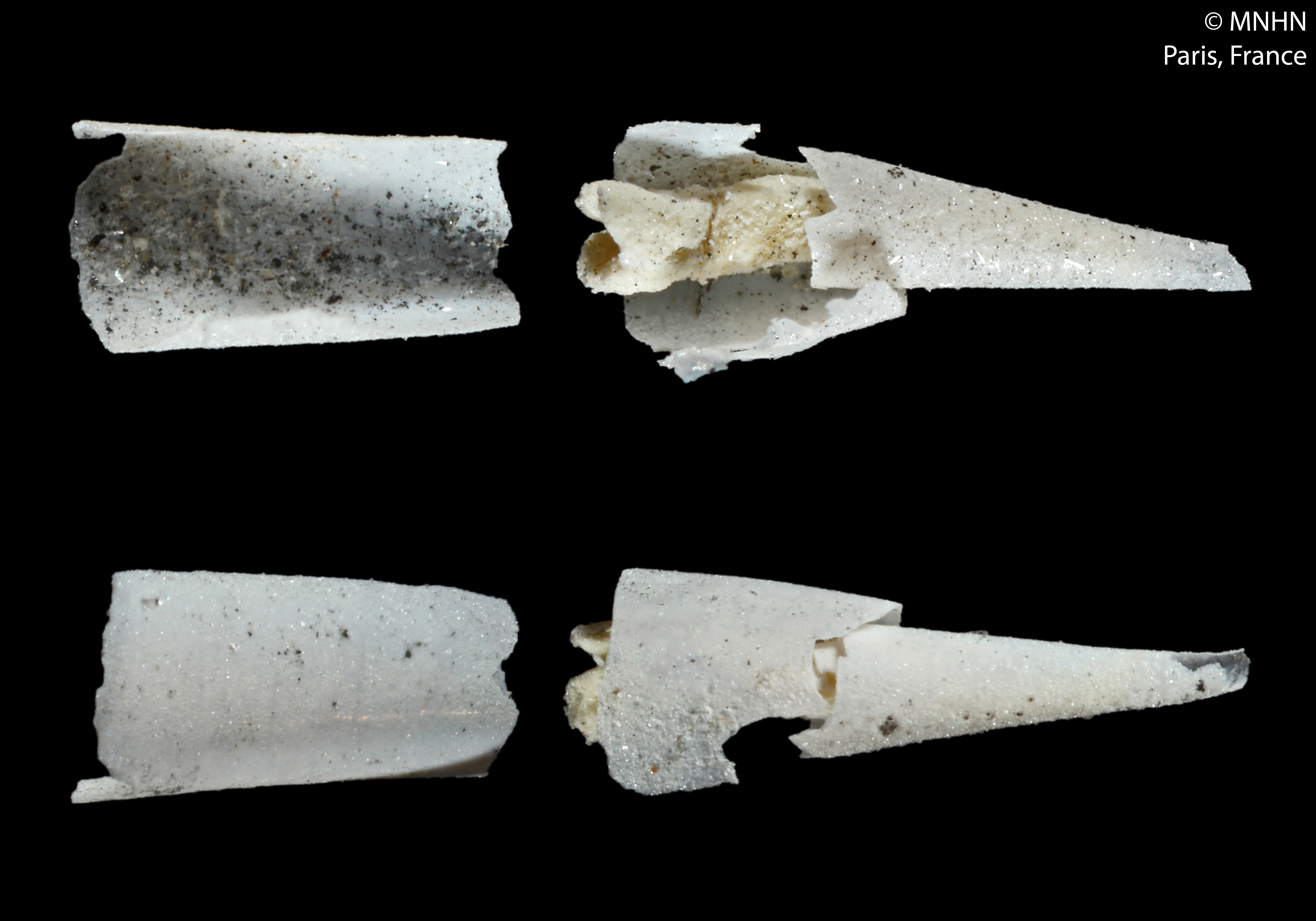
A shell sample

The species can grow up to 0.7 centimetres (0.28 in) long, and is surrounded by a thin and brittle uncoiled shell. A fully grown shell is approximately the same size as the pteropod itself, and is colourless. The diameter of the aperture is 1 millimetre. It has wing appendages and a short columellar muscle. It feeds off of protozoans and phytoplankton, closer to the surface from the ocean.
