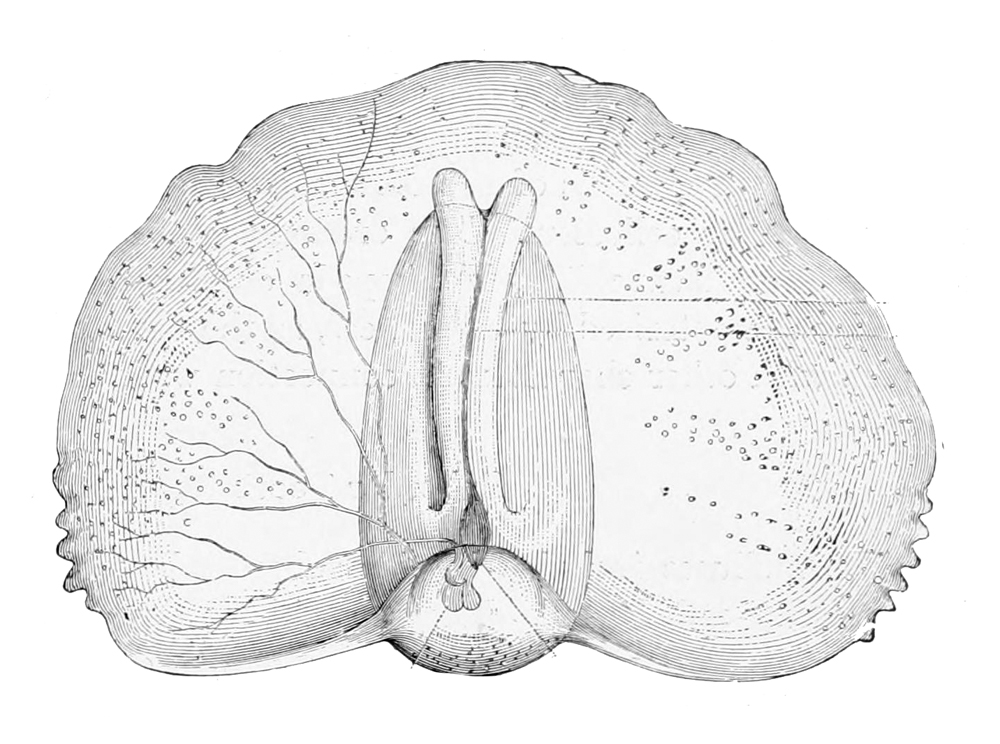

Scientific classification
- Kingdom: Animalia
- Phylum: Mollusca
- Class: Gastropoda
- Clade: Euopisthobranchia
- Order: Pteropoda
- Family: Cymbuliidae
- Subfamily: Glebinae
- Genus: Gleba; Forsskål, 1776
- Species: G. cordata

Binomial name
- Gleba cordata Niebuhr, 1776

= Gleba cordata =

Species of gastropod

Gleba cordata is a species of sea butterfly, a floating and swimming sea snail or sea slug, a pelagic marine gastropod mollusc in the family Cymbuliidae.
