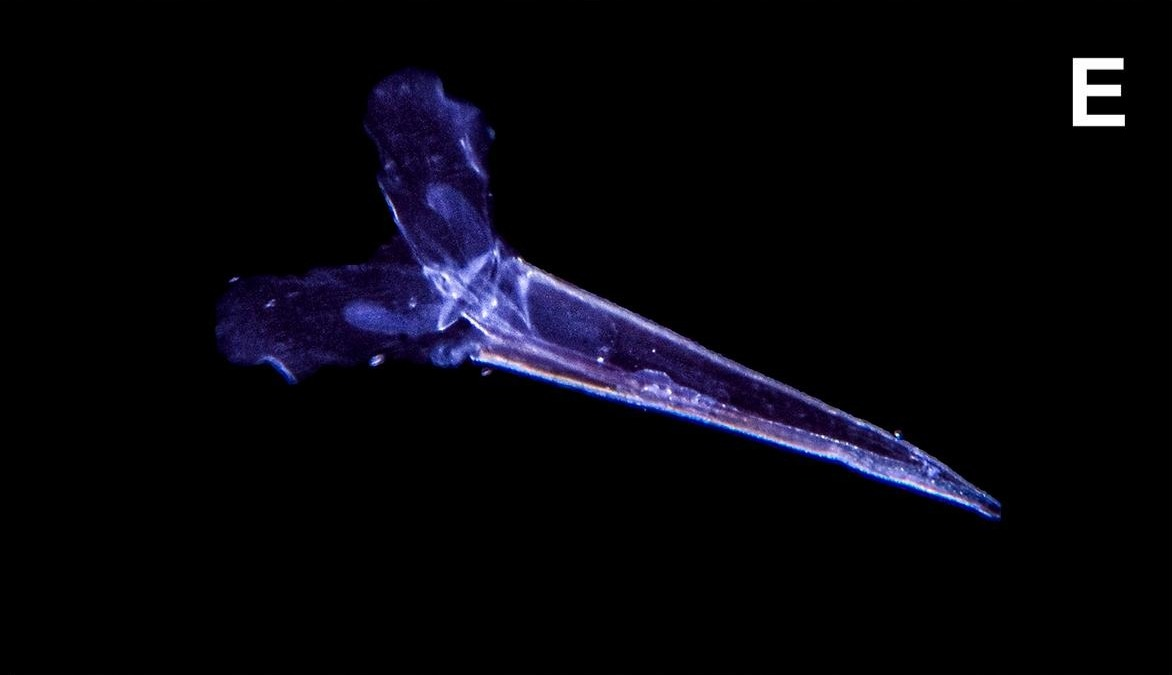
- Creseis acicula, from the Catalan coast
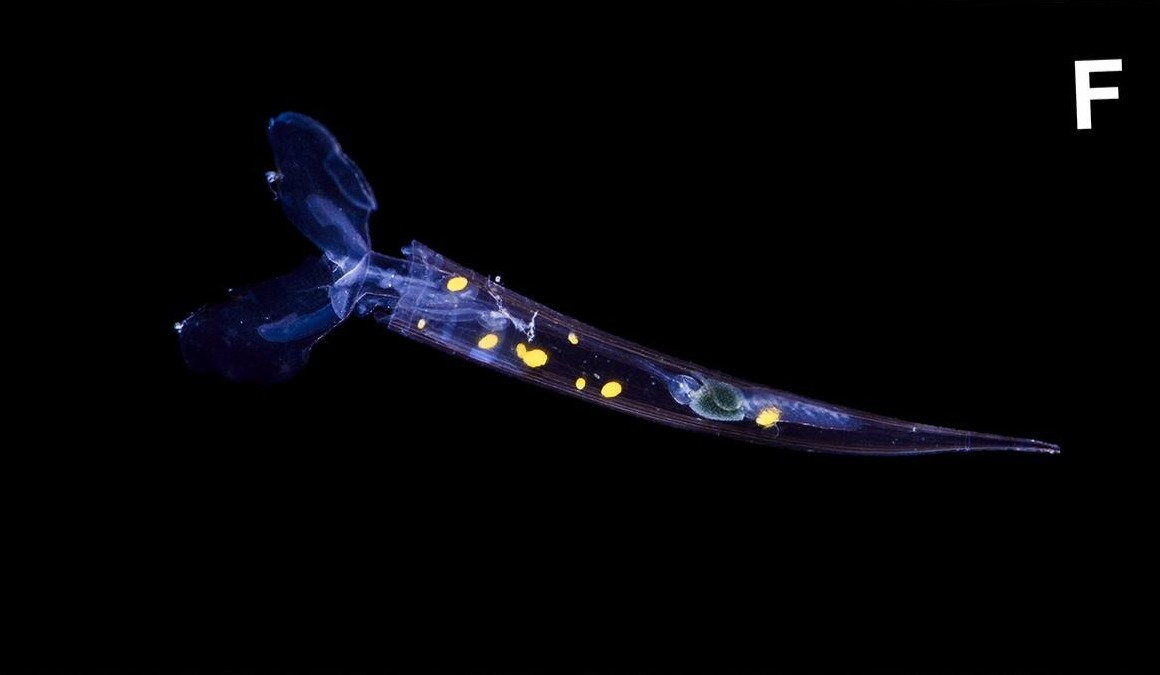
- Creseis conica, from the Catalan coast

Scientific classification
- Kingdom: Animalia
- Phylum: Mollusca
- Class: Gastropoda
- Clade: Euopisthobranchia
- Order: Pteropoda
- Family: Creseidae
- Genus: Creseis; Rang, 1828

= Creseis =

Genus of gastropods

Creseis is a genus of gastropods belonging to the family Creseidae.

The genus has cosmopolitan distribution.

Species:

- Creseis acicula (Rang, 1828)
- Creseis antoni Cahuzac & A.W.Janssen, 2010
- Creseis aquensis Benoist, 1889
- Creseis berthae A.W.Janssen, 1989
- Creseis conica Eschscholtz, 1829
- Creseis corpulenta (O.Meyer, 1887)
- Creseis curta A.W.Janssen, 2012
- Creseis cylindrica Hodgkinson, 1992
- Creseis kishimaensis Ando, 2011
- Creseis maxima (Ludwig, 1864)
- Creseis monotis Troschel, 1854
- Creseis phaeostoma Troschel, 1854
- Creseis roesti A.W.Janssen, 2010
- Creseis simplex (O.Meyer, 1886)
- Creseis spina (Reuss, 1867)
- Creseis tugurii Cahuzac & A.W.Janssen, 2010
- Creseis virgula (Rang, 1828)
