= Styliola subula =

Scientific classification
- Kingdom: Animalia
- Phylum: Mollusca
- Class: Gastropoda
- Clade: Euopisthobranchia
- Order: Pteropoda
- Family: Creseidae
- Genus: Styliola
- Species: S. subula

Binomial name
- Styliola subula (Quoy & Gaimard, 1827)

Species of gastropod

Styliola subula is a species of gastropods belonging to the family Creseidae.

== Analysis ==
The species has almost cosmopolitan distribution. It is a pelagic pteropod species that lives in deep waters.

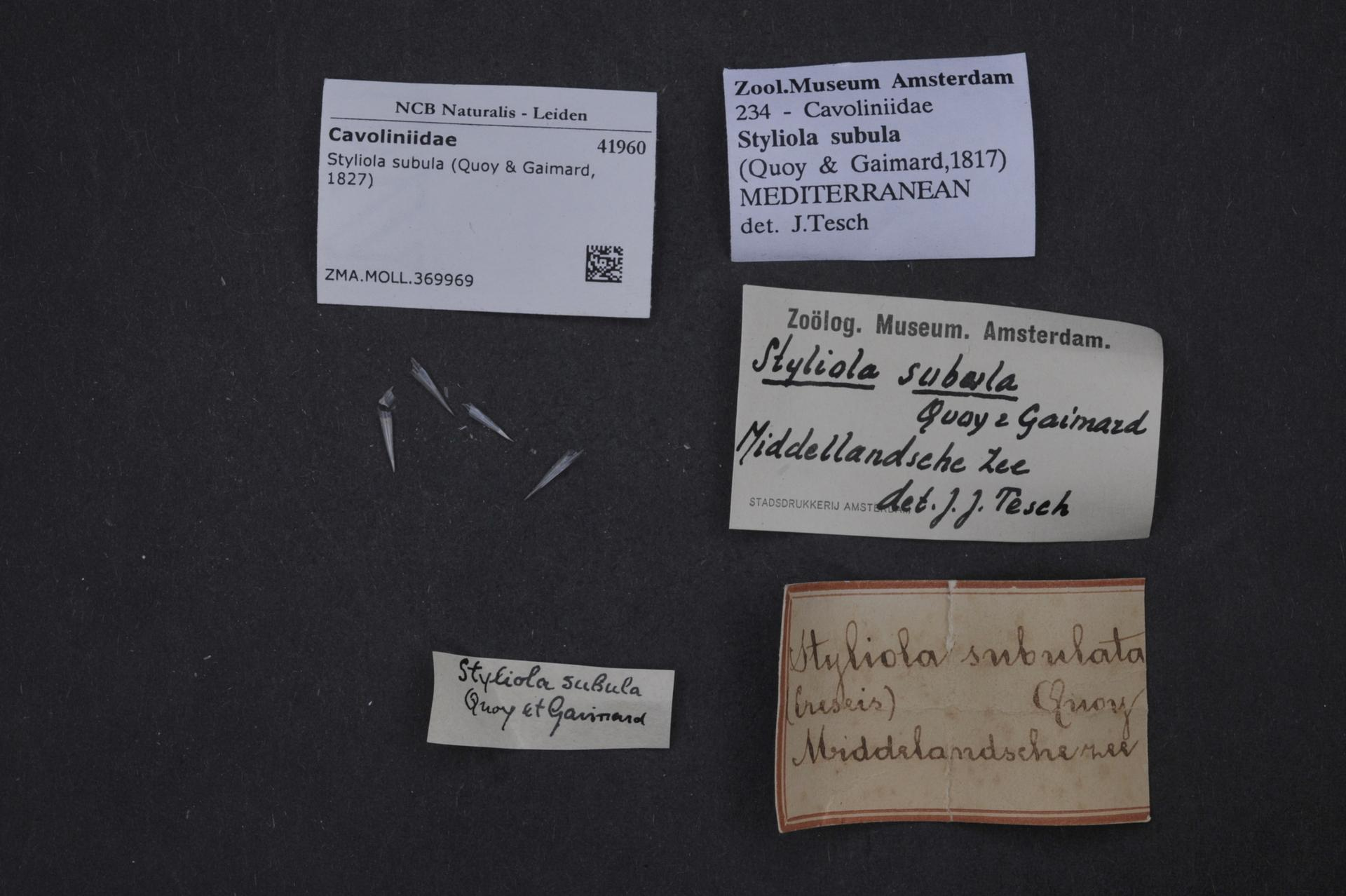
Naturalis Biodiversity Center Display
