= Praecuvierinidae =

Praecuvierinidae Temporal range: Eocene

Scientific classification
- Kingdom: Animalia
- Phylum: Mollusca
- Class: Gastropoda
- Clade: Euopisthobranchia
- Order: Pteropoda
- Suborder: Euthecosomata
- Superfamily: Cavolinioidea
- Family: †Praecuvierinidae; Janssen, 2005

Diversity
- 2 genera

Family of gastropods

The Praecuvierinidae are a family of extinct, small, floating sea snails, pelagic marine opisthobranch gastropod mollusks in the superfamily Cavolinioidea.

== Genera ==
- Genus Praecuvierina Janssen, 2005
  - Praecuvierina lura (Hodgkinson, in Hodgkinson, Garvie & Bé, 1992) - from Eocene, Lutetian of the United States
- Genus Texacuvierina Janssen, 2005
  - Texacuvierina gutta (Hodgkinson, in Hodgkinson, Garvie & Bé, 1992) - from Eocene, Bartonian of the United States
