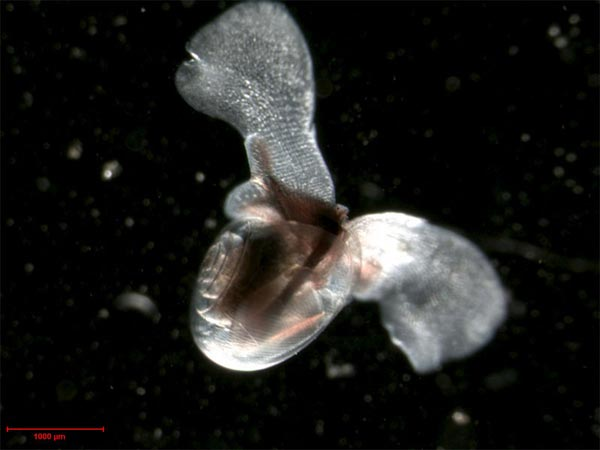
- a free-floating Limacina helicina

Scientific classification
- Kingdom: Animalia
- Phylum: Mollusca
- Class: Gastropoda
- Clade: Euopisthobranchia
- Order: Pteropoda
- Suborder: Thecosomata
- Superfamily: Limacinoidea; Gray, 1840

= Limacinoidea =

Superfamily of gastropods

The superfamily Limacinoidea is a taxonomic group of small floating sea snails, pelagic marine opisthobranch gastropod mollusks.

== Families ==
These families previously belonged to the superfamily Cavolinioidea.

- Creseidae Rampal, 1973
- Limacinidae Rampal, 1973

Families brought into synonymy

- Spiratellidae Dall, 1921: synonym of Limacinidae
- Spirialidae Chenu, 1859: synonym of Limacinidae
