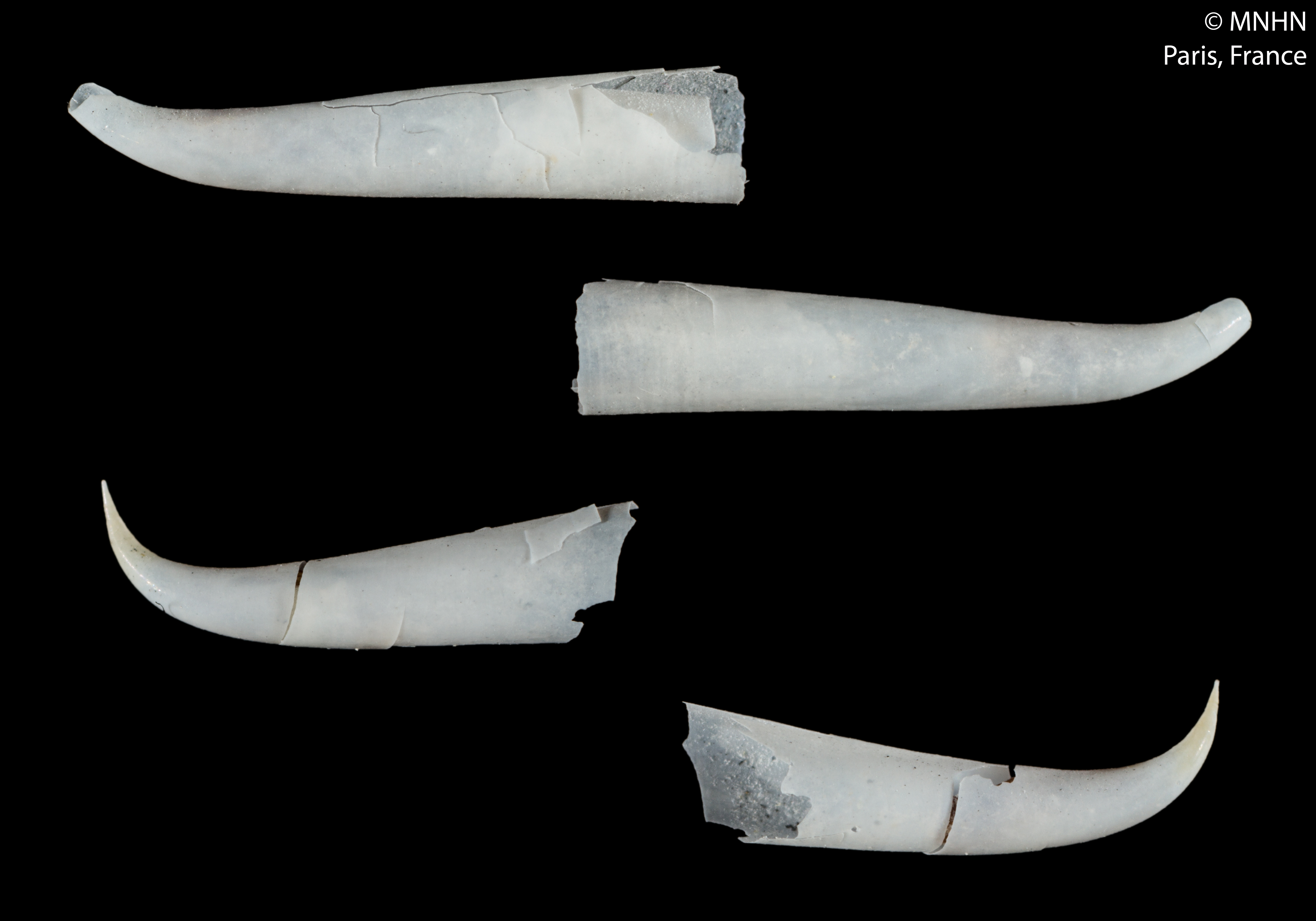
- Shells of Creseis virgula

Scientific classification
- Domain: Eukaryota
- Kingdom: Animalia
- Phylum: Mollusca
- Class: Gastropoda
- Clade: Euopisthobranchia
- Order: Pteropoda
- Family: Creseidae
- Genus: Creseis
- Species: C. virgula

Binomial name
- Creseis virgula (Rang, 1828)

= Creseis virgula =

Species of gastropod

Creseis virgula is a species of gastropods belonging to the family Creseidae. The larvae are zooplankton.

The species has almost cosmopolitan distribution. It is a pteropod.
