= Styliola =

Scientific classification
- Kingdom: Animalia
- Phylum: Mollusca
- Class: Gastropoda
- Clade: Euopisthobranchia
- Order: Pteropoda
- Family: Creseidae
- Genus: Styliola; Gray, 1847

Genus of gastropods

Styliola is a genus of gastropods belonging to the family Creseidae.

The genus has cosmopolitan distribution.

Species:

- Styliola lamberti Checchia-Rispoli, 1922
- Styliola schembriorum A.W.Janssen, 2012
- Styliola sinecosta F.E.Wells, 1974
- Styliola subula (Quoy & Gaimard, 1827)
