= Hyalocylis =

Scientific classification
- Domain: Eukaryota
- Kingdom: Animalia
- Phylum: Mollusca
- Class: Gastropoda
- Clade: Euopisthobranchia
- Order: Pteropoda
- Family: Hyalocylidae
- Genus: Hyalocylis; Fol, 1875

Genus of molluscs

Hyalocylis is a genus of gastropods belonging to the family Hyalocylidae. The genus has almost cosmopolitan distribution.

== Species ==
There are two recognized species:

- Hyalocylis marginata Janssen, 2007
- Hyalocylis striata (Rang, 1828)
