= Peracle charlotteae =

Peracle charlotteae Temporal range: Miocene

Scientific classification
- Domain: Eukaryota
- Kingdom: Animalia
- Phylum: Mollusca
- Class: Gastropoda
- Clade: Euopisthobranchia
- Order: Pteropoda
- Family: Peraclidae
- Genus: Peracle
- Species: P. charlotteae

Binomial name
- Peracle charlotteae Janssen & Little, 2010

Extinct species of gastropod

Peracle charlotteae is an extinct species of fossil pelagic sea snail, or "sea butterfly", a planktonic marine gastropod mollusk in the family Peraclidae.

This species existed in what is now Cyprus during the Miocene period. It was described by Arie W. Janssen and Crispin T. S. Little in 2010.
