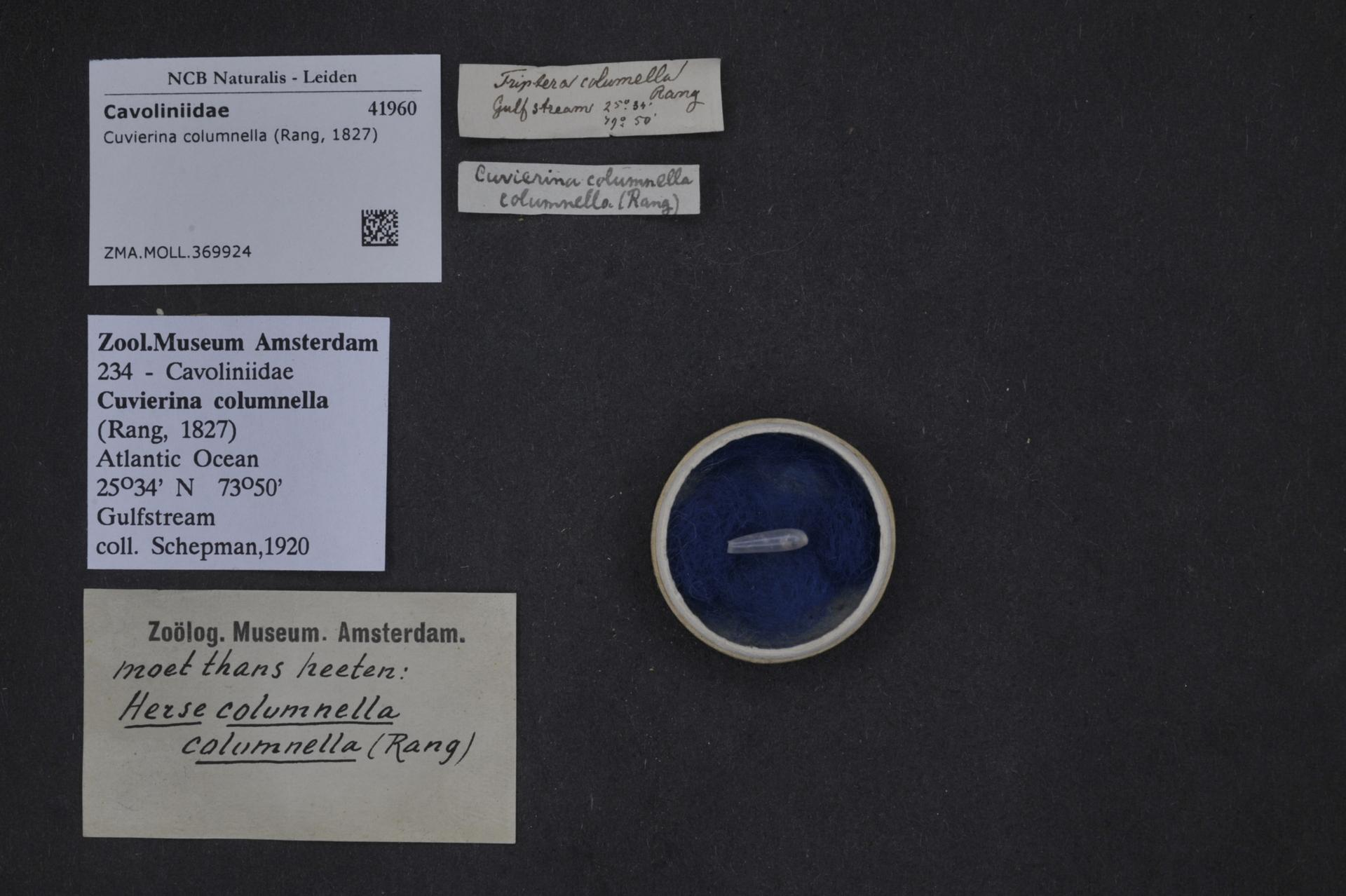

Scientific classification
- Domain: Eukaryota
- Kingdom: Animalia
- Phylum: Mollusca
- Class: Gastropoda
- Clade: Euopisthobranchia
- Order: Pteropoda
- Family: Cuvierinidae
- Genus: Cuvierina
- Species: C. columnella

Binomial name
- Cuvierina columnella (Rang, 1827)

= Cuvierina columnella =

Species of Gastropoda

Cuvierina columnella is a species of gastropod in the family Cuvierinidae.
