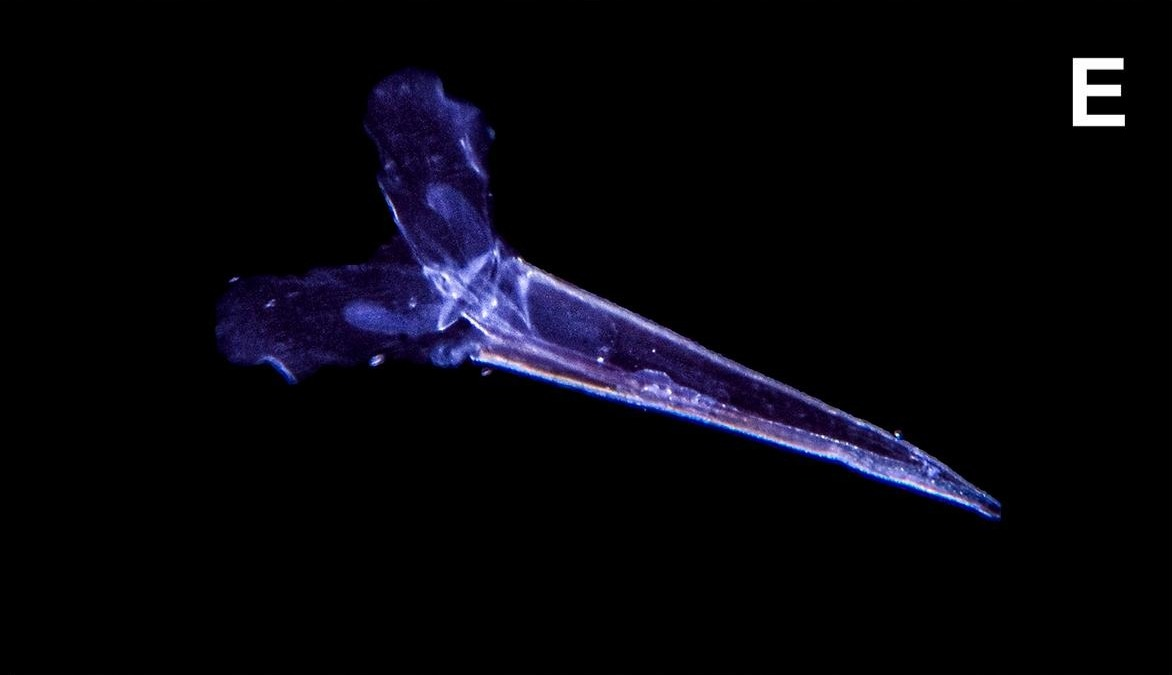
- Specimen from the Catalan coast

Scientific classification
- Kingdom: Animalia
- Phylum: Mollusca
- Class: Gastropoda
- Clade: Euopisthobranchia
- Order: Pteropoda
- Family: Creseidae
- Genus: Creseis
- Species: C. acicula

Binomial name
- Creseis acicula (Rang, 1828)

Synonyms
- Cleodora (Creseis) acicula Rang, 1828; Cleodora (Creseis) clava Rang, 1828; Cleodora acicula Rang, 1828; Cleodora clava Rang, 1828; Creseis acicula acicula (Rang, 1828); Creseis acicula f. clava (Rang, 1828); Creseis acus Eschscholtz, 1829; Creseis clava (Rang, 1828); Creseis recta (Gray, 1850); Creseis spiniformis Benoit, 1843; Creseis virgula clava (Rang, 1828); Dentalium ecostatum T. W. Kirk, 1880; Hyalaea aciculata [sic]

= Creseis acicula =

Species of mollusc

Creseis acicula is a species of pteropod, a distant type of sea-slug. It is in the family Creseidae.

== Description ==
Creseis acicula's size varies from 0.5–3.3 cm (0.2–1.3 in). It is described as a straight-needle pteropod, and has small wings at the top of its 'head'.

== Distribution ==
The species has a cosmopolitan distribution throughout the Caribbean, the Atlantic and Pacific oceans, the Mediterranean Sea and South America.

== Diet ==
The species feeds on small organisms such as diatoms, phytoplankton, archaea and larger protists.
