= Tibiella =

Tibiella may refer to:

- Tibiella (gastropod), a fossil genus of gastropods in the family Creseidae
- Tibiella (alga), a fossil genus of algae in the phylum Bacillariophyta
