= Clio cuspidata =

Scientific classification
- Kingdom: Animalia
- Phylum: Mollusca
- Class: Gastropoda
- Clade: Euopisthobranchia
- Order: Pteropoda
- Family: Cliidae
- Genus: Clio
- Species: C. cuspidata

Binomial name
- Clio cuspidata (Bosc, 1801)

Species of gastropod

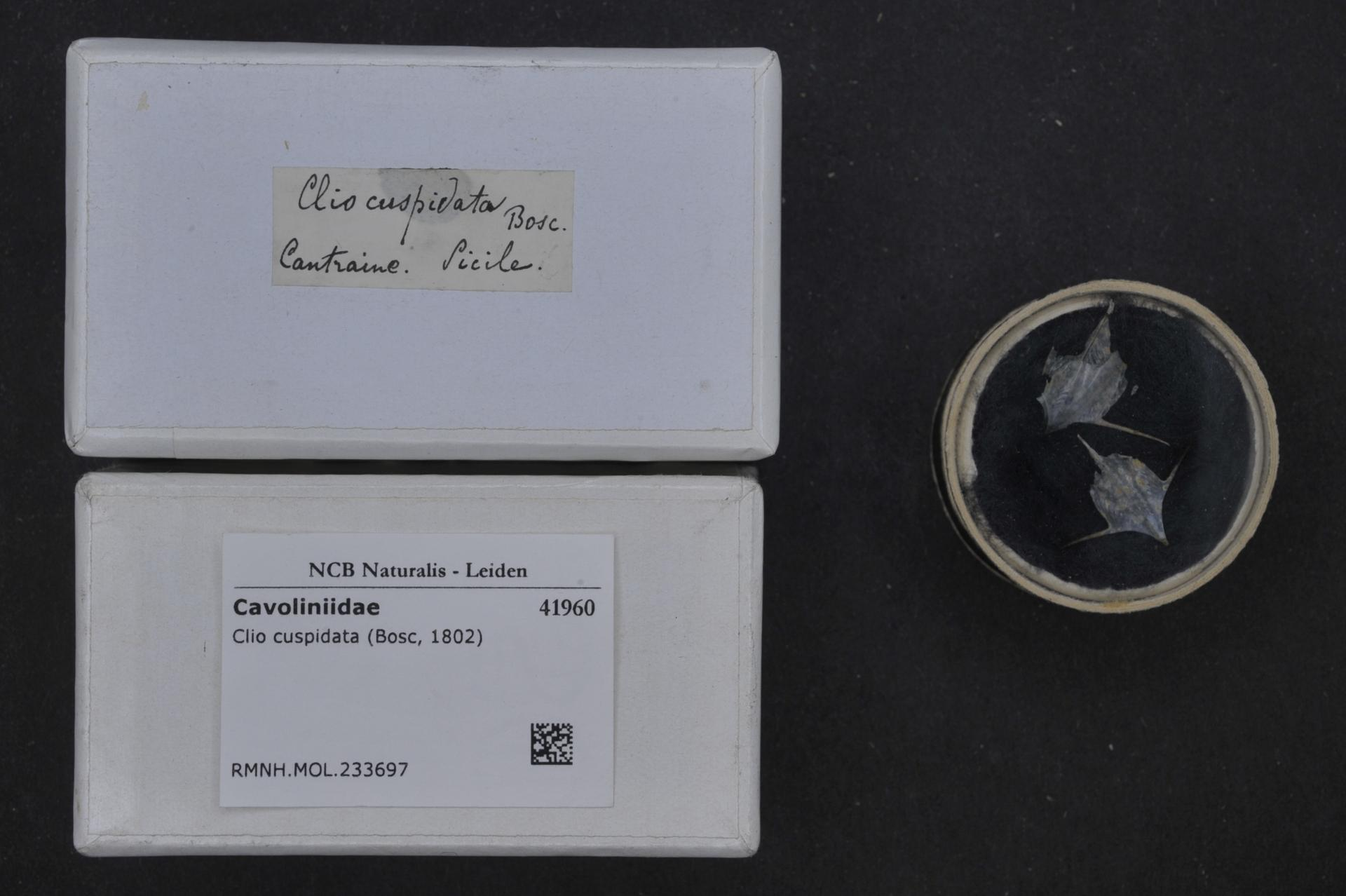
Scientific Analysis

Clio cuspidata is a species of gastropods belonging to the family Cliidae. It has small wings and a hard shell with a pointy tip. It is a pelagic species, living at a depth of 0-823m.

== Additional Information ==
The species has a cosmopolitan distribution, and mainly in subtropical climates. The most common areas to find it are the Western Atlantic, Western Central Pacific, and the Mediterranean Sea. They are suspension feeders, and mostly simultaneous hermaphrodites.
