= Diacavolinia longirostris =

Scientific classification
- Kingdom: Animalia
- Phylum: Mollusca
- Class: Gastropoda
- Clade: Euopisthobranchia
- Order: Pteropoda
- Family: Cavoliniidae
- Subfamily: Cavoliniinae
- Genus: Diacavolinia
- Species: D. longirostris

Binomial name
- Diacavolinia longirostris (Blainville, 1821)

Synonyms
- Cavolinia longirostris (Blainville, 1821); Cavolinia longirostris f. longirostris (Blainville, 1821); Hyalaea longirostris Blainville, 1821 (original combination)

Species of mollusc

Diacavolinia longirostris is a species of sea butterfly. It is a pteropod.

== Description ==
The species is a pelagic animal. It could live in deep waters, up to 1234m. The species has a small shell with big round 'wings' which it uses to swim and glide through the water. Its length attains 9 mm, its diameter 6.3 mm.

== Distribution ==
The species is mostly concentrated near Papua New Guinea, Australia, New Zealand and New Caledonia in the Oceanic region, in the Bay of Bengal and near the Gulf of Mexico, near Louisiana and the Bahamas.
