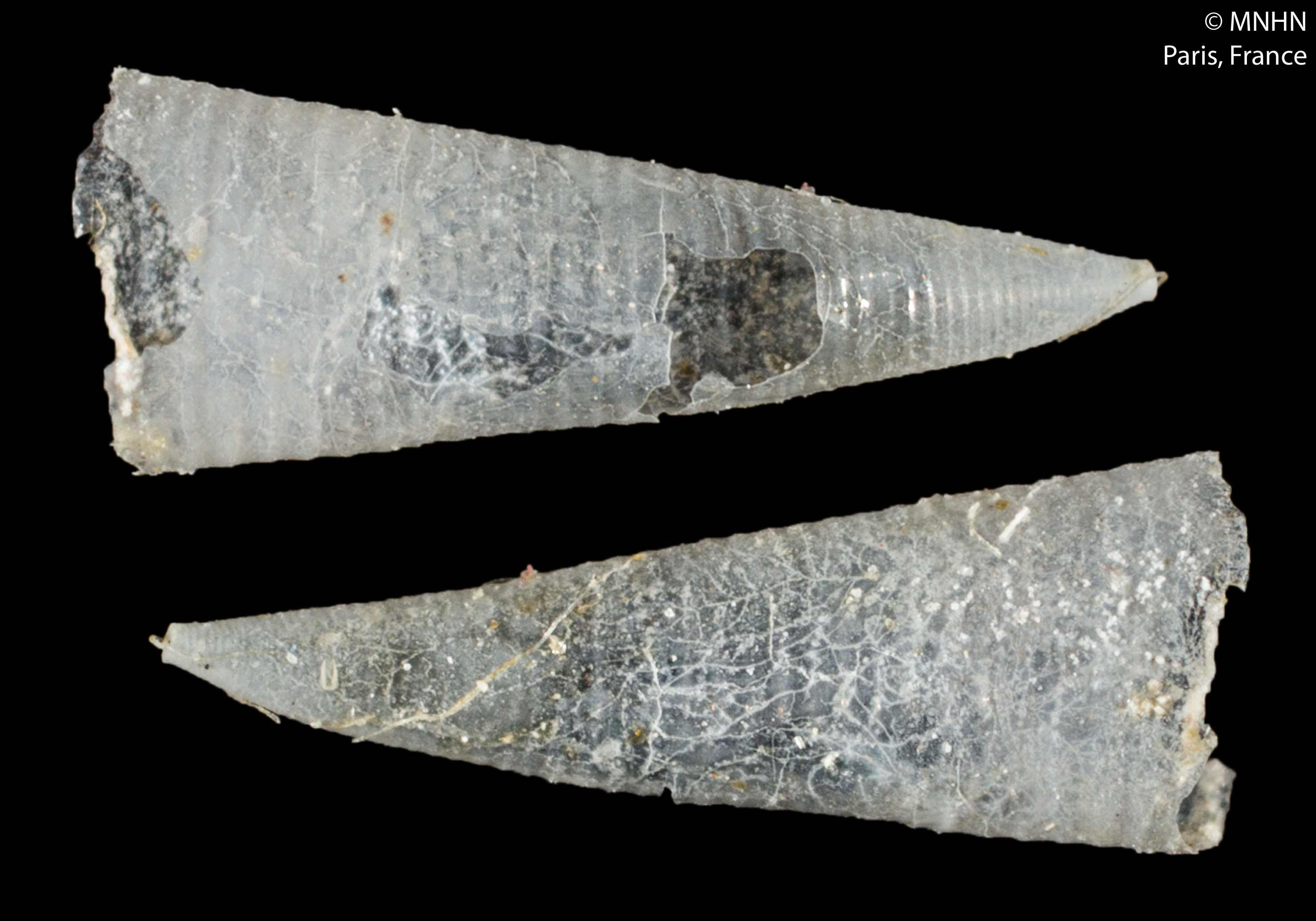
- Hyalocylis striata (syntype at MNHN)

Scientific classification
- Domain: Eukaryota
- Kingdom: Animalia
- Phylum: Mollusca
- Class: Gastropoda
- Clade: Euopisthobranchia
- Order: Pteropoda
- Suborder: Euthecosomata
- Superfamily: Cavolinioidea
- Family: Hyalocylidae; A. W. Janssen, 2020

= Hyalocylidae =

Family of gastropods

The family Hyalocylidae is a taxonomic group of small floating sea snails, pelagic marine opisthobranch gastropod mollusks.

== Genera ==
- Hyalocylis Fol, 1875
- † Praehyalocylis Korobkov, 1962

Synonyms

- Hyalocylix P. Fischer, 1883: synonym of Hyalocylis Fol, 1875 (unjustified emendation)
