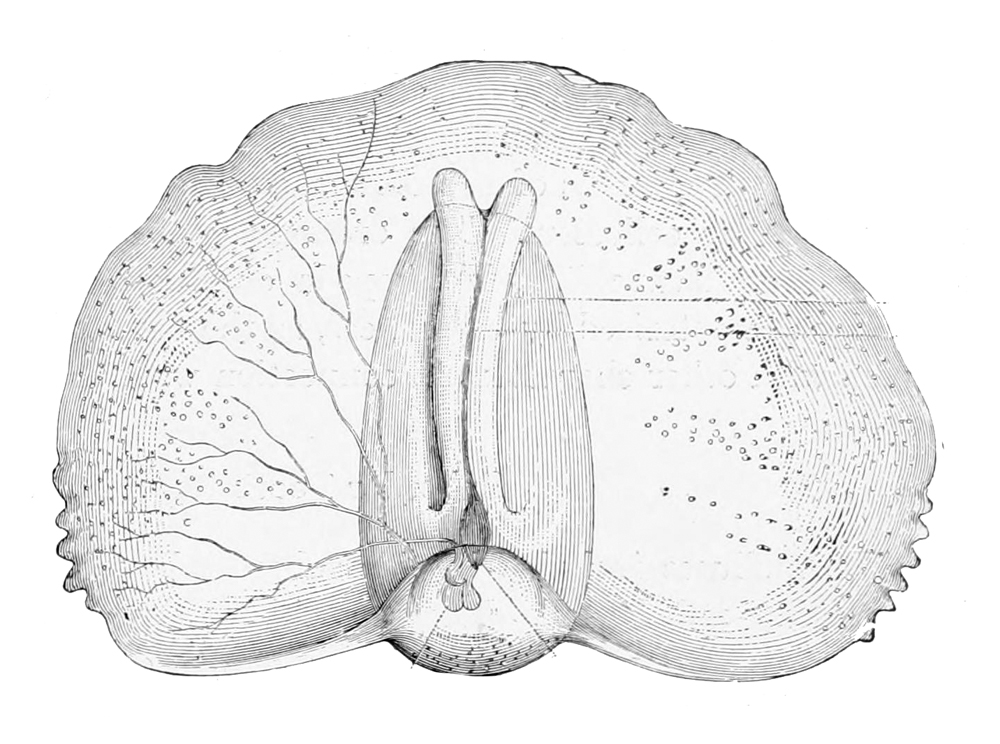
- Gleba cordata

Scientific classification
- Domain: Eukaryota
- Kingdom: Animalia
- Phylum: Mollusca
- Class: Gastropoda
- Clade: Euopisthobranchia
- Order: Pteropoda
- Suborder: Thecosomata
- Superfamily: Cymbulioidea; Gray, 1840

Families
- See text

Synonyms
- Pseudothecosomata

= Cymbulioidea =

Superfamily of gastropods

Cymbulioidea is a taxonomic superfamily of pelagic "sea butterflies", one group of swimming sea snails. They are holoplanktonic opisthobranch gastropod molluscs in the clade Thecosomata.

== Anatomy ==
Some groups within this superfamily possess a shell in the adult stage, some are without a shell in the adult stage, and others have developed a relatively tough gelatinous, cartilaginous internal structure, a sort of fake shell called the pseudoconch.

The lateral and posterior foot lobes are joined as a ciliated proboscis that leads to the mouth, and the wings are united ventrally to form a single plate.

A more general description is given under the entry sea butterfly.

== Taxonomy ==
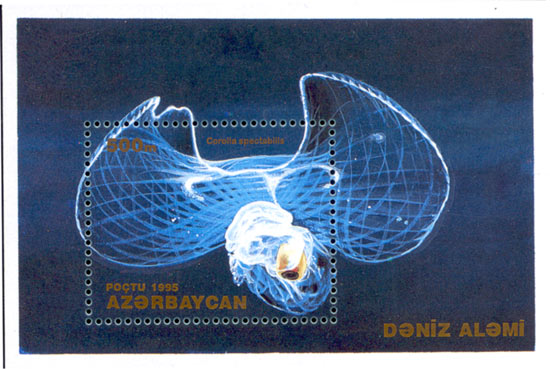
Corolla spectabilis on 1995 stamp of Azerbaijan.

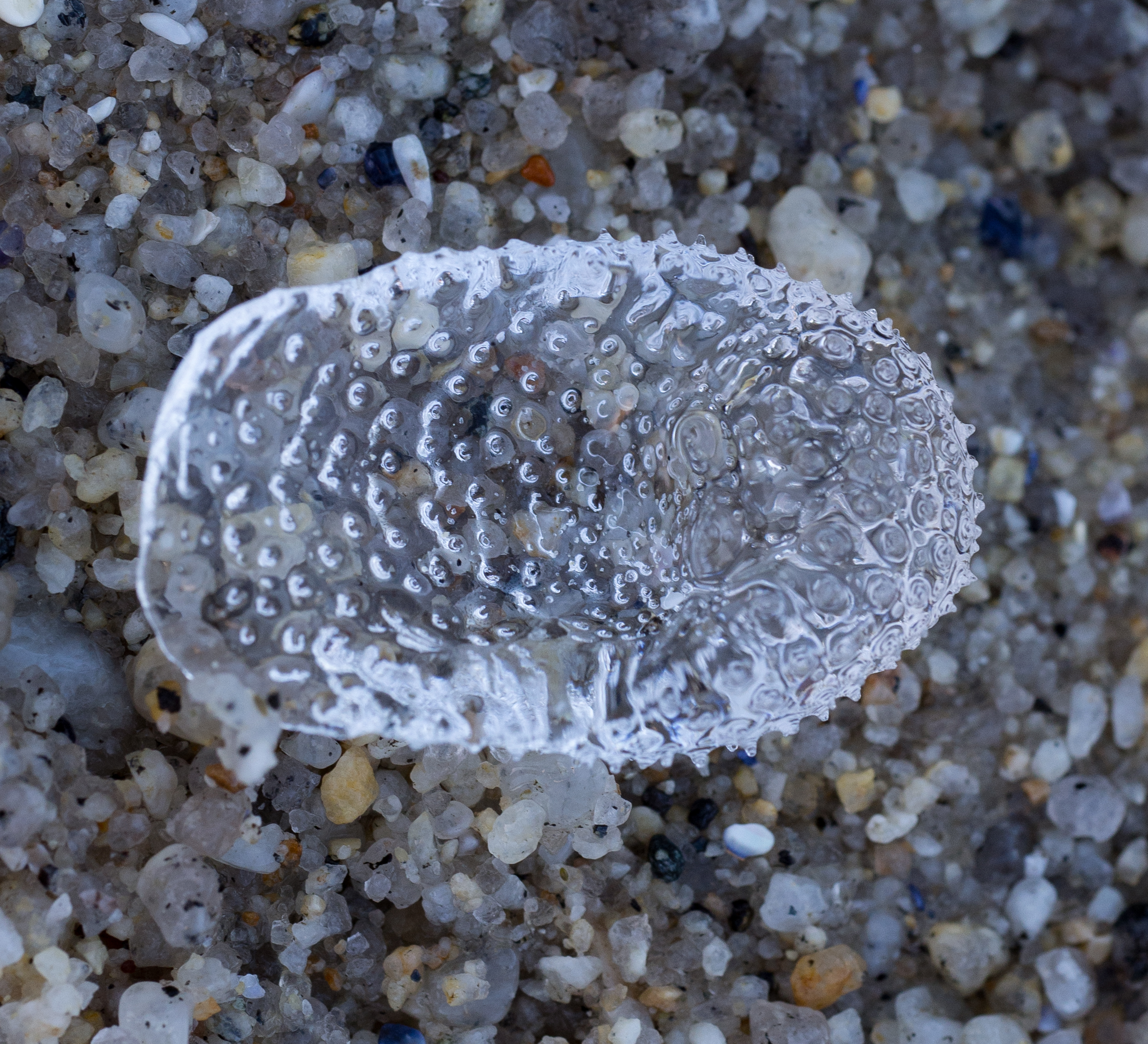
Sea butterfly pseudoconch

The group was originally referred to as the Pseudothecosomata Meisenheimer, 1905, although this name is invalid under the ICZN and thus is no longer recognized. Instead its three families are categorized within the superfamily Cymbulioidea, which is itself part of the clade Thecosomata.

The superfamily Cymbulioidea consists of three following families (according to the taxonomy of the Gastropoda by Bouchet & Rocroi, 2005):

- Family Peraclidae C. W. Johnson, 1915
  - Genus Peracle Forbes, 1844
- Family Cymbuliidae J.E. Gray, 1840
  - Genus Corolla Dall, 1871
  - Genus Cymbulia Peron & Lesueur, 1810
  - Genus Gleba Forsskål, 1776
- Family Desmopteridae (Dall, 1921)
  - Genus Desmopterus Chun, 1889
