= Cymbulia sibogae =

Cymbulia Sibogae

Scientific classification
- Kingdom: Animalia
- Phylum: Mollusca
- Class: Gastropoda
- Clade: Euopisthobranchia
- Order: Pteropoda
- Family: Cymbuliidae
- Genus: Cymbulia
- Species: C. sibogae

Binomial name
- Cymbulia sibogae B. Tesch, 1903

Species of pteropod

Cymbulia sibogae is a mollusk and species of pteropod.

== Distribution ==
The species was first recorded in Hawaii off the Kona Coast of the Big Island. It is a pelagic species that is rarely seen at night in off-shore waters. Currently, it is found in Big island, and Maui (Hawaii), as well as the south atlantic, near tropical areas of Brazil and Argentina, as well as the Indo Pacific. It lives in cold temperatures (-25/-30 °C) and approximately 80-90m in the ocean. In 2006 and 2014, there were recorded species living in the south gulf of Mexico.

== Description ==
Various sources dispute the size of this gastropod, however it can vary from 10mm to 2.4 cm. It is a transparent species with broad wings with a paddle-shaped pointed tail and a triangular cartilaginous pseudoconch.
