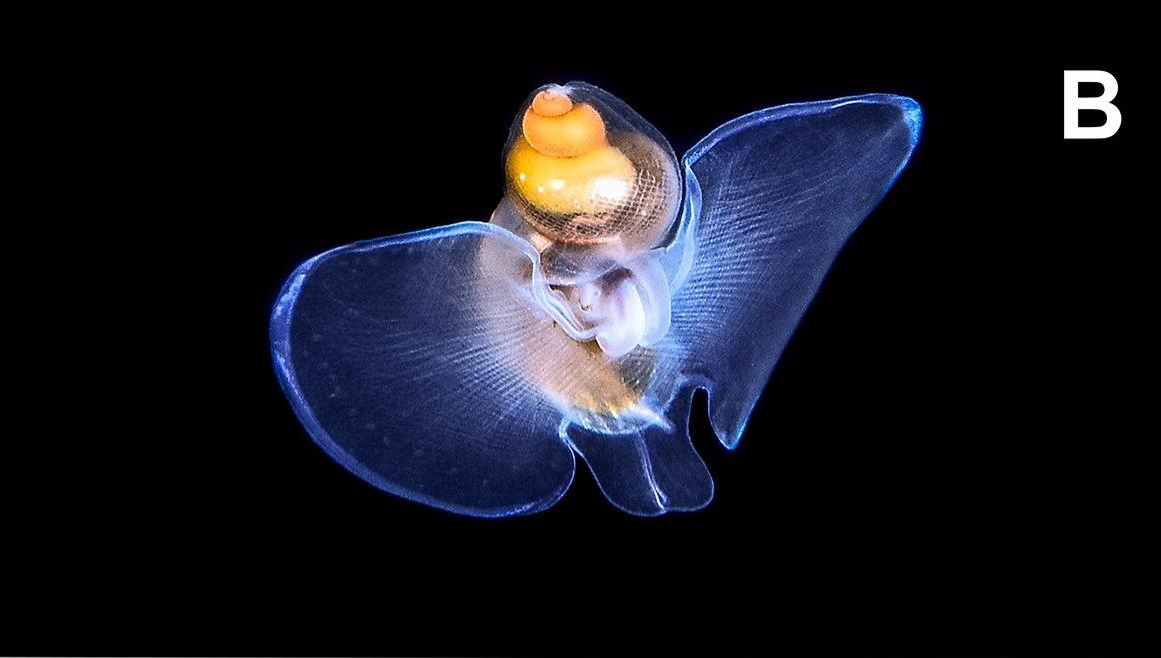
- Specimen from the Catalan coast

Scientific classification
- Kingdom: Animalia
- Phylum: Mollusca
- Class: Gastropoda
- Clade: Euopisthobranchia
- Order: Pteropoda
- Family: Peraclidae
- Genus: Peracle
- Species: P. reticulata

Binomial name
- Peracle reticulata (d'Orbigny, 1835)

Synonyms
- Peraclis reticulata

= Peracle reticulata =

Species of mollusc

Peracle reticulata is a species of Pteropoda, a form of sea snail.

== Distribution ==
The species lives in deep waters, approximately 900 meters below sea level. It lives in South African waters, near Antarctica and Reunion. It has been found to also live near the Canary Islands, the Andalusian Coast, Italy, Gibraltar and Greece, primarily concentrated in the sheer mediterranean.

== Anatomy ==
The species has a small shell and "wings" to swim around.
