= Desmopteridae =

Scientific classification
- Kingdom: Animalia
- Phylum: Mollusca
- Class: Gastropoda
- Clade: Euopisthobranchia
- Order: Pteropoda
- Superfamily: Cymbulioidea
- Family: Desmopteridae; Chun, 1889

Family of gastropods

Desmopteridae is a family of pelagic sea snails or "sea butterflies", marine gastropod mollusks in the superfamily Cymbulioidea.

This family has no subfamilies (according to the taxonomy of the Gastropoda by Bouchet & Rocroi, 2005).

Desmopterus Chun, 1889 is the type genus of the family Desmopteridae.

The species are protandric hermaphrodites. There is no shell, no protoconch and no longer any supporting tissue. The body consists almost completely of the two big parapodia (winglike flaps).

== Species ==
Species within the genus Desmopterus include:

- Desmopterus cirropterus Gegenbaur, 1855
- Desmopterus gardineri Tesch, 1910 - Distribution: Indian Ocean.
- Desmopterus pacificus Essenberg, 1919 - Distribution: California, Oceanic. Description: shorter wing plate tentacles.
- Desmopterus papilio Chun, 1889 Distribution: Seychelles, Florida, Bermuda, Venezuela, Brazil, Adriatic Sea, tropical and subtropical oceanic waters. Length: body length between 0.5 – 2.0 mm, swimming wings between 2.0- 4.0 mm. Description: There is no shell. The animal has wings that are disc-shaped and transparent. The body is large and situated centrally between the lateral wings. These can unite to form a plate with on each side long, ciliated tentacles trailing behind. Most of the time, Desmopterus papilio hangs motionless, but flaps away in a loop pattern when disturbed. There are reddish-brown spots at the margin of the wings.
