= Cuvierina =

Scientific classification
- Domain: Eukaryota
- Kingdom: Animalia
- Phylum: Mollusca
- Class: Gastropoda
- Clade: Euopisthobranchia
- Order: Pteropoda
- Family: Cuvierinidae
- Genus: Cuvierina; Boas, 1886

Genus of gastropods

Cuvierina is a genus of gastropods belonging to the family Cuvierinidae.

The genus has almost cosmopolitan distribution.

Species:

- Cuvierina astesana (Rang, 1829)
- Cuvierina atlantica Bé, MacClintock & Currie, 1972
- Cuvierina cancapae A.W.Janssen, 2005
- Cuvierina columnella (Rang, 1827)
- Cuvierina curryi A.W.Janssen, 2005
- Cuvierina inflata (Bellardi, 1873)
- Cuvierina intermedia (Bellardi, 1873)
- Cuvierina jagti A.W.Janssen, 1995
- Cuvierina ludbrooki (Caprotti, 1962)
- Cuvierina pacifica A.W.Janssen, 2005
- Cuvierina paronai Checchia-Rispoli, 1921
- Cuvierina torpedo (P.Marshall, 1918)
- Cuvierina tsudai Burridge, A.W.Janssen & Peijnenburg, 2016
- Cuvierina urceolaris (Mörch, 1850)
