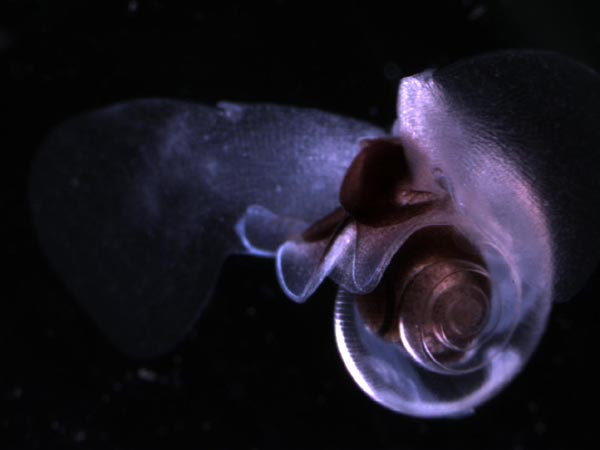
- Limacina helicina

Scientific classification
- Kingdom: Animalia
- Phylum: Mollusca
- Class: Gastropoda
- Clade: Euopisthobranchia
- Order: Pteropoda
- Suborder: Thecosomata; Blainville, 1824

Families
- Limacinidae; Cavoliniidae; Cliidae; Creseidae; Cuvierinidae; Praecuvierinidae; Peraclididae; Cymbuliidae; Desmopteridae

= Sea butterfly =

Sea butterflies Temporal range: Late Paleocene–recent

Suborder of molluscs

The Thecosomata (collective/plural: thecosomes, from Ancient Greek θήκη (thḗkē), meaning "case", and σῶμα (sôma), meaning "body"), or sea butterflies, are a taxonomic suborder of small, pelagic, free-swimming sea snails known as holoplanktonic opisthobranch gastropod mollusks, in the order Pteropoda (also included within the informal group Opisthobranchia). Most pteropods have some form of calcified shell, although it is often very light, even translucent.

The sea butterflies include some of the world's most abundant gastropod species; as their large numbers are an essential part of the ocean food chain, they are a significant contributor to the oceanic carbon cycle.

== Morphology ==
Unlike other sea snails, or even land snails, sea butterflies float and swim freely through the ocean, traveling along with the currents. This has led to a number of evolutionary adaptations in their bodies, including complete or near-complete loss of the shell and the gill in several families. Their gastropodal foot has also taken the form of two wing-like lobes, or parapodia, which propel the animal through the sea by slow flapping movements.

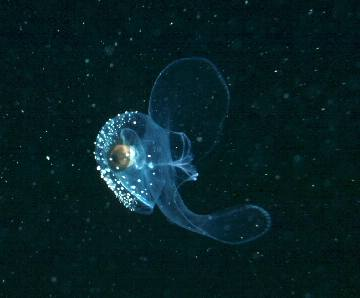
Unidentified thecosome

Most thecosomes have some form of calcified shell, although often very light. They are rather difficult to see, since their shell, if present, is mostly transparent, fragile, and usually tiny (less than 1 cm in length). Although their shell may be so fine as to be transparent, it is nevertheless calcareous, and an important part of the oceanic calcium cycle. Their shells are bilaterally symmetric and can vary widely in shape, ranging from coiled or needle-like to triangular or globular.

The shell is present in all life cycle stages of the Cavolinioidea (Euthecosomata). In the Cymbulioidea (Pseudothecosomata), adult Peraclididae also bear shells; the Cymbuliidae shed their larval shells and develop a cartilaginous pseudoconch in adulthood. Only the Desmopteridae lack any rigid covering when mature.

== Behavior and distribution ==
=== Swimming kinematics ===
Molluscan pteropods develop their feet into a pair of wing-like parapodia in the growing phase. These 'wings' are highly flexible, as the orientation of the muscles is different, and they have a hydrostatic skeleton filled with a pressurized fluid. Thus, the high bending-angle supports the parapodia to diminish the drag forces generated by the classic "clap-and-fling" maneuver; additionally, it aids in carrying the extra weight of a shell and ascending the water column for the diel vertical migration.

The power-stroke for L. helicina starts with a sharp rotation of it is body accompanied by an increase in swimming speed; it then rotates its shell in the opposite direction to initiate the recovery-stroke and swims upward, with a speed less than the power phase. There is a drop in overall speed between power and recovery strokes, which develop a sawtooth trajectory in the sagittal plane. The hyper-pitch of the round shell of L. helicina diminishes the rotational drag and the moment of inertia; the extreme shell rotation also assists in raising the wingtips at the end of each stroke to create a figure-eight pattern, common for flying insects. In contrast, flying insects and shell-less pteropods encounter higher resistance forces that limit the body rotation.

Sea butterflies range from the tropics to the poles. They are "holoplanktonic"—they spend all their lives floating amongst plankton, rather than remaining planktonic during their larval stage. (Note: Compare the sea butterflies unusual whole-life residence in the plankton with the more common behavior of most other marine gastropods, whose veliger larvae are part of the meroplankton, but who leave the plankton once they reach adult form.) Thus, thecosomans are most common in the top 25 metres (82 ft) of the ocean—in terms of diversity, species richness, and abundance—and become scarcer with increased depth.

Occasionally, thecosomans swarm in large numbers, and can sometimes be found washed ashore in flotsam, especially along the coastline of eastern Australia.

=== Diurnal vertical migration ===
Thecosomata beat their wing-like parapodia to "fly" through the water. When descending to deeper water, they hold their wings up.

They migrate vertically from day to night, so the community structure changes on a 24 hour cycle; during the day many organisms take refuge at water depths in excess of 100 m.

=== Feeding ===
Little is documented of the dietary habits or behaviour of sea butterflies, yet they are known to have a peculiar way of feeding. Being generally herbivorous, and mostly passive plankton-feeders, they live their lives according to the currents and find food by floating ventral-side up; some may more actively forage, at times. They feed secreting a fine mucus web to capture the plankton and organic particles suspended in water columns. Measuring up to 5 cm wide—many times larger than their own bodies. If disturbed, they simply abandon the web and flap slowly away.

Each day, they embark on a regular diel vertical migration through the water column in their pursuit of planktonic prey. At night, they forage at the surface and return to deeper waters by the morning.

== Fossil record ==
Geologically-speaking, Thecosomata is a rather young group, being known from the Late Paleocene of the Cenozoic Era.

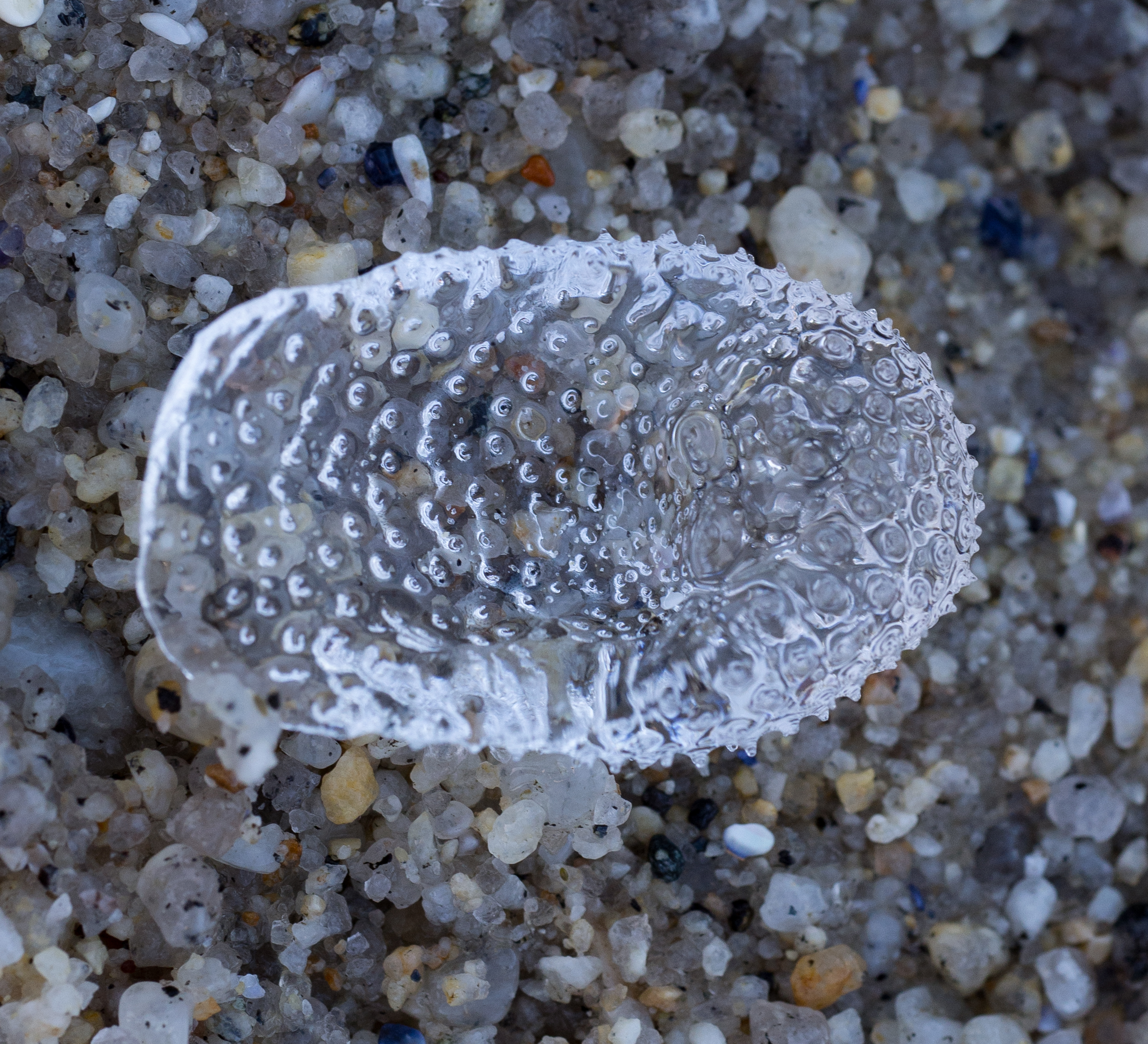
Sea butterfly pseudoconch

The group is known within the fossil record from shells of those groups within the clade that mineralized. These carbonate shells are a major contributor to the oceanic carbon cycle, making up as much as 12% of global carbonate flux. However, the low stability of their aragonitic shells means that few end up being preserved within sediments as viable fossils; rather, they are mostly deposited in shallow, tropical seas.

== Importance in the food chain ==
These creatures, which range from lentil- to orange-sized, are eaten by various marine species, including a wide variety of fish that are, in turn, consumed by penguins and polar bears. The sea butterflies form the sole food source of their relatives, the Gymnosomata. They are also consumed by sea birds, whales, and commercially important fish. However, if sea butterflies are consumed in large quantities fish can get "black gut", which makes them unsellable.

== Taxonomy ==
Along with its sister group, the sea angels (Gymnosomata), the sea butterflies (Thecosomata) are included in the order Pteropoda. The validity of the pteropod order is not universally accepted; it fell out of favour for a number of years, but recent molecular evidence suggests that the taxon should be revived. Although most Thecosomata have some form of calcified shell, mature Gymnosomata have none.

=== Ponder & Lindberg ===
Order Thecosomata de Blainville, 1824

- Infraorder Euthecosomata
  - Superfamily Limacinoidea
    - Family Limacinidae de Blainville, 1823
  - Superfamily Cavolinioidea
    - Family Cavoliniidae H. and A. Adams, 1854
    - Family Cliidae
    - Family Creseidae
    - Family Cuvierinidae
    - Family Praecuvierinidae
- Infraorder Pseudothecosomata
  - Superfamily Peraclidoidea
    - Family Peraclidae Tesch, 1913
  - Superfamily Cymbulioidea
    - Family Cymbuliidae Gray, 1840
    - Family Desmopteridae Dall, 1921

=== Bouchet & Rocroi ===
In the new taxonomy of Bouchet & Rocroi (2005) Thecosomata is treated differently :

Clade Thecosomata :

- Superfamily Cavolinioidea Gray, 1850 ( = Euthecosomata)
  - Family Cavoliniidae Gray, 1850 (1815)
    - Subfamily Cavoliinae Gray, 1850 (1815) (formerly Hyalaeidae Rafinesque, 1815 )
    - Subfamily Clioinae Jeffreys, 1869 (formerly Cleodoridae Gray, 1840 - nomen oblitum)
    - Subfamily Cuvierininae van der Spoel, 1967 (formerly : Cuvieriidae Gray, 1840 (nom. inv.); Tripteridae Gray, 1850 )
    - Subfamily Creseinae Curry, 1982
  - Family Limacinidae Gray, 1840 (formerly : Spirialidae Chenu, 1859 ; Spiratellidae Dall, 1921 )
  - † Family Sphaerocinidae A. Janssen & Maxwell, 1995
- Superfamily Cymbulioidea Gray, 1840 ( = Pseudothecosomata)
  - Family Cymbuliidae Gray, 1840
    - Subfamily Cymbuliinae Gray, 1840
    - Subfamily Glebinae van der Spoel, 1976
  - Family Desmopteridae Chun, 1889
  - Family Peraclidae Tesch, 1913 (formerly Procymbuliidae Tesch, 1913

Bouchet & Rocroi (2005) move the family Limacinidae into the superfamily Cavolinioidea, making redundant the superfamily Limacinoidea erected for it in Ponder & Lindberg's taxonomy. The families Creseidae and Cuvierinidae are demoted to subfamilies of Cavoliniidae (Creseinae and Cuvierininae). The infraorder Pseudothecosomata becomes the superfamily Cymbulioidea. The family Peraclididae is included in the superfamily Cymbulioidea as the family Peraclidae, making the superfamily Peraclidoidea redundant.

== See also ==
- Ocean acidification
- Clione antarctica

== Sources ==
- Bé, A.W.H.; Gilmer, R.W. (1977). "A zoogeographic and taxonomic review of euthecosomatous pteropoda". In Ramsey, A.T.S. (ed.). Oceanic Micropaleontology. Vol. 1. London, UK: Academic Press. pp. 733–808.
- van der Spoel, S. (1967). Euthecosomata, a group with remarkable developmental stages (Gastropoda, Pteropoda) (Thesis). University of Amsterdam. "Gorinchem (J. Noorduijn)"
- van der Spoel, S. (1976). Pseudothecosomata, Gymnosomata, and Heteropoda (Gastropoda). Utrecht: Bohn, Scheltema & Holkema.
- [no author cited] (2003). "Regarding the raising of ranks". Cainozoic Research. 2 (1–2): 163–170.
- "Sea Butterfly". Our Breathing Planet. Archived from the original on 12 October 2016.
