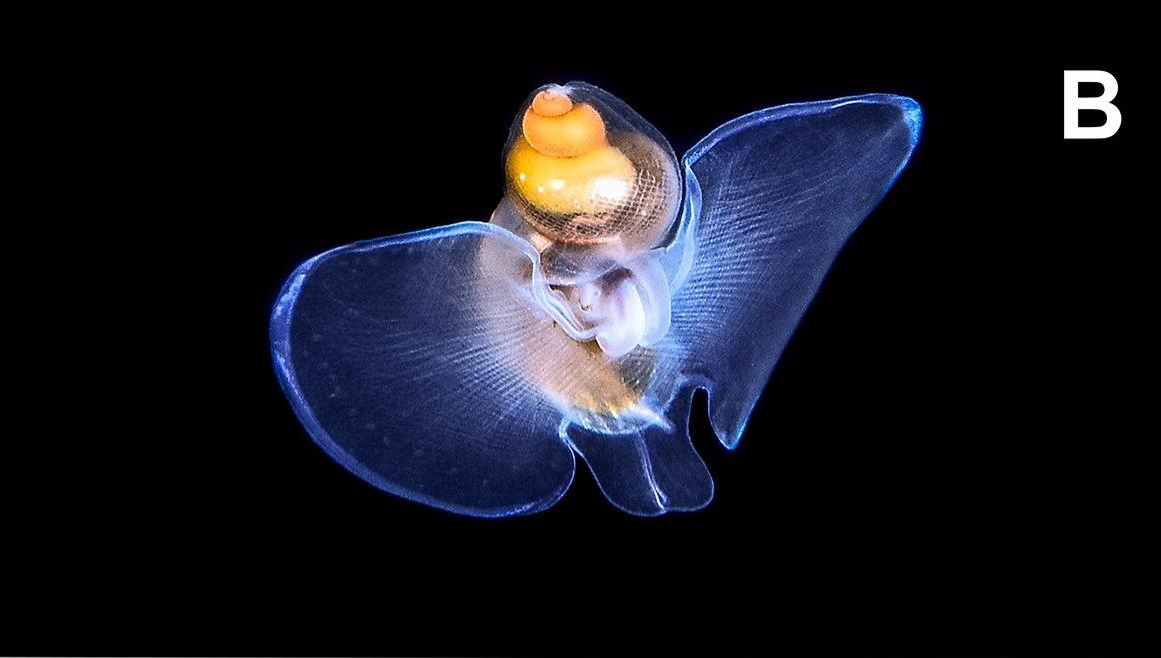
- Peracle reticulata, from the Catalan coast

Scientific classification
- Kingdom: Animalia
- Phylum: Mollusca
- Class: Gastropoda
- Clade: Euopisthobranchia
- Order: Pteropoda
- Superfamily: Cymbulioidea
- Family: Peraclidae; Tesch, 1913

Synonyms
- Procymbuliidae, 1913

= Peraclidae =

Family of sea snails

Peraclidae is a family of pelagic sea snails or "sea butterflies", marine gastropod molluscs in the superfamily Cymbulioidea.

This family has no subfamilies (according to the taxonomy of the Gastropoda by Bouchet & Rocroi, 2005).

This family was originally called Procymbuliidae Tesch, 1913 and then called Peraclididae by Wenz in 1938. The name Peraclidae takes precedence.

Peracle is the type genus of the family Peraclidae.

"Peraclis" Pelseener, 1888 is a unjustied modification (Giovine, F. 1988)

== Description ==
The left-coiled shell resembles the shell of most snails. The columella is somewhat elongated into a curved rostrum. There is an operculum and a gill.

== Species ==
Species within the genus Peracle Forbes, 1844 include:

- † Peracle charlotteae Janssen & Little, 2010
- Peracle depressa Meisenheimer, 1906 - Distribution: Cuba, Brazil, Argentina, Oceanic, Equatorial Atlantic.
- Peracle diversa (Monterosato, 1875) - synonyms: Peracle apicifulva Meisenheimer, 1906,
- Peracle bispinosa Pelseneer, 1888, Two-spine pteropod. Distribution: Florida, Bermuda, Cuba, Argentina, Mediterranean. Length: 4 mm.
- Peracle moluccensis Tesch, 1903 - Distribution: Panama, Brazil, British Isles, Oceanic. Length: 3 mm.
- Peracle philiporum (R. W. Gilmer, 1990) - Distribution: Bahamas. Length: 4.5 mm.
- Peracle reticulata (d'Orbigny, 1836) - Reticulate pteropod. Distribution: Oceanic, Florida, Texas; Mediterranean. Length: 6 mm. Description: the shell, which shows a hexagonal pattern, is rather heavy and compels this little animal to flap continuously to keep afloat. Table 4, figure 2
- Peracle triacantha (P. Fischer, 1882) - Distribution: Oceanic, Cuba, Bermuda, Venezuela, Mediterranean. Length: 5 mm
- Peracle valdiviae Meisenheimer 1905 - Distribution: Oceanic, Argentina. Length: 5 mm.
