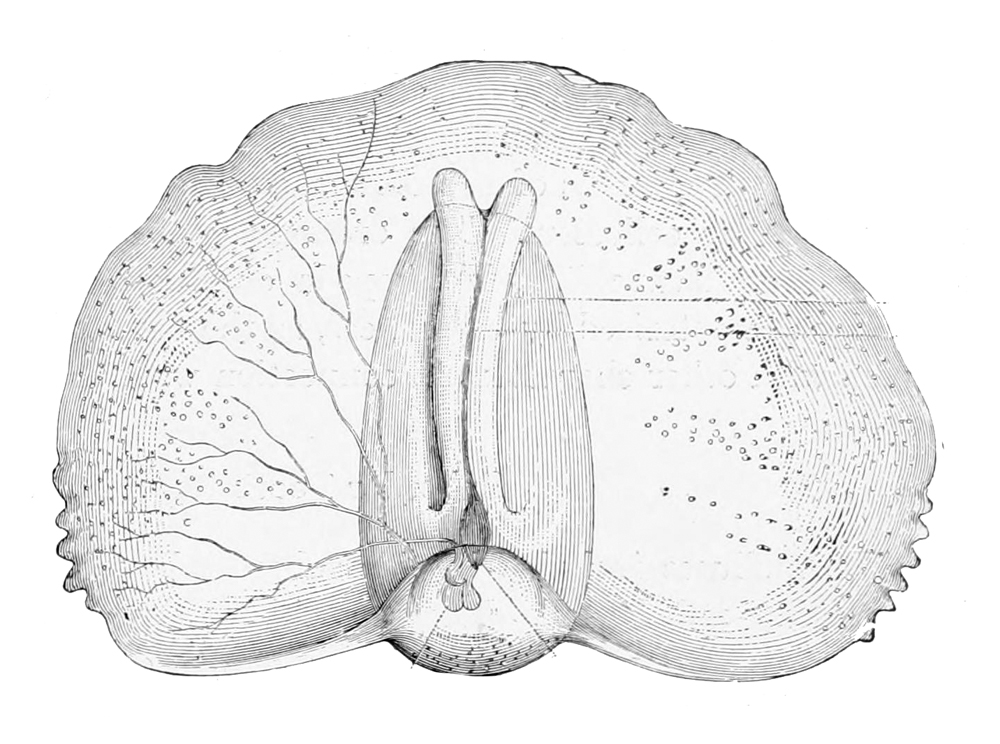
- Gleba cordata

Scientific classification
- Domain: Eukaryota
- Kingdom: Animalia
- Phylum: Mollusca
- Class: Gastropoda
- Clade: Euopisthobranchia
- Order: Pteropoda
- Superfamily: Cymbulioidea
- Family: Cymbuliidae; Gray, 1840

= Cymbuliidae =

Family of gastropods

Cymbuliidae is a family of pelagic sea snails or "sea butterflies", marine gastropod mollusks in the superfamily Cymbulioidea.

== Description ==
Instead of an external calcareous shell, they possess a pseudoconch, consisting of conchiolin, a cartilaginous tissue. The mantle and the gill have disappeared as well. They breathe through the skin. They prefer warm water.

== Distribution ==
Cymbuliidae are found in all marine waters between -54 and 55°N.

== Subfamilies ==
The family Cymbuliidae consists of two following subfamilies (according to the taxonomy of the Gastropoda by Bouchet & Rocroi, 2005):

- subfamily Cymbuliinae Gray, 1840
- subfamily Glebinae van der Spoel, 1976

== Genera ==
Genera within the family Cymbuliidae include:

subfamily Cymbuliinae

- Cymbulia Péron & Lesueur, 1810 - type genus of the family Cymbuliidae
  - Cymbulia parvidentata Pelseneer, 1888 - Distribution: Bermuda, Oceanic. Length: 35 mm.
  - Cymbulia peronii Lamarck, 1819 - Distribution: Florida, Mexico, Brazil, Argentina, Oceanic. Length: 65 mm.
  - Cymbulia sibogae Tesch, 1903 - Distribution: Brazil, Argentina, Oceanic. Length: 24 mm.
- Corolla Dall, 1871

subfamily Glebinae

- Gleba Forsskål, 1776 - type genus of the subfamily Glebinae
  - Gleba chrysosticta Troschel, 1854: synonym of Corolla chrysosticta (Troschel, 1854)
  - Gleba cordata Forskål, 1776 - Distribution: Florida, Bermuda, Oceanic. Length: 45 mm.
