= Cliidae =

Scientific classification
- Kingdom: Animalia
- Phylum: Mollusca
- Class: Gastropoda
- Clade: Euopisthobranchia
- Order: Pteropoda
- Superfamily: Cavolinioidea
- Family: Cliidae; Jeffreys, 1869

Synonyms
- Tripteridae (declared nomen oblitum by Bouchet & Rocroi (2005))

Family of gastropods

The family Cliidae is a taxonomic group of small floating sea snails, pelagic marine opisthobranch gastropod molluscs.

This family name has for a long time been known as Clioidae, or the subfamily Clioinae Jeffreys, 1869 belonging to the family Cavoliniidae, each time with the type genus Clio Linnaeus, 1767. Unfortunately this is often confused with another molluscan family Clionidae, which has the type genus Clione. The International Commission on Zoological Nomenclature (ICZN) has therefore changed the name back to its original spelling Cliidae Jeffreys, 1869, type genus Clio Linnaeus, 1767

== Genera ==
- Clio Linnaeus, 1767

Genera brought into synonymy

- Balantium Children, 1823: synonym of Clio (Balantium) Children, 1823 represented as Clio Linnaeus, 1767
- Cleodora Peron & Lesueur, 1810: synonym of Clio Linnaeus, 1767
- Euclio Bonnevie, 1912: synonym of Clio Linnaeus, 1767
