= Euthecosomata =

Scientific classification
- Kingdom: Animalia
- Phylum: Mollusca
- Class: Gastropoda
- Subterclass: Tectipleura
- Clade: Euopisthobranchia
- Order: Pteropoda
- Suborder: Euthecosomata; Meisenheimer, 1905

Suborder of molluscs

Euthecosomata is a taxonomic unit used to classify sea snails. It is a suborder of the order Pteropoda.

== Superfamilies ==
- Cavolinioidea Gray, 1850 (1815)
- Limacinoidea Gray, 1840
