= Cuvierinidae =

Scientific classification
- Kingdom: Animalia
- Phylum: Mollusca
- Class: Gastropoda
- Clade: Euopisthobranchia
- Order: Pteropoda
- Superfamily: Cavolinioidea
- Family: Cuvierinidae

Family of gastropods

Cuvierinidae is a family of gastropods belonging to the order Pteropoda.

Genera:

- Cuvierina Boas, 1886
- †Ireneia Janssen, 1995
- † Johnjagtia A. W. Janssen, 2005
- † Spoelia A. W. Janssen, 1990

Taxon inquirendum

- Triptera Quoy & Gaimard, 1835

Synonyms

- Cuvieria Rang, 1827: synonym of Cuvierina Boas, 1886 (invalid: junior homonym of Cuvieria Lesueur & Petit, 1807; Herse, Hyperia, Cuvierina and Rangistela are replacement names)
- Herse Gistel, 1848: synonym of Cuvierina Boas, 1886 (substitute name for Cuvieria Rang, 1827; invalid: junior homonym of Herse Hawle & Corda, 1847 [Trilobita])
- Hyperia Gistel, 1848: synonym of Cuvierina Boas, 1886 (Invalid: junior homonym of Hyperia Latreille, 1829 [Crustacea])
- Rangistela Pruvot-Fol, 1948: synonym of Cuvierina Boas, 1886
- Tripteris [sic]: synonym of Cuvierina Boas, 1886
