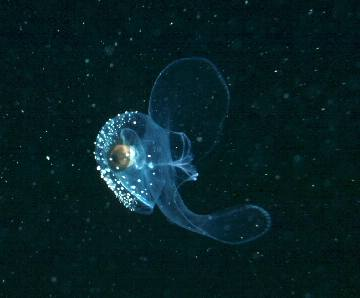
- An unidentified sea butterfly

Scientific classification
- Kingdom: Animalia
- Phylum: Mollusca
- Class: Gastropoda
- Clade: Euopisthobranchia
- Order: Pteropoda
- Suborder: Euthecosomata
- Superfamily: Cavolinioidea (Gray, 1850)

Families
- Family Cavoliniidae; Family Cliidae; Family Creseidae; Family Cuvierinidae; Family Hyalocylidae; † Family Praecuvierinidae; † Family Sphaerocinidae

= Cavolinioidea =

Superfamily of gastropods

The superfamily Cavolinioidea is the most speciose group of sea butterflies. They belong to the suborder Euthecosomata.

Sea butterflies (thecosomata) are pelagic marine gastropods, so called because they swim by flapping their wing-like parapodia.

== Distribution ==
These sea butterflies are circumglobal, carried by the sea currents to all the seas of the world.

== Habitat ==
Cavoliniids prefer deep waters, from 100 m up to 2,000 m. They do best in warm oceanic water.

== Shell description ==
Species in this superfamily have a calcareous, bilaterally symmetrical conical or globular shell. Identification of juveniles is difficult as the juvenile shells differ greatly from adults.

== Life habits ==
Towards the anterior end of the animal, two parapodia (winglike flat lobules) protrude between each half of the shell. The parapodia enable these sea butterflies to float along in the water currents, using slow flapping movements. The parapodia are also covered with cilia, which produce a minute water current that pushes the planktonic food to the mouth of the animal.

== Reproduction ==
Cavoliniids have a strange sexual life. They develop from males as juveniles into hermaphrodites and then later convert into females. More than one male stage can occur. This bizarre-seeming, but not very uncommon phenomenon is called protandry. (This is also common among many species of fish, some may all start as females, others species may start as males.)

== Taxonomy ==
In 2003, the family Cavoliniidae was raised to the rank of superfamily Cavolinioidea. At the same time, the subfamilies were given the new status of families: Cavoliniidae, Cliidae, Creseidae and Cuvierinidae (Cainozoic Research, 2(1-2): 163-170, 2003).

=== 2005 taxonomy ===
In the taxonomy of Bouchet & Rocroi (2005) several families have been categorized as subfamilies of the family Cavoliniidae and the superfamily Cavolinioidea is treated like this:

- Family Cavoliniidae Gray, 1850 (1815)
  - Subfamily Cavoliinae Gray, 1850 (1815) - formerly Hyalaeidae Rafinesque, 1815
- Family Cliidae Jeffreys, 1869 - formerly Cleodoridae Gray, 1840 - nomen oblitum
- Family Creseidae Rampal, 1973 - formerly subfamily Creseinae Curry, 1982
- Family Cuvierinidae van der Spoel, 1967 - formerly subfamily Cuvierininae van der Spoel, 1967
- † Family Sphaerocinidae A. Janssen & Maxwell, 1995

In 2005 a new family Praecuvierinidae Janssen, 2005 was created on evolutionary grounds.

In 2020 a new family Hyalocylidae A. W. Janssen, 2020 was added.

Families brought into synonymy

- Cleodoridae Gray, 1840: synonym of Cavoliniidae Gray, 1850 (1815)
- Clioidae Jeffreys, 1869: synonym of Cliidae Jeffreys, 1869 (incorrect subsequent spelling)
- Hyalaeidae Rafinesque, 1815: synonym of Cavoliniidae Gray, 1850 (1815)
- Tripteridae Gray, 1850: synonym of Cliidae Jeffreys, 1869
