= Creseidae =

Scientific classification
- Domain: Eukaryota
- Kingdom: Animalia
- Phylum: Mollusca
- Class: Gastropoda
- Clade: Euopisthobranchia
- Order: Pteropoda
- Superfamily: Cavolinioidea
- Family: Creseidae

Family of gastropods

Creseidae is a family of gastropods belonging to the order Pteropoda.

Genera:

- Boasia Dall, 1889
- † Bovicornu Meyer, 1886
- † Bowdenatheca R. L. Collins, 1934 †
- † Bucanoides Hodgkinson, 1992
- † Camptoceratops Wenz, 1923
- † Cheilospicata Hodgkinson, 1992
- Creseis Rang, 1828
- † Euchilotheca Fischer, 1882
- † Loxobidens Hodgkinson, 1992
- Styliola Gray, 1847
- † Thecopsella Munier-Chalmas, 1888
- Tibiella Meyer, 1884
