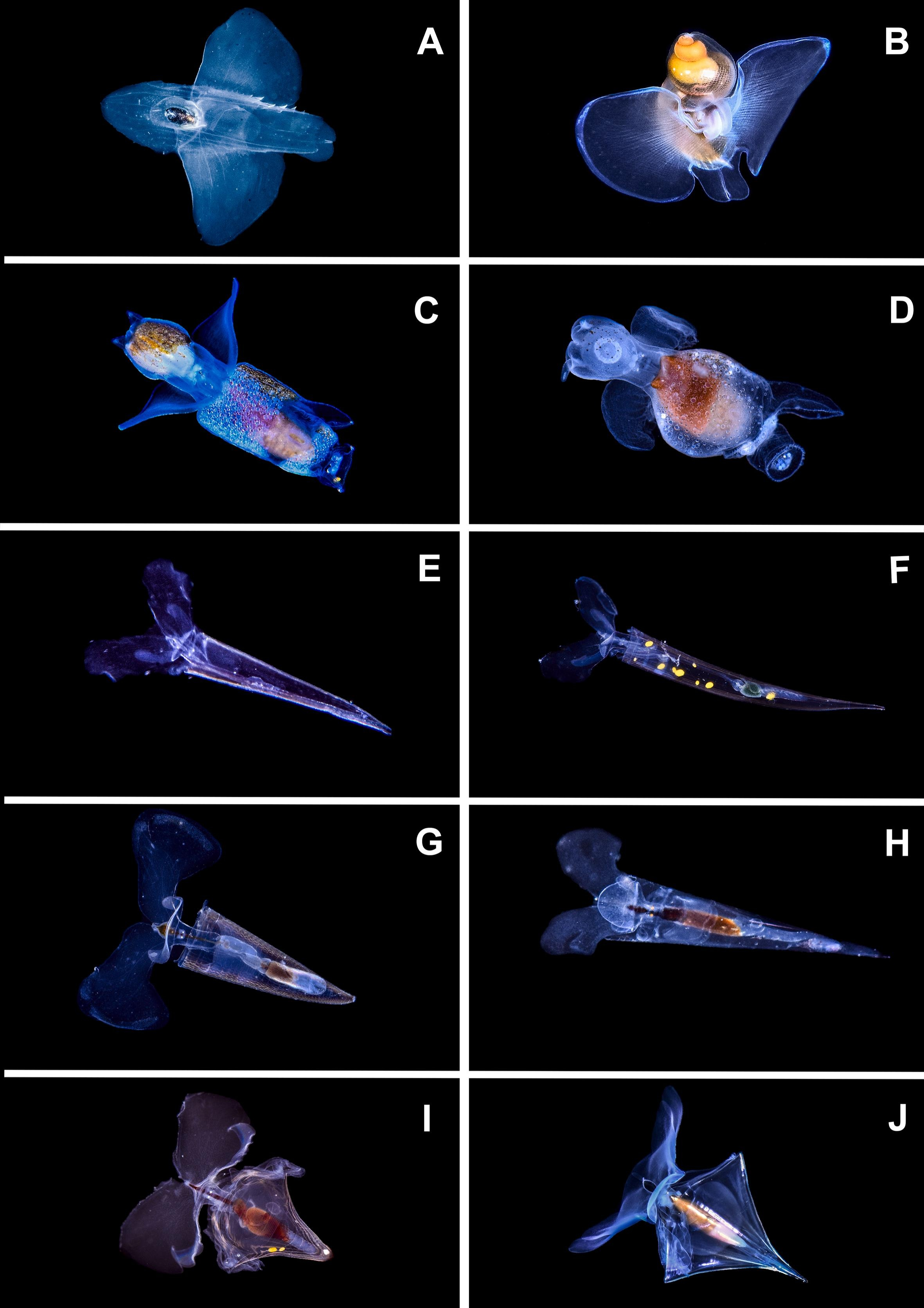
- Various pteropods from the Catalan coast: (A) Cymbulia peronii, (B) Peracle reticulata, (C-D) Pneumodermopsis canephora, (E) Creseis acicula, (F) Creseis conica, (G) Hyalocylis striata, (H) Styliola subula, (I) Cavolinia inflexa, (J) Clio pyramidata

Scientific classification
- Kingdom: Animalia
- Phylum: Mollusca
- Class: Gastropoda
- Clade: Euopisthobranchia
- Order: Pteropoda; Cuvier (1804)

= Pteropoda =

Pteropoda Temporal range: Campanian–Recent

Order of molluscs

Pteropoda (common name pteropods, from Ancient Greek πτερόν (pterón), meaning "wing", and πούς (poús), meaning "foot") are specialized free-swimming pelagic sea snails and sea slugs, marine opisthobranch gastropods. Most live in the top 10 m of the ocean and are less than 1 cm long. The monophyly of Pteropoda is the subject of a lengthy debate; they have even been considered as paraphyletic with respect to cephalopods. Current consensus, guided by molecular studies, leans towards interpreting the group as monophyletic.

Pteropoda encompasses the two clades Thecosomata, the sea butterflies, and Gymnosomata, the sea angels. The Thecosomata (lit. "case-body") have a shell, while the Gymnosomata (lit. "naked body") do not. The two clades may or may not be sister taxa; if not, their similarity (in that they are both pelagic, small, and transparent, and both groups swim using wing-like flaps (parapodia) which protrude from their bodies) may reflect convergent adaptation to their particular lifestyle.

== Taxonomy ==
The group Pteropoda was established by Cuvier as "ptéropodes" in 1804. François Péron and Charles Alexandre Lesueur thought the group to be larger, and so they also included the opisthobranch taxa (Phyllirhoë and Glaucus), the heteropoda taxa (Carinaria and Firola), and even the Ctenophora (Callianira). In 1810, these authors divided the whole group in two separate groups: Those with a shell and those without a shell.

In 1824, H.M.D. de Blainville named these two groups Gymnosomata and Thecosomata and named the combining order Aporobranchia instead of Pteropoda. He rejected the additional genera, except Phyllirhoë which he upgraded to a third group that he called Psilosomata. Only much later was Phyllirhoë classified within the order Nudibranchia.

Other attempts were made to describe the Pteropoda: J.E. Gray divided the Pteropoda into Dactylobranchia (with just the genus Cavolinia) and Pterobranchia (including all the other genera). Cuvier (and his followers) did not accept the classification by de Blainville; they preferred the original classification as described in Le Règne Animal.

Rang (1829) followed the Cuvierian classification but tried to include the character of having a distinct head or not. The German naturalist L. Oken went one step further and, for the sake of symmetry, wanted each order to contain four families and each family to contain four genera. P.A. 1829, divided the Pteropoda according to the size of their fins: "Macroptérygiens" (including only Pneumonoderma) and "Microptérygiens" (including all the others). W.B. Clark (1829) treated the Pteropoda as a family and emended the spelling to Pteropodidae (a name now re-used for a family of fruit bats)

Finally, all these attempts were abandoned and, as more and more species were described as a result of several scientific expeditions, the classification of the Pteropoda into Thecosomata and Gymnosomata was generally adopted. (Note: Many of the new Pteropoda species were first described by French zoologists, for example, Jean René Constant Quoy and Joseph Paul Gaimard, Paul Rang, Alcide d'Orbigny, and Louis François Auguste Souleyet.)

The relationship between these two clades is not unequivocally established, but it seems that they are sister taxa.

== Evolutionary history ==
Pteropods are estimated to have originated during the Early Cretaceous, around 133 million years ago, with the diversification into the major lineages occurring during the mid-late Cretaceous. The oldest known fossil pteropod is a member of Limacinidae from the early-middle Campanian deposits of the San Juan Islands.

== Phylogeny ==
Cladogram of families and species of pteropods.

- Pteropoda
  - Gymnosomata
    - Clionidae
      - Clione limacina
      - Clione antarctica
      - Paedoclione doliiformis
      - Fowlerina punctata
    - Pneumodermatidae
      - Pneumodermopsis spoeli
      - Pneumodermopsis canephora
      - Pneumoderma violaceum
      - Spongiobranchaea australis
  - Thecosomata
    - Pseudothecosomata
      - Cymbuliidae
        - Cymbulia sibogae
        - Cymbulia peronii
      - Peraclidae
        Peracle reticulata
    - Euthecosomata
      - Limacinoidea
        - Limacinidae
          - Heliconoides inflatus
          - Limacina antarctica
          - Limacina helicina
          - Limacina retroversa
          - Limacina lesueurii
          - Limacina bulimoides
          - Limacina trochiformis
      - Cavolinioidea
        - Creseidae
          - Creseis acicula
          - Creseis virgula
          - Creseis roesti
          - Creseis conica
          - Styliola subula
        - Hyalocylidae
          Hyalocylis striata
        - Cliidae
          - Clio pyramidata
          - Clio cuspidata
        - Cuvierinidae
          - Cuvierina atlantica
          - Cuvierina columnella
        - Cavoliniidae
          - Cavolinia inflexa
          - Diacavolinia longirostris
          - Diacria trispinosa
          - Telodiacria danae

The phylogenetic tree has been inferred from 2,654 nuclear proteins (representing 834,394 concatenated amino acid positions).

== Threats ==
=== Vulnerability to ocean acidification ===
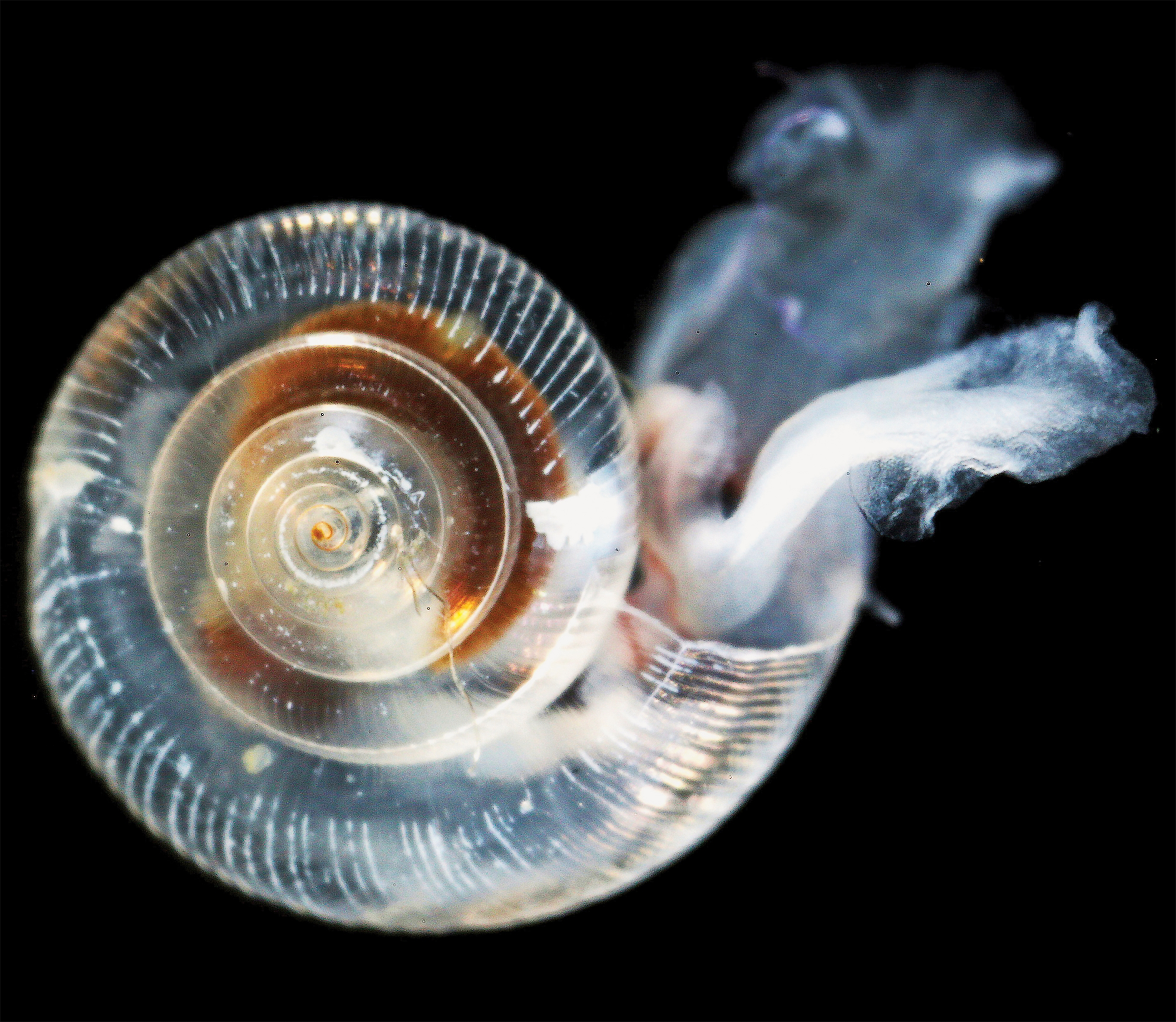
Unhealthy pteropod showing effects of ocean acidification

A study was conducted on the West Coast of the United States to see ocean acidification's effects on pteropods. Limacina helicina was used to test the sensitivity to decreasing pH. This species of pteropod is potentially vulnerable to the corrosive waters associated with ocean acidification due to their calcium carbonate shell. The shell of a pteropod was immersed in ocean water with the projected pH level that the water will reach by the year 2100. After a month and a half in the water, the shell had almost completely dissolved.

== Distribution ==
Pteropods are found in all major oceans, usually 0–10 metres (0–33 ft) below the ocean surface and in all levels of latitude. Pteropods can be found lower than 10 meters, but in less amounts in terms of biomass, however, pteropod distribution is more spread out deeper based on findings. This can be explained as Pteropods from tropical areas become more common in deeper areas. They are not found commonly in the deep sea, in fact, few live lower than 500 meters below sea level. Continental shelves, areas containing many opportunities for nutrients, and productivity are locations in which Pteropods are usually populous, according to patterns in data. Springtime is a peak season for Pteropoda, as they reach higher populations, though data shows that Pteropoda south of the equator are less abundant seasonally. In addition, current data suggests that 93% of the world's pteropods are part of the Thecosomata suborder, while the 7% are Gymnosomata.
