= Clione okhotensis =

Scientific classification
- Kingdom: Animalia
- Phylum: Mollusca
- Class: Gastropoda
- Clade: Euopisthobranchia
- Order: Pteropoda
- Family: Clionidae
- Genus: Clione
- Species: C. okhotensis

Binomial name
- Clione okhotensis Yamazaki & Kuwahara, 2017

Species of sea angel

Clione okhotensis is a species of sea angel, a pelagic marine gastropod (sea slug) in the family Clionidae.

== Distribution ==
The only known localities of Clione okhotensis are in the southern Sea of Okhotsk and the Kuril–Kamchatka Trench area in the western Pacific Ocean. It has been found at depths of 0.3 to 1.5 m (1 ft 0 in to 4 ft 11 in) below the surface of the water. Its distribution overlaps with those of C. limacina and C. elegantissima, two separate species of the same genus found in the North Pacific.

== Description ==
Clione okhotensis only reaches up to 0.8 cm (0.3 in) in body length, making the species substantially smaller than most other Clione species, such as C. limacina, which has a body length of up to 3 cm (1.2 in) in comparison. The species is considered paedomorphic, as adults retain many juvenile characteristics upon maturing. As a result, Clione okhotensis strongly resemble and were previously mistaken for juvenile C. limacina.

Like all Clione species, Clione okhotensis is characterized by a translucent body revealing a bright orange-red visceral mass that occupies much of the upper middle body. Its mouth is represented by a radula with buccal cones and chitinous hooks for predation. Although most Clione species utilize buccal cones for predation, the buccal cones of Clione okhotensis are much smaller than those of other species and are not utilized in predatorial behavior.

== Ecology ==
Clione okhotensis inhabits cold, shallow waters of the Sea of Okhotsk. It is a specialized predator of Limacina helicina, a species of sea snail. Like C. limacina, it utilizes chitinous hooks to secure its prey and swallow it whole. Although its buccal cones are unused in predation, they are still visibly retracted and extended during attempt behavior. During searching behavior, it excretes a sticky fluid and swims with its body elongated and stretched out, characteristics of predatorial behavior that are uniquely not present in C. limacina. A known predator of Clione species is the pink salmon. Though the direct effects of global warming on Clione okhotensis have yet to be evaluated, its populations could be negatively impacted by a decline in the populations of its primary prey, Limacina helicina, which is extremely vulnerable to ocean acidification due to its aragonitic (calcium carbonate) shell.
