= Paedoclione =

Paedoclione doliiformis

Scientific classification
- Kingdom: Animalia
- Phylum: Mollusca
- Class: Gastropoda
- Clade: Euopisthobranchia
- Order: Pteropoda
- Family: Clionidae
- Genus: Paedoclione; Danforth, 1907
- Species: P. doliiformis

Binomial name
- Paedoclione doliiformis Danforth, 1907

Species of gastropod

Paedoclione doliiformis is a species of sea angel, a small floating sea slug, a pelagic marine gastropod mollusk in the family Clionidae.

Paedoclione doliiformis is the only species in the genus Paedoclione.

The generic name is a reference to the paedomorphic habit of this genus, which retains many larval features throughout its life.

Paedoclione doliiformis was originally described by Charles Haskell Danforth in 1907. It was not collected by zoologists for the next 61 years. It was rediscovered in 1968 by Lalli (1972).

== Distribution ==
The type locality of Paedoclione doliiformis is Casco Bay, Portland, Maine.

The distribution includes St. Margarets Bay, Nova Scotia, the Gulf of Maine and possibly elsewhere.

== Description ==
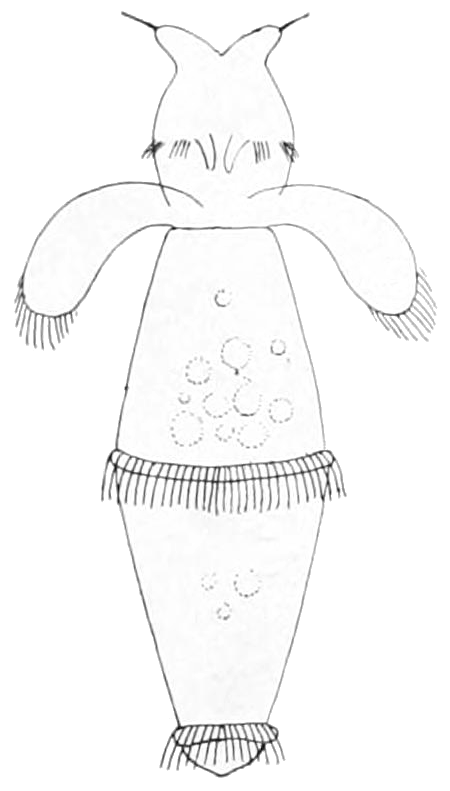
Drawing of ventral view of live Paedoclione doliiformis.

Paedoclione doliiformis retains juvenile (larval) physical characteristics for the whole of its life. This is called neoteny (a kind of pedomorphosis).

The body length is up to 1.5 mm. Paedoclione doliiformis has no shell.

It is a gelatinous, mostly transparent pteropod, and it only has a shell in its embryonic stage.

The orange visceral sac is confined to the anterior part.

== Life cycle ==
Mating is carried out ventrally for mutual fertilization. The following spring, this results in a free-floating, gelatinous egg mass.

Eggs hatch after three days, and the shell is retained until the 11th day.

== Feeding habits ==
Paedoclione doliiformis feeds exclusively on Limacina helicina and on Limacina retroversa, but solely on juveniles with shells smaller than 1 mm. Its abundance is closely linked to that of its prey.
