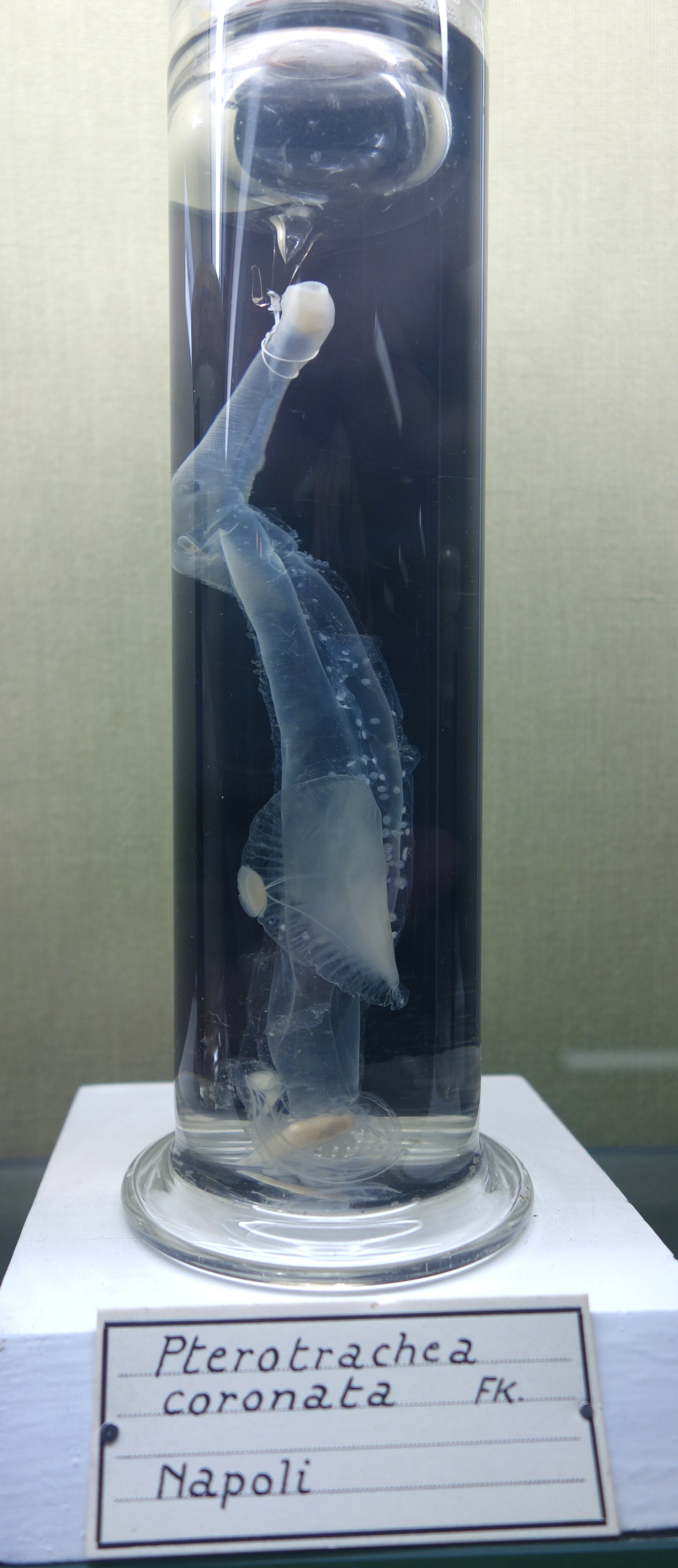

Scientific classification
- Kingdom: Animalia
- Phylum: Mollusca
- Class: Gastropoda
- Subclass: Caenogastropoda
- Order: Littorinimorpha
- Family: Pterotracheidae
- Genus: Pterotrachea
- Species: P. coronata

Binomial name
- Pterotrachea coronata Forsskål, 1775

= Pterotrachea coronata =

Species of gastropod

Pterotrachea coronata, also known as a sea elephant, is a species of large floating sea snail, a pelagic gastropod mollusc in the family Pterotracheidae.

This pelagic snail is not at all closely related to the pelagic opistobranchs such as the sea angels and sea butterflies. It is in the family Pterotracheidae, which is in the clade Littorinimorpha, and as such it is related to such families as the tritons (Ranellidae) and the tun shells (Tonnidae).

== Description ==
The maximum recorded body length is 260 mm.

== Habitat ==
Minimum recorded depth is 0 m. Maximum recorded depth is 250 m.
