= Charles Danforth =

Charles Danforth may refer to:

- Charles Danforth (judge) (1815–1890), justice of the Maine Supreme Judicial Court
- Charles Haskell Danforth (1883–1969), American naturalist, anatomist, researcher, and professor
- Charles Danforth (engineer) (fl. 1850s), co-founder of the locomotive manufacturing company Danforth, Cooke and Company
- Charlie Danforth, fictional character in the High School Musical series
