= Notobranchaeidae =

Scientific classification
- Kingdom: Animalia
- Phylum: Mollusca
- Class: Gastropoda
- Clade: Euopisthobranchia
- Order: Pteropoda
- Superfamily: Clionoidea
- Family: Notobranchaeidae (Pelseneer, 1886)

Genera and species
- See text

Family of gastropods

The Notobranchaeidae, or "naked sea butterflies", are a taxonomic family of floating sea slugs, specifically under the subclass Opistobranchia, also called "sea angels".

Similar to other Pteropods, these pelagic marine heterobranch gastropod mollusks are holoplanktonic.

== Morphology ==
While they are not particularly strong swimmers, the foot of these organisms is modified into wing-like structures, called parapodia that they employ for locomotion. Additionally, like other Pteropods of the order Gymnosomata, Notobrachaeidae lack shells entirely as adults. However, they do possess a shell earlier on in their lives. They are also defined by how they possess a posterior gill, strong jaws, grasping tentacles that frequently possess suckers resembling those of cephalopods, and usually buccal cones as well.

== Behavior ==
Like other members of the clade Gymnosomata, Notobrachaeidae are highly specialized holoplanktonic carnivores. In other words, they spend their entire lives hunting in the water column and cannot swim against the column. Also like other members of this clade, Notobrachaeidae feed are very specific prey, with a species in this clade usually specializing in hunting one specific genus of thecosomes, which are also known as "sea butterflies," and form a sister clade to Gymnosomata with the primary difference being how adults of that clade possess shells into adulthood while Gymnosomata do not.

== Distribution ==
Members of this family are found globally throughout the upper reaches of the water column, in the pelagic zone, most commonly the epipelagic zone. Following the trend of Pteropods in general, they tend to have the highest species diversity tropical and subtropical latitudes but are less abundant under these conditions. Conversely, they are more abundant but possess less variety in terms of species closer to the north and south poles. However, even in the tropics, they generally appear in high concentrations, resulting in their frequently playing important roles in planktonic food webs.

== Genera and species ==
Genera and species in the family Notobranchaeidae include:

Genus: Notobranchaea Pelseneer, 1886

- Notobranchaea bleekerae van der Spoel & Pafort-van Iersel, 1985
  - Distribution : Oceanic
- Notobranchaea grandis Pruvot-Fol, 1942
  - Distribution : Oceanic
  - Length : 15 mm
- Notobranchaea hjorti (Bonnevie, 1913)
- Notobranchaea inopinata Pelseneer, 1887
  - Distribution : Oceanic
  - Length : 5 mm
- Notobranchaea longicollis (Bonnevie, 1913)
- Notobranchaea macdonaldi Pelseneer, 1886
  - Distribution : Bermuda, Oceanic
  - Length : 5 mm
- Notobranchaea tetrabranchiata Bonnevie, 1913
  - Distribution : Oceanic
  - Length : 16 mm
- Notobranchaea valdiviae Meisenheimer, 1905

Genera brought into synonymy

- Microdonta Bonnevie, 1913: synonym of Notobranchaea Pelseneer, 1886 (invalid: junior homonym of Microdonta Dejean, 1835 [Coleoptera]; Schleschia is a replacement name)
- Prionoglossa Tesch, 1950: synonym of Notobranchaea Pelseneer, 1886
- Schleschia Strand, 1932: synonym of Notobranchaea Pelseneer, 1886
