= Pelseneer =

Pelseneer can be:

- Pelseneer Island, and islands of Antarctica
- Paul Pelseneer, full name Jean Paul Louis Pelseneer (1863-1945), Belgian malacologist.
