= Pterotrachea hippocampus =

Scientific classification
- Kingdom: Animalia
- Phylum: Mollusca
- Class: Gastropoda
- Subclass: Caenogastropoda
- Order: Littorinimorpha
- Superfamily: Pterotracheoidea
- Family: Pterotracheidae
- Genus: Pterotrachea
- Species: P. hippocampus

Binomial name
- Pterotrachea hippocampus Philippi, 1836

Synonyms
- Firola cuviera Lesueur, 1817 (dubious synonym); Firola forskalia Lesueur, 1817 (dubious synonym); Firola frederica Lesueur, 1817 (dubious synonym); Firola gibbosa Lesueur, 1817 (dubious synonym); Firola hyalina Oken, 1815 (dubious synonym); Firola mutica Lesueur, 1817 (dubious synonym); Firola peronia Lesueur, 1817 (dubious synonym); Firola souleyeti Vayssière, 1904 (dubious synonym); Pterotrachea cuvierii Chamisso & Eysenhardt, 1821 (synonym); Pterotrachea frederica (Lesueur & Peron, 1817) (uncertain synonym); Pterotrachea hippocampus var. apunctata Bonnevie, 1920; Pterotrachea minuta Bonnevie, 1920; Pterotrachea mutabilis Tesch, 1906; Pterotrachea mutica (Lesueur, 1817) (uncertain synonym); Pterotrachea orthophtalmus Tesch, 1906

Species of gastropod

Pterotrachea hippocampus is a species of marine gastropod. Also known as the Sea Elephant. A type of sea snail in the family Pterotracheidae.

On February 18, 2024 - a twitter user uploaded a video clip and images of the Sea Elephant. It has since become viral and many other users are creating artistic interpretations of the sea snail.
