= Paraclione =

Scientific classification
- Domain: Eukaryota
- Kingdom: Animalia
- Phylum: Mollusca
- Class: Gastropoda
- Clade: Euopisthobranchia
- Order: Pteropoda
- Family: Clionidae
- Genus: Paraclione; Tesch, 1903

Species
- See text

Genus of gastropods

Paraclione is a genus of "sea angels", small floating sea slugs, pelagic marine opisthobranch gastropod mollusks.

They are very small and gelatinous, mostly transparent, and they only have a shell during their embryonic stage. They can be found in the Atlantic Ocean.

== Species ==
Species in the genus Paraclione include:

- Paraclione flavescens Gegenbaur, 1855 (synonyms : Clionina aurantiaca Franc, 1951 ; Clionina flavescens Franc, 1951 )
- Paraclione longicaudata Souleyet, 1852 (synonyms : Clio longicaudata Souleyet, 1851 ; Clionina longicaudata Souleyet, 1851)

== See also ==
- Sea angel
