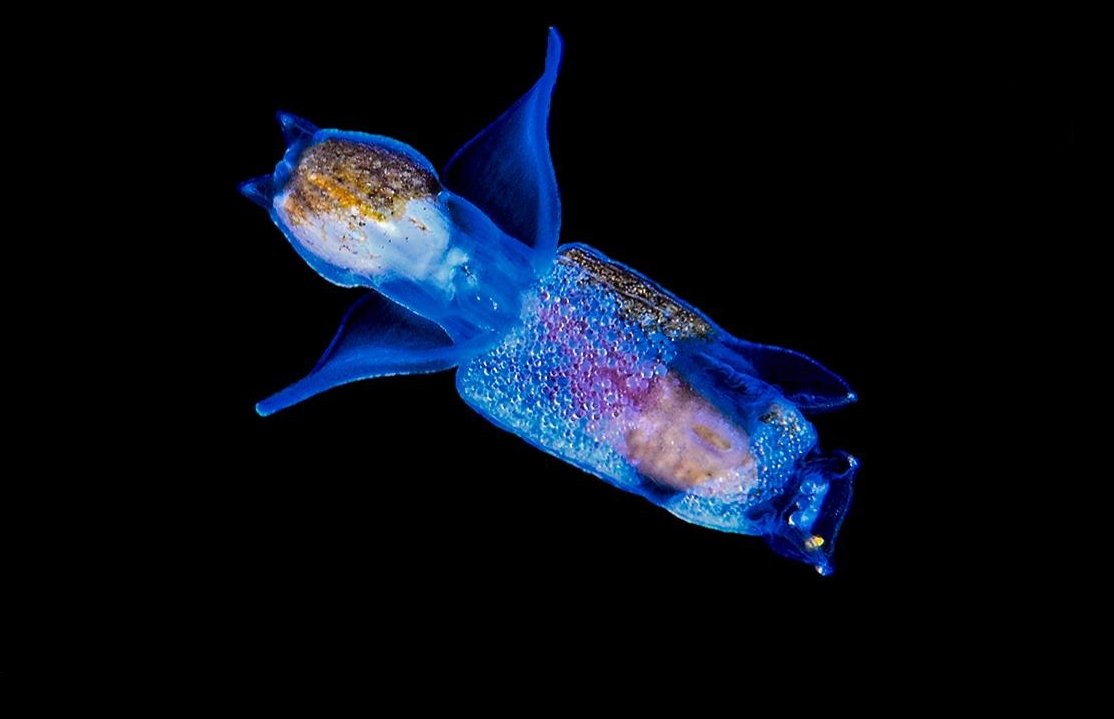
- live specimen of Pneumodermopsis canephora

Scientific classification
- Kingdom: Animalia
- Phylum: Mollusca
- Class: Gastropoda
- Clade: Euopisthobranchia
- Order: Pteropoda
- Family: Pneumodermatidae
- Genus: Pneumodermopsis
- Species: P. canephora

Binomial name
- Pneumodermopsis canephora Pruvot-Fol, 1924

Synonyms
- Pneumodermopsis oligocotyla Massy, 1917 (dubious synonym)

= Pneumodermopsis canephora =

Species of gastropod

Pneumodermopsis canephora is a species of sea angel. It has been observed near the Canary Islands, and in the waters surrounding south-west Florida.

== Description ==
Pneumodermopsis canephora is distinct from other species in the genera, as it is characterized by the enormous urn-shaped terminal sucker on its median arm, which is itself a distinct rim covered by papillae. Pneumodermopsis canephora also contains a piston at the top of the sucker, which contains long cilia. Pneumodermopsis canephora contains 32 chromosomes.
