= Fowlerina punctata =

Scientific classification
- Kingdom: Animalia
- Phylum: Mollusca
- Class: Gastropoda
- Clade: Euopisthobranchia
- Order: Pteropoda
- Family: Clionidae
- Genus: Fowlerina
- Species: F. punctata

Binomial name
- Fowlerina punctata Tesch, 1903

Species of gastropod

Fowlerina punctata is a species of naked pelagic sea snail, specifically a pteropod.

== Description ==
F. punctata can grow up to 6 mm, and has a transparent body with well-developed lateral footlobes. The species is a protandric hermaphrodite, and is a carnivore. It preys on shelled pteropods.

== Distribution ==
The species inhabits sessile and subtropical waters, and has been observed in the Mediterranean and Alboran Seas. It has been also observed near Cape Verde, in westernmost Africa.
