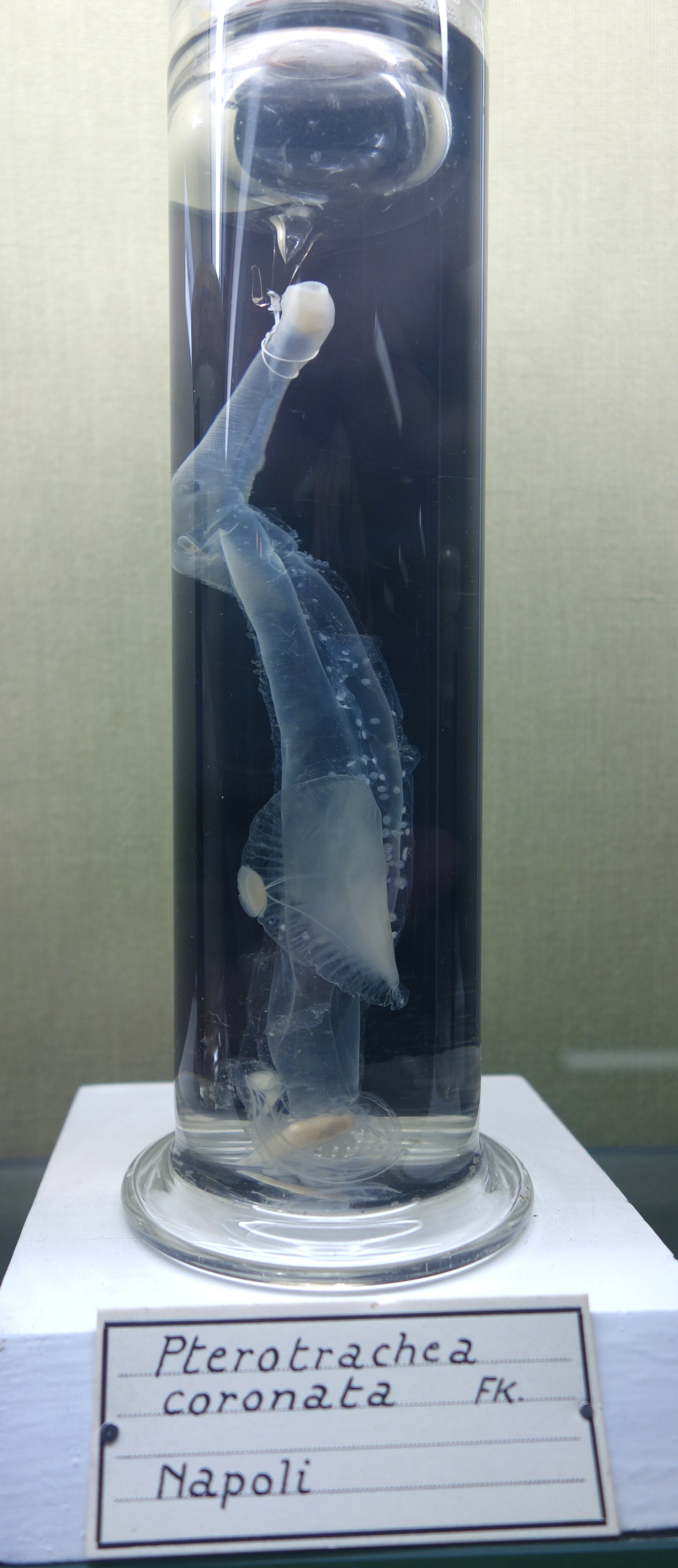

Scientific classification
- Kingdom: Animalia
- Phylum: Mollusca
- Class: Gastropoda
- Subclass: Caenogastropoda
- Order: Littorinimorpha
- Family: Pterotracheidae
- Genus: Pterotrachea; Forskål, 1775

Species
- Pterotrachea coronata Forskål, 1775; Pterotrachea hippocampus Philippi, 1836; Pterotrachea keraudrenii J. E. Gray, 1850; Pterotrachea scutata Gegenbaur, 1855

Synonyms
- Euryops Tesch, 1906; Firola Bruguière, 1791; Heterodens Bonnevie, 1920; Pterotrachea (Euryops) Tesch, 1906

= Pterotrachea =

Genus of gastropods

Pterotrachea is a taxonomic genus of medium-sized to large floating sea slugs, marine pelagic gastropod molluscs in the family Pterotracheidae, which is in the infraorder Littorinimorpha. As such they are quite closely related to such families as the tritons (Ranellidae) and the tun shells (Tonnidae).

These pelagic slugs are not at all closely related to the pelagic opisthobranch gastropods such as the sea angels and sea butterflies.

== Species ==
Species within the genus Pterotrachea include:

- Pterotrachea coronata Forskål, 1775
- Pterotrachea hippocampus Philippi, 1836
- Pterotrachea keraudrenii J. E. Gray, 1850
- Pterotrachea minuta
- Pterotrachea scutata Gegenbaur, 1855

Taxon inquirendum

- Pterotrachea talismani Vayssière, 1902
