= God of destruction =

God of destruction may refer to:

== Religion and mythology ==
- Batara Kala, Indonesian god of the underworld, time, and destruction
- Nergal, Mesopotamian god of the sun, underworld, war, and destruction
- Perses (Titan), god of destruction in Greek mythology
- Shiva, one of the principal deities of Hinduism, known as The Destroyer
- Kali, wife of Shiva's aspect, Mahakala
- Owuo, Akan god of Death and Destruction. Known as the Death of Creation (The Destroyer)

== Fictional uses ==
- Bastard!! The Dark God of Destruction, a 1988 Japanese manga series
- Ongo, the God of Wood and Destruction, a character in 1997 Jungle De Ikou!
- Magu-chan: God of Destruction, a 2020 Japanese manga series
- Trillion: God of Destruction, a 2015 Japanese video game
- Beerus, the God of Destruction, a character in the Dragon Ball franchise
- Yami Sukehiro, the Destruction God, a character in the manga series Black Clover
- Alexander, God of Destruction, a character from the 2005 video game Makai Kingdom: Chronicles of the Sacred Tome
- Plagg, the God of Destruction, a character in the cartoon Miraculous: Tales of Ladybug & Cat Noir

== See also ==
- Chaos gods
- List of war deities
