= Fowlerina =

Scientific classification
- Domain: Eukaryota
- Kingdom: Animalia
- Phylum: Mollusca
- Class: Gastropoda
- Clade: Euopisthobranchia
- Order: Pteropoda
- Family: Clionidae
- Subfamily: Clioninae
- Genus: Fowlerina; Pelseneer, 1906

Type species
- Fowlerina zetesios Pelseneer, 1906

Species
- 2, see text

Genus of gastropods

Fowlerina is a genus of small sea slugs in the family Clionidae. It was described by Paul Pelseneer in 1906.

== Species ==
The genus Fowlerina includes the following species:

- Fowlerina punctata (Tesch, 1903)
- Fowlerina zetesios Pelseneer, 1906
