= Clione elegantissima =

Scientific classification
- Kingdom: Animalia
- Phylum: Mollusca
- Class: Gastropoda
- Clade: Euopisthobranchia
- Order: Pteropoda
- Family: Clionidae
- Genus: Clione
- Species: C. elegantissima

Binomial name
- Clione elegantissima Dall, W. H. (1871)

Synonyms
- Clione dalli (A. Krause, 1885)

Species of gastropod

Clione elegantissima is a species of sea angel (pelagic sea slug) in the family Clionidae.

== Taxonomy ==
There has been some debate regarding the taxonomic status of Clione elegantissima, with some researchers considering it to be a separate species and others considering it to be an immature individual of Clione limacina. However, recent studies have suggested that based on a phylogenetic analysis, populations of Clione limacina in the North Atlantic and North Pacific Oceans are separate species, with the valid names being Clione limacina (Phipps, 1774) and Clione elegantissima (Dall, 1871), respectively.

== Distribution ==
Clione elegantissima is found in the North Pacific Ocean.

== Description ==
Clione elegantissima has small, pink pinnae with translucent edges, while a bright crimson ray can be found in the center of each one. They are sub-triangular in shape. The body is pyriform, with a slender caudal end that is typically curved to one side. On the back, ventral side, and tail, there is a patch of brownish crimson with well-defined edges, while the rest of the body is brownish pink. The head is well-differentiated and has longitudinal stripes of carmine on a lighter background. There are two short, cylindrical, brownish tentacles. The cephalic lobes are six in number and are thick, leaf-like, and short. They are covered with fine granulations or pores on their anterior sides, which are flattened and of the most brilliant carmine. The disk is cleft in the median line, and the mouth has two broad carmine labia.

== Ecology ==
The species displays search behavior, and it does not use its buccal cones for predation.
