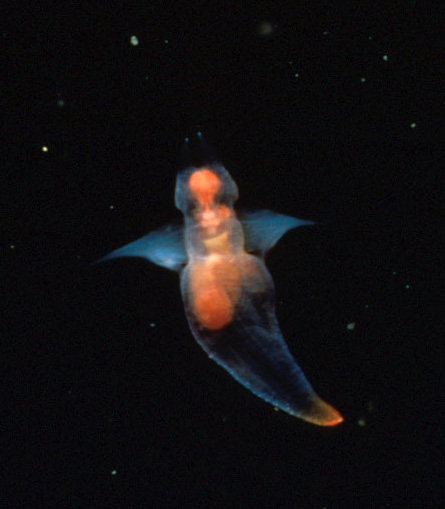
- Clione limacina

Scientific classification
- Domain: Eukaryota
- Kingdom: Animalia
- Phylum: Mollusca
- Class: Gastropoda
- Clade: Euopisthobranchia
- Order: Pteropoda
- Suborder: Gymnosomata
- Superfamily: Clionoidea

Families
- See text

= Clionoidea =

Superfamily of gastropods

Clionoidea is a taxonomic superfamily of sea slugs, specifically naked (i.e. unshelled) pteropods, marine opisthobranch gastropod mollusks in the clade Gymnosomata. They are sometimes called "sea angels" or "naked sea butterflies" along with the other superfamily in the Gymnosomata. They can be found anywhere from the surface to a depth of 350 meters. They are transparent and small, with the largest of the species being up to 5 cm.

== Common Clione ==
Some species of sea angel feed only on sea butterflies. The angels have terminal mouths with the radula common to mollusks, and tentacles to grasp their prey, sometimes with suckers similar to cephalopods. Their "wings" allow sea angels to swim much faster than the larger (usually fused) wings of sea butterflies.

Gymnosomes slowly beat their wing-like parapodia in a rowing motion to propel their perfectly-streamlined bodies through the upper 20 meters of the water column. Although usually slow moving, beating their wings once or twice per second, they are capable of bursts of speed when they need to pursue their prey, calling a separate suite of muscles into action to obtain the higher beat frequency. The IPCC reports that increasing atmospheric carbon dioxide is causing acidification of the oceans, which could eliminate pteropods from the Southern Ocean and cause serious repercussions throughout the food chain.

== Taxonomy ==
In the new taxonomy of Bouchet & Rocroi (2005), the superfamily Clionoidea consists of the following families:

- Clionidae
- Cliopsidae
- Notobranchaeidae
- Pneumodermatidae
