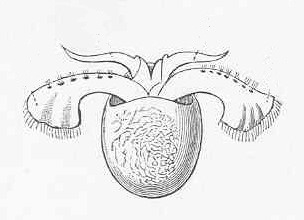
- Hydromyles globulosus

Scientific classification
- Domain: Eukaryota
- Kingdom: Animalia
- Phylum: Mollusca
- Class: Gastropoda
- Clade: Euopisthobranchia
- Order: Pteropoda
- Suborder: Gymnosomata
- Superfamily: Hydromyloidea

Species
- Hydromyles globulosus; Lagioniopsis triloba

= Hydromyloidea =

Superfamily of gastropods

Hydromyloidea is a taxonomic superfamily of sea slugs, specifically sea angels, marine opisthobranch gastropod mollusks in the order Gymnosomata.

== Taxonomy ==
There are two families within the superfamily Hydromyloidea:

- Family Hydromylidae
- Family Laginiopsidae
