= Laginiopsidae =

Scientific classification
- Kingdom: Animalia
- Phylum: Mollusca
- Class: Gastropoda
- Clade: Euopisthobranchia
- Order: Pteropoda
- Superfamily: Hydromyloidea
- Family: Laginiopsidae (Pruvot-Fol, 1922)

Genera
- See text

Family of gastropods

The Laginiopsidae are a taxonomic family of planktonic, marine opisthobranch gastropod mollusks in the suborder Gymnosomata, commonly called the 'sea angels'. These small pelagic snails lack shells (except in their early embryonic stage).

Laginiopsidae is represented by a single species (Laginiopsis trilobata), itself known from only a single specimen. This was one of several species described by the French malacologist Alice Pruvot-Fol. Like other Gymnosomata, the Laginiopsids are likely carnivorous, though nothing about the species' feeding habits and life history are recorded.

The body of the single species is rounded with large swimming parapoda (wings). The various tentacles, suckers, jaws, and radula typical of other Gymnosomata are all absent in this family (the lack of a radula being particularly distinctive). The head has a long proboscis tipped with the mouth and three fleshy lobes.

== Genera and species ==
Genus and species within the family Laginiopsidae include:

- Genus Laginiopsis Pruvot-Fol, 1922
  - Laginiopsis triloba - distribution: Azores, description: proboscis ends in three fleshy lobes
