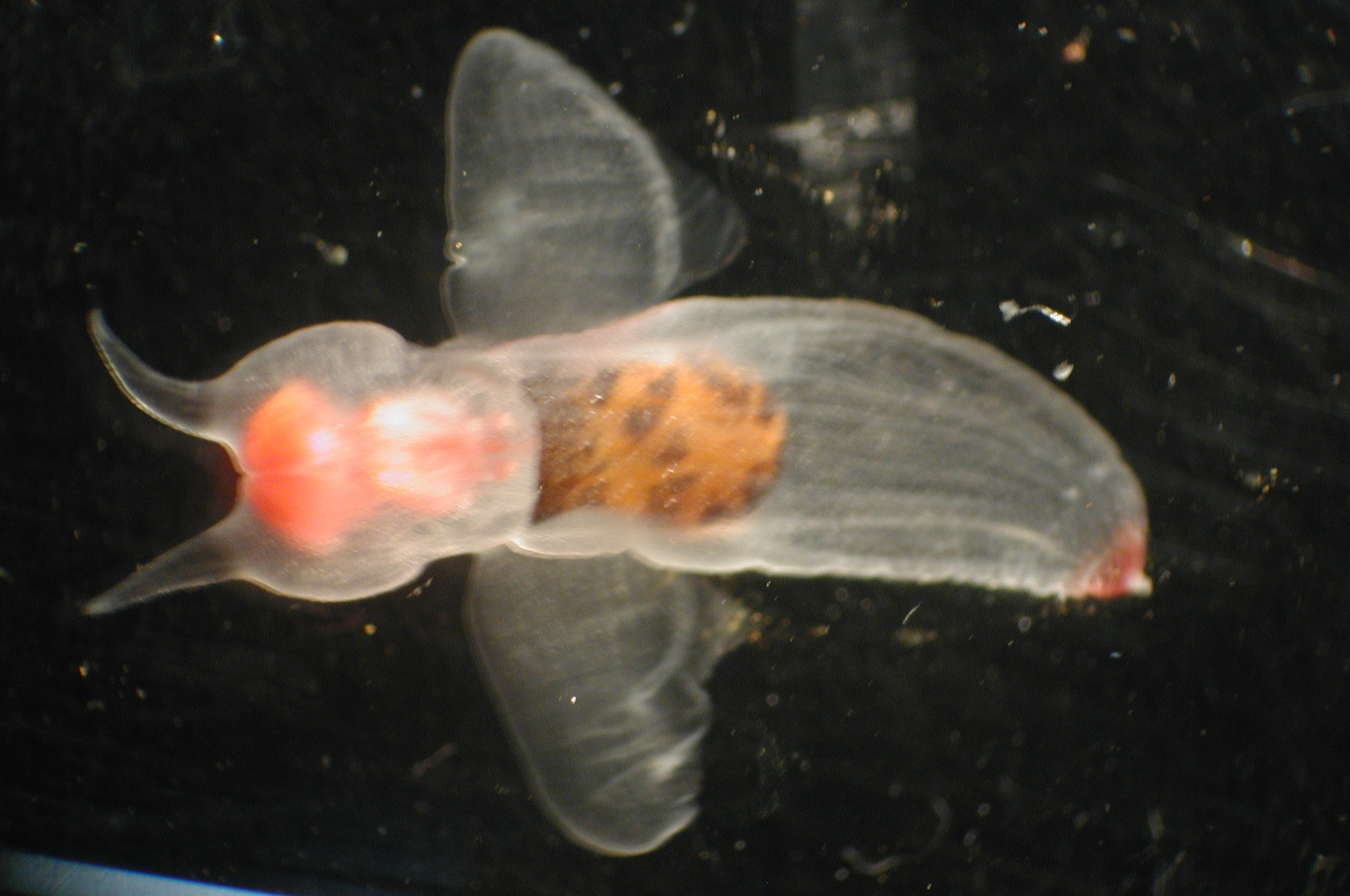
- Clione limacina

Scientific classification
- Kingdom: Animalia
- Phylum: Mollusca
- Class: Gastropoda
- Clade: Euopisthobranchia
- Order: Pteropoda
- Family: Clionidae
- Subfamily: Clioninae
- Genus: Clione; Pallas, 1774

Synonyms
- Trichocyclus Eschscholtz, 1825

= Clione =

Genus of gastropods

Clione is a genus of small, floating sea slugs, pelagic marine gastropod mollusks in the family Clionidae, the sea angels.

Clione is the type genus of the family Clionidae.

== Species ==
Species within the genus Clione include:

- Clione antarctica (Smith, 1902)
- Clione elegantissima (Dall, 1871)
- Clione japonica Yamazaki, Shimada & Zhang, 2025
- Clione limacina (Phipps, 1774)
- Clione okhotensis Yamazaki & Kuwahara, 2017
