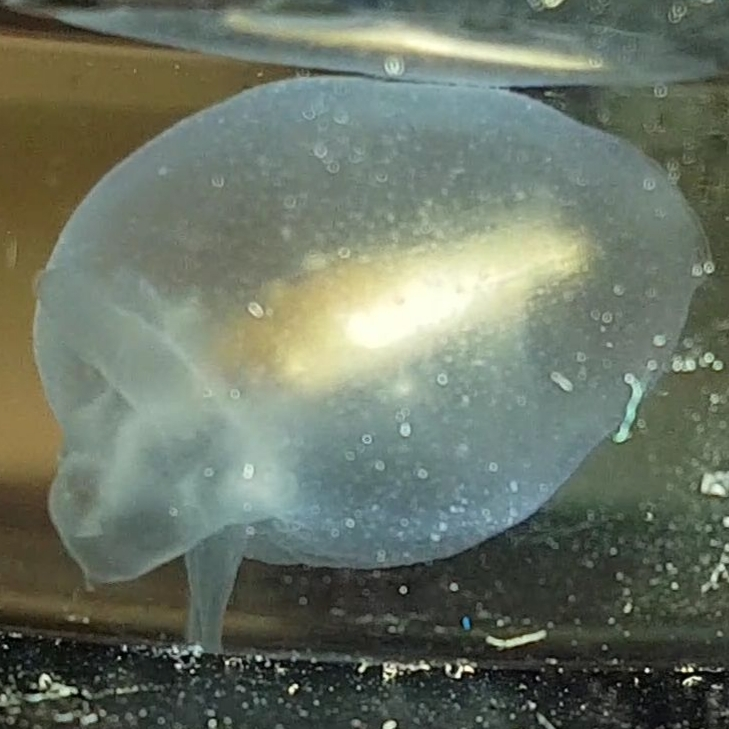

Scientific classification
- Domain: Eukaryota
- Kingdom: Animalia
- Phylum: Mollusca
- Class: Gastropoda
- Clade: Euopisthobranchia
- Order: Pteropoda
- Family: Cliopsidae
- Genus: Cliopsis; Troschel, 1854
- Species: C. krohnii

Binomial name
- Cliopsis krohnii Troschel, 1854

Synonyms
- List (Genus): Clionopsis [lapsus]; (Species): Clio mediterranea Gegenbaur, 1855; Cliopsis grandis Boas, 1886; Clionopsis modesta Pelseneer, 1887; Cliopsis modesta Pelseneer, 1887; Cliopsis microcephalus Tesch, 1904

= Cliopsis =

Cliopsis krohnii

Species of gastropod

Cliopsis Troschel, 1854 is a genus of sea angels belonging to the family Cliopsidae. It is monotypic, being represented by the single species Cliopsis krohnii.

== Taxonomy ==
The Marine Species Identification Portal recognizes three morphs :

- Cliopsis krohni morpha grandis Boas, 1886; body length : 40 mm
- Cliopsis krohni morpha krohni Troschel, 1854; body length : 24 mm
- Cliopsis krohni morpha modesta (Pelseneer, 1887); body length : 3 mm

== Description ==
Cliopsis krohnii has a somewhat long, flabby, gelatinous body with a bluish aspect. The head is rather small with the nuchal tentacles much developed. The posterior gill possesses four distinct radiating hexagonal crests lacking foldings or fringes. The foot is reduced to three small median lobes. The anterior lobes of the foot show a posterior right angle. The posterior end of the foot has a folded tubercle that is not divided by longitudinal wrinkle in the middle. The distal extremities of the fins are rounded. It lacks a shell except during its early embryonic stage. The small lateral winglike flaps (parapodia) are used in a slow swimming mode.

This species is a highly specialized predator. It preys on pseudothecosomes, such as Corolla. On making contact with the wide mucous web of its victim, it grabs the victim with a long proboscis (up to twice its own length), chitinous hooks (with the hook sacs containing about 60 hooks) and cutting radular teeth. They can eat victims three times their own size.

== Distribution and habitat ==
Cliopsis krohnii is a small free-swimming sea slug, found in all warm and temperate seas where it is pelagic and lives amidst plankton as deep as 1,500 m.
