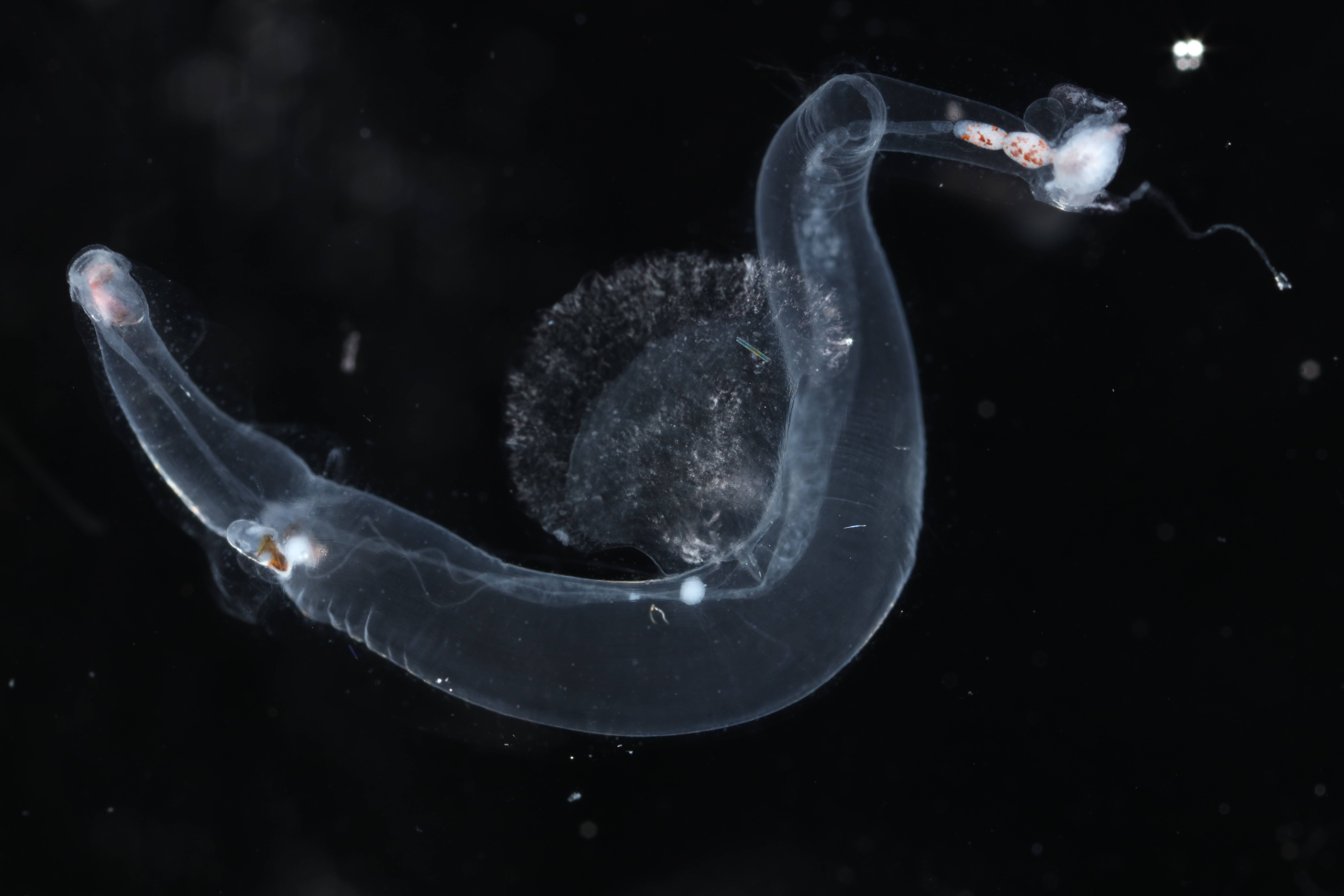

Scientific classification
- Kingdom: Animalia
- Phylum: Mollusca
- Class: Gastropoda
- Subclass: Caenogastropoda
- Order: Littorinimorpha
- Family: Pterotracheidae
- Genus: Firoloida; Lesueur, 1817
- Species: F. desmarestia

Binomial name
- Firoloida desmarestia Lesueur, 1817

Synonyms
- Cyclostrema minutum Jeffreys, 1883; Cyclostrema solutum di Geronimo, 1974; Firola gaimardi d'Orbigny, 1836; Firola lesueurii d'Orbigny, 1836; Firola liguriae Issel, 1910; Firolella gracilis Troschel, 1855; Firolella vigilans Troschel, 1855; Firoloida aculeata Lesueur, 1817; Firoloida blainvilleana Lesueur, 1817; Firoloida demarestia Lesueur, 1817); Firoloida kowalewskyi Vayssière, 1903; Pterotrachea lesueri Risso, 1826

= Firoloida =

Firoloida desmarestia

Genus of gastropods

Firoloida is a monotypic genus of pelagic marine gastropod mollusc in the family Pterotracheidae, with the only species in the genus being Firoloida desmarestia. This shell-less mollusc is found in tropical and sub-tropical waters in the epipelagic zone of the world's oceans.

== Taxonomy ==
Both genus and species were first described in 1817 by the French artist and naturalist Charles Alexandre Lesueur. He named the species in honour of the French zoologist Anselme Gaëtan Desmarest but made an error in spelling the specific name and called the mollusc F. demarestia. Subsequent authors corrected this to F. desmarestia, but according to the rules of precedence of scientific names, the misspelling should stand. However the ICZN determined that F. desmarestia was preferable and substituted it for the original name.

== Description ==
Firoloida desmarestia has a proboscis, a long, transparent cylindrical body and a short, ventral tail. It has a large, rounded swimming fin, situated towards the front of the mollusc, and the opaque visceral nucleus, a mass which includes the liver, heart, gonad, sexual glands and kidneys, at the rear. Males have a sucker on the front edge of the fin, large tentacles in front of the eyes, and a tail filament, while females lack the sucker and tentacles, and have a string of eggs trailing behind them.

== Distribution ==
Firoloida desmarestia is found in warm oceanic waters and is of cosmopolitan distribution. It has been collected from the upper 145 metres (476 ft) of the sea and it seems to be uncommon in the north Central Atlantic Ocean, more plentiful in the Indian Ocean and rare in the northern Pacific Ocean around Hawaii.

== Biology ==
The sexes are separate in Firoloida desmarestia. A string of eggs in varying stages of development trail behind the female. Newly fertilised eggs are close to the visceral nucleus while veliger larvae, complete with a shell of two whorls and a rounded aperture, are at the far end and eventually become detached. All stages of this mollusc are planktonic.
