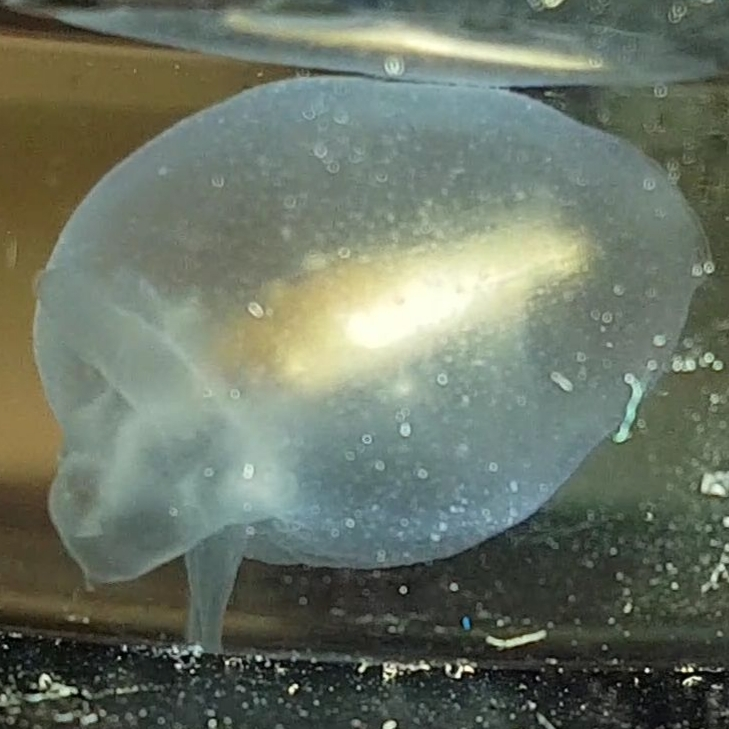
- Cliopsis krohnii

Scientific classification
- Kingdom: Animalia
- Phylum: Mollusca
- Class: Gastropoda
- Clade: Euopisthobranchia
- Order: Pteropoda
- Superfamily: Clionoidea
- Family: Cliopsidae (Costa, 1873)

= Cliopsidae =

Family of gastropods

The Cliopsidae, common name sea angels, are a taxonomic family of small, free-swimming sea slugs, pelagic marine opisthobranch gastropod mollusks in the order Opisthobranchia.

As is the case in all gymnosome pteropods, these sea angels lack a shell except during an early embryonic stage.

The small lateral wing-like flaps (parapodia) are used in a slow swimming mode. The foot is reduced to three small median lobes.

== Genera and species ==
There are two monotypic genera recognised in the family Cliopsidae:

Genus Cliopsis Troschel, 1854

- Cliopsis krohnii Troschel, 1854

Genus Pruvotella Pruvot-Fol, 1932

- Pruvotella danae Pruvot-Fol, 1942
  - Distribution : Bermuda, Oceanic
  - Length : 10 mm
