= Thalassopterus =

Thalassopterus zancleus

Scientific classification
- Kingdom: Animalia
- Phylum: Mollusca
- Class: Gastropoda
- Clade: Euopisthobranchia
- Order: Pteropoda
- Family: Clionidae
- Genus: Thalassopterus; Kwietniewski, 1910
- Species: T. zancleus

Binomial name
- Thalassopterus zancleus Kwietniewski, 1910

Species of gastropod

Thalassopterus zancleus is a species of swimming sea slug, a shell-less pelagic marine opisthobranch gastropod mollusk in the family Clionidae.

Thalassopterus zancleus is the only species in the monotypic genus Thalassopterus. It is known only from juveniles stages. Adults have not yet been found.
