= Pneumoderma violaceum =

Scientific classification
- Domain: Eukaryota
- Kingdom: Animalia
- Phylum: Mollusca
- Class: Gastropoda
- Clade: Euopisthobranchia
- Order: Pteropoda
- Family: Pneumodermatidae
- Genus: Pneumoderma
- Species: P. violaceum

Binomial name
- Pneumoderma violaceum Orbigny, A. D. d'. (1834-1847)

Species of mollusc

Pneumoderma violaceum is a species of sea angel, a type of pteropod or sea slug. It has small wings and tentacles to catch its prey, being the sea butterfly.

== Distribution ==
The species is found in deep waters near Patagonia, Alaska and the Gulf of Mexico.
