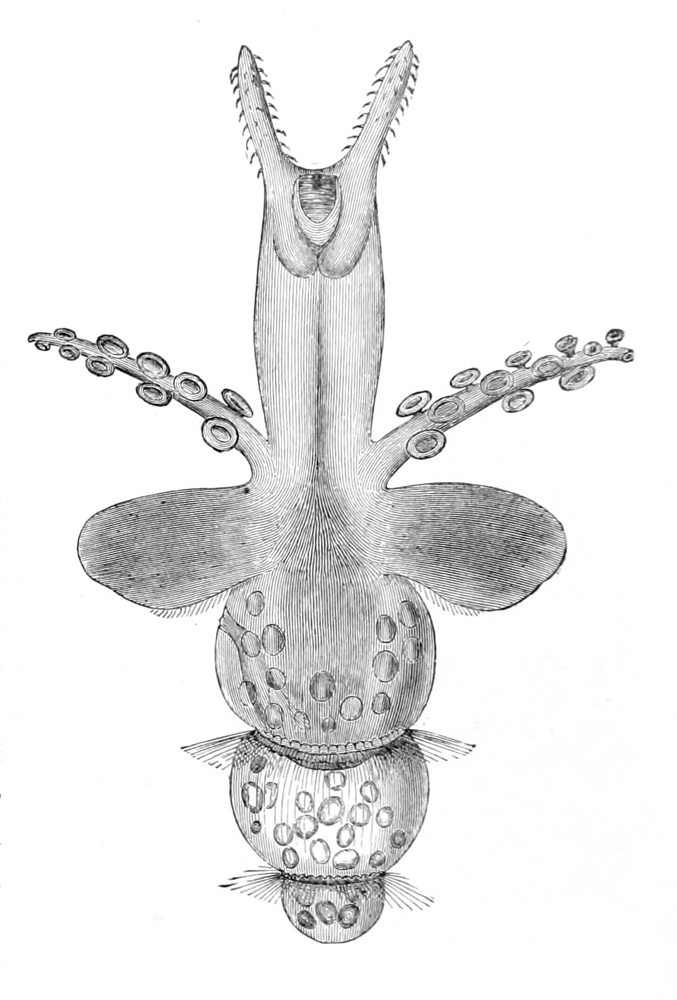
- Drawing of a larva of a species in the genus Pneumoderma

Scientific classification
- Kingdom: Animalia
- Phylum: Mollusca
- Class: Gastropoda
- Clade: Euopisthobranchia
- Order: Pteropoda
- Superfamily: Clionoidea
- Family: Pneumodermatidae (Latreille, 1825)

Genera
- Pneumoderma; Pneumodermopsis; Schizobrachium; Spongiobranchaea; Abranchaea; Platybrachium

= Pneumodermatidae =

Family of gastropods

The Pneumodermatidae are a family of sea angels, or small floating predatory sea snails or sea slugs. They are pelagic marine heterobranch opisthobranch gastropod mollusks in the clade Gymnosomata.

These small pelagic snails lack shells (except in their early embryonic stage). They are carnivores, equipped with swimming parapoda (fleshy, wing-like outgrowths), strong jaws, and grasping tentacles, often with suckers resembling those of cephalopods.

== Genera ==
Genera within the family Pneumodermatidae include:

Genus: Pneumoderma de Roissy, 1805

- Pneumoderma atlanticum Oken, 1815
- Pneumoderma degraaffi van der Spoel & Pafort-van Iersel, 1982 – distribution: Sargasso Sea, length: 11.8 mm
- Pneumoderma mediterraneum van Beneden, 1838 – distribution: Florida, Brazil, Mediterranean, length: 20 mm
- Pneumoderma peronii Lamarck, 1819 – distribution: Red Sea
- Pneumoderma violaceum d'Orbigny, 1836 – distribution: Bermuda, oceanic, length: 25 mm, description: This pteropod grabs its prey with two powerful suckers, each with about 30 suctorial disks, then it bulges out its long proboscis.
    - Pneumoderma violaceum pacificum Dall, 1871
    - Pneumoderma violaceum violaceum d'Orbigny, 1836

Genus: Pneumodermopsis Keferstein, 1862

- Pneumodermopsis canephora Pruvot-Fol, 1924
- Pneumodermopsis ciliata (Gegenbaur, 1855) – distribution: circumglobal, oceanic, description: possesses five tentacles, each ending in a big suctorial disk
- Pneumodermopsis macrochira Meisenheimer, 1905 – distribution: oceanic
- Pneumodermopsis michaelsarsi Bonnevie, 1913 – distribution: Bermuda, oceanic
- Pneumodermopsis oligocotyla Massy, 1917
- Pneumodermopsis paucidens (Boas, 1886) – distribution: Brazil, oceanic, length: 5 mm
- Pneumodermopsis pupula Pruvot-Fol, 1926
- Pneumodermopsis spoeli Newman & greenwood, 1988 – Distribution: Australia.
- Pneumodermopsis teschi van der Spoel, 1973 – distribution: oceanic

Genus Schizobrachium Meisenheimer, 1903

- Schizobrachium polycotylum Meisenheimer, 1903 – distribution: oceanic

Genus Spongiobranchaea d'Orbigny, 1836

- Spongiobranchaea australis d'Orbigny, 1836 – distribution: Argentina, Australia, sub-Antarctic, Antarctica, oceanic, length: 22 mm
- Spongiobranchaea intermedia Pruvot-Fol, 1926 – distribution: oceanic image

Genus Abranchaea Zhan Fu-Sui, 1975

- Abranchaea chinensis Zhan Fu-Sui, 1975

Genus Platybrachium Minichev, 1976
