= List of chaos gods =

Personifications of chaos in mythology

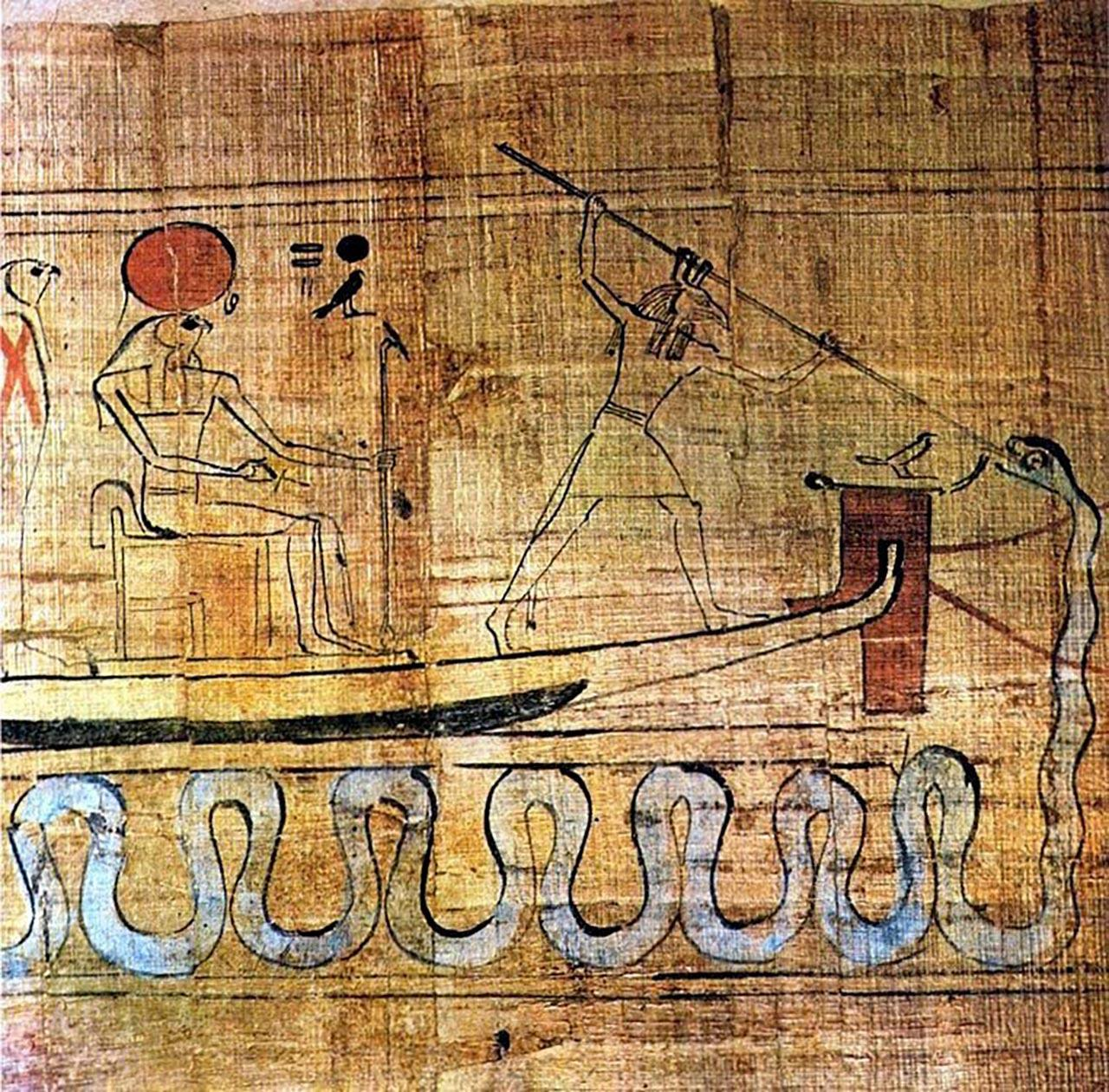
Set spearing the chaos snake Apep

A chaos deity is a deity--a god--who is associated with the world's chaotic elements. There are other entities, often spirits or daemons, who are agents of chaos but, unlike gods(deities), they are not worshiped. Often there also exists a primordial chaos, from which the world arises. This is a morally neutral entity, and while associated with chaos, should not be considered a deity at all.

== Africa and the Middle East ==
=== Afroasiatic Middle East ===
ArabiaFalak

- Hinn and Binn

==== Canaanite ====
- Yam, god of the sea and primordial chaos
- Tannin (monster)

==== Egyptian ====
- Apep--a daemon inhabiting the Egyptian underworld. In the Amduat Apep (also called Horrible-of-Face, because it's bad news to name him) blocks the sun god Re's journey in the 7th hour of the night. If he is able to swallow the boat, all of creation, including the gods themselves will fall into chaos. Seth does kill Apep, but in many more texts, it is Isis who, using magic, defeats him. Apep is depicted as a very long snake with many coils; there ate examples of him being depicted with knives carved into him so that he could not come to life and destroy the deceased.
- Isfet chaos, disorder, and injustice - opposed to Maat
- Nu (mythology) primordial waters
- Set (deity) (More often referred to as Seth). God Upper Egypt, of chaos, storms, and the desert. Seth is associated with all things that challenge ma'at--the concept of order and rightness. Seth killed his slightly older brother Osiris out of jealously, setting in motion the cycle from which Osiris emerged as the god of the underworld. Part of this cycle (which is ongoing) was the invention of mummification by Anubis. For this, he was reviled as a god of evil. Seth went through periods popularity, particularly during the New Kingdom, where we see pharaoh names such as Seti, demonstrating the aggressive nature of Egyptian leadership at that time. As a god of the desert, he was called upon to protect caravans at the oases crossing the Western Desert .

=== Hebrew ===
- Leviathan (is referred to as a reptilian aquatic animal in the Bible, but has also been used as an image of Satan).

==== Mesopotamian ====
- Tiamat

=== West African ===
==== Yoruba ====
- Eṣu, primordial deity of trickery, confusion, crossroads and chaos.

== Western Eurasia ==
=== Celtic ===
- Fomorians – monstrous Irish sea-demons deposed by the Tuatha dé Danann
- Balor

=== Norse-Germanic ===
- Midgard Serpent
- Nidhogg
- Surtr
- Ymir
- Loki

=== Graeco-Roman ===
- Chaos (mythology), the "first thing that came into being" according to Hesiod
- Dionysus, in some cases thought to be a god of chaos
- Eris
- Hydra (mythology)
- Typhon

=== Western Asia ===
==== Anatolian - Hittite ====
- Illuyanka

==== Hindu-Vedic ====
- Vritra

=== Persian Zoroastrian ===
- Angra Mainyu, Zoroastrian god of evil and opposed to Ahura Mazda, god of good

Manichaeism

- Prince of Darkness

== Asia-Pacific / Oceania ==
Japanese

- Amatsumikaboshi

Chinese

- Hundun

== Native Americas ==
Aztec

- Cipactli

Taino

- Juracán

Guarani

- Tau

Lakota

- Unhcegila

== See also ==
- God of destruction (disambiguation)
