= Pneumodermopsis spoeli =

Scientific classification
- Kingdom: Animalia
- Phylum: Mollusca
- Class: Gastropoda
- Clade: Euopisthobranchia
- Order: Pteropoda
- Family: Pneumodermatidae
- Genus: Pneumodermopsis
- Species: P. spoeli

Binomial name
- Pneumodermopsis spoeli Newman, L. and Greenwood, J. G., 1988

Species of mollusc

Pneumodermopsis spoeli is a species of sea angel, a type of small sea snail of sorts, primarily found in deep, cool oceans.

== Description ==
The animal is approximately 2–4 cm in size. It composes of translucent 'wings' as well as tentacles inside of its head. The bottom part of its body is curled and has a 'veil' of sorts at the rear. Juring an RNAextraction, a specimen that was collected had a mesh size of 200 μm.

== Distribution ==
In the northern hemisphere, pneudomodermopsis spoeli has been observed in the Mediterranean Sea, as well as northern European seas. Very few are known to exist. They have been also observed in the southern hemisphere, predominantly in the great barrier reef (Australia).
