= Magu-chan: God of Destruction =

Japanese manga series by Kei Kamiki

- Cover of the first tankōbon volume, featuring Ruru and Magu.

破壊神マグちゃん (Hakaishin Magu-chan)
- Genre: Comedy
- Manga
- Written by: Kei Kamiki
- Published by: Shueisha
- English publisher: NA: Viz Media
- Imprint: Jump Comics
- Magazine: Weekly Shōnen Jump
- Original run: June 22, 2020 – February 7, 2022
- Volumes: 9
- icon

Magu-chan: God of Destruction (Japanese: 破壊神マグちゃん, Hepburn: Hakaishin Magu-chan) is a Japanese manga series written and illustrated by Kei Kamiki. It was serialized in Shueisha's shōnen manga magazine Weekly Shōnen Jump from June 2020 to February 2022, with its chapters collected into nine tankōbon volumes. Viz Media has licensed the series for English release in North America.

== Plot ==
About 600 years ago, the God of Destruction Mag Menuek, one of the Gods of Chaos (混沌の邪神), was summoned to Earth by the Cult of Chaos (混沌教), but was sealed away in a crystal by the Holy Knights (聖騎士). In a remote beachside town in the present day, middle school student Ruru Miyanagi finds and accidentally releases Magu from the sealing crystal. Although Magu tells her of his Godly status, Ruru is unimpressed and the two form an unlikely relationship; the lonely Ruru looks at him as a friend of equal status, while Magu considers her his lowly human disciple. Having sensed Magu, the God of Madness Naputaaku breaks out of his sealing crystal and the two continue their rivalry to rule humans, although both have lost most of their power. After learning that they both hate Magu, Naputaaku and Ruru's friend Ren Fujisawa form an alliance. The young Holy Knight Izuma Kisaragi makes occasional appearances in the town trying to stop Magu from taking it over. Izuma is often accompanied by Uneras, the God of Providence who betrayed her fellow Gods of Chaos and sided with the Holy Knights, leading to their sealing 600 years earlier.

== Characters ==
Ruru Miyanagi (宮薙流々)
A middle school student, she is kind and carefree but gullible and a little dense. Her father died when she was young, and her mother Rui (涙依) is rarely home as she works on the other side of the sea, thus Ruru is often lonely.
Mag Menuek (マグ = メヌエク)
A God of Chaos, ranked in the First Pillar, and the God of Destruction, who has massive destructive abilities. But as a result of having been sealed in the crystal, his physical body is much smaller; resembling an octopus, and his powers much weaker. His goal is to regain his powers and amass a following like the former Cult of Chaos, which he thinks he is doing by having others sign their name in "The Book of the Destruction Disciples' Blood Oaths" (really Ruru's old BFF book).
Ren Fujisawa (藤沢錬)
Ruru's friend and classmate who has a crush on her. Unlike Ruru, Ren is suspicious of the Gods and vows to protect her. He tries to get closer to Ruru and ask her out on dates, but most are ruined as she always brings Magu along. In order to keep Magu quiet about his crush, Ren is the first to sign "loyalty" to Magu in his BFF book. His family owns and runs a local restaurant, Fujisawa Eatery (ふじさわ食堂).
Naputaaku (ナプターク)
A God of Chaos, ranked in the Fifth Pillar. He is the God of Madness, earning him the nickname "Naputaaku the Mad", and has the power to control living beings by instilling madness in their minds. He too has lost his size and powers because of a sealing crystal, and now looks like a starfish. Using his ability, he is only able to recruit an army of 100 hermit crabs to do his bidding. Naputaaku becomes friendly with Ren and starts working at his family's restaurant, where he develops a love for cooking.
Uneras (ウーネラス)
A God of Chaos, ranked in the Fourth Pillar, who betrayed them and sided with the Holy Knights, leading to Magu and the other Gods being sealed in the crystals she created. She is the God of Providence, earning her the nickname "Providential Uneras", and can infuse objects with magic by altering the laws of nature. Unlike Magu and Naputaaku, Uneras is knowledgeable and curious about modern human society. She fakes being caught by the Knights so that she can enjoy the luxuries they provide her in exchange for her protecting them from the other Gods. As her real body is locked up in the Holy Knights' headquarters, she appears as a clione that hides in a sleeve on the leg of Izuma's pigeon.
Izuma Kisaragi (イズマ・キサラギ)
A 16-year-old descendant of the Holy Knights from another country. He has sworn to eradicate the Gods of Chaos and can detect the "aura of chaos" they give off. Izuma is under the impression that Ruru is under the control of the evil Magu and repeatedly tries to save her. He has a homing pigeon that acts as a lookout. Unable to beat Magu, Izuma eventually enrolls at Ruru's middle school to keep an eye on him, despite being high school age.
Yuika Oze (尾瀬唯歌)
Ruru's rambunctious and fun-loving friend and classmate. She loves to tease and is labelled an "innocent brat," who is without malice or regret. This is proven when she is found to be the only one unaffected by Zonze Ge's power. As a result, she takes Zonze Ge as her pet.
Kikyo Komiyama (小深山桔梗)
Ruru's friend and classmate who is obsessed with aliens, cryptids and the occult. She immediately recognizes Magu and the other Gods as not of this world and is interested in researching them. She was the only member of the school's Occult Research Club until her friends and Magu join to save it from disbandment. She takes Gu La home as a pet.
Zonze Ge (ゾンゼ = ゲ)
A being of the same race as the Gods of Chaos, but "undeserving" of being ranked as a God. He is constantly insecure and depressed and his power instills these feelings into any being that touches him, earning him the nickname "Zonze Ge of Despair". Because he looks like a sea urchin ("uni" in Japanese), Yuika gives him the nickname "Unisuke".
Gu La (グ = ラ)
A being of the same race as the Gods of Chaos, but not ranked as a God, although he does desire the title. He looks like a crab and is known as "Gu La the Adamantine". His power allows him to regenerate and strengthen his physical form and transform his claws into various items.
Muscar (ミュスカー)
A God of Chaos, ranked in the Third Pillar, and the leader of the Chaos Cult in the modern day. His power allows him to predict and adjust the future, earning him the nicknames "Muscar of Fate" and "The Prophet". Although he predicted Uneras' betrayal, he accepted the sealing so that he could break out first and restore his power while hiding. Muscar can take any form he desires, but took on the appearance of a human boy to avoid detection by Uneras, though he does wear robes resembling a squid. He hates humans and his plan is to have the Gods of Chaos take over the world once again.
Nosu Koshu (ノス = コシュ)
A God of Chaos, ranked in the Sixth Pillar, who is extremely lazy and always sleeping. Nicknamed "Nosu Koshu of Illusions", she has the power to put living beings to sleep and control their dreams, which she feeds on. Nosu Koshu is initially freed from her sealing crystal by Muscar to aid him in taking over the world.

== Production ==
External videos
- Promotional video for the series.

Magu-chan: God of Destruction is Kei Kamiki's (上木敬) first serialized work. After having drawn a bunch of one-shots for special issues of Weekly Shōnen Jump, but no success getting published in the main magazine, Kamiki's editor Monji suggested he choose a genre he likes for a new work. A fan of series like Pokémon, Shin Megami Tensei: Devil Children, Medabots and Gotcha Force, the author decided to draw something about a small creature companion. The one-shot version of Magu-chan: God of Destruction was rejected by Weekly Shōnen Jump but published in Jump Giga 2019 Summer Vol. 3. Kamiki was credited by the name Keiji Kinoshita (木下敬次) for the one-shot.

His editor suggested he rework the manga, draw three chapters and try to get it serialized in Weekly Shōnen Jump one more time. Kamiki made Magu rounder and said the BFF book was his editor's idea. Magu-chan: God of Destruction was picked up for serialization. The author said he came up with a pen name to use when he got serialized in Jump, but his editor rejected it. After working with Monji for over eight years, Kamiki's editor changed during the making of volume two. His second editor, Ishikawa, left around September 2021.

Kamiki acknowledged that the series has elements of "a certain fictional mythos" but said it is really "a mishmash of all sorts of things" and he wants readers to treat it as an "entirely separate" work. He described Magu as something like "what you get when you mix rabbit ears, a pancake devilfish, and the disposition of a cat into one creature." He said that Naputaaku holds the record for the character he can draw the fastest, at about 30 seconds. Kamiki revealed that the character Uneras is based on a lot of things, but became a clione "because of Crypto's drones," which is presumably a reference to Apex Legends. He also explained that the spells in the series do not actually mean anything, but are "just stuff that sounds like spells."

== Publication ==
Written and illustrated by Kei Kamiki, Magu-chan: God of Destruction was serialized in Shueisha's shōnen manga magazine Weekly Shōnen Jump from June 22, 2020, to February 7, 2022. A 41-page additional chapter was published in the Spring 2022 issue of Jump Giga on May 2, 2022. Publisher Shueisha collected the individual chapters into nine tankōbon volumes between November 4, 2020, and June 3, 2022. Both Shueisha and Viz Media began releasing the series in English the same day it began in Japan, the former on its Manga Plus website and application. Viz Media has also licensed the collected volumes for digital-only release, with the first volume released on September 28, 2021.

=== Volume list ===
No.	Original release date	Original ISBN	English release date	English ISBN
1	November 4, 2020	978-4-08-882512-0	September 28, 2021	978-1-9747-2230-3
Chapter 1: "The Girl Ruru Miyanagi" (少女宮薙流々, Shōjo Miyanagi Ruru); Chapter 2: "The Boy Ren Fujisawa" (少年藤沢錬, Shōnen Fujisawa Ren); Chapter 3: "Naputaaku the Mad" (『狂乱』のナプターク, Kyōran no Naputāku); Chapter 4: "The God of Destruction's First Errand" (破壊神はじめてのおつかい, Hakaishin Hajimete nō Tsukai); Chapter 5: "Victims' Alliance" (被害者同盟, Higaisha Dōmei); Chapter 6: "The Ruler of the Night Sky" (夜空の支配者, Yozora no Shihai-sha); Chapter 7: "The Holy Knight Izuma Kisaragi" (聖騎士イズマ・キサラギ, Hijiri Kishi Izuma Kisaragi)
2	January 4, 2021	978-4-08-882531-1	December 28, 2021	978-1-9747-3094-0
Chapter 8: "A Scorcher of a Duel" (焦熱の決闘, Shōnetsu no Kettō); Chapter 9: "Ruler of the Sea" (海原を統べるもの, Unabara o Suberu Mono); Chapter 10: "Naputaaku's Counterattack" (ナプタークの逆襲, Naputāku no Gyakushū); Chapter 11: "Troublemaker Yuika Oze" (悪童 尾瀬唯歌, Akudō Oze Yuika); Chapter 12: "Pursuer Kikyo Komiyama" (探求者 小深山桔梗, Tankyūsha Komiyama Kikyō); Chapter 13: "Providential Uneras" (『摂理』のウーネラス, Setsuri no Ūnerasu); Chapter 14: "A Scream of Chaos Echoes Through the School" (学び舎に響く混沌の呼び声, Manabiya ni Hibiku Konton no Yobigoe); Chapter 15: "The Blood-Soaked Pitch-Dark Hound" (血濡れし漆黒の猟犬, Chi Nureshi Shikkoku no Ryōken); Chapter 16: "The House Where the Young Girl Sleeps" (少女の眠る家, Shōjo no Nemuru Ie)
3	March 4, 2021	978-4-08-882578-6	March 22, 2022	978-1-9747-3175-6
Chapter 17: "A Chaos-Inducing Illness" (混沌をもたらす病, Konton o Motarasu Yamai); Chapter 18: "Night Parade of a Hundred Demon Destruction Disciples" (破滅使徒 百鬼夜行, Hametsu Shito Hyakkiyakō); Chapter 19: "A Day in the Life of the Frenzied Troops" (狂乱の軍勢の一日, Kyōran no Gunzei no Tsuitachi); Chapter 20: "Autumn Training" (修行の秋, Shūgyō no Aki); Chapter 21: "Three Wicked Gods Creeping at Night" (暗夜に蠢く三邪神, An'ya ni Ugomeku San Jashin); Chapter 22: "The Boy's Secret Plan" (少年の謀略, Shōnen no Bōryaku); Chapter 23: "The Gambling Den of Madness" (狂乱の鉄火場, Kyōran no Tekkaba); Chapter 24: "The North Wind and Sun, Part 1" (北風と太陽(前編), Kitakaze to Taiyō (Zenpen); Chapter 25: "The North Wind and Sun, Part 2" (北風と太陽(後編), Kitakaze to Taiyō (Kōhen)
4	June 4, 2021	978-4-08-882686-8	June 28, 2022	978-1-9747-3319-4
Chapter 26: "The Mom, Rui Miyanagi" (母 宮薙涙依); Chapter 27:"A Destructive First Shrine Visit" (破滅の新春初詣); Chapter 28:"Lucky Beans" (福豆と鬼); Chapter 29:"Zonze Ge of Despair" (『暗澹』のゾンゼ = ゲ); Chapter 30:"The Capriccio of a Sweet Day" (甘き日の狂想曲); Chapter 31:"Gu La the Adamantine" (『金剛』のグ = ラ); Chapter 32:"Fearsome Dark Hot Pot Hell" (恐怖の暗黒鍋地獄); Chapter 33:"Encounter in a Winter Wonderland" (銀世界の邂逅, Ginsekai no Kaigō); Chapter 34:"Muscar of Fate" (『運命』のミュスカー)
5	August 4, 2021	978-4-08-882733-9	September 27, 2022	978-1-9747-3514-3
Chapter 35: "The God of Destruction's First Sleepover" (破壊神はじめてのおとまり); Chapter 36: "The Melancholy of Zonze Ge" (ゾンゼ = ゲの憂鬱); Chapter 37: "Flowers of Chaos in Full Bloom" (咲き誇る混沌の華); Chapter 38: "Naputaaku Runs Away From Home for the First Time Ever" (ナプターク はじめての家出); Chapter 39: "He Who Rules the School" (学び舎の頂に立つ者); Chapter 40: "The Teacher Kanade Akamura" (教師 閼伽村奏); Chapter 41: "Forbidden Golem" (禁忌の魔術人形); Chapter 42: "Providence vs. Fate" (『摂理』対『運命』); Chapter 43: "The Day of Extinguishing Light" (灯火の尽きる日)
6	October 4, 2021	978-4-08-882791-9	December 27, 2022	978-1-9747-3594-5
Chapter 44: "Madness Vs. Fate" (『狂乱』対『運命』); Chapter 45: "The Three Little Wicked Gods" (三匹の小邪神); Chapter 46: "Special Lecture at the Holy Knighthood Branch Office" (聖騎士団支部特別講義); Chapter 47: "A Desperate Struggle in Rainy Weather" (長雨の死闘); Chapter 48: "A Fatherly Figure" (父なる存在); Chapter 49: "The Boundary Between Us and the Stars" (星辰流るる彼我の境界); Chapter 50: "Fate Vs. Destruction" (『運命』VS『破滅』); Chapter 51: "The Town Sleeping in Mist" (霧に眠る町, Kiri ni Nemuru Machi); Chapter 52: "The Conclusion of the Gods" (神々の決着, Kamigami no Ketchaku)
7	January 4, 2022	978-4-08-882880-0	March 28, 2023	978-1-9747-3819-9
Chapter 53: "The Phantom of the Haunted Housing Complex" (幽霊団地の怪); Chapter 54: "An Oceanside Teahouse Rising From the Burning Sand" (熱砂に聳える海の茶寮); Chapter 55: "A Story of Wicked Gods Adrift" (邪神漂流譚); Chapter 56: "Nosu Koshu of Illusions" (『夢幻』のノス = コシュ); Chapter 57: "The Minion B.S." (眷属チヌ); Chapter 58: "The Dawning of the Crazy Cafe" (狂乱食堂の夜明け); Chapter 59: "Best Friend, Part 1" (親友（前編）); Chapter 60: "Best Friend, Part 2" (親友（後編）); Chapter 61: "A Destructive Luncheon" (破滅的午餐)
8	March 4, 2022	978-4-08-883033-9	June 27, 2023	978-1-9747-3969-1
Chapter 62: "A Thrilling Sports Festival of Chaos" (血湧き肉躍る混沌闘技祭); Chapter 63: "From the Ocean, With Love" (海原より愛を込めて); Chapter 64: "Muscar and the Sealing Bracelet" (ミュスカーと封印の腕輪); Chapter 65: "The Mysterious Successor" (謎めく継承者); Chapter 66: "Ninitsy the Astral" (亜空のニニツイ); Chapter 67: "What Are the Gods Seeing When They Laugh?" (神は何を見て哂う); Chapter 68: "The Ten Divine Generals of the Holy Knighthood" (聖騎士十天将); Chapter 69: "Mission: Rescue the Disciple of Destruction" (破滅使徒奪還作戦); Chapter 70: "Providence Vs. Destruction" (『摂理』対『破滅』)
9	June 3, 2022	978-4-08-883095-7	—	—
Chapter 71: "The Evil God of Heart" (心の邪神); Chapter 72: "An Errand on a Holy Night" (聖夜の御使い); Chapter 73: "Eternal Peace" (永久の平穏); Chapter 74: "Yupisusu the Eternal" (久遠のユピスス); Chapter 75: "The Observer of Time" (時の観測者); Chapter 76: "Magu-chan: God of Destruction" (破壊神マグちゃん); Final Chapter: "He Waits Dreaming" (夢見るままに待ちいたり); Special Chapter: "The Boy's Mad Love" (少年の狂恋)

== Other media ==
The first three chapters of Magu-chan: God of Destruction received a motion comic adaptation, where voice actors, music and sound effects are heard as the manga images appear on screen. The episodes were uploaded to Jump Comic's official YouTube channel, with the first chapter uploaded in two parts on November 18, 2020, and November 19, 2020, and the second and third chapters uploaded on January 6, 2021, and January 7, 2021, respectively.

The first newly created merchandise for the series were mini plushies of Magu-chan, which were released on July 19, 2021, and sold out immediately.

== Reception ==
Magu-chan: God of Destruction was nominated for Best Print Manga at the 2021 Next Manga Awards, where it placed 15th out of 50 nominees. The series came in fourth place in AnimeJapan's 2022 poll of manga series people want to see receive an anime adaptation.

Reiichi Narima of Real Sound described the series as a gag comedy set in real life that draws from the Cthulhu Mythos, and compared it to Fujiko Fujio's Little Ghost Q-Taro. He said that while this might seem like a surprising combination, it works in the same way other Japanese series have yōkai and other monsters happily interacting with children. Narima called the scenery of the rural seaside town where the manga takes place "fresh" and a "hidden highlight." He called Magu-chan: God of Destruction an "oasis for the mind" after reading its tense Weekly Shōnen Jump battle manga counterparts Jujutsu Kaisen and Chainsaw Man, and expressed his wish that it will continue for a long time. Comic Book Resources' Hannah Collins also compared Magu to H. P. Lovecraft's Cthulhu.

Reviewing the early chapters, The Fandom Post's Antonio Mireles wrote that Kamiki chose a weird mixture for a comedy, but this "mixture of various tropes of dark comedy, with hints of tragedy, romance, and battle manga" works wonders. He praised the cast and their enjoyable interactions; the relationship between Ruru and Magu, and Ren for providing an outsider's view of their uncanny relationship. Mireles cited the art as the manga's greatest challenge: "There are instances where Kei Kamiki can draw charming images or frightful terrifying images that will shake you to your core. And then there are many moments where it feels like its a rough sketch that should have been worked on a bit more." However, in a review of chapter nine, he stated that the art saw a massive upgrade.
