= Spongiobranchaea australis =

Scientific classification
- Kingdom: Animalia
- Phylum: Mollusca
- Class: Gastropoda
- Clade: Euopisthobranchia
- Order: Pteropoda
- Family: Pneumodermatidae
- Genus: Spongiobranchaea
- Species: S. australis

Binomial name
- Spongiobranchaea australis d'Orbigny, 1836

Synonyms
- Pneumodermon dumerilli S. P. Woodward, 1854; Spongiobranchia australis d'Orbigny, 1836

Species of mollusc

Spongiobranchaea australis is a species of sea angel, a form of sea-slug plankton. It has a partially transparent body with small "wings" that it uses to swim in its habitat. It is classified as a pteropod.

== Distribution ==
Spongiobranchaea australis is found in austral waters near the Antarctic region, in the southern hemisphere. The species is primarily concentrated in areas near Australia and New Zealand. The areas they live in are pelagic and temperate; 2 °C - 13 °C.

== Description ==
The average size was recorded to be 22 mm. Regular sexually active males and females vary around 3–5 mm. The largest ever individual was found to be 2.2 cm.
