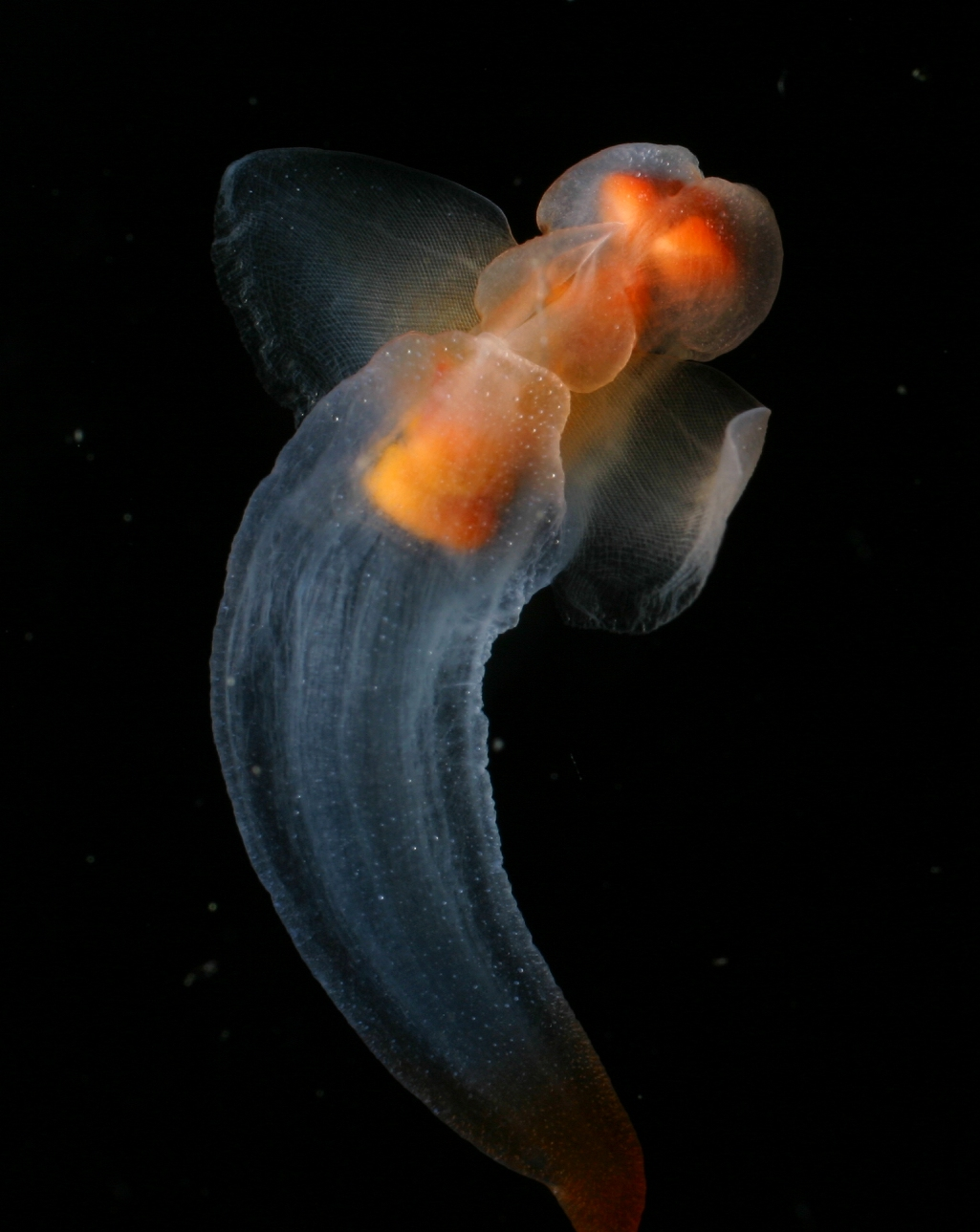

Scientific classification
- Kingdom: Animalia
- Phylum: Mollusca
- Class: Gastropoda
- Clade: Euopisthobranchia
- Order: Pteropoda
- Family: Clionidae
- Genus: Clione
- Species: C. limacina

Binomial name
- Clione limacina (Phipps, 1774)

Synonyms
- Clione borealis (Pallas, 1774); Trichocyclus dumerilii Eschscholtz, 1825

= Clione limacina =

Species of gastropod

Clione limacina, known as the naked sea butterfly, sea angel, and common clione, is a sea angel (pelagic sea slug) found from the surface to greater than 500 m (1,600 ft) depth. It lives in the Arctic Ocean and cold regions of the North Atlantic Ocean. It was first described by Friderich Martens in 1676 and became the first gymnosomatous (without a shell) "pteropod" to be described.

== Subspecies ==
- Clione limacina australis (Bruguière, 1792)
- Clione limacina limacina (Phipps, 1774)

== Distribution ==
Clione limacina is found in cold waters of the Arctic Ocean and North Atlantic Ocean, ranging south at least to the Sargasso Sea. There are three other species in the genus, which formerly were included in C. limacina (either as subspecies, variants or subpopulations). These are C. elegantissima of the cold North Pacific (at least north to the Gulf of Alaska; the Beaufort Sea is inhabited by C. limacina), C. okhotensis of the Okhotsk Sea (where it overlaps with C. elegantissima), and C. antarctica of Antarctic waters.

== Description ==
There are two subspecies that differentiate in body length. The northern subspecies lives in colder water, matures at 3 cm (1.2 in) and can reach a size of 7–8.5 cm (2.8–3.3 in). This makes it by far the largest sea angel. In comparison, the size of the southern subspecies is 1.2 cm (0.5 in), C. elegantissima is up to 3 cm (1.2 in), C. okhotensis up to 0.8 cm (0.3 in), and C. antarctica up to 3 cm (1.2 in).

C. limacina swims by beating its two wings to move upwards or maintain itself at a constant depth. To keep itself upright during swimming, it uses two statocyst gravity-sensing organs that correct it to an upright posture using its tail.

== Ecology ==
Clione limacina inhabits both the epipelagic and mesopelagic regions of the water column.

=== Feeding habits ===
Adults feed in a predator-prey relationship almost exclusively on the sea butterflies of the genus Limacina: on Limacina helicina and on Limacina retroversa. The feeding process of Clione limacina is somewhat extraordinary. The buccal ("mouth") apparatus consists of three pairs of buccal cones. These tentacles grab the shell of Limacina helicina. When the prey is in the right position, with its shell opening facing the radula of Clione limacina, it then grasps the prey with its chitinous hooks, everted from hook sacs. Then it extracts the body completely out of its shell and swallows it whole.

Adult Limacina are absent for much of the year, leaving C. limacina without access to their main food source. A study of 138 C. limacina during a period without adult Limacina found that the stomachs of 24 contained remains of amphipods and 3 contained remains of calanoids. This temporary prey change may allow them to survive in periods of starvation, although the species can survive for one year without food. Under such exceptional starvation in the laboratory the length of slugs have decreased on average from 22.4 to 12 mm (0.88 to 0.47 in).

The earliest larvae stages of C. limacina feed on phytoplankton, but from the later laval stage this changes to Limacina. The development of these two species is parallel and small C. limacina feed on Limacina of a size, while large C. limacina avoid small Limacina (including its larvae).

=== Life cycle ===
In Svalbard, the life cycle of C. limacina appears to be at least 2 years. It is a hermaphrodite and observations suggest this is simultaneous. It breeds during the spring and summer, and the eggs are about 0.12 mm (4.7 thou).

Clione limacina is a prey of planktonic feeders, such as the baleen whales, which historically led to sailors naming it "whale-food". Some fishes are also its predators. For example, the Chum Salmon, Oncorhynchus keta, is a major predator of sea angels.

== Cultural significance ==
While sea angels are relatively obscure in Western countries, they are extremely well-known in Japanese culture. As a result, two creatures from the Pokémon franchise, Manaphy and Phione, are based on the clione, as well as two creatures from the Digimon franchise, MarineAngemon and Ukkomon. However, Californian band glass beach seems to use a drawing of a Clione in the album cover for Plastic Death. Additionally, the game Dave The Diver has cliones as both regular creatures and a boss. Not only that, Cli-One and all of her variants from The Battle Cats are based on this specific species of clione. Same goes with at least one Angel from Neon Genesis Evangelion. Disney character Ortho Shroud from game Twisted Wonderland is referred to as a sea clione by his upperclassman Floyd Leech.
