= Charles Haskell Danforth =

American anatomist

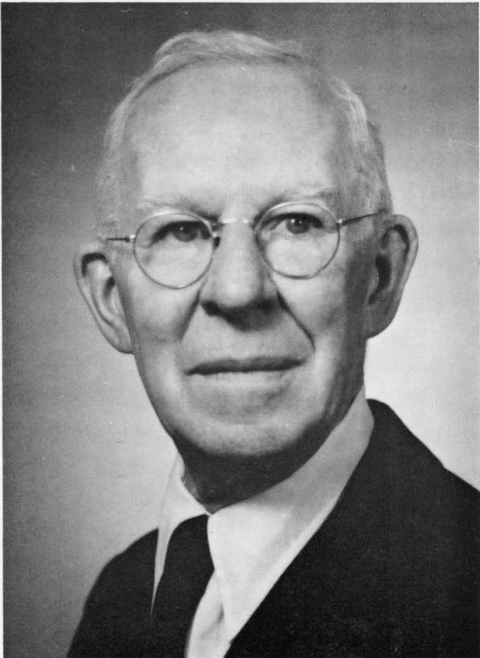
Charles Haskell Danforth

Charles Haskell Danforth (30 November 1883 – 10 January 1969) was an American naturalist, anatomist, researcher, and professor at Washington University Medical School, University of Montana, and Stanford University. He spent the majority of his life conducting research on the characteristics of a wide array of organisms and took a special interest in problems of heredity and comparative anatomy.

== Early life ==
Danforth was born in Oxford, Maine on November 30, 1883 to James and Mary Haskell. His childhood years were spent working on the family farm and attending primary school in Norway, Maine. Growing up, he had developed an interest in botany and zoology, which only grew when his uncle, Frank Danforth, passed on two copies of Darwin's Animals and Plants under Domestication to him at the age of twelve. Within a year of receiving these books, Danforth had observed variation in the color of the anthers in plants of the saxifrage family, and later went on to publish "A Dimorphism in Tiarella cordifolia" in 1911, highlighting these observations made in his youth.

His father was close with members of the National Academy of Sciences, namely Professor Sidney I. Smith and the brother-in-law of Professor A.E. Verrill. Charles used this connection to his advantage and wrote to Professor Verrill, seeking advice about becoming a naturalist. He received a rather unexpected response: Verrill told him that he should not become a naturalist "unless you can't help it." In spite of this response, thirteen year-old Charles knew that he couldn't help it, and this decision to become a naturalist shaped the rest of his life.

== Education ==
Danforth's strong interest in natural science was evident when he started his formal education at the Norway Liberal Institute in Maine. He flourished in biology and classical studies, and he became known for his observation abilities and meticulous note-taking, skills that would characterize his later scientific work.

Danforth originally planned to study medicine when he enrolled at Tufts College (now Tufts University) in 1904, but his passion for biology caused him to redirect his focus towards anatomy and zoology. While at Tufts, he studied under many renowned professors including Herbert E. Walker, who introduced Danforth to formal biological research and experimental methods. After earning his Bachelor of Arts (B.A.) in 1908, Danforth continued his education at Tufts, where he eventually earned his Master of Arts (M.A.) in 1910. During his pursuit of the Master's, shortly after the completion of is Bachelor's, Danforth received an offer from Washington University Medical School's anatomy department chair Professor Robert J. Terry to instruct for the Department of Anatomy for $800 per year. His interests in variation and morphology, topics that would define his academic career, were evident in his master's thesis. It is worth noting that during his time at Tufts, Danforth had published his first three scientific papers; one about a new type of pteropod, one about variation in daisies, and another about Spirogyra.

After graduating from Tufts, Danforth completed his doctoral studies at Washington University in St. Louis, Missouri, collaborating closely with Professor R. J. Terry. Danforth conducted an in-depth study of the comparative anatomy of Polyodon (paddlefish) under Terry's mentorship, culminating a dissertation that was rigorous in both morphology and phylogenetic analysis. He received his Ph.D. in 1912, and his research at the time combined more recent influences from evolutionary biology and heredity with more traditional anatomical training. This combination of topics would later be a defining feature of his work.

Danforth's education gave him a strong foundation in both the new techniques of experimental biology and the empirical traditions of descriptive anatomy. He was able to broaden the scope of his research and bridge disciplines, spanning the subjects of comparative zoology, genetics, human anatomy, and anthropometry.

== Career ==
Over the course of his career, Danforth's studies focused on comparative morphology, heredity, and anatomical variation, particularly in vertebrates, and published 125 scientific papers. To establish himself as a forward-thinking scientist at the intersection of multiple disciplines, he began to integrate genetics into his anatomical work, which was a relatively new science at the time.

After getting his doctorate at Washington University, Danforth married science teacher Florence Wenonah Garrison in 1914. She too was an academic and was a member of both the Society of Daughters of the American Revolution and the Daughters of the American Colonists. She also contributed to the Smithsonian Institution, writing historical articles for them to publish. They had three sons over the course of their marriage.

In 1917, Danforth decided to take on a temporary position teaching ornithology at the Flathead Lake Biological Station of the University of Montana. His lifelong passion for natural history and his connection to field-based biological research were strengthened by this brief but influential experience.

In 1921, Danforth relocated to Stanford University when he accepted Arthur W. Meyer's invitation to join the faculty. It was during this time that he was sitting in a theatre and noticed the hairy hands of a person seated in front of him. After comparing his own hair distribution to the other person's, Danforth took up a study of hair growth patterning on the back of the hands and fingers and published a number of papers on this topic. Shortly after publishing his findings, Danforth was promoted to full professor in 1923. He remained in this position until his retirement in 1949 and published an additional 87 scientific papers during his time at Stanford, some concerning hair and others concerning hereditary patterns in rats, chickens, pheasants, and cats. He thrived as a researcher and teacher at Stanford as he was provided with a stable institutional home that supported his long-term independent research.

During World War II, in 1942, Danforth was elected to the United States National Academy of Sciences, and in 1944, he was elected into the American Philosophical Society. After the war, he conducted a statistical analysis of physical measurements taken from more than 104,000 American soldiers. This sparked his interest in human anatomical variation and resulted in significant work. He made a substantial contribution to the field of human morphometrics by using this massive dataset to examine changes in stature and body proportions over time.

After his retirement in 1949, Danforth continued his research at Stanford for another twenty years. He remained involved in his research until two years before his death. His lifelong commitment to biology is demonstrated by the 1967 publication of his final paper. While still having strong ties to the university, Charles Haskell Danforth died on January 10, 1969, at Stanford University Hospital.

Charles Haskell Danforth worked in fields that overlapped with the eugenics movement. He focused mainly on human heredity, human evolution, and the frequency of mutations in humans. Some of his research concerned variation in the musculus palmaris longus in different races, variation of hair characteristics in different races, and traits revealed by skin transplants in different races. He also conducted research on different races of domestic fowl and the variation in their plumage. His work was scientific as opposed to being ideological, and there is no indication that he used his research to promote discriminatory practices. He participated in the American Eugenics Society along with a number of other professional societies, such as the American Philosophical Society, the American Society of Naturalists (president, 1941-1943), the American Society of Zoologists, the California Academy of Sciences, the California Academy of Medicine, the Genetics Society of America, the Society for Developmental Biology, and the Society for the Study of Evolution. Additionally, he was elected to the National Academy of Sciences in 1942.
