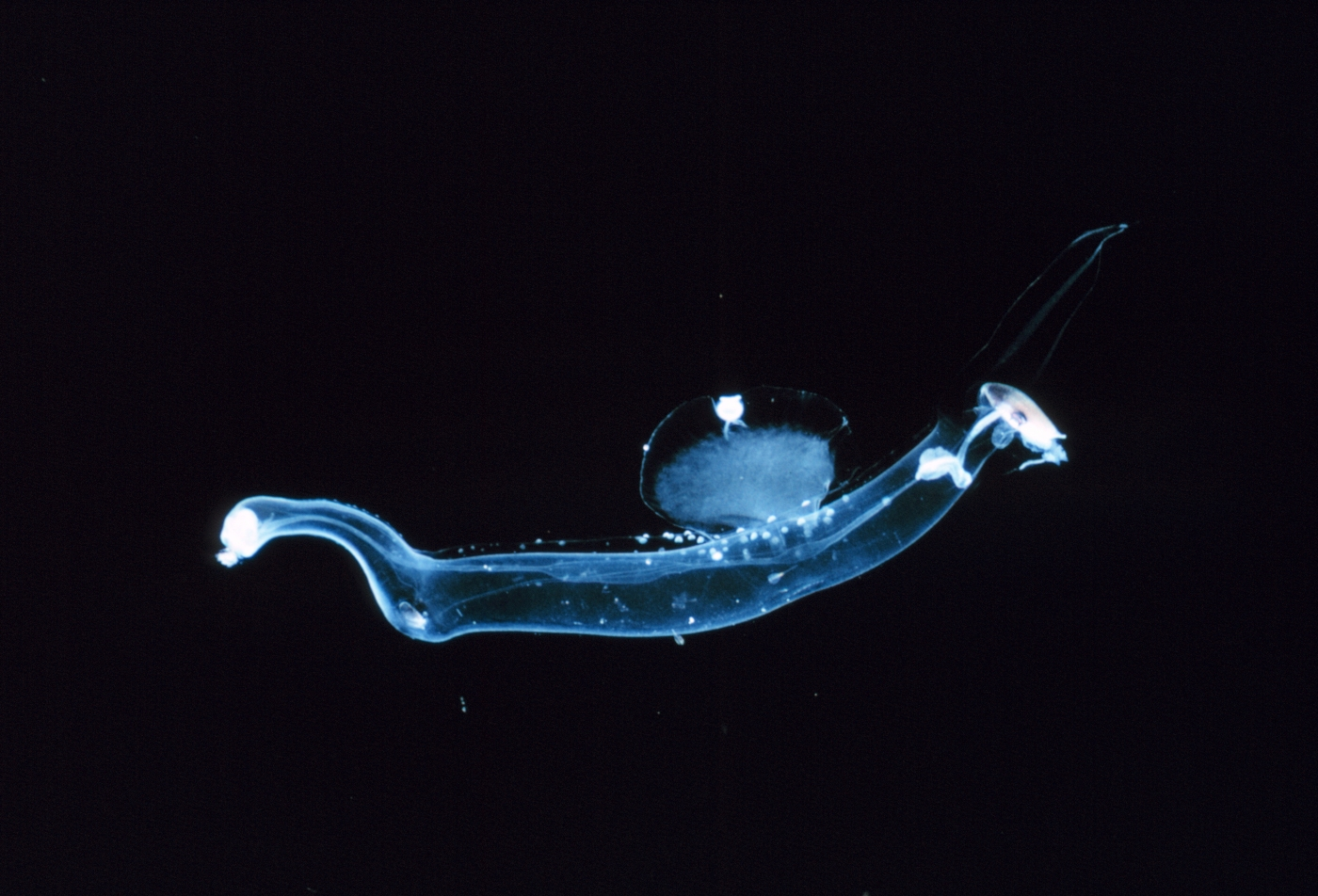

Scientific classification
- Kingdom: Animalia
- Phylum: Mollusca
- Class: Gastropoda
- Subclass: Caenogastropoda
- Order: Littorinimorpha
- Superfamily: Pterotracheoidea
- Family: Pterotracheidae; Rafinesque, 1814

Genera
- See text

Synonyms
- Firolinae Rafinesque, 1815

= Pterotracheidae =

Family of gastropods

Pterotracheidae is a family of medium-sized to large floating sea snails, pelagic gastropod molluscs. They are in the superfamily Pterotracheoidea along with two other similar pelagic families, the Atlantidae and the Carinariidae.

These pelagic snails are not at all closely related to the pelagic heterobranch opistobranchs such as the sea angels and sea butterflies. They are in the clade Littorinimorpha, and as such they are related to such families as the tritons (Ranellidae) and the tun shells (Tonnidae), in the clade Caenogastropoda.

According to taxonomy of the Gastropoda by Bouchet & Rocroi (2005) the family Pterotracheidae has no subfamilies.

== Genera ==
Genera within the family Pterotracheidae include:

- Firoloida Lesueur, 1817
- Pterotrachea Forsskål, 1775

Genera brought into synonymy

- Euryops Tesch, 1906: synonym of Pterotrachea Forsskål in Niebuhr, 1775
- Firola Bruguière, 1791: synonym of Pterotrachea Forsskål in Niebuhr, 1775
- Firolella Troschel, 1855: synonym of Firoloida Lesueur, 1817
- Heterodens Bonnevie, 1920: synonym of Pterotrachea Forsskål in Niebuhr, 1775
- Tholapex di Geronimo, 1974: synonym of Firoloida Lesueur, 1817
