= Herbert E. Walter =

American geneticist

Herbert Eugene Walter (1867–1945), was a prominent biologist, author, Professor at Brown University and researcher.

Herbert Walter was born in Burke, Vermont in 1867. He attended the Lyndon Institute, and then graduated from Bates College in Maine in 1892. He next received a M.A. from Brown University in 1893 and then studied at the University of Freiburg. From 1894 to 1904 he taught biology. In 1906 he received a Ph.D. from Harvard University. Walter came to Brown as assistant professor of biology. He was promoted to associate professor in 1913 and professor in 1923. Walter published many books, including, Studies in Animal Life, (1901), Genetics: An Introduction To the Study of Heredity (1913), The Human Skeleton (1913), and Biology of the Vertebrates. With his wife, Alice Hall Lyndon, he wrote Wild Birds in City Parks. Walter was director of research for the Federal Bureau of Fisheries at Woods Hole, and conducted a course in field zoology for teachers of biology at the Marine Biological Institute of the Brooklyn Institute of Arts and Sciences at Cold Spring Harbor, Long Island. He was assistant director of the Institute from 1917 to 1926. Walter Hall was named after the Professor in 1959 it is now home to the department of Ecology and Evolutionary Biology on the Brown campus at 80 Waterman Street.
