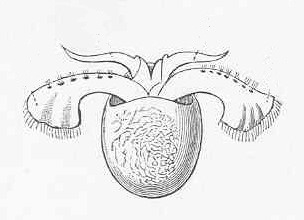

Scientific classification
- Kingdom: Animalia
- Phylum: Mollusca
- Class: Gastropoda
- Clade: Euopisthobranchia
- Order: Pteropoda
- Family: Hydromylidae
- Genus: Hydromyles; Gistel, 1848
- Species: H. globulosus

Binomial name
- Hydromyles globulosus (Rang, 1825)

Synonyms
- List: Genus: Psyche Rang, 1825 (Preocc.); Euribia Rang, 1827 (Preocc.); Anopsia Gistel, 1848; Philopseudes Gistel, 1848; Halopsyche Keferstein, 1862; Theceuribia Keferstein, 1862; Halopsyche A. E. Verrill, 1880; Verrillopsyche Cossmann, 1900; Species: Psyche globulosa Rang, 1825; Anopsia gaudichaudi (Gray, 1850); Euribia gaudichaudi Gray, 1850; Euribia gaudichaudii (Missp.); Euribia globulosa (Rang, 1825); Eurybia gaudichaudi (Gray, 1850); Halopsyche gaudichaudi (Gray, 1850); Halopsyche gaudichaudii (Missp.); Halopsyche globulosa (Rang, 1825); Hydromyles gaudichaudii (Gray, 1850); Hydromyles globulosa (Missp.); Theceurybia gaudichaudii (Missp.)

= Hydromyles globulosus =

Only species in the gastropod family Hydromylidae

Hydromyles globulosus is the only species of sea slug in the genus Hydromyles, and the only member of the family Hydromylidae. It is commonly found in the Indo-Pacific Ocean. The species is pelagic, carnivorous and viviparous. They are unique among sea angels in that they brood their young. Their young develop within the body of their mother, and emerge as juveniles. They are capable of producing an ink-like substance, which they release if disturbed.

== Appearance ==
H. globulosus has a distinct head, round body, and long tentacles. The body is translucent but the internal organs are bright orange or yellow in colour. Besides tentacles, it has two "wings" derived from its modified foot.

== Distribution and ecology ==
H. globulosus is found in the eastern Indo-Pacific Ocean, but its range is strongly influenced by currents. It is frequently found in large numbers.

== In popular culture ==
The species was featured in the 2009 video game Endless Ocean 2.
