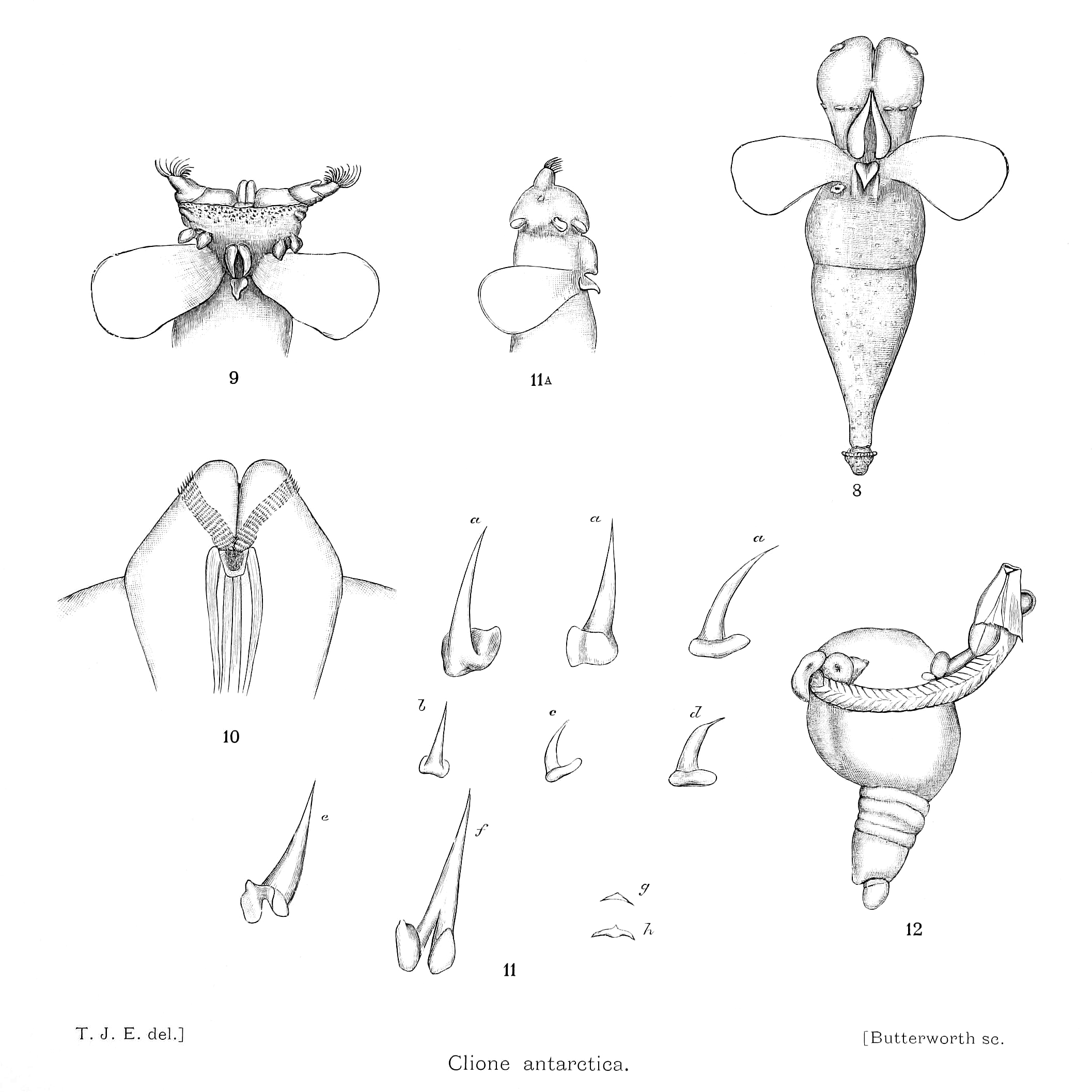
- Illustration of Clione Antarctica

Scientific classification
- Kingdom: Animalia
- Phylum: Mollusca
- Class: Gastropoda
- Clade: Euopisthobranchia
- Order: Pteropoda
- Family: Clionidae
- Genus: Clione
- Species: C. antarctica

Binomial name
- Clione antarctica (Smith, 1902)

= Clione antarctica =

Species of gastropod

Clione antarctica is a species of "sea angel", a sea slug, a pelagic marine gastropod mollusk in the family Clionidae, the "sea angels".

== Distribution ==
The distribution of Clione antarctica is within the Southern Hemisphere, in the polar waters of Antarctica.

== Description ==
The body length of this species is 1–3 cm (0.4–1.2 in).

== Ecology ==
Clione antarctica is an important component of polar ecosystems. It preys upon Limacina antarctica It is itself eaten by the medusa Diplulmaris antarctica. C. antarctica has a large lipid storage capacity: up to 5% of its wet mass. It is able to survive without food for about six months by utilizing these lipid storage reserves. Clione antarctica lays eggs in the spring.

This species defends itself from predators by synthesizing an ichthyodeterrent (a chemical that deters fishes); this is a previously unknown molecule called pteroenone. The sea angel acts as a "guest" for the hyperiid amphipod Hyperiella dilatata, which takes advantage of the protection provided by the gastropod's icthyodeterrent.
