= Paul Pelseneer =

Belgian zoologist (1863-1945)

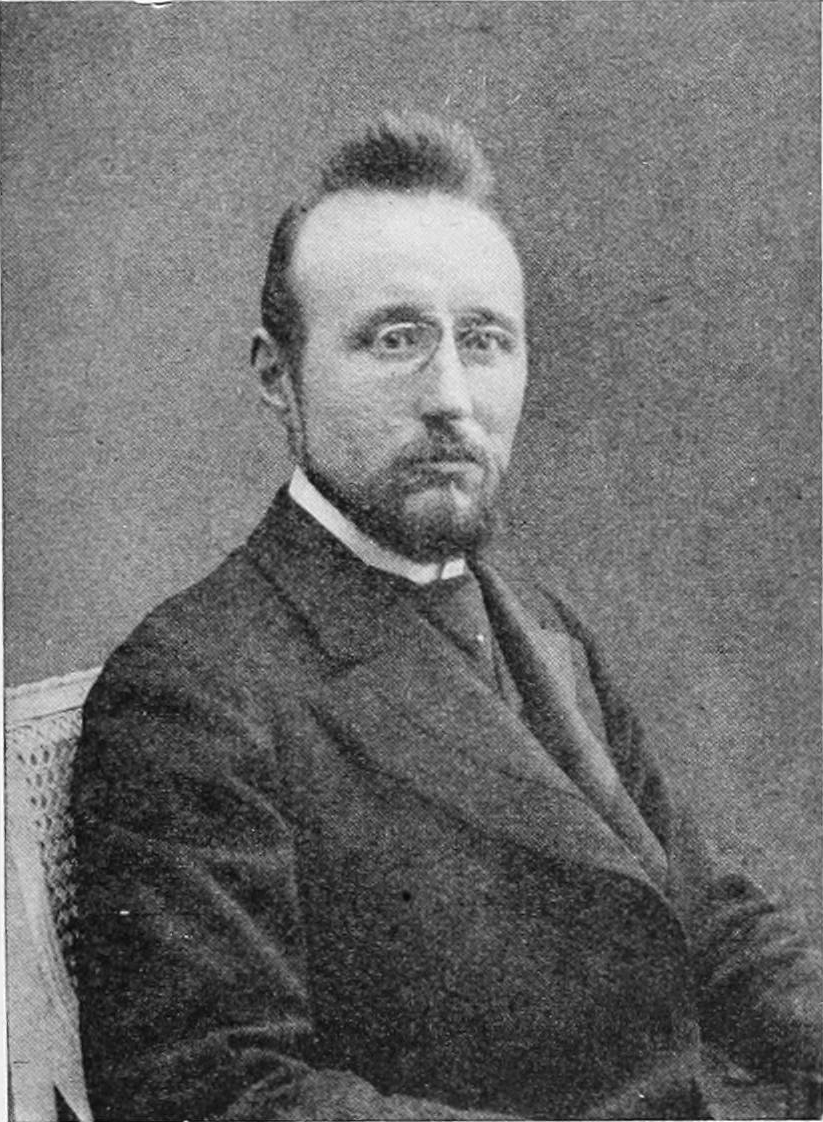
- Paul Pelseneer (1914 or earlier)
- Born: 26 June 1863; Brussels
- Died: 5 May 1945 (aged 81); Brussels
- Education: University of Brussels
- Scientific career
- Fields: malacology

Jean Paul Louis Pelseneer (Brussels, 26 June 1863 – Brussels, 5 May 1945) was a Belgian malacologist, morphologist, ethologist and phylogenist.

In 1880, at the age of seventeen, Pelseneer became a member of the Belgian Malacological Society. He studied at the University of Brussels and in 1884 he obtained his doctor's degree in natural sciences. He continued his studies with the French zoologist Alfred Mathieu Giard at the marine laboratory in Wimereux (Université Lille Nord de France), and concluded his studies with the English invertebrate zoologist Ray Lankester at University College London. Pelseneer then became a teacher of chemistry at the Normal School in Ghent. He devoted himself to zoology during his spare time, without having a laboratory at his disposal.

Pelseneer became recognized in Belgium as well as abroad as one of the most eminent zoologists of his time, but he never obtained an appointment as university professor and thus was not able to transfer his knowledge to students. The only times he could use a marine laboratory were in his spare time when he went to Lille and worked with Giard. His dissections were made using the most simple instruments, almost children's toys. He was given drawing lessons by the Belgian painter and sculptor Constantin Meunier, so that he could illustrate his scientific papers himself.

In 1889, Pelseneer became a corresponding member of the Royal Academy of Belgium, and became an ordinary member in 1903. He was removed from his teaching post in Ghent during the occupation by the Germans in World War I (1914–1918). In 1919 he became the perpetual secretary of the Royal Academy, and stayed in this post until 1936.

In 1906 he received the degree of Doctor honoris causa from the University of Leeds. Pelseneer was elected Honorary Member of the Malacological Society of London in 1922. In 1934 he received the degree of Doctor honoris causa from the University of Brussels for his outstanding works on molluscs.

Although Pelseneer was primarily a malacologist, he was interested in all aspects of zoology. During his lifetime he described 43 new marine species, 31 of which were molluscs.

He studied material from the Challenger expedition and from the Siboga Expedition led by Max Carl Wilhelm Weber. He contributed to replacing Wallace's line, which separates the biogeographic realms Australasia and Indomalaya, by a line located farther east, which he named Weber's Line.

He is the father of historian of science Jean Pelseneer (1903–1985).

== Bibliography ==
His publication list extends over more than sixty years. Bibliography by Paul Pelseneer include works:

- Pelseneer, P. (1880). Note on the shells found in 1880 along the Belgian coast [Note sur les coquilles trouvées en 1880 le long du littoral belge]. Bull. Soc. Malac. Belgique XV: XC-XCI
- Pelseneer, P. (1881). Studies on the littoral fauna of Belgium: molluscs collected at the Belgian coast in 1881 [Etudes sur la faune littorale de la Belgique: mollusques recueillis sur la côte belge en 1881]. Bull. Soc. Malac. Belgique XVI: CLII-CLVI
- Pelseneer, P. (1881). Etudes sur la faune littorale de la Belgique: Tuniciers, crustacés, vers, échinodermes et coelentérés recueillis en 1881 sur la côte belge. Bull. Soc. Malac. Belgique XVI: CLXVIII-CLXXIII
- Pelseneer, P. (1881). Dichotomous overview of the marine molluscs of Belgium [Tableau dichotomique des mollusques marins de la Belgique]. Mém. Soc. Roy. Malacol. Belgique XVI: 27–61, plate V
- Pelseneer, P. (1881). Studies on the coastal fauna of Belgium (cestoid worms and crustaceans) [Etudes sur la faune littorale de la Belgique (vers chétopodes et Crustacés)]. Ann. Soc. Roy. Malac. Belgique 16: 88–98
- Pelseneer, P. (1882). Studies on the littoral fauna of Belgium: molluscs and other lower animals collected at the Belgian coast in 1882 [Etudes sur la faune littorale de la Belgique: mollusques et autres animaux inférieurs recueillis sur la côte belge en 1882]. Mém. Soc. Roy. Malacol. Belgique XVII: 31–43
- Pelseneer, P. (1883). Studies on the littoral fauna of Belgium: molluscs and other lower animals collected at the Belgian coast in 1883 [Etudes sur la faune littorale de la Belgique: mollusques et autres animaux inférieurs recueillis sur la côte belge en 1883]. Bull. Soc. Malac. Belgique XVIII: CXVI-CXXI
- Pelseneer, P. (1886). Liste des crustacés actuels de la Belgique. Bull. Mus. royal d'Hist. Nat. Belg. 4: 215–222
- Pelseneer, P. (1889). Communication on a variety unicarinata of Littorina littorea [Communication sur une variété unicarinata de Littorina littorea]. Bull. Soc. Malac. Belgique XXIV: CIX-CX
- Pelseneer, P. (1893–1894). Recherches sur divers ophistobranches. Mém. cour. et Mém. des Sav. 53: III-157, 25 pl. et 6 fig.
- Pelseneer, P. (1894). P.-J. Van Beneden malacologist: biographical note [P.-J. Van Beneden malacologiste: notice biographique]. Ann. Soc. Roy. Malac. Belgique XXIX: V-IX
- Pelseneer, P. (1893). La formation de variétés chez la moule comestible. Ann. Soc. Roy. Zool. Bel. 28: 48
- Pelseneer, P. (1898–1899). Recherches morphologiques et phylogénétiques sur les mollusques archaïques. Mém. cour. et Mém. des Sav. 57: 113, 24 pl.
- Pelseneer, P. (1903). Zoologie: Mollusques (Amphineures, Gastropodes et Lamellibranches). Résultats du Voyage du S.Y. Belgica en 1897-1898-1899 sous le commandement de A. de Gerlache de Gomery: Rapports Scientifiques (1901–1913). Buschmann: Anvers, Belgium. 85, IX plates pp.
- Pelseneer, P. (1904). Oceanography [L'océanographie]. Imprimerie universitaire J.-H. Moreau: Bruxelles. 1–16 pp.
- Pelseneer, P. (1906). The origin of fresh water animals [L'origine des animaux d'eau douce]. Academia Analecta 12: 699–741
- Pelseneer, P. (1906). Mollusca. A treatise on zoology, V. Adam and Charles Black: London, UK. 355 pp.
- Pelseneer, P. (1906). Biscayan plankton collected during a cruise of H.M.S. Research, 1900. Part VII: Mollusca (excluding Cephalopoda). Trans. Linn. Soc. Lond. Ser. 2: Zool. 10(5): 137–157, 3 plates
- Pelseneer, P. (1911). The Lamellibranchia of the Siboga expedition: anatomical part [Les Lamellibranches de l'expédition du Siboga: partie anatomique]. Siboga-Expeditie: uitkomsten op zoölogisch, botanisch, oceanographisch en geologisch gebied verzameld in Nederlandsch Oost-Indië 1899-1900 aan boord H.M. Siboga onder commando van Lieutenant ter Zee 1e kl. G.F. Tydeman, 53a. Boekhandel en drukkerij: Leiden. 1–125, 26 pl. pp.
- Pelseneer, P. (1911). Recherches sur l'embryologie des Gastropodes. Mém. De l'Acad. Roy. De Belg. (Classe des Sciences). In 4°. (2ième série) 3: 1–167, 22 pl., 1 fig.
- Pelseneer, P. (1914). L'influence des courants dans la dispersion des organismes marins. Ann. Soc. Roy. Zool. Bel. 48: 11
- Pelseneer, P. (1914). Influence of the currents on the dispersion of marine organisms [Influence des courants dans la dispersion des organismes marins]. Ann. Soc. Roy. Zool. Bel. 48: 14–17
- Pelseneer, P. (1920). A propos de la formation et de la composition chimique de la coquille des mollusques. Ann. Soc. Roy. Zool. Malacol. Bel. 51: 70–74
- Pelseneer, P. (1920). Les variations et leur hérédité chez les mollusques. Mém. De l'Acad. Roy. De Belg. (Classe des Sciences). In 4°. (2ième série) 5: 826, 287 fig.
- Pelseneer, P. (1922). On a habit of Doris bilamellata [Sur une habitude de Doris bilamellata]. Ann. Soc. Roy. Zool. Bel. 53: 28–32
- Pelseneer, P. (1926). The relative sex proportion among the animals and especially among the Mollusca [La proportion rélative des sexes chez les animaux et particulièrement chez les mollusques]. Mém. De l'Acad. Roy. De Belg. (Classe des Sciences). In 8°. (2ième série) 8: 3–256, 6 fig.
- Pelseneer, P. (1928). La variabilité relative des sexes d'après des variations chez Patella, Trochus et Nassa. Mém. De l'Acad. Roy. De Belg. (Classe des Sciences). In 8°. (2ième série) 10: 52–54, 13 pl. 3 fig.
- Pelseneer, P. (1934). Bionomics of a brackish-water nudibranch: Limapontia depressa. J. Conch., Lond. 20(2): 54–55
- Pelseneer, P. (1935). Essay on zoological ethology based on the study on Mollusca [Essai d'éthologie zoologique d'après l'étude des mollusques]. Académie royale de Belgique. Classe des Sciences: Brussel, Belgium. 662 pp.
- Pelseneer, P. (1935–1937). Philippe Dautzenberg (1849–1935). Ann. Soc. Roy. Zool. Belg. 66(67–68): 87–91
- Pelseneer, P. (1938). The respiratory surface of amphibian mollusks [La surface respiratoire des mollusques amphibies]. Travaux de la Station Zoologique de Wimereux 13: 531–537
- Pelseneer, P. (1941). The Lamarckian conception on the evolution [La conception lamarckienne de l'évolution]. Bull. Soc. r. Sci. Liège 1: 1–14
- Caullery, M.; Pelseneer, P. (1911). Sur la ponte et le développement du vignot (Littorina littorea). Bull. Scient. France et Belgique 44: 357–360
