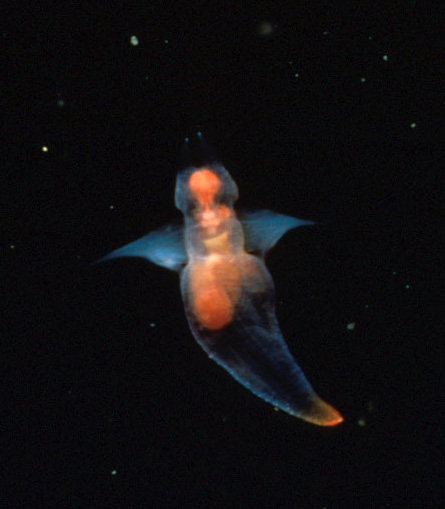
- Clione limacina

Scientific classification
- Kingdom: Animalia
- Phylum: Mollusca
- Class: Gastropoda
- Clade: Euopisthobranchia
- Order: Pteropoda
- Superfamily: Clionoidea
- Family: Clionidae; Rafinesque, 1815

= Clionidae =

Family of gastropods

The Clionidae are a family of sea angels, which are a group of pelagic marine gastropods.

They resemble angels, complete with flapping "wings", hence their common name. They are gelatinous, mostly transparent pteropods, and they only have shells in their embryonic stage. They are mostly very small, with the largest species (Clione limacina) reaching 5 cm (2 in).

== External anatomy ==
The Clionidae use winglike flaps for rhythmical locomotion, as if flying in the sea. These "wings" are attached to the anterior part of the body. The posterior part is gelatinous and mostly transparent.

The orange visceral sac is confined to the anterior part.

== Life habits ==
Mating is carried out ventrally for mutual fertilization. The following spring, this results in a free-floating, gelatinous egg mass.

== Taxonomy ==
Clionidae d'Orbigny, 1851 is unfortunately also the name of a family of sponges in the order Hadromerida, class Demospongiae. Within the ICZN there has been a proposed emendation of spelling to Clionaidae for the sponge family. The ICZN has ruled the correct name of gastropod family is Clionidae Gray, 1847, with type genus Clione Pallas, 1774.

These two subfamilies have been recognized in the taxonomy of Bouchet & Rocroi (2005):

- subfamily Clioninae Rafinesque, 1815 – synonyms: Fowlerininae Pruvot-Fol, 1926
- subfamily Thliptodontinae, Kwietniewski, 1902 – synonyms: Pteroceanidae Meisenheimer, 1902; Cephalobranchiinae Pruvot-Fol, 1926

== Genera ==
Genera within the family Clionidae include:

subfamily Clioninae

- Clione Pallas, 1774 – type genus
- Fowlerina Pelseneer, 1906

subfamily Thliptodontinae

- Cephalobrachia Bonnevie, 1912
- Thliptodon Boas, 1886

subfamily ?

- Paedoclione Danforth, 1907 – with the only species Paedoclione doliiformis Danforth, 1907
- Paraclione Tesch, 1903
- Thalassopterus Kwietniewski, 1910 – with the only species Thalassopterus zancleus Kwietniewski, 1910
