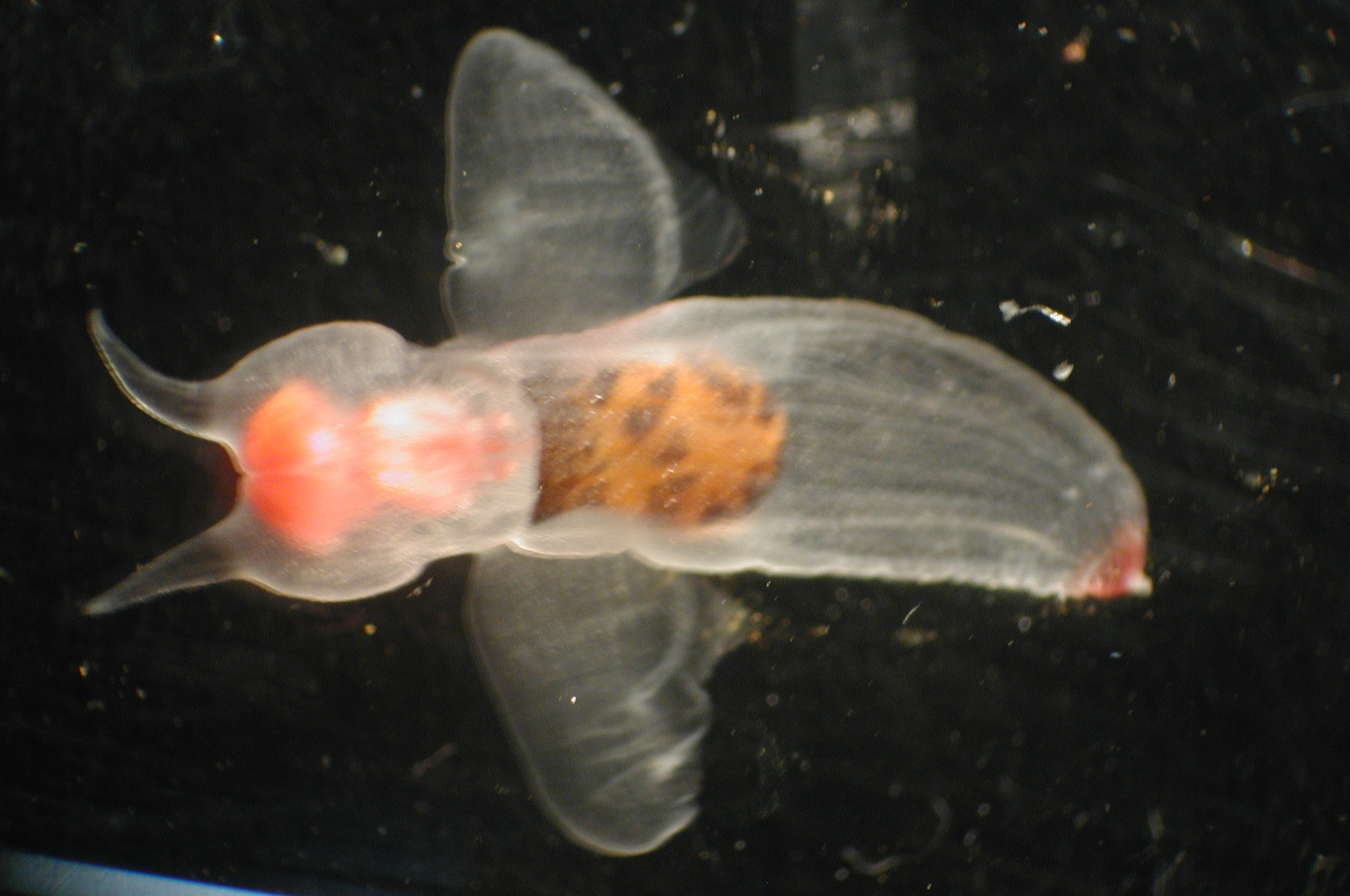
- Clione limacina

Scientific classification
- Kingdom: Animalia
- Phylum: Mollusca
- Class: Gastropoda
- Clade: Euopisthobranchia
- Order: Pteropoda
- Suborder: Gymnosomata

Families
- Clionidae; Cliopsidae; Hydromylidae; Laginiopsidae; Notobranchaeidae; Pneumodermatidae; Thliptodontidae

= Sea angel =

Gymnosomata

Clade of gastropods

Sea angels (clade Gymnosomata) are a large group of small free-swimming sea slugs, classified into six separate families. They are pelagic opisthobranchs in the clade Gymnosomata within the larger mollusc clade Heterobranchia. Sea angels were previously considered to be pteropods.

Sea angels are also sometimes known as "sea butterflies" but this is potentially misleading because the family Clionidae is just one of the families within this clade, and the term "sea butterfly" is also applied to the shelled Thecosomata.

Recent molecular data suggest the Gymnosomata form a sister group to the Thecosomata (other planktonic, weakly or nonmineralized gastropods), but this long-standing hypothesis has also had some recent detractors.

== Distribution ==
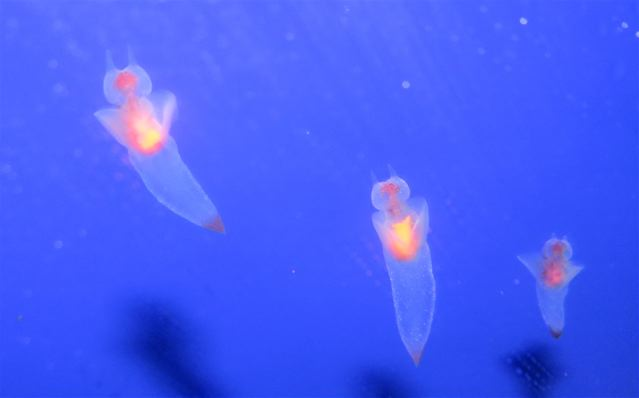
Sea angels in Australian waters

These organisms have a wide geographic range, from polar regions, under sea ice, to equatorial (tropic) seas. From spring to autumn, sea angels live at a depth of 200 m in the Sea of Okhotsk. In winter, they migrate to the coast of north Hokkaido with drift ice.

== Description ==
In this clade, the foot of the gastropod has developed into wing-like flapping appendages (parapodia) and larval sea angels discard their embryonic shells a few days after hatching. Both adaptations suit their free-swimming oceanic lives. The adaptations also explain the common name sea angel and their order's name, from Ancient Greek γυμνός (gumnós), meaning "naked", and σῶμα (sôma), meaning "body".

The lack of a heavy shell for gymnosomes allows them to hover on the upper water surfaces for longer periods, along with a streamlined body that reduces the drag coefficient. Also, gymnosomes have a low aspect ratio which aids them to maneuver and accelerate quickly.

Sea angels are gelatinous, mostly transparent, and very small, with the largest species (Clione limacina) reaching 5 cm. C. limacina is a polar species; those found in warmer waters are far smaller. Some species of sea angels feed exclusively on sea butterflies; the angels have terminal mouths with the radula common to mollusks, and tentacles to grasp their prey, sometimes with suckers similar to cephalopods.

=== Wings anatomy ===
The wing comprises seven groups of muscles, anterior oblique muscles for dorsal and ventral sides, posterior oblique muscles for dorsal and ventral sides, the longitudinal and transverse wing retractors muscles, and dorso-ventral muscles. The first four groups form a continuous sheet where the dorsal muscles are perpendicular to the ventral muscles. Transverse and longitudinal retractors muscles retract the wing along the span and the chord. The dorso-ventral muscles control the thickness of the wing by changing the haemocoelic pressure inside the wing, this also ejects the buccal apparatus from C. limacina’s head.

== Behavior ==
Gymnosomata are carnivorous, feeding only on their fellow pteropods, the Thecosomata. Their lifestyles have coevolved with those of their prey, with their feeding strategy adapting to the morphology and consistency of the thecosome shell.

By rowing their "wings" back and forth at 1–3 Hz, the sea angels swim at speeds up to 100 mm/s (0.22 mph). This is about twice as fast as their prey, the sea butterfly. Tracing the wingtip showed a ‘figure-of-eight’ trajectory and stroke plane orthogonal to the caudal-rostral axis, this pattern was observed in some aerial insects, small birds such as hummingbirds, and sea butterflies such as Limacina helicina. It is not yet clear whether the sea angel uses its swimming appendages as 'rowing paddles' or as 'wings'.

However, cold water sea angel C. antarctica likely accommodates drag-based force production for several reasons: (1) Low aspect ratio for C.antarctica causes deleterious lift-drag ratios. (2) High angle of attack typically ranges from 60 to 80 degrees. (3) The orthogonality between the surface of the wing and ascending trajectory of the sea angel.

Furthermore, Clione antarctica, defends itself from predators by synthesizing a previously unknown noxious molecule, pteroenone. Because of this secretion, predators will not eat the sea angel. A species of amphipod takes advantage of this trait: The amphipod will seize an individual of C. antarctica out of the water column, and carry it around for protection. Local population density of C. antarctica may reach extraordinary levels; up to 300 animals per cubic metre have been recorded.

Their hunting strategies are variable; some forms are ambush predators, sitting and waiting for their prey; whilst others actively pursue their prey; their metabolic rate is closely linked to that of their prey species. Even the size of the gymnosomes is correlated to the size of their prey, which they recognize by means of touch and grab using their sometimes-suckered buccal cones. A combination of hooks and a toothed radula are employed to scour the flesh from the thecosomes' shells.

C. limacina stimulates the neuromuscular system to chase the prey, this notably increases the motion of the wings, minimizes the gap between wingtips at the end of each stroke, lessening the aspect ratio, and increases the deflection of the wings. Therefore, reducing the drag forces and overcoming stall. Also, the increment in the angle of attack along with low Reynold number for sea angels resembles the fluid dynamic forces acting on insects such as Drosophila.

Gymnosomes slowly beat their wing-like parapodia in a rowing motion to propel their "perfectly streamlined" bodies through the upper 20 m of the water column. Although usually slow-moving, beating their wings once or twice per second, they are capable of bursts of speed when they need to pursue their prey, calling a separate suite of muscles into action to obtain the higher beat frequency.

== Reproduction and development ==
Like many gastropods, sea angels are simultaneous hermaphrodites with internal fertilization. A fertilized animal later releases a gelatinous egg mass, and the eggs float freely until hatching. Their embryonic shells are lost within the first few days after hatching. Within the first 4 weeks-1 month of a sea angel's life, its feces begin to glow in the dark.

The gymnosomes, like other shell-less opisthobranchs, (Note: Opisthobranchs with no shells are the gymnosomes (sea angels), the sacoglossa, and nudibranchs.) discard their shells at metamorphosis, with the retractor muscles being severed and the shell lost. The group does not truly, therefore, lack a shell. Few larval shells have been described (and consequently an understanding of their fossil record is as yet unknown).

== Taxonomy ==
Cladogram of sea angels according
to Peijnenburg, Janssen, et al. (2022).

- Pteropoda
  - Gymnosomata (sea angels)
    - - Clione antarctica
    - - - Pneumodermopsis spe
      - - Spongiobranchaea australis
        - Pneumoderma violaceum
  - Thecosomata (sea butterflies)
    (19 species in 13 genera)

Note that the use of Pteropoda as the containing clade is traditional, but contested. Others would omit Pteropoda and use its containing clade Euopisthobranchia or subclass Heterobranchia.

The other suborder of pteropods, Thecosomata, is superficially similar to sea angels, but are not closely related; some authorities include both Thecosomata and Gymnosomata as separate branches of the order Pteropoda, whereas others list them as distinct orders within the subclass Heterobranchia. They have larger, broader parapodia, and most of that species retain a shell; they are commonly known as sea butterflies.

In the new taxonomy of Bouchet & Rocroi (2005), the clade Gymnosomata is arranged as follows:

- Superfamily Clionoidea:
  - family Clionidae
  - family Cliopsidae
  - family Notobranchaeidae
  - family Pneumodermatidae
- Superfamily Hydromyloidea:
  - family Hydromylidae
  - family Laginiopsidae

The group that used to be the family Thliptodontidae is treated as Thliptodontinae, a subfamily of the family Clionidae.
