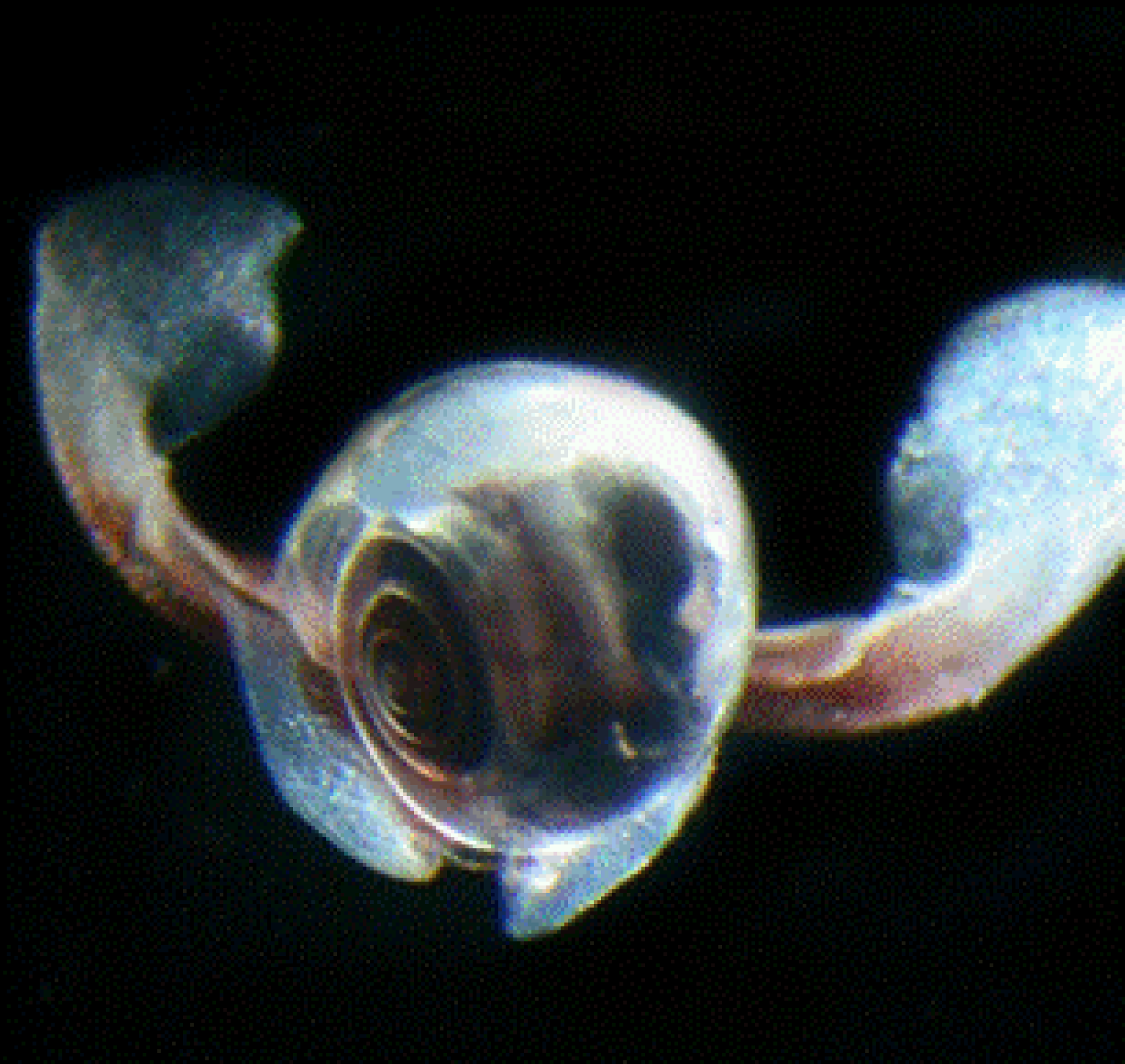

Scientific classification
- Kingdom: Animalia
- Phylum: Mollusca
- Class: Gastropoda
- Clade: Euopisthobranchia
- Order: Pteropoda
- Family: Limacinidae
- Genus: Limacina
- Species: L. rangii

Binomial name
- Limacina rangii Woodward, 1854

Synonyms
- Atlanta rangii d'Orbigny, 1834 (original combination); Limacina antarctica Woodward, 1854; Limacina antarctica f. rangii (d'Orbigny, 1834); Limacina cucullata Gould, 1852; Limacina helicina antarctica Woodward, 1854; Limacina helicina f. 'antarctica' Woodward, 1854; Limacina rangii f. antarctica Woodward, 1854; Limacina rangii f. rangii (d'Orbigny, 1834)

= Limacina rangii =

Species of gastropod

Limacina rangii is a species of swimming sea snail in the family Limacinidae, which belong to the group commonly known as sea butterflies (Thecosomata).

Limacina rangii is a keystone species of the mesozooplankton of Antarctic pelagic ecosystems.

Until 2010 this taxon was known only as Limacina helicina antarctica or as Limacina helicina f. antarctica. Limacina rangii is however now considered to be a separate species from Limacina helicina, based on cytochrome c oxidase subunit I (COI) gene sequences.

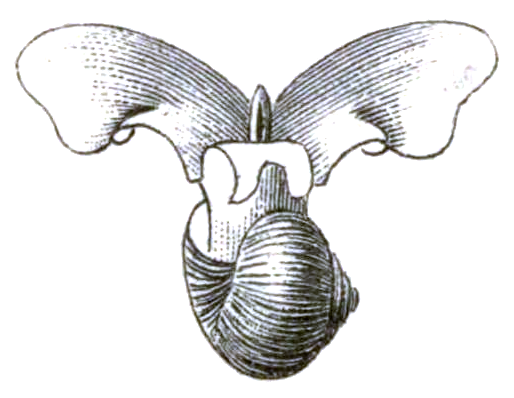
Drawing of Limacina rangii

== Distribution ==
The distribution of Limacina rangii is circumglobal south of 50°S.

This species occurs in the Weddell Sea and Ross Sea in the Antarctic and in Cumberland Bay, South Georgia. and other localities in the Southern Ocean.

== Description ==
Limacina rangii has a sinistral and very thin shell. The shell thickness is approximately 2–9 μm. There are ribs on the surface of the shell. There are differences in the shell structure between Limacina rangii and Limacina helicina.

The width of the shell is 0.5–6 mm.

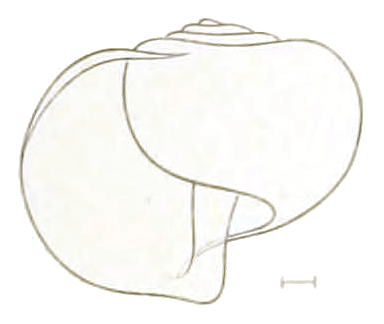
Apertural view.

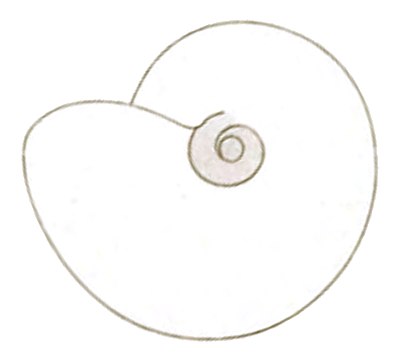
Umbilical view.

== Ecology ==
Limacina rangii is a holoplanktonic species. It is very abundant in the Southern Ocean, with up to 2681 individuals per m^{3}. This species is abundant in the Ross Sea, Antarctica. It is sometimes even more abundant than krill.

Limacina rangii feeds mainly on phytoplankton and also on zooplankton, but less so. It catches its prey using mucus webs.

This snail is a primary consumer and directly depends on phytoplankton. When the phytoplankton is reduced, the population of Limacina rangii is also reduced, and it can even disappear as happened in McMurdo Sound in the summer of 2000–2001. It is considered an indicator species of the health of the ecosystem. Under different conditions in McMurdo Sound there can be over 300 individuals per m^{3}, which is over 20% of the biomass of zooplankton.

Fecal pellets of Limacina rangii and its quantity have been firstly described by Manno et al. (2010). Fecal pellets are oval, greenish brown and with peritrophic membrane. A size of a single pellet varies from 103 μm (286600 μm^{3}) to 120 μm (440,610 μm^{3}). A single Limacina rangii produces about 6-11 pellets daily. Population of Limacina rangii in the studied area in the Ross Sea produced from about 71,000 pellets per square meter per year to about 362,000 pellets per square meter per year. Fecal pellets of Limacina rangii has contributed to about 19% of flux of organic carbon. Fecal pellets of Limacina rangii together with dead Limacina rangii can cover up to 72% (estimation) of organic carbon flux to the deep water.

Limacina rangii probably affect carbon cycle, resources of phytoplankton and dimethyl sulfide (emission by phytoplankton), that may have impact on the Earth's climate.

Many predators depend on Limacina rangii as their food source:

- The gastropod Clione antarctica feeds only on Limacina rangii. There is a coevolutionary relationship between this specialized predator and its prey; their life cycles are parallel.
- The medusae Solmundella bitentaculata and Diplulmaris antarctica

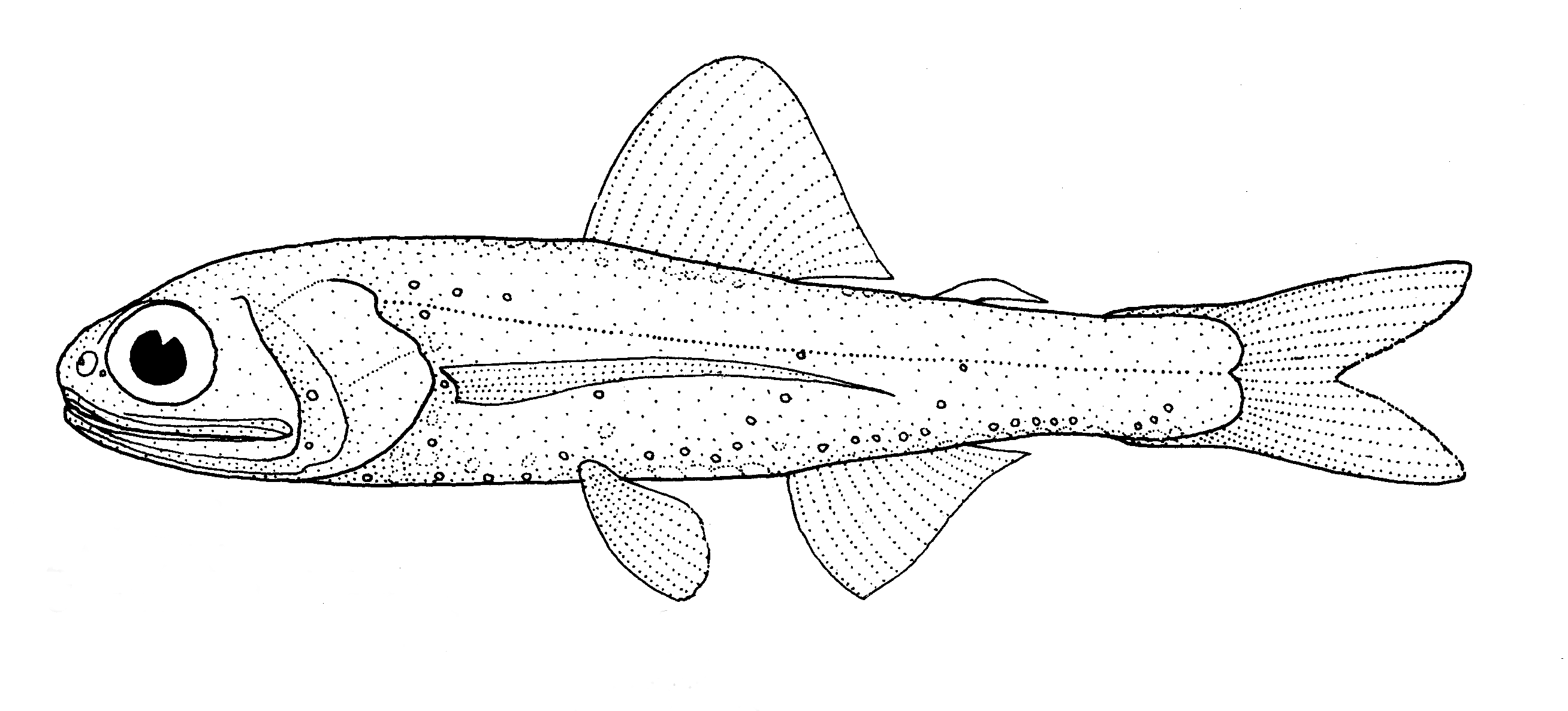
The myctophid fish Ceratoscopelus warmingii is one of numerous fish species that prey on Limacina rangii

- Fish in the family Myctophidae heavily depend on Limacina rangii. Limacina are food for a number of myctophid fishes in the Southern Ocean: Electrona antarctica, Electrona paucirastra, Electrona subaspera, Metelectrona herwigi, Protomyctophum normani, Diaphus taaningi, Diaphus hudsoni, Gymnoscopelus nicholsi, Ceratoscopelus warmingii and Symbolophorus boops.
- Also notothenioid fish (family Nototheniidae) heavily depend on Limacina rangii as food. For example, fishes: Trematomus newnesi, Trematomus bernacchii, Trematomus hansoni, Trematomus centronotus and Pagothenia borchgrevink.
- Whales heavily depend on this species
