= Rockcod =

Rockcod is a term applied to several unrelated fishes, which all look roughly cod-like and live among rocky habitat. Most are of some importance in fisheries.

In the codling family (Moridae):

- Lotella rhacina, the Rock Cod proper

In the cod icefish family (Nototheniidae)

- Eleginops
- Notothenia
- Paranotothenia
- Trematomus

In the grouper family (Serranidae):

- Epinephelus
- Cephalopholis

"Rockcods" is also an alternate name for the thornyhead family (Sebastidae).

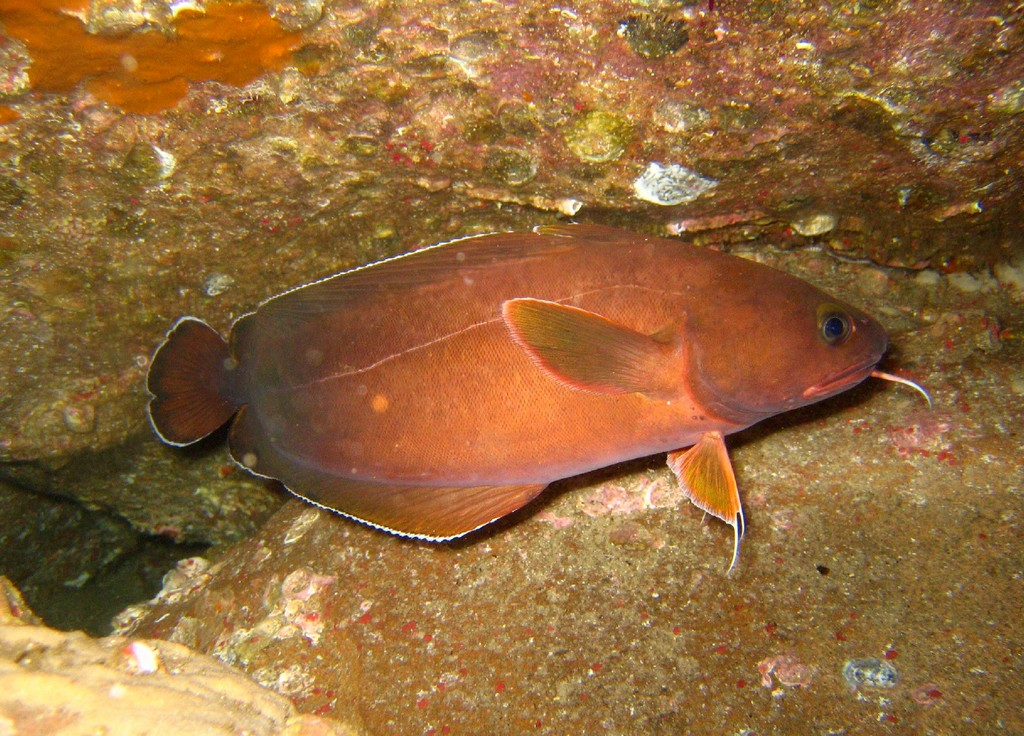
Rock Cod
Lotella rhacina
Moridae

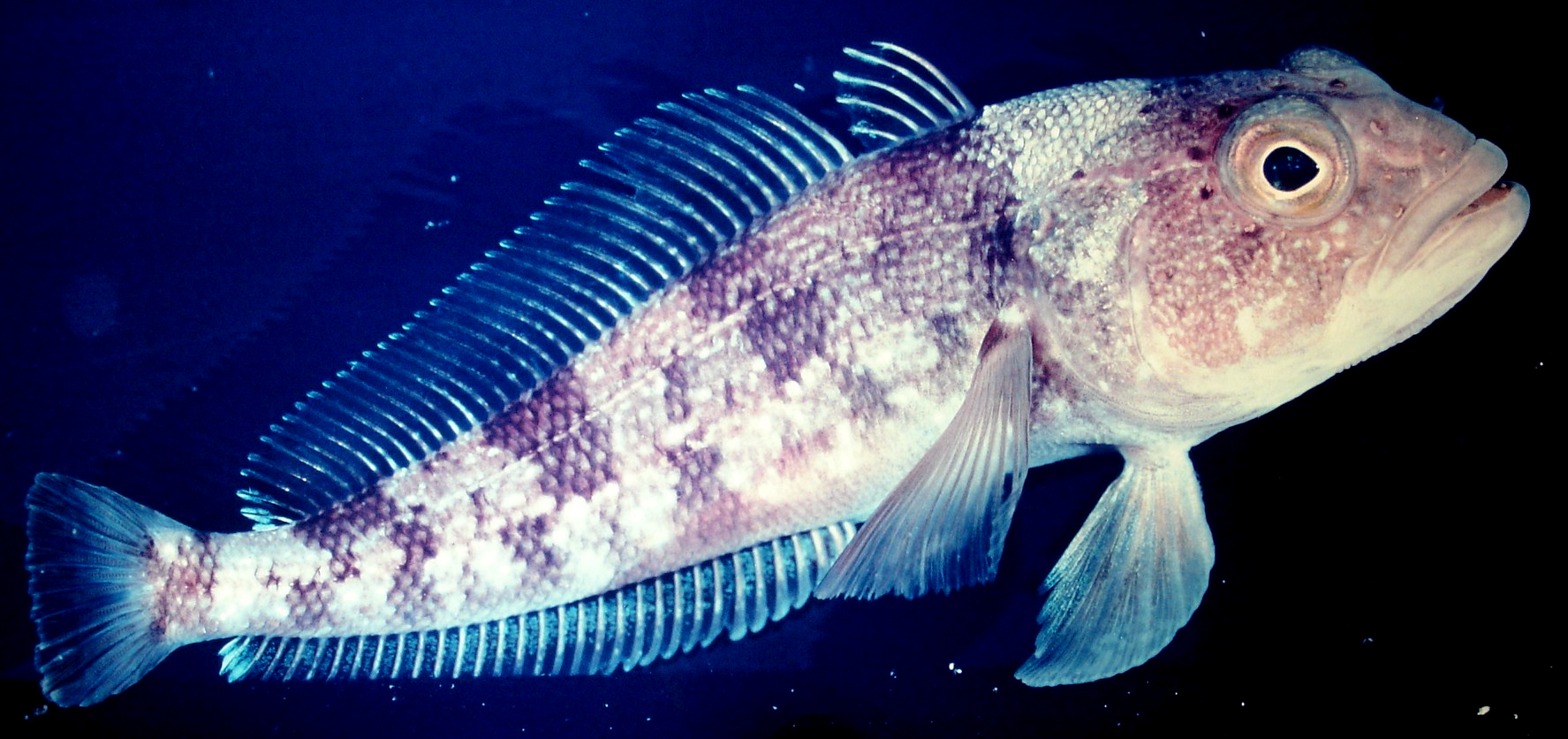
Emerald Rockcod
Trematomus bernacchii
Nototheniidae

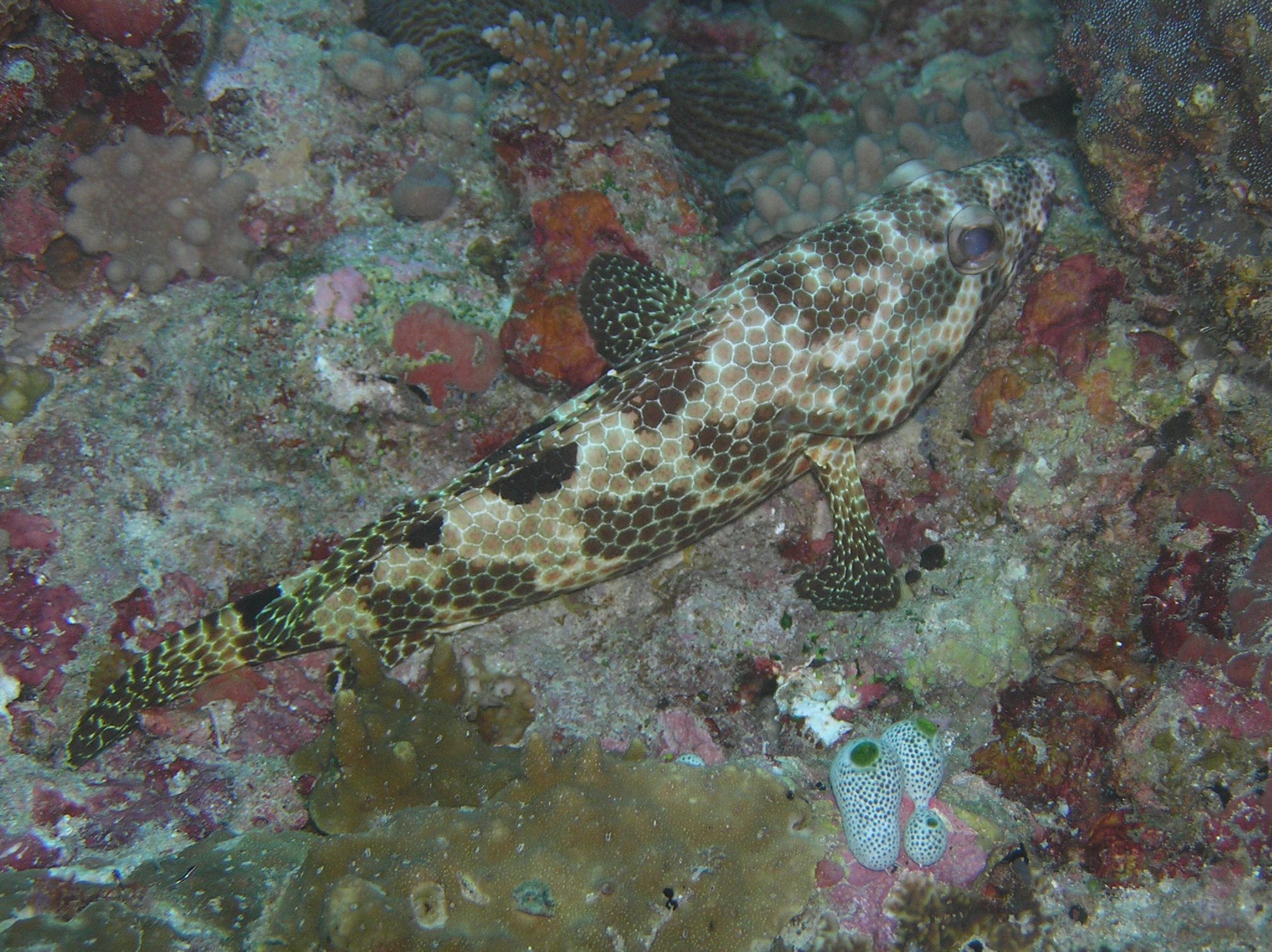
Honeycomb Rockcod
Epinephelus merra
Serranidae

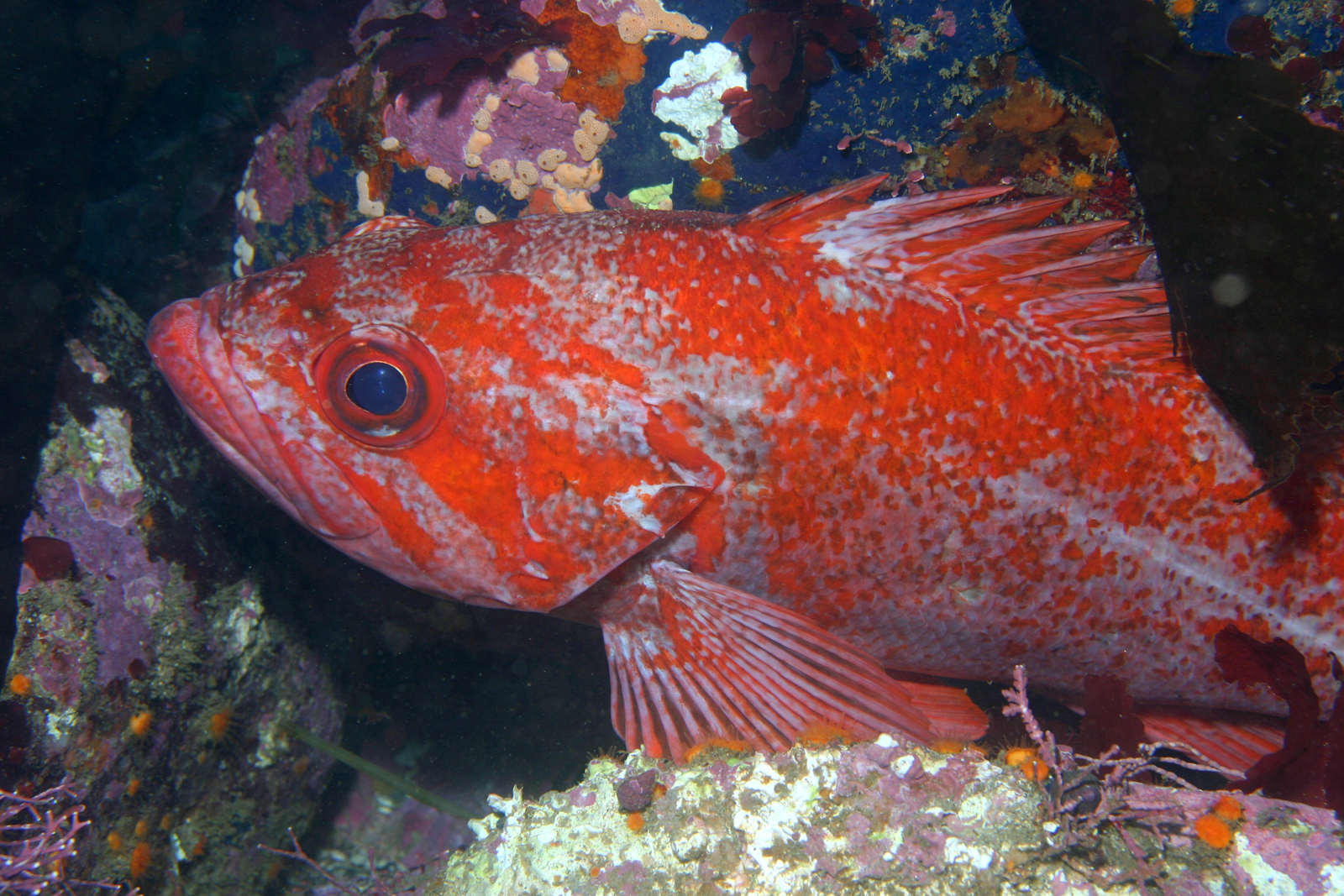
Vermilion Rockcod
Sebastes miniatus
Sebastidae
