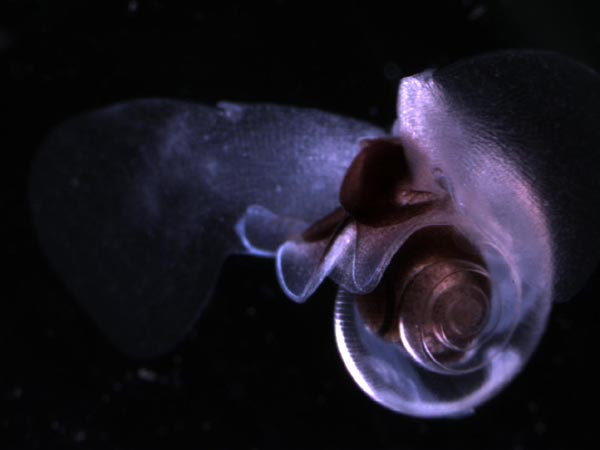
- Limacina helicina

Scientific classification
- Kingdom: Animalia
- Phylum: Mollusca
- Class: Gastropoda
- Clade: Euopisthobranchia
- Order: Pteropoda
- Family: Limacinidae
- Genus: Limacina; Bosc, 1817

Type species
- Clio helicina Phipps, 1774

Species
- See text

Synonyms
- list of synonyms: Agadina A. A. Gould, 1852 junior subjective synonym; † Chadumella Korobkov, 1966; Crino Gistel, 1848 junior subjective synonym (Unnecessary substitute name for Limacina); Heterofusus Fleming, 1823; Limacina (Limacina) Bosc, 1817 · accepted, alternate representation; Lornia Marwick, 1926; Munthea van der Spoel, 1967 (unavailable name: no type species designated); Scaea Philippi, 1844; Spiratella Blainville, 1817 (Objective synonym of Limacina); Spiratella (Heterofusus) J. Fleming, 1823 ·; Spiratella (Pygmella) Tembrock, 1989; Spirialis Eydoux & Souleyet, 1840; † Valvatina Bornemann, 1855 (junior subjective synonym)

= Limacina =

Genus of gastropods

Limacina is a genus of swimming predatory sea snails commonly known as sea butterflies in the family Limacinidae. This genus contains some of the world's most abundant gastropod species.

Etymological meaning of the generic name Limacina is "snail-like".

As pelagic marine gastropods, Limacina swim by flapping their parapodia, inspiring the common name sea butterflies.

Sea butterflies are part of the clade Thecosomata. Sea angels, similar to Limacina, are in the order Gymnosomata. Both of these orders are still referred to as "pteropods". Sea butterflies of the order Thecosomata have a shell, while sea angels in the order Gymnosomata do not.

== Shell description ==
The shells of Limacina are well developed, sinistrally coiled, turret-like, and include an operculum. Shell size and thickness vary within the genus. At high latitudes, the diameter of the shell does not exceed 15 mm. At lower latitudes, the diameter varies from 1 to 3 mm.

== Description of the soft parts ==
Two large winglike parapodia, derived from foot tissue, propel these invertebrates through the water column to overcome negative buoyancy due to the animal's shell. As diel vertical migrators, Limacina inhabit deeper waters during the day and travel to the surface at night to feed.

== Life habits ==
Feeding habits of Limacina are characterized by actively feeding on planktonic organisms such as bacteria, small crustaceans, gastropod larvae, dinoflagellates and diatoms. These prey items become entangled in a mucosal web (up to 5 cm wide) excreted by the animal that is, in turn, eaten along with the prey items. This net also provides positive buoyancy. Ciliated posterior footlobes and lateral footlobes move food collected by the mucosal web into the mouth.

Large aggregations of Limacina migrating to the surface of the water attract predators such as Clione (family Clionidae, suborder Gymnosomata), baleen whales, various species of salmonids, herring, and seabirds.

== Species ==
Species within the genus Limacina include:

- † Limacina acutimarginata Korobkov, 1966
- † Limacina adornata Hodgkinson, 1992
- † Limacina advenulata (Darragh, 1997)
- † Limacina aegis Hodgkinson, 1992
- † Limacina andrussowi (Kittl, 1886)
- Limacina antarctica S. P. Woodward, 1854
- † Limacina aryanaensis A. W. Janssen, 2013
- † Limacina asiatica A. W. Janssen, 2011
- † Limacina atlanta (Mörch, 1874)
- Limacina bulimoides (d'Orbigny, 1836) - Bulimoid pteropod. Distribution: Red Sea, Pacific. Length: 1.2 mm.
- † Limacina canadaensis Hodgkinson, 1992
- † Limacina conica (Koenen, 1892)
- † Limacina convolutus Hodgkinson, 1992
- † Limacina davidi Hodgkinson, 1992
- † Limacina dilatata (Koenen, 1892)
- † Limacina dzheroiensis A. W. Janssen, 2011
- † Limacina erasmiana Janssen, 2010
- † Limacina ernstkittli A. W. Janssen, 2012 †
- † Limacina gormani (Curry, 1982)
- † Limacina gramensis (Rasmussen, 1968)
- † Limacina guersi Janssen, 2010
- † Limacina hainanensis H.-J. Wang, 1982
- † Limacina heatherae Hodgkinson, 1992
- Limacina helicina (Phipps, 1774) - Helicid pteropod. Type species.
- † Limacina helikos Hodgkinson, 1992
- † Limacina ingridae A. W. Janssen, 1989
- † Limacina irisae A. W. Janssen, 1989
- † Limacina karasawai Ando, 2011
- † Limacina konkensis (Zhizhchenko, 1937)
- Limacina lesueurii (d'Orbigny, 1836) - Distribution: North America, Western Atlantic.
- † Limacina limata (Marwick, 1926)
- † Limacina lotschi (Tembrock, 1989)
- † Limacina mariae A. W. Janssen, 1989
- † Limacina nemoris (Curry, 1965)
- † Limacina novacaesarea A. W. Janssen & Sessa, 2016
- † Limacina parvabrazensis Garvie & A. W. Janssen, 2020
- † Limacina perforata A. W. Janssen, 2013
- † Limacina planorbella (Korobkov, 1966)
- † Limacina pseudopygmaea Garvie & A. W. Janssen, 2020
- † Limacina pygmaea (Lamarck, 1805)
- Limacina rangii (d'Orbigny, 1834)
- Limacina retroversa (Fleming, 1823) - Retrovert pteropod. Distribution: North America, Western Atlantic, Arctic Ocean.
- † Limacina robusta (Eames, 1952)
- † Limacina sculptilis (Maxwell, 1992)
- † Limacina smithvillensis Hodgkinson, 1992
- † Limacina subtarchanensis (Zhizhchenko, 1936)
- † Limacina tanzaniaensis L. J. Cotton, A. W. Janssen, Pearson & van Driel, 2017
- † Limacina tarchanensis (Kittl, 1886)
- † Limacina tertiaria (Tate, 1887)
- † Limacina texanopsis Garvie, 2020
- † Limacina timi L. J. Cotton, A. W. Janssen, Pearson & van Driel, 2017
- Limacina trochiformis (d'Orbigny, 1836) - Trochiform pteropod. Distribution: North America, Western Atlantic, Red Sea, Pacific. Length: 1 mm.
- † Limacina tutelina (Curry, 1965)
- † Limacina umbilicata (Bornemann, 1855)
- † Limacina valvatina (Reuss, 1867)
- † Limacina? vegrandis Cahuzac & Janssen, 2010
- † Limacina wechesensis Hodgkinson, 1992
- † Limacina wilhelminae A. W. Janssen, 1989
- † Limacina yadongensis X.-F. Li, G.-B. Li, Garvie, T.-Y. Wang & J. Zhao, 2020
- † Limacina yazdii A. W. Janssen, 2013

== Synonyms ==
- Limacina antarctica Woodward, 1854: synonym of Limacina rangii f. antarctica Woodward, 1854: synonym of Limacina rangii (d'Orbigny, 1834)
- † Limacina atypica (Laws, 1944): synonym of † Heliconoides atypicus (Laws, 1944) (superseded combination)
- Limacina balea Møller, 1841: synonym of Limacina retroversa (Fleming, 1823)
- Limacina contorta Sykes, 1905: synonym of Limacina trochiformis (d'Orbigny, 1834)
- Limacina crossei Pelseneer, 1888: synonym of Limacina lesueurii (d'Orbigny, 1835)
- Limacina cucullata Gould, 1852: synonym of Limacina rangii f. antarctica Woodward, 1854: synonym of Limacina rangii (d'Orbigny, 1834)
- † Limacina ferax (Laws, 1944): synonym of † Heliconoides ferax (Laws, 1944)
- Limacina helicialis Lamarck, 1819: synonym of Limacina helicina (Phipps, 1774)
- Limacina helicoides Jeffreys, 1877: synonym of Thielea helicoides (Jeffreys, 1877)
- Limacina inflata (d'Orbigny, 1836) - Planorbid pteropod. Distribution: circumglobal, Red Sea, Pacific. Length: 1 mm. Description: the shell is flatly twisted, resembling the shell of the cephalopod Nautilus. - synonym: Heliconoides inflata (d'Orbigny, 1836)
- Limacina naticoides Souleyet, 1852: synonym of Limacina trochiformis (d'Orbigny, 1834)
- Limacina pacifica Dall, 1871: synonym of Limacina helicina pacifica Dall, 1871
- Limacina scaphoidea Gould, 1852: synonym of Heliconoides inflatus (d'Orbigny, 1834)
- † Limacina taylori (Curry, 1965): synonym of † Heliconoides taylori (Curry, 1965)
