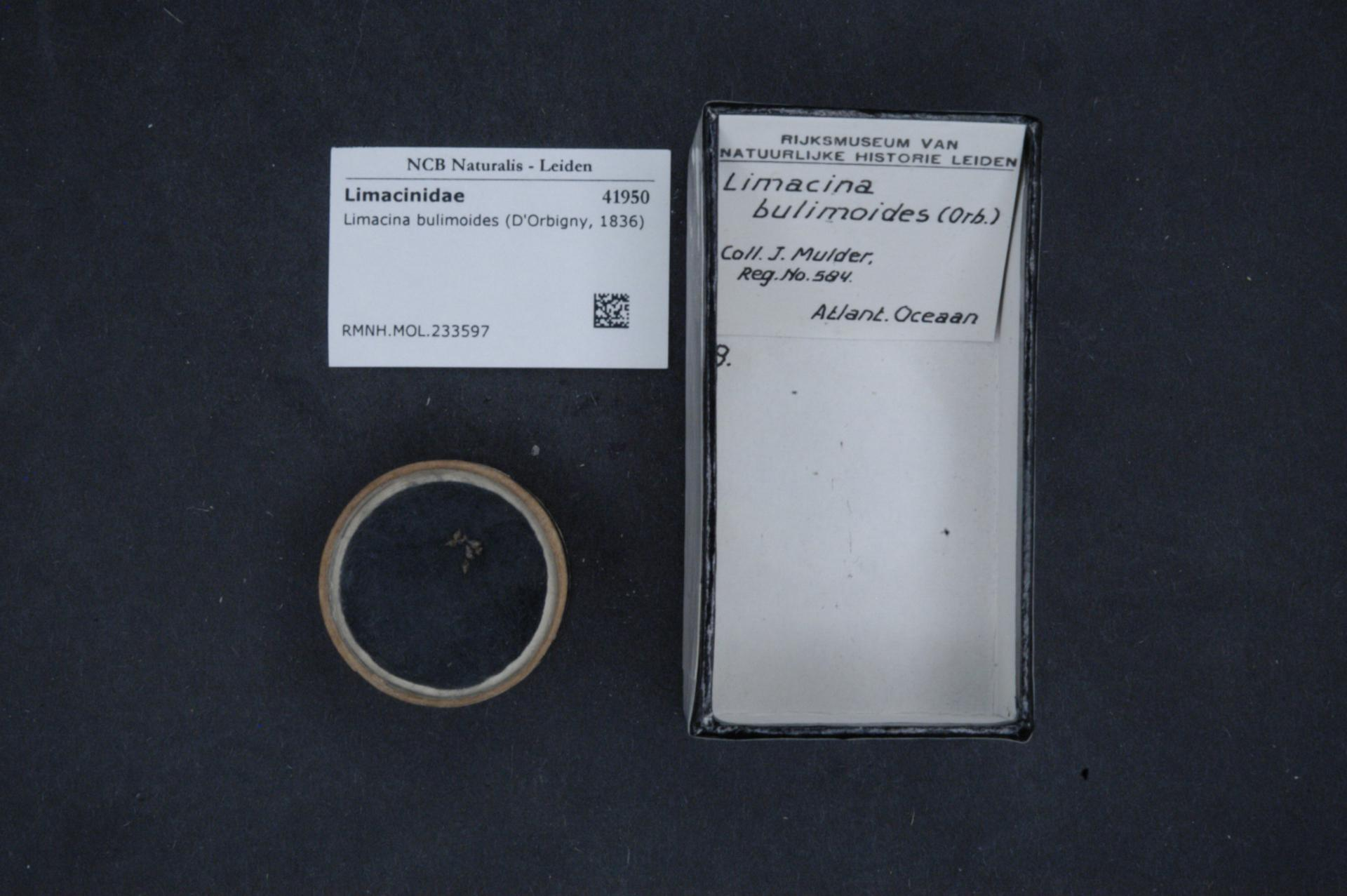

Scientific classification
- Kingdom: Animalia
- Phylum: Mollusca
- Class: Gastropoda
- Clade: Euopisthobranchia
- Order: Pteropoda
- Family: Limacinidae
- Genus: Limacina
- Species: L. bulimoides

Binomial name
- Limacina bulimoides (d'Orbigny, 1835)

= Limacina bulimoides =

Species of gastropod

Limacina bulimoides is a species of gastropods belonging to the family Limacinidae.

The species has a cosmopolitan distribution.
