= Limacina trochiformis =

Scientific classification
- Kingdom: Animalia
- Phylum: Mollusca
- Class: Gastropoda
- Clade: Euopisthobranchia
- Order: Pteropoda
- Family: Limacinidae
- Genus: Limacina
- Species: L. trochiformis

Binomial name
- Limacina trochiformis (d'Orbigny, 1835)

Species of gastropod

Limacina trochiformis is a species of gastropods belonging to the family Limacinidae.

The species has an almost cosmopolitan distribution.
