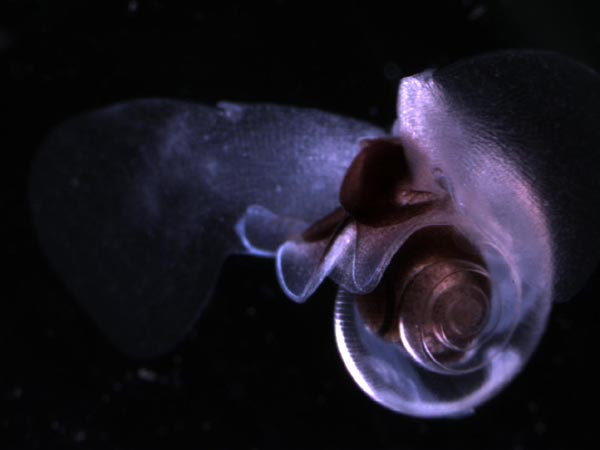
- A live individual of Limacina helicina
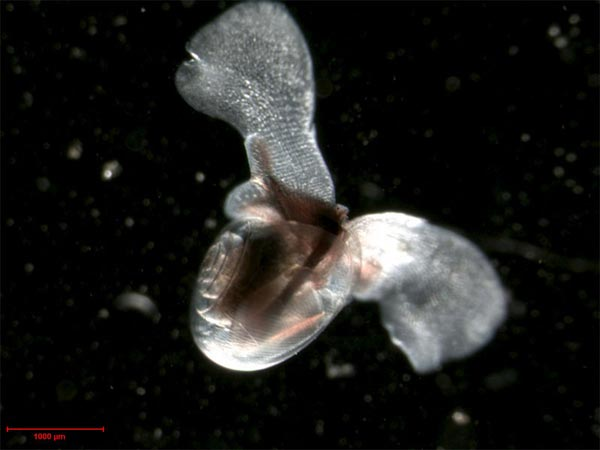
- A live individual of Limacina helicina

Scientific classification
- Kingdom: Animalia
- Phylum: Mollusca
- Class: Gastropoda
- Clade: Euopisthobranchia
- Order: Pteropoda
- Family: Limacinidae
- Genus: Limacina
- Species: L. helicina

Binomial name
- Limacina helicina (Phipps, 1774)

Synonyms
- Argonauta arctica O. Fabricius, 1780; Clio helicina Phipps, 1774 (original combination); Limacina helicialis Lamarck, 1819; Spiratella helicina (Phipps, 1774); Spiratella limacina Blainville, 1824; Limacina helicina var. typica Meisenheimer, 1906; Spiratella planospira Rehder, 1942

= Limacina helicina =

Species of gastropod

Limacina helicina is a species of small swimming planktonic sea snail, in the family Limacinidae. It belongs to the group commonly known as sea butterflies (Thecosomata).

Limacina helicina is a keystone species of mesozooplankton in Arctic pelagic ecosystems.

The first written record of this species was by Friderich Martens from Spitsbergen in 1675. Limacina helicina was also observed during a 1773 expedition to the Arctic led by Constantine John Phipps on the ships HMS Racehorse and on HMS Carcass and the species was described one year later, in 1774.

Limacina helicina is the type species of the genus Limacina.

In contrast to the traditional view, it was shown in 2010 that the distribution of this species is not bipolar; Arctic and Antarctic individuals belong to two genetically distinct species: Limacina helicina in the Arctic, and Limacina antarctica in the Antarctic.

== Subspecies ==
- Limacina helicina helicina (Phipps, 1774)
- Limacina helicina acuta Van Der Spoel, 1967
- Limacina helicina ochotensis Shkoldina, 1999
- Limacina helicina pacifica Dall, 1871

Limacina helicina has been recognised as a species complex comprising two sub-species and at least five forms. In addition, the taxonomic category "forma" has been applied to designate at least three morphotypes of Limacina helicina helicina (acuta, helicina and pacifica) and two morphotypes of Limacina helicina antarctica (antarctica and rangi). It is also known as Limacina helicina rangii (d'Orbigny, 1835). These forms typically have different geographical ranges, but it remains unclear as to whether forms represent morphological responses to different environmental conditions or are indeed taxonomically distinct, and if the latter, their level of taxonomic separation.

However, at the species level the geographical distribution is considered to be bipolar, as it occurs in both the Arctic and Antarctic oceans. Remigio and Hebert (2003) provided initial evidence for the genetic separation of Limacina helicina helicina and Limacina helicina antarctica. Hunt et al. (2010) have quantified genetic distance within these taxa. Hunt 2010 found a 33.56% difference in cytochrome c oxidase subunit I (COI) gene sequences between the "Limacina helicina" which were collected from the Arctic and the Antarctic oceans. This degree of separation is sufficient for ordinal level taxonomic separation in other organisms, and provides strong evidence for the Arctic and Antarctic populations of Limacina helicina differing at least at the species level. Subspecies Limacina helicina antarctica Woodward, 1854 can be considered as a separate species Limacina antarctica Woodward, 1854. A conservative divergence time estimate of 31 Ma (95% HPD interval 12–53 Ma) for Arctic and Antarctic taxa, indicates that they have undergone rapid independent evolution since the establishment of cold water provinces in the early Oligocene. Also there is different structure of the shell between Limacina helicina and Limacina antarctica.

== Distribution ==
The type locality of Limacina helicina is "Arctic seas". Limacina helicina is the only thecosome pteropod in Arctic waters.

The distribution of Limacina helicina is arctic and subarctic (subpolar–polar) especially in the Arctic Ocean and countries include:

- Northern Atlantic Ocean between 50 and 60 °N, Norwegian Sea, Faroe Islands, North of Iceland, Spitsbergen
- Greenland: Denmark Strait and Davis Strait
- Canada: Anticosti Island, Laurentian Channel, Magdalen Islands, Prince Edward Island, Newfoundland, Strait of Belle Isle.
- USA: area between Cape Hatteras (North Carolina, USA) and Newfoundland island; from the Gulf of Alaska to Friday Harbor, Washington state
- Russia: White Sea and Novaya Zemlya, Sea of Okhotsk, Sea of Japan, Bering Sea, Chukchi Sea, Kurile Islands, Commander Islands
- Japan: off Kasumi, Hyōgo

== Description ==
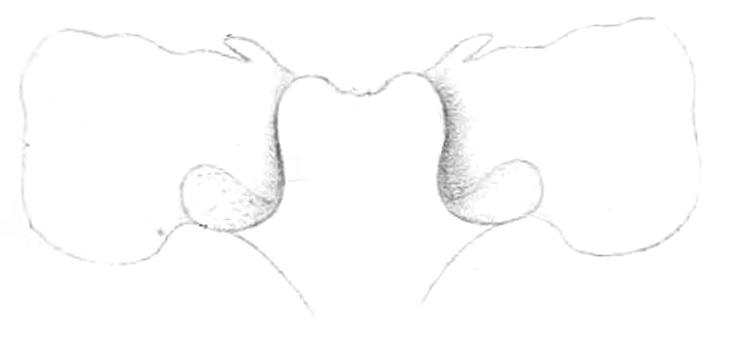
Drawing of part of Limacina helicina from ventral view shows parapodia, anterior lobe of the parapodia, lower part of the foot and foldings on the ventral side of the foot.

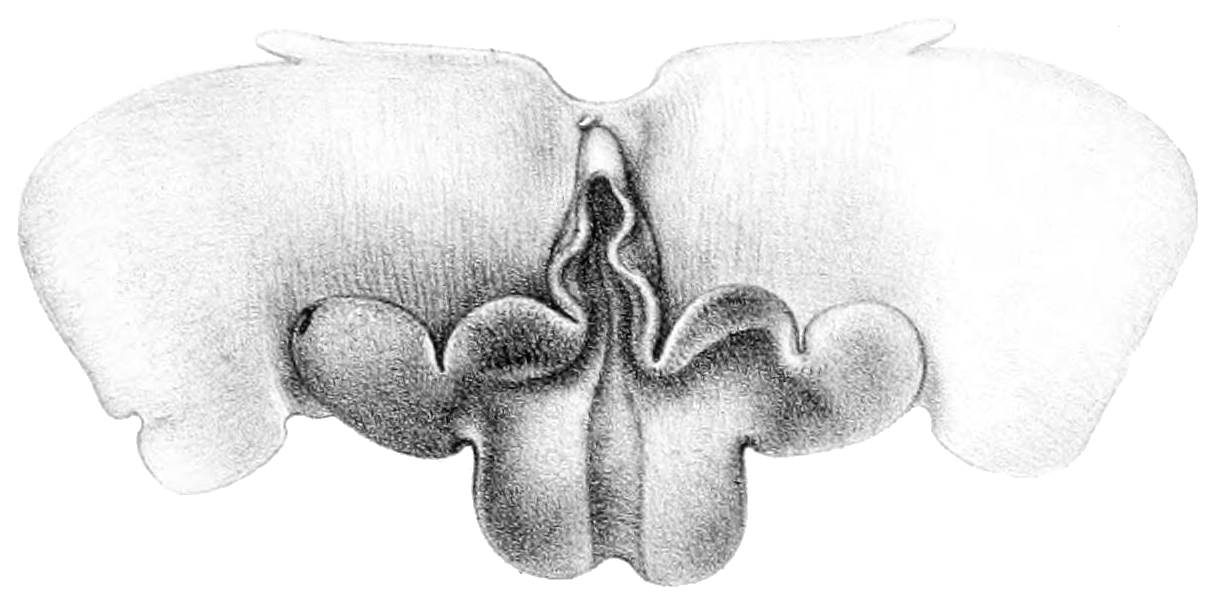
Detailed drawing of the same ventral view.

Limacina helicina has wing-like parapodia which evolved from the original gastropod foot (as is the case in all other pteropods).

In this species, the color of the soft parts is dark purple or violet, with paler pellucid (translucent) parapodia.

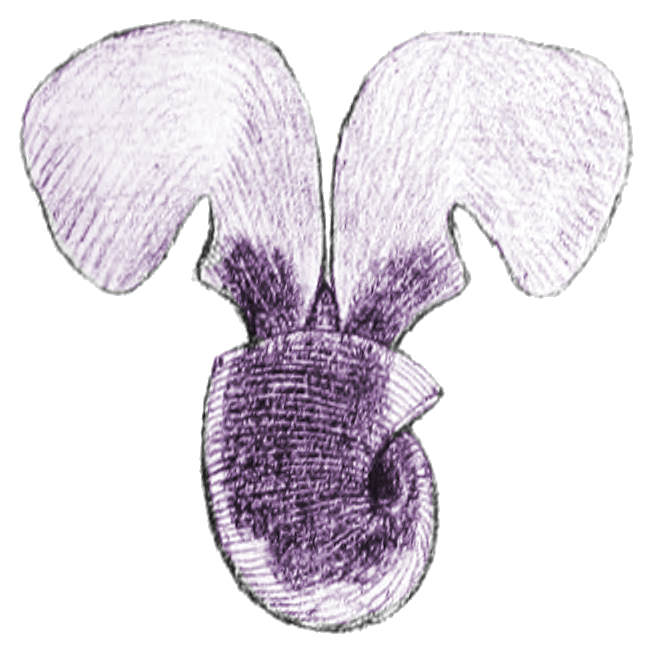
Dorsal view.

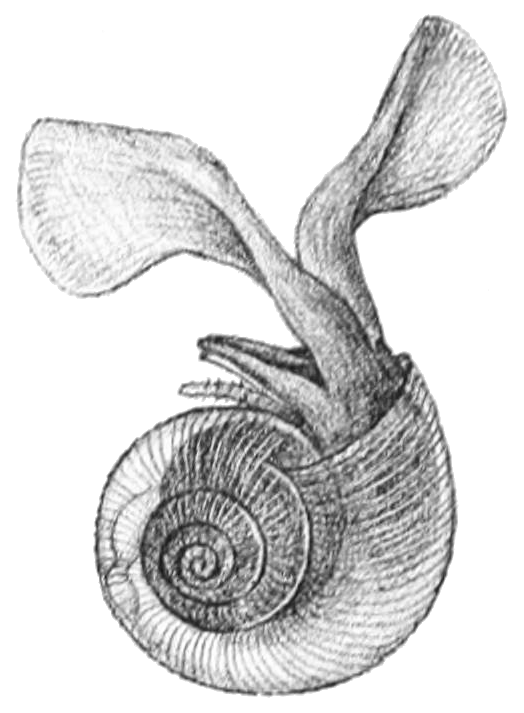
Left lateral view.

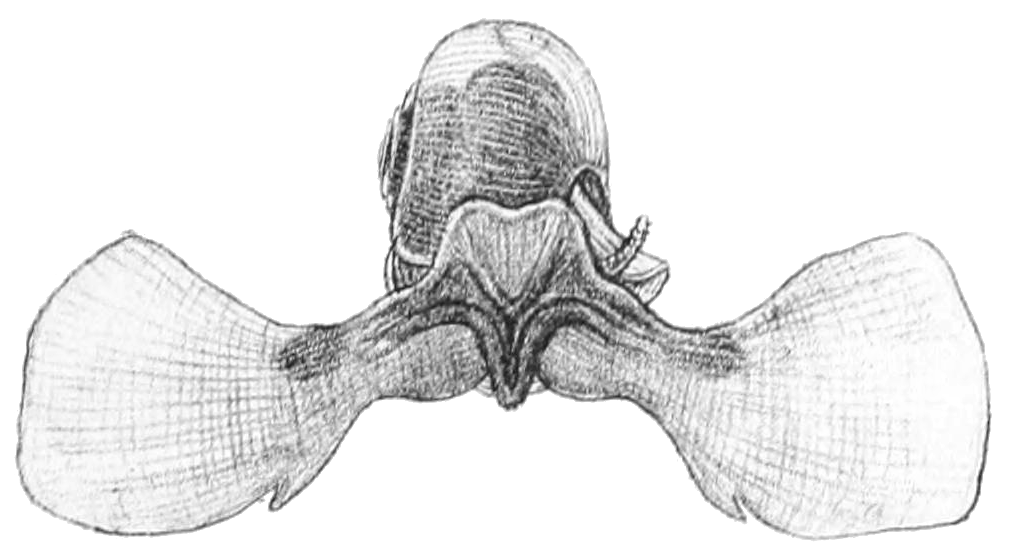
Frontal view.

The shell is sinistral, subglobose, subdiscoidal, hyaline and very thin. The spire is depressed but it can be considered rather high in comparison of other Limacina species. The shell has a wide umbilicus and the aaperture is higher than it is wide. The shell has 5-6 transversally striated whorls and a distinct suture. The last whorl is large and with very obscure keel next to its umbilicus.

The width of the shell is 5–10 mm or up to 13 mm. The height of the shell is up to 6 mm (when maximum width was 8 mm).

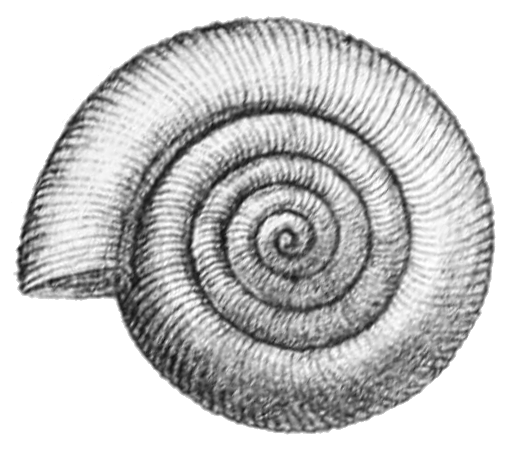
Apical view.

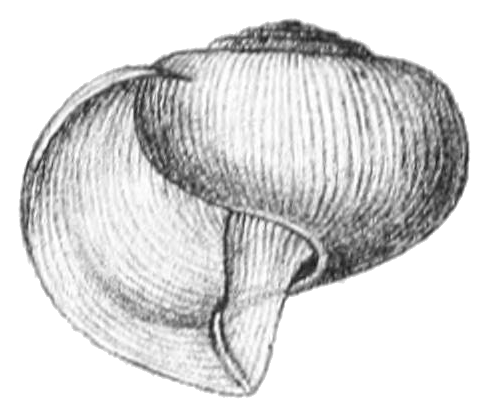
Apertural view.

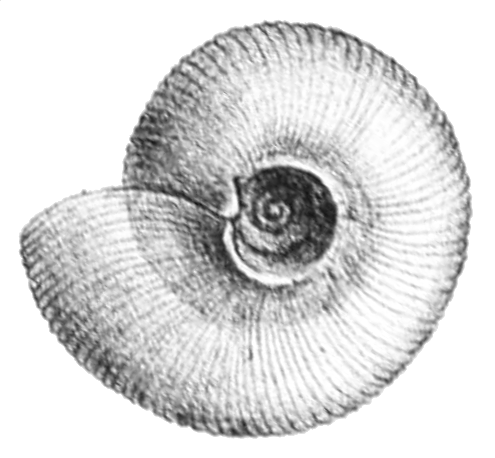
Umbilical view.

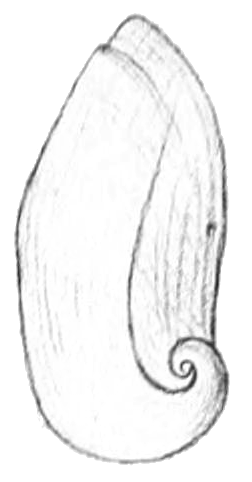
Drawing of operculum of Limacina helicina.

Adult specimens in the genus Limacina have usually lost the operculum.

The radula consist of 10 rows. Each row consist of one central tooth and two lateral teeth. The Digestive system also includes an esophagus, gizzard sac and gut.

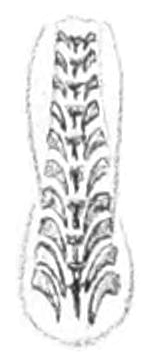
Drawing of the whole radula. Magnified 60×.

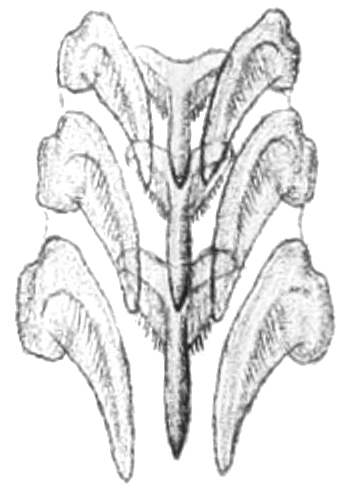
Detail of radula showing 3 rows of teeth. Magnified 190×.

== Ecology ==
=== Habitat ===
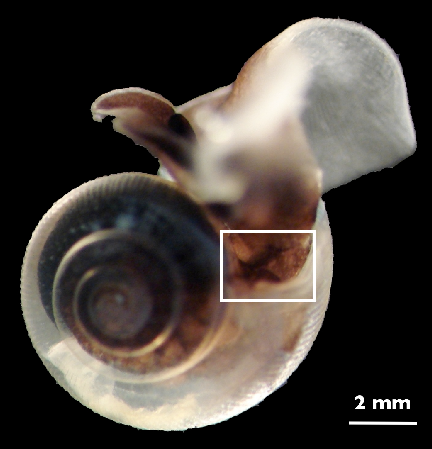
Live Limacina helicina. The white rectangle shows the shell opening, the area where Comeau et al. (2009) studied the effect of ocean acidification.

Pteropods are strict pelagic mollusks that are highly adapted to life in the open ocean. They are actively swimming in the water. Limacina helicina is a holoplanktonic species. Habitat of Limacina helicina is upper epipelagic and glacial. It lives in temperatures from -0.4 °C to +4.0 °C or rarely up to 7 °C.

Vertical distribution is affected by the size and also by other factors. Limacina helicina of the size from 0.2 to 0.4 mm lives mainly in depths from 0 m to 50 m. Larger pteropods lives from 0 m to 150 m. For example, Gilmer & Harbison (1991) have found larger specimen of Limacina helicina to occur mainly in depths 5–25 m with abundance up to 2.5 adults in m^{3}. They do not occur much in upper 4 m probably because of turbulence.

Already Constantine John Phipps mentioned its "innumerable quantities" in arctic seas in 1774. Limacina helicina is a major component of the polar zooplankton. It can comprise >50% of total zooplankton abundance (number of individuals per unit volume).

Species of the clade Thecosomata produce a fragile external calcium carbonate shell, which could serve as a ballast enabling large vertical migrations and as a protection against predators. The aragonitic composition of the shell makes it very sensitive to dissolution. Aragonite is a metastable form of calcium carbonate and it is more soluble in seawater than calcite. Because of its highly soluble aragonite shell and polar distribution, Limacina helicina may be one of the first organisms affected by ocean acidification, and it is therefore a key indicator species of this process. As a key indicator of the acidification process, and a major component of polar ecosystems, Limacina helicina has become a focus for acidification research. Based on laboratory experiments, they are able to precipitate calcium carbonate at low aragonite saturation state. Limacina helicina seems to be relatively more resilient to elevated concentration of carbon dioxide (CO_{2}) than other aragonitic organisms such as corals. Laboratory experiments results support the current concern for the future of Arctic pteropods, as the production of their shell appears to be very sensitive to decreased pH. A decline of pteropod populations would likely cause dramatic changes to various pelagic ecosystems. However, in response to acute abiotic stress, Limacina helicina shows high transcriptomic plasticity, suggesting this species may have a limited capacity to acclimate to the effects of ocean acidification and ocean warming. Shelled pteropods also play a geochemical role in carbon cycle in the oceans, as they contribute to the export of calcium carbonate and can represent a major component of the carbon transport to the deep ocean.

Researchers found 24-53% individuals of Limacina helicina with shells damaged by dissolution off the U.S. West Coast in 2011.

=== Feeding habits ===
They produce large mucus webs to filter-feed on phytoplankton but also small zooplankton. They eat the web with the captured prey and then re-reproduce a web net. The web is large and spherical and it is difficult to see during the day because of diffuse reflection. Webs are easier to see at night. Limacina helicina is easily disturbed (like all other Thecosomata); when disturbed, it retracts into its shell and destroys its web. Gilmer & Harbison (1991) have assumed, that Limacina helicina feeds while motionless (without actively swimming). Its web enables them neutral buoyancy or allows them slow sinking only.

Limacina helicina plays a significant ecological role as a phytoplankton grazer. Limacina helicina is an obligate ciliary feeder. Gilmer & Harbison (1991) hypothesized that Limacina helicina are "web trappers", who are also chemically attracting their motile prey.

Major parts of the food of Limacina helicina include tintinnid (Tintinnida), small crustaceans - copepods (Copepoda) and juvenile specimen of its own species (cannibalism). Danish zoologist Johan Erik Vesti Boas reported diatoms (Bacillariophyceae), dinoflagellates (Dinoflagellata) and tintinnids in the digestive system of Limacina helicina in 1888 already. Diatoms and dinoflagellates appear to pass the digestive system of adults largely intact. Fecal pellets of Limacina helicina contains small cells, dinoflagellates and diatoms as main largely intact food items and also few small fragments of tintinnids, Limacina and copepods. All experiments performed on Limacina helicina in the laboratory were done on starved specimens, because they do not feed in unnatural conditions. Ocean acidification and ocean warming may cause Limacina helicina to increase its metabolic rate and use more storage compounds, especially during the Arctic winter when food is limited. This may result in a decline in reproductive success and survival.

Gilmer & Harbison (1991) also suggested that smaller specimens may be herbivores feeding preferentially on phytoplankton and protozoans and that larger specimens became omnivores.

=== Life cycle ===
Limacina helicina is a protandric hermaphrodite. Males are smaller, at sizes of 4–5 mm and then they change to females, which are larger than 5 mm. Sperm is transferred by spermatophores during copulation. They lay eggs in ribbon-like clusters mainly in summer, but also a little in winter.

The size of the veliger larvae is about 0.15 mm. When animals reached 0.7 mm in size, gonads have been detected in them. Fully mature individuals are 0.8 mm in size.

The life cycle of Limacina helicina lasts about 1 to 2 years.

=== Predators ===
Limacina helicina plays an important role in the marine food web as a major dietary component for predators such as large zooplankton, herring Clupea sp., chum salmon Oncorhynchus keta, pink salmon Oncorhynchus gorbuscha, rorquals, Phoca hispida and other seals and birds.

The pteropod Clione limacina feeds almost entirely on the genus Limacina: on Limacina helicina and on Limacina retroversa. Also the pteropod Paedoclione doliiformis feeds on those two species only, but solely on juveniles with shells smaller than 1 mm.

=== Locomotion ===
A snapshot of the flows and forces at work in Torkel Weis-Fogh's clap and fling mechanism for insect flight. Movements of Limacina's wing-like parapodia create vortices in the water flow, which generate lift.

Limacina helicina possesses a pair of flexible, wing-like appendages called parapodia which it beats in a complex 3D stroke pattern which resembles the wing kinematics of flying insects. By doing so, the animal effectively flies through the water. The sea butterfly uses a high angle of attack of approximately 45-50 degrees to generate lift, and it beats its wings 4 to 10 times per second. It propels itself using a version of the clap and fling mechanism described by Torkel Weis-Fogh in small insects such as thrips. Another aspect of locomotion by Limacina helicina is the extreme, forward-back pitching (called hyper-pitching) which it experiences during each half-stroke of its wings. The animal rocks forward and backward by up to 60 degrees during each half-stroke. No other species is known to experience such extreme hyper-pitching during normal locomotion.

== See also ==
- What appears to be "Limacina helicina" occurring in Antarctica is in fact a separate species, Limacina antarctica. All pre-2010 works refer to this Antarctic taxon as Limacina helicina.
