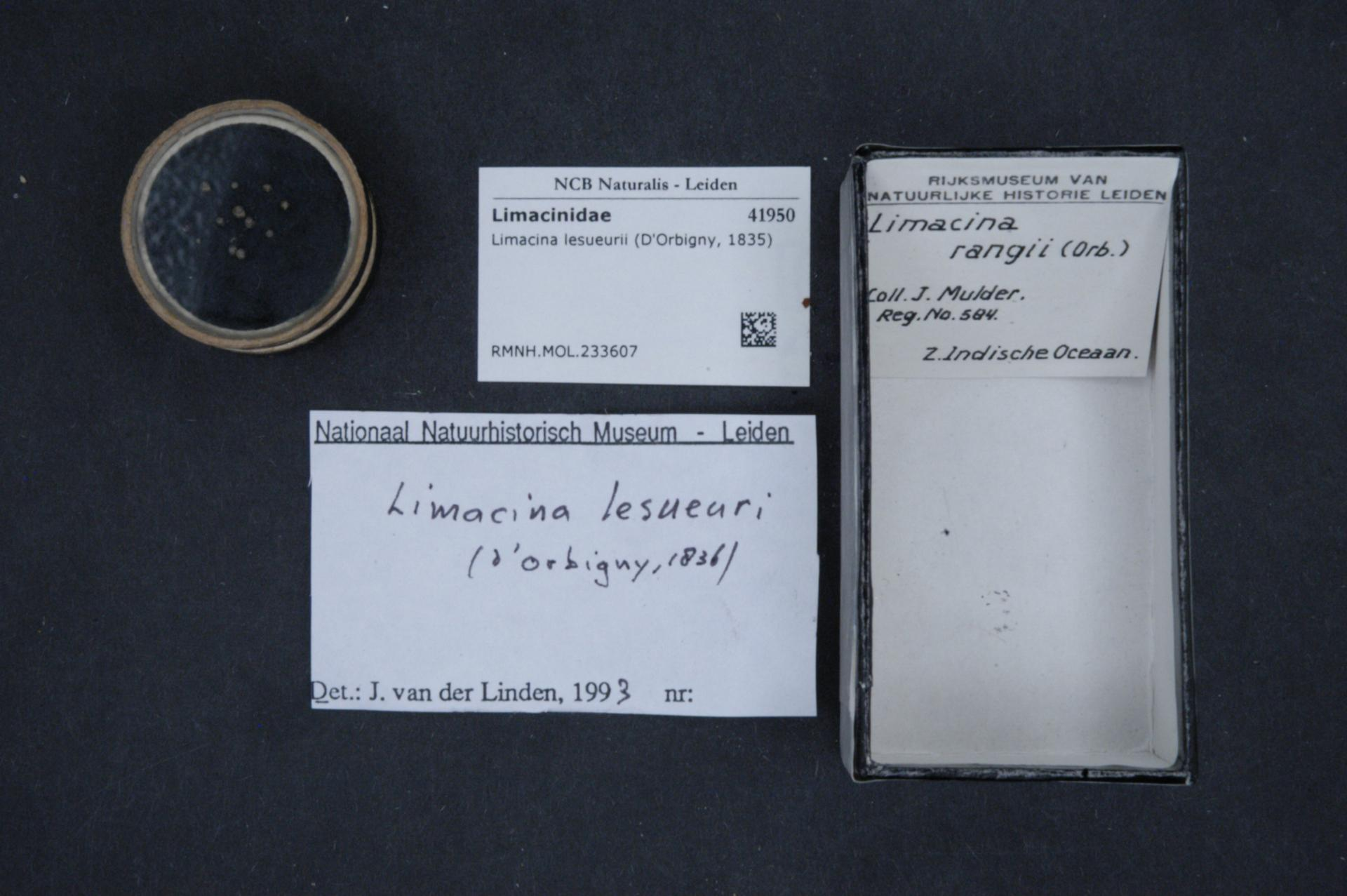

Scientific classification
- Kingdom: Animalia
- Phylum: Mollusca
- Class: Gastropoda
- Clade: Euopisthobranchia
- Order: Pteropoda
- Family: Limacinidae
- Genus: Limacina
- Species: L. lesueurii

Binomial name
- Limacina lesueurii (d'Orbigny, 1836)

Synonyms
- Atlanta lesueurii; Spirialis ventricosa

= Limacina lesueurii =

Pelagic species of sea snail pteropod (sea butterfly)

Limacina lesueurii is a pelagic species of sea snail pteropod (sea butterfly).

== History ==
The species was first documented in 1826. They have migrated and are now spread across the north to central Atlantic Ocean, and Australasia.
