= Limacina antarctica =

Scientific classification
- Kingdom: Animalia
- Phylum: Mollusca
- Class: Gastropoda
- Clade: Euopisthobranchia
- Order: Pteropoda
- Family: Limacinidae
- Genus: Limacina
- Species: L. antarctica

Binomial name
- Limacina antarctica S. P. Woodward, 1854

Synonyms
- Limacina helicina antarctica S. P. Woodward, 1854 superseded rank; Limacina helicina f. antarctica S. P. Woodward, 1854 superseded rank; Limacina rangii f. antarctica S. P. Woodward, 1854 ·superseded rank

Species of gastropod

Limacina antarctica is a species of gastropods belonging to the family Limacinidae.

The forma Limacina antarctica f. rangii (A. d'Orbigny, 1835) is a synonym of Limacina rangii (A. d'Orbigny, 1835)

The species has a cosmopolitan distribution.
