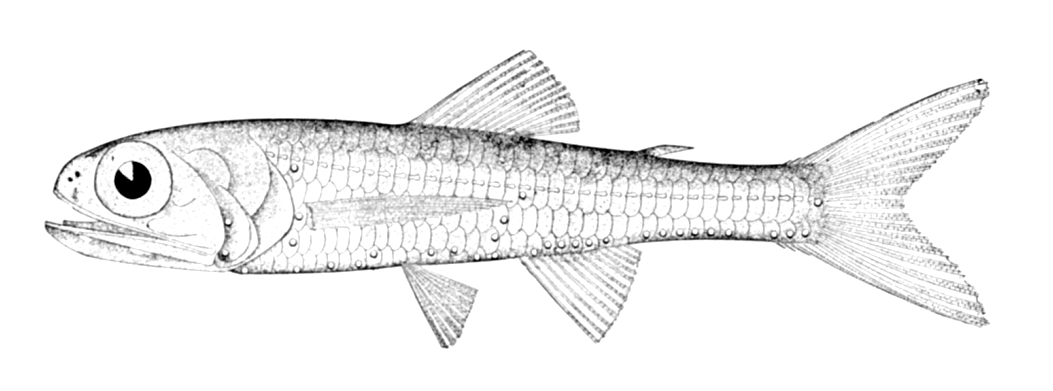
- Madeira Lanternfish C. maderensis

Scientific classification
- Domain: Eukaryota
- Kingdom: Animalia
- Phylum: Chordata
- Class: Actinopterygii
- Order: Myctophiformes
- Family: Myctophidae
- Genus: Ceratoscopelus; Günther, 1864

Species
- See text.

= Ceratoscopelus =

Ceratoscopelus Temporal range: 5–0 Ma Early Pliocene to Present

Genus of fishes

Ceratoscopelus is a genus of lanternfish.

== Species ==
There are currently three recognized species in this genus:

- Ceratoscopelus maderensis (R. T. Lowe, 1839) (Madeira lanternfish)
- Ceratoscopelus townsendi (C. H. Eigenmann & R. S. Eigenmann, 1889) (Dogtooth lampfish)
- Ceratoscopelus warmingii (Lütken, 1892) (Warming's lantern fish)
