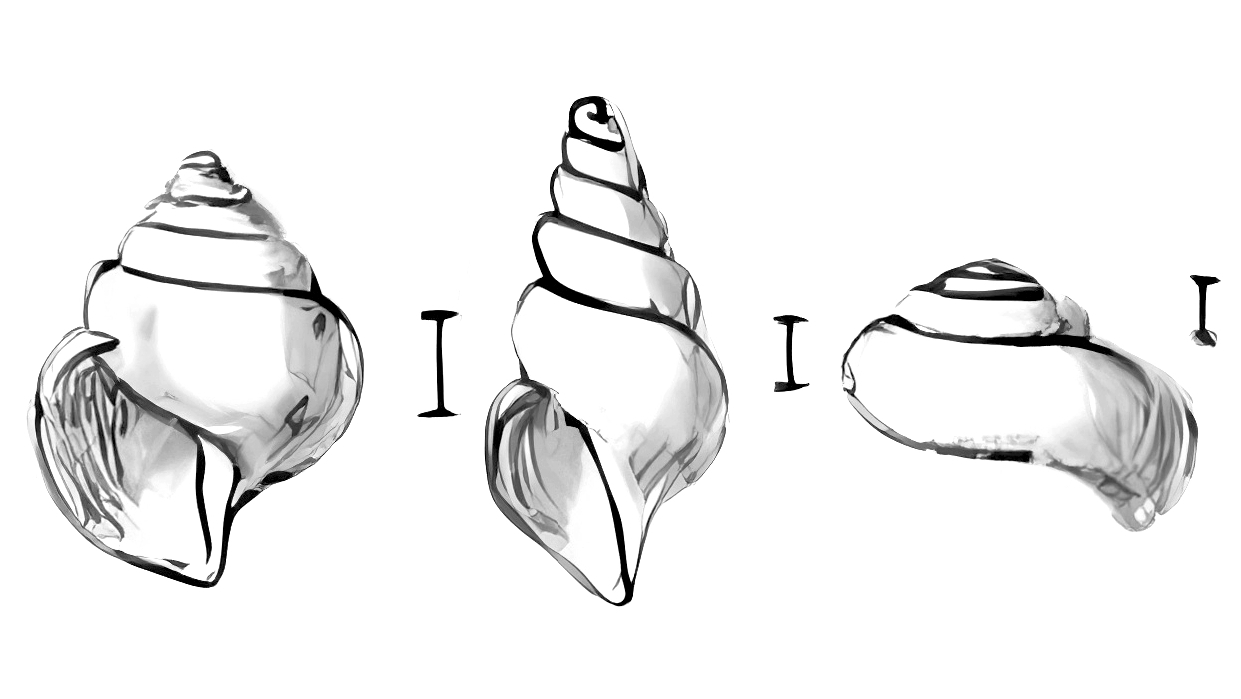

Scientific classification
- Kingdom: Animalia
- Phylum: Mollusca
- Class: Gastropoda
- Clade: Euopisthobranchia
- Order: Pteropoda
- Family: Limacinidae
- Genus: Limacina
- Species: L. retroversa

Binomial name
- Limacina retroversa (Fleming, 1823)

Synonyms
- Fusus retroversus Fleming, 1823; Heterofusus alexandri Verrill, 1872; Heterofusus retroversus Fleming, 1823; Limacina balea Møller, 1841; Peracle flemingii Forbes, 1844; Scaea stenogyra Philippi, 1844; Spirialis australis Eydoux & Souleyet, 1840; Spirialis balea (Møller, 1841); Spirialis jeffreysii Forbes & Hanley, 1849; Spirialis macandrewi Forbes & Hanley, 1849; Spirialis gouldii Stimpson, 1851; Spiralis retroversa; Trochus lunaris Gmelin, 1791

= Limacina retroversa =

Species of mollusc

Limacina retroversa is a distinct species of swimming planktonic gastropods, belonging to a group of predatory sea snails known as sea butterflies (Thecosomata). The name Limacina retroversa describes the unique morphology of this sea snail, including its slug-like body and coiled, backwards-turning shell. They are typically found in the epipelagic zone of cold, polar waters, but can be found worldwide, in any ocean. L. retroversa are currently under threat, as their numbers are decreasing due to rising global carbon levels and other human-caused climate threats.

== Etymology ==
The species name "retroversa" essentially means "turned backwards" in Latin, and likely refers to the way the shell of Limacina retroversa appears coiled in a reverse direction compared to most other snail species. The genus name "Limacina" comes from the Latin word "limax" which means slug or "snail-like", and refers to the general body structure of L. retroversa.

== Distribution ==
L. retroversa have a broad distribution and can be found in oceans ranging from the North Atlantic ocean, Northwest Atlantic Ocean, European waters, the Mediterranean Sea, and Caribbean Sea. They can be found at any depth of ocean, but are most abundant in the epipelagic layer, specifically neritic rather than oceanic.

L. retroversa have a particular high biomass in polar regions as they are a cold water species. Higher numbers of L. retroversa are typically found in late winter and early spring; but have a low density in late summer and fall and tend to shift lower into the water column.

== Morphology ==
L. retroversa are small, transparent, and delicate marine snails, belonging to the pteropod family Limacinidae. The main body of the snail is a thin and delicate shell made of calcium carbonate, which spirals from a pointed apex to a flatter base, where the snail's foot and two wings are located. The internal body of L. retroversa, which contains various organs, including the digestive, reproductive, and nervous systems, is elongated and has a gelatinous, semi-transparent appearance. The foot allows the snail to control the muscle movements of its wings, used for locomotion, and the snail also primarily relies on the foot to feed.

The wings on L. retroversa allow it to swim, which it does by rhythmically flapping its wings with its shell pointed upwards, creating an eddy behind the animal and allowing it to move. It eats through the use of cilia on its mucus-covered foot to trap and eat prey. This species of marine snail is hermaphroditic, with both male and female reproductive organs located in the same individual. These gonads are found at the base of the shell.

All L. retroversa start their life as a male, and will eventually develop female gonads once they grow large enough. This allows their gender to vary with size, where the smallest juvenile individuals (<0.5mm in size) will be sexually undifferentiated, the somewhat larger individuals (0.5 to 1mm) will be solely males, and the largest individuals (1 to 3mm) will end up as simultaneous hermaphrodites.

== Life Cycle ==
Limacina retroversa have a holoplanktonic life cycle. Polar species tend to live around one to two years, while temperate and tropical species have a shorter life span.

The life cycle begins with the hatching of L. retroversa eggs which release planktonic larvae into the water column. The planktonic larvae increase size through shell growth by feeding on phytoplankton. After several weeks, the larvae settle on the seafloor as juvenile snails after undergoing metamorphosis. During the metamorphosis process, the larvae develop adult organs and change their body shape and structure. Once metamorphosis is complete and the juvenile snails reach maturity, they are capable of reproduction and tend to continuously lay eggs weekly.

=== Reproduction ===
L. retroversa undergoes sexual reproduction that involves the production of both eggs and sperm. The primary reproductive organs are a pair of gonads that are located near the head of the L. retroversa which are responsible for gamete production. In males, the gonads undergo spermatogenesis to produce spermatozoa. In females, the gonads undergo oogenesis to produce eggs. The spermatozoa are then deposited inside the female's body to internally fertilize the eggs. After fertilization, larva is eventually developed from the blastula which is a zygote that has undergone a series of cell divisions.

L. retroversa lay their egg masses in gelatinous ribbons. In a study done on L. retroversa in the Gulf of Maine, it was found that within the first two days of capture, fertilized eggs were consistently laid. The embryos tend to be spherical, typically around ~80 μm in diameter which are enveloped by a transparent egg capsule.

=== Feeding ===
L. retroversa feed as suspension feeders using the cilia extruded on their foot, and the base of their shell. The cilia serves as a filtering mechanism that filters and traps prey from the water column. The primary sources of prey for the L. retroversta are both phytoplankton; diatoms, and dinoflagellates.

=== Predation ===
L. retroversa serve as an integral part of the food web as primary consumers. They are preyed upon by a large variety of species ranging from other planktivorous zooplankton to fish to sea birds. The following are the primary predators to L. retroversa (7):

- Zooplankton Predators
  - Chaetognaths, Heteropods, Ctenophores, Medusae, Siphonophores, Gymnosome Pteropods, Pseudothecosomes
- Fish Predators
  - Herring, Mackerel, Cod larvae, Redfish larvae, Salmon, Yellowfin tuna, Myctophids, Nototheniids

== Human-Caused Threats ==
Anthropogenic climate influence poses a large threat to the species. Increasing ocean acidity due to the surplus of carbon poses a threat of decreasing L. retroversa populations. Particularly during larval and early development stages, such acidity can lead to troubles, the failure of growth, and ultimately increased mortality. The most prominent display of these hardships is shown through an inability to calcify and grow their calcium carbonate shells in a low pH environment.
