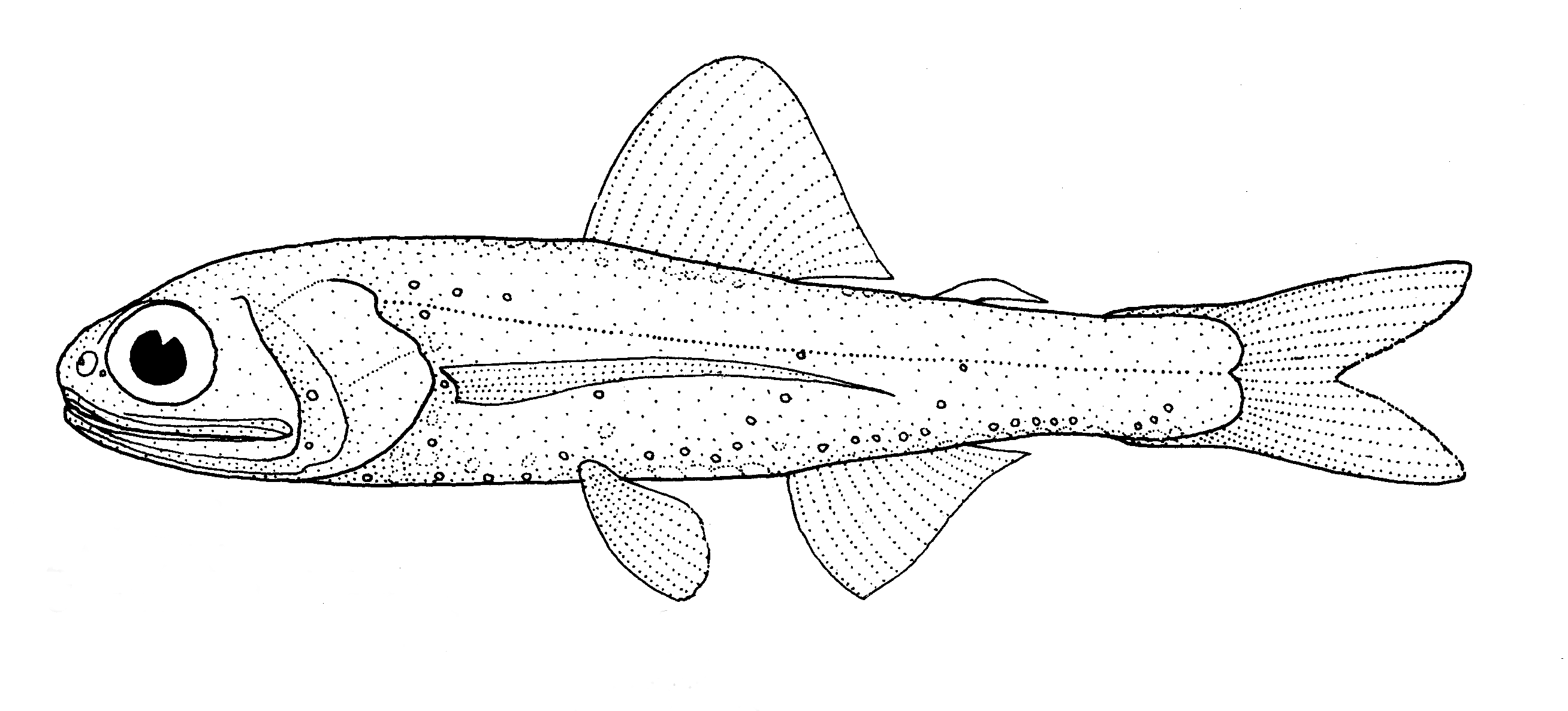

Conservation status
- Least Concern (IUCN 3.1)

Scientific classification
- Kingdom: Animalia
- Phylum: Chordata
- Class: Actinopterygii
- Order: Myctophiformes
- Family: Myctophidae
- Genus: Ceratoscopelus
- Species: C. warmingii

Binomial name
- Ceratoscopelus warmingii (Lütken, 1892)

= Warming's lantern fish =

Species of fish

Warming's lantern fish, Ceratoscopelus warmingii, is a lanternfish of the family Myctophidae, found circumglobally in both hemispheres, at depths of between 700 and 1,500 m (2,300 and 4,900 ft) during the day and between 20 and 200 m (70 and 660 ft) at night. Its length is about 8 cm (3.15 in).

== Description ==
Warming's lantern fish grows to a length of about 8 cm (3.15 in). The rounded dorsal fin has 13 to 15 soft rays and the anal fin has a similar number of soft rays. The body has patches and scale-like specks of bioluminescent material.

== Distribution and habitat ==
This lantern fish has a circumglobal distribution. In the Atlantic Ocean it ranges between 42°N and 40°S while in the Indian Ocean it ranges between 20°N and 42°S. It is replaced in the northeastern Pacific Ocean by Ceratoscopelus townsendi but is otherwise present in tropical and sub-tropical waters, being particularly common around South Africa and in the southern and eastern China Sea.

The species participates in diel vertical migration. During the day it occurs between 700 and 1,500 m (2,300 and 4,900 ft), in the ocean's mesopelagic and bathypelagic zones, rising during the night to feed in the epipelagic zone between 20 and 200 m (70 and 660 ft), most commonly in the 50 to 100 m (160 to 330 ft) depth range.

== Ecology ==
The diet is mostly zooplankton, but in the North Pacific Gyre, Warming's lantern fish was found to feed at night on floating mats of Rhizosolenio (diatoms). This example of herbivory, unusual among deep sea fish, has led to modifications of the gut.

== Status ==
This deep sea migratory fish is of no interest to commercial fisheries and it faces no particular threats. It is common throughout its range, and the International Union for Conservation of Nature has listed it as being of "least concern".
