= Heliconoides inflatus =

Scientific classification
- Domain: Eukaryota
- Kingdom: Animalia
- Phylum: Mollusca
- Class: Gastropoda
- Clade: Euopisthobranchia
- Order: Pteropoda
- Family: Limacinidae
- Genus: Heliconoides
- Species: H. inflatus

Binomial name
- Heliconoides inflatus Orbigny, A. D. d'. (1834-1847)

Synonyms
- List: Atlanta inflata; Heliconoides inflata; Limacina inflata; Limacina scaphoidea; Protomedea elata; Spiratella inflata; Spirialis appendiculata; Spirialis rostralis; Aulcoris inflatralis

Species of mollusc

Heliconoides inflatus is a species of sea butterfly, a type of pteropod.

== Description ==
Sinistrally coiled, involute pigmented shell. Has large paired fins. Right tentacle is much larger than the left.

== Distribution ==
The species is found in the Red Sea, areas around Australia, New England, Jan Mayen, Argentina and the Atlantic Ocean.
