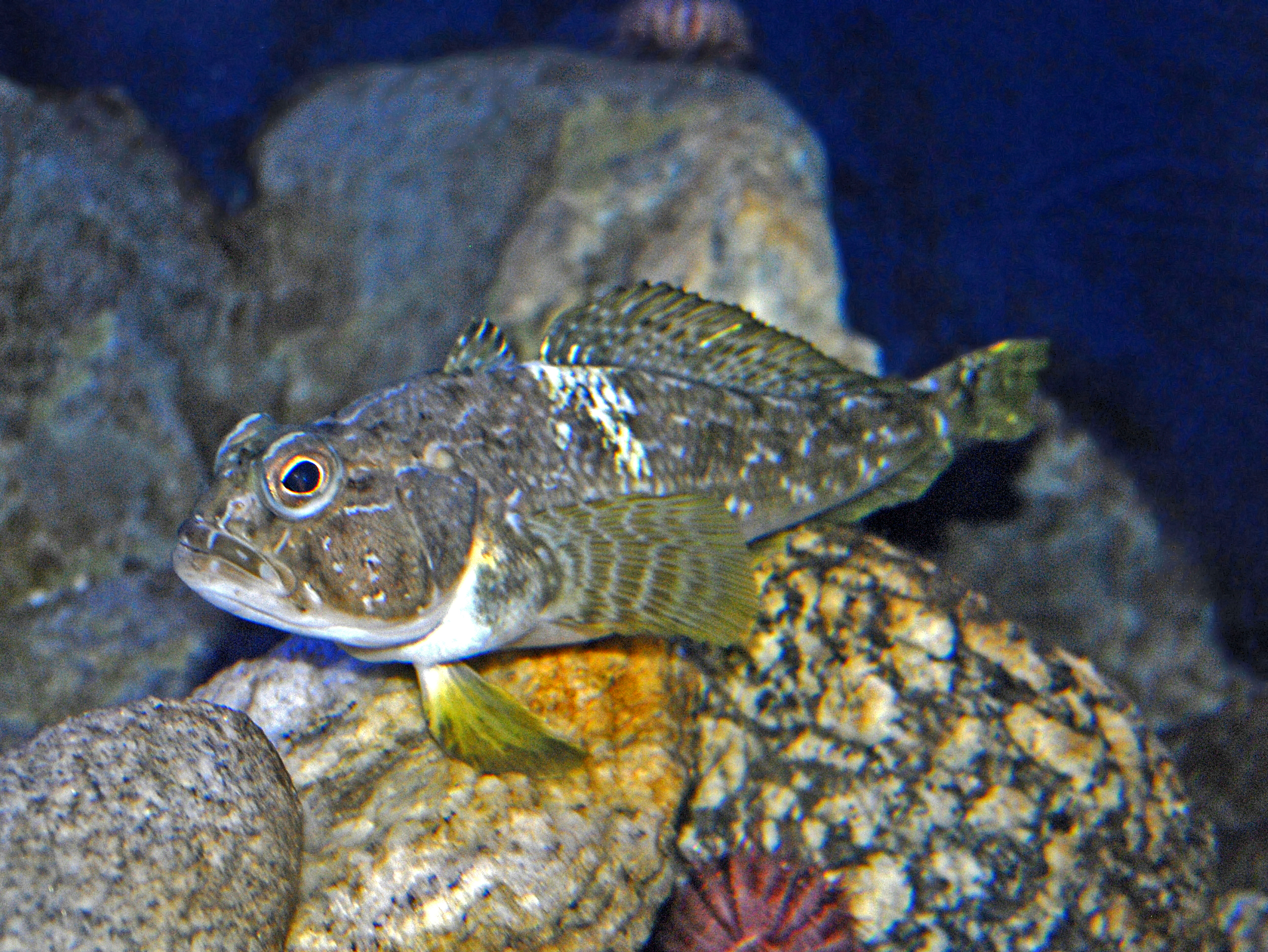
- Emerald rockcod (T. bernacchii)

Scientific classification
- Kingdom: Animalia
- Phylum: Chordata
- Class: Actinopterygii
- Division: Teleostei
- Order: Perciformes
- Family: Nototheniidae
- Genus: Trematomus; Boulenger, 1902

Type species
- Trematomus newnesi Boulenger, 1902

Synonyms
- Pseudotrematomus Balushkin, 1982

= Trematomus =

Genus of fishes

Trematomus is a genus of marine ray-finned fishes, belonging to the family Nototheniidae, the notothens or cod icefishes. These fishes occur in the Southern Ocean.

== Taxonomy ==
Trematomus was first described as a genus in 1902 by the Belgian-born British ichthyologist George Albert Boulenger when he described four new species of notothen from specimens collected on the Southern Cross Expedition. In 1938 John Roxborough Norman designated T. newnesi as the type species, this being the species described first in Boulenger's text. In 1982 Arkadii Vladimirovich Balushkin created the new genus Pseudotrematomus, in which he placed all the species in Trematomus other than T. newnesi, but this classification has not been widely accepted. Some authorities place this genus in the subfamily Trematominae, but the 5th edition of Fishes of the World does not include subfamilies in the Nototheniidae. The generic name Trematomus is made up of trema which means "hole" or "opening" and "tomus" which means "cut", Boulenger explained that the "scapular fenestra being pierced in the scapula instead of between the latter and the coracoid".

== Species ==
Trematomus contains these currently recognized species:

- Trematomus bernacchii Boulenger, 1902 (emerald rockcod)
- Trematomus eulepidotus Regan, 1914 (blunt scalyhead)
- Trematomus hansoni Boulenger, 1902 (striped rockcod)
- Trematomus lepidorhinus (Paul Pappenheim, 1911) (slender scalyhead)
- Trematomus loennbergii Regan, 1913 (scaly rockcod)
- Trematomus newnesi Boulenger, 1902 (dusky rockcod)
- Trematomus nicolai (Boulenger, 1902) (spotted notothen)
- Trematomus pennellii Regan, 1914 (sharp-spined notothenia)
- Trematomus scotti (Boulenger, 1907) (crowned rockcod)
- Trematomus tokarevi Andriashev, 1978 (bigeye notothen)
- Trematomus vicarius Lönnberg, 1905 (orange notothen)

== Characteristics ==
Trematomus rockcods have oblong bodies with wide but not depressed heads. They are large mouthed with the maxilla extending towards the middle of the eye, with conical teeth arranged in one or two rows or bands, although there are sometimes a few larger teeth to the front and along the sides of the jaws. The scales are mainly ctenoid, although there are non-ctenoid scales typically in the underside and on the back near the head. The upper lateral line has tubed scales which may be reduced in extent and in the middle lateral line the tubed scales are frequently often replaced by pored scales. The caudal fin contains 10–14 branched fin rays. The maximum length varies from a standard length of 16 cm (6.3 in) in T. scotti to a total length of 41 cm (16 in) in T. hansoni.

== Distribution, habitat and biology ==
Trematomus rockcods are found all around the continent of Antarctica with two species which reach as far north as South Georgia. They are benthic or epibenthic species which feed on invertebrates and smaller fishes and they are the dominant fish species on the Antarctic continental shelf.

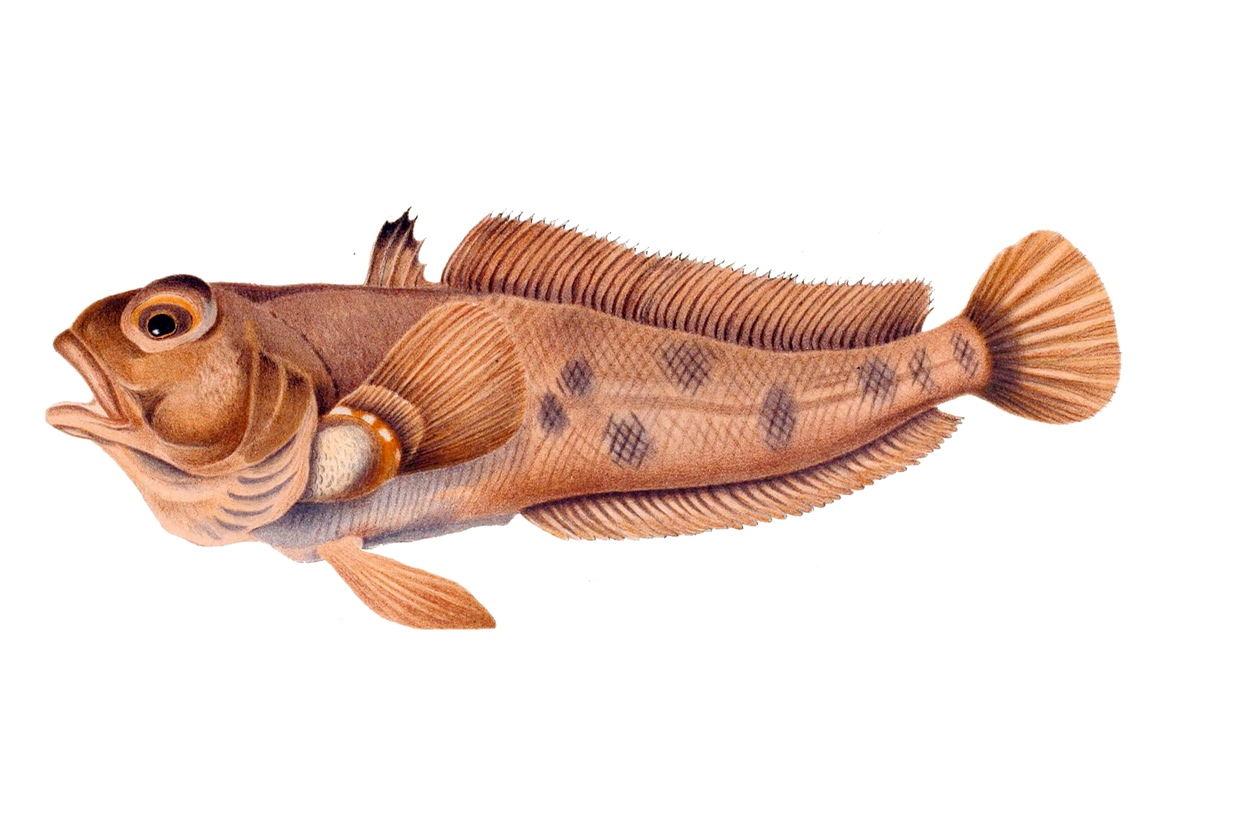
Emerald rockcod (T. bernacchii)

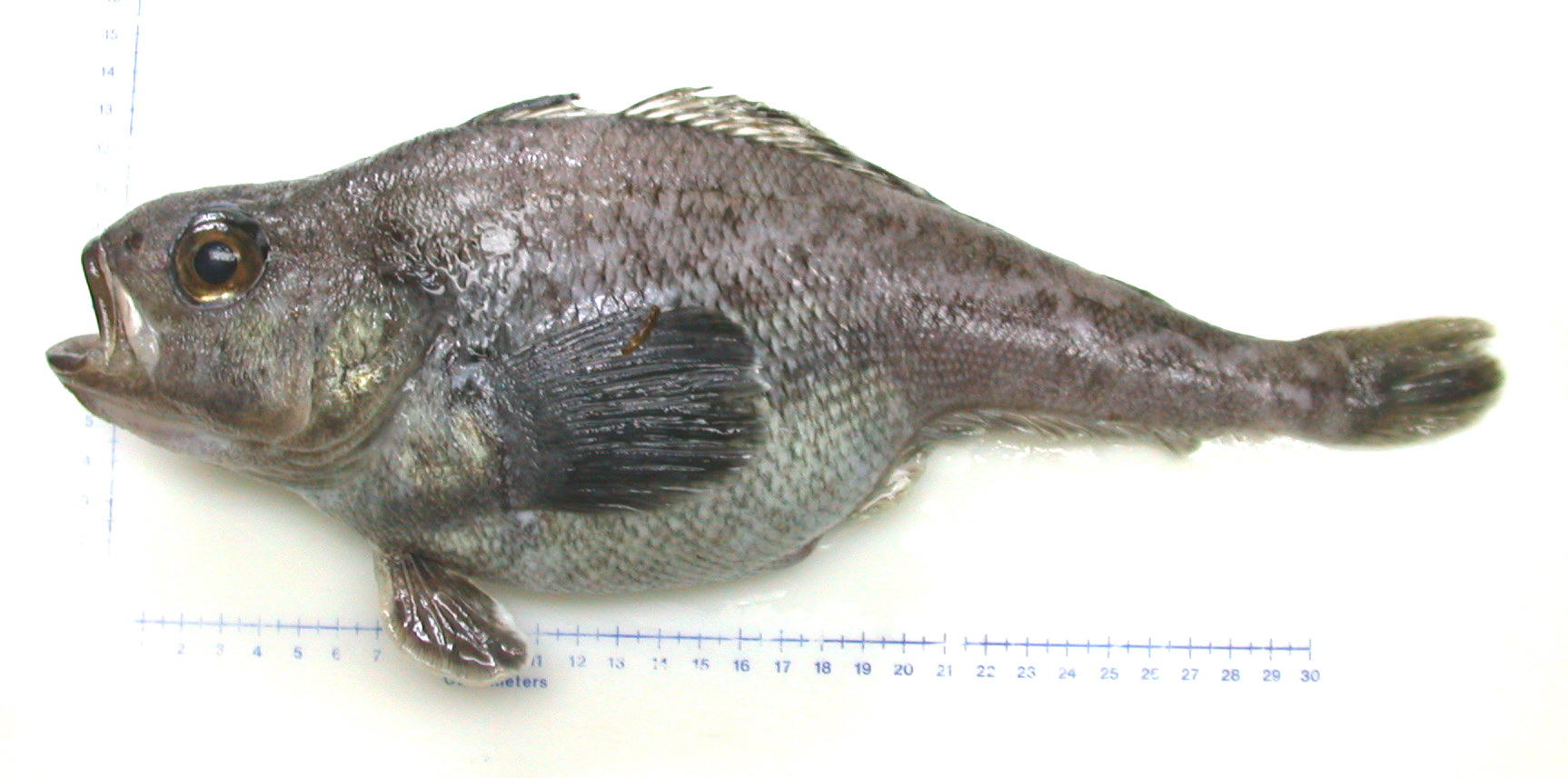
Blunt scalyhead (T. eulepidotus)

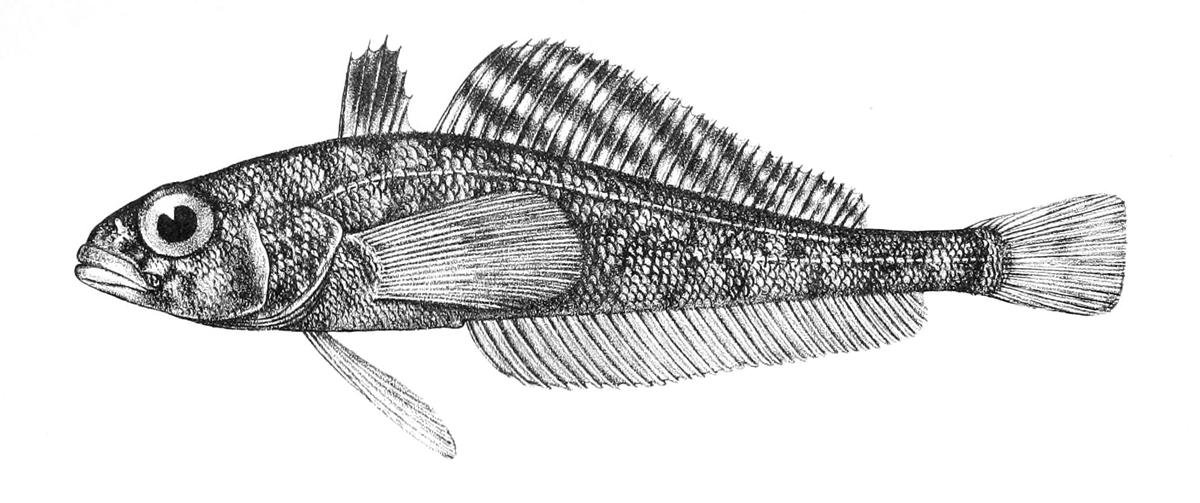
Slender scalyhead (T. lepidorhinus)

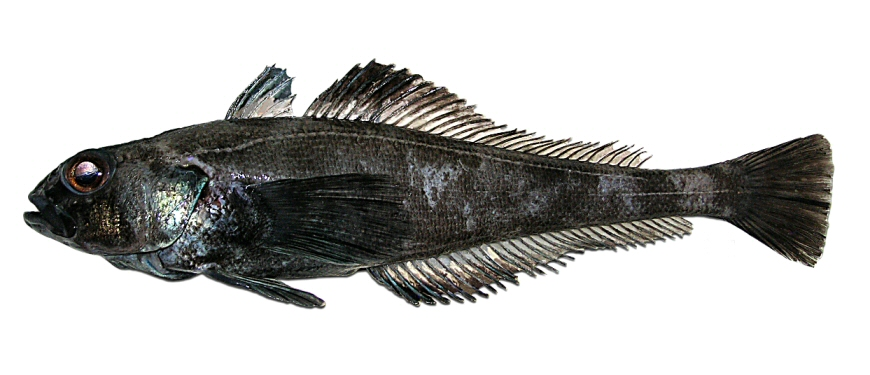
Scaly rockcod (T. loennbergii)

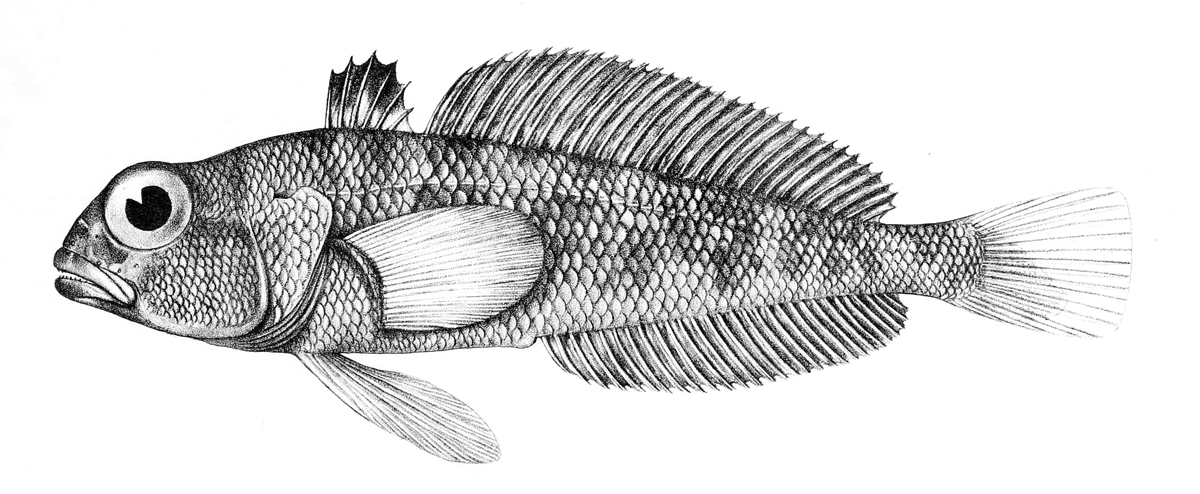
Sharp-spined notothenia (T. pennellii)

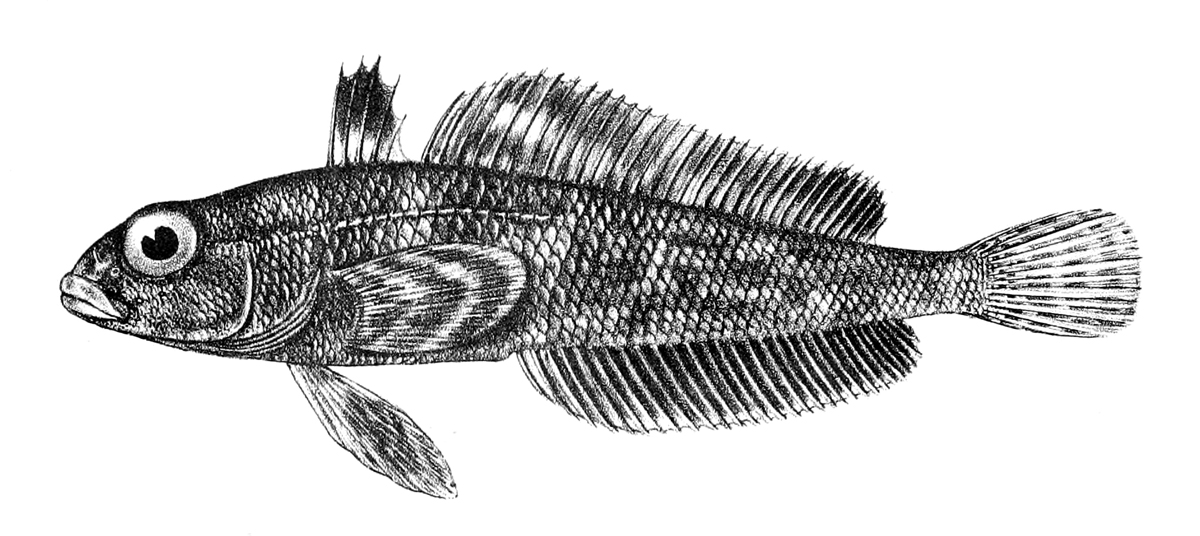
Crowned rockcod (T. scotti)

== Further references ==
- Biolib
