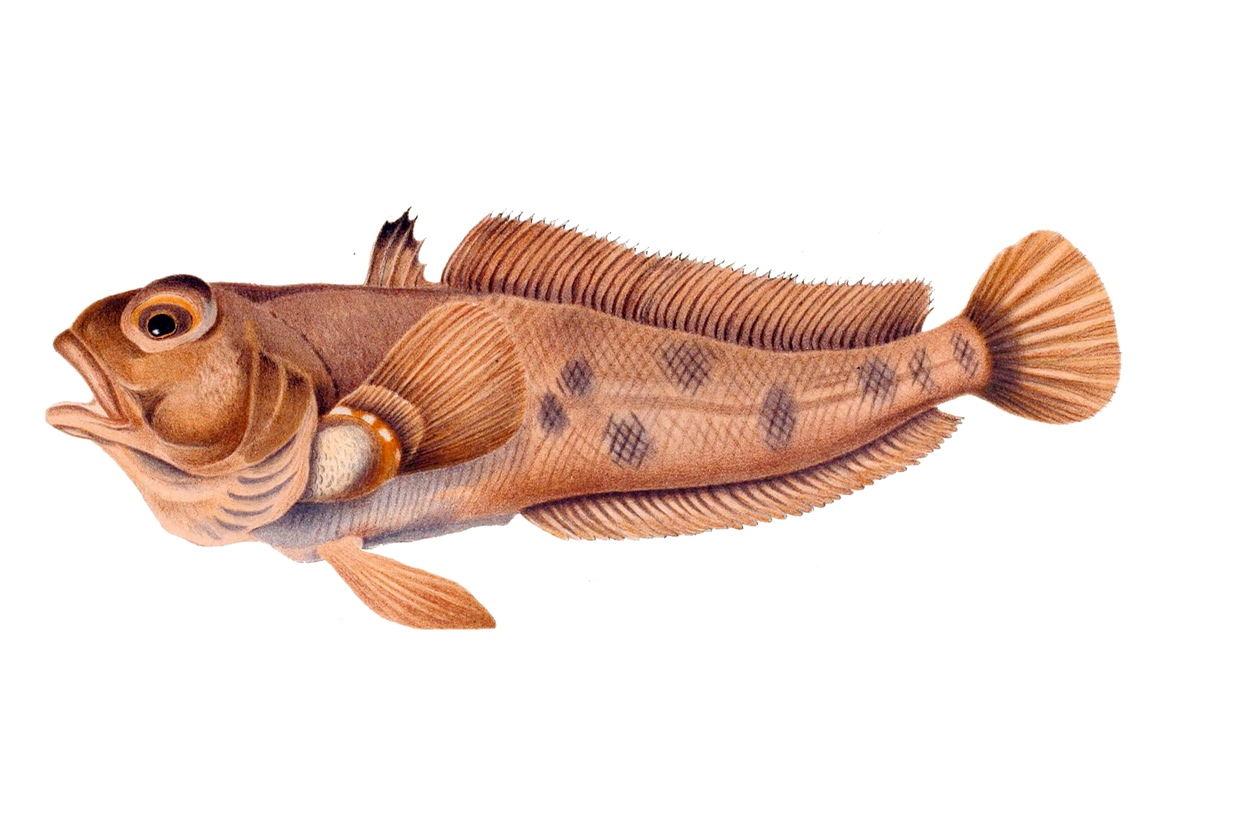

Scientific classification
- Kingdom: Animalia
- Phylum: Chordata
- Class: Actinopterygii
- Division: Teleostei
- Order: Perciformes
- Family: Nototheniidae
- Genus: Trematomus
- Species: T. bernacchii

Binomial name
- Trematomus bernacchii Boulenger, 1902

Synonyms
- Notothenia bernacchii (Boulenger, 1902); Pagothenia bernacchii (Boulenger, 1902); Pseudotrematomus bernacchii (Boulenger, 1902)

= Emerald rockcod =

Species of fish

The emerald rockcod (Trematomus bernacchii), also known as the emerald notothen, is a species of marine ray-finned fish belonging to the family Nototheniidae, the notothens or cod icefishes. It is native to the Southern Ocean

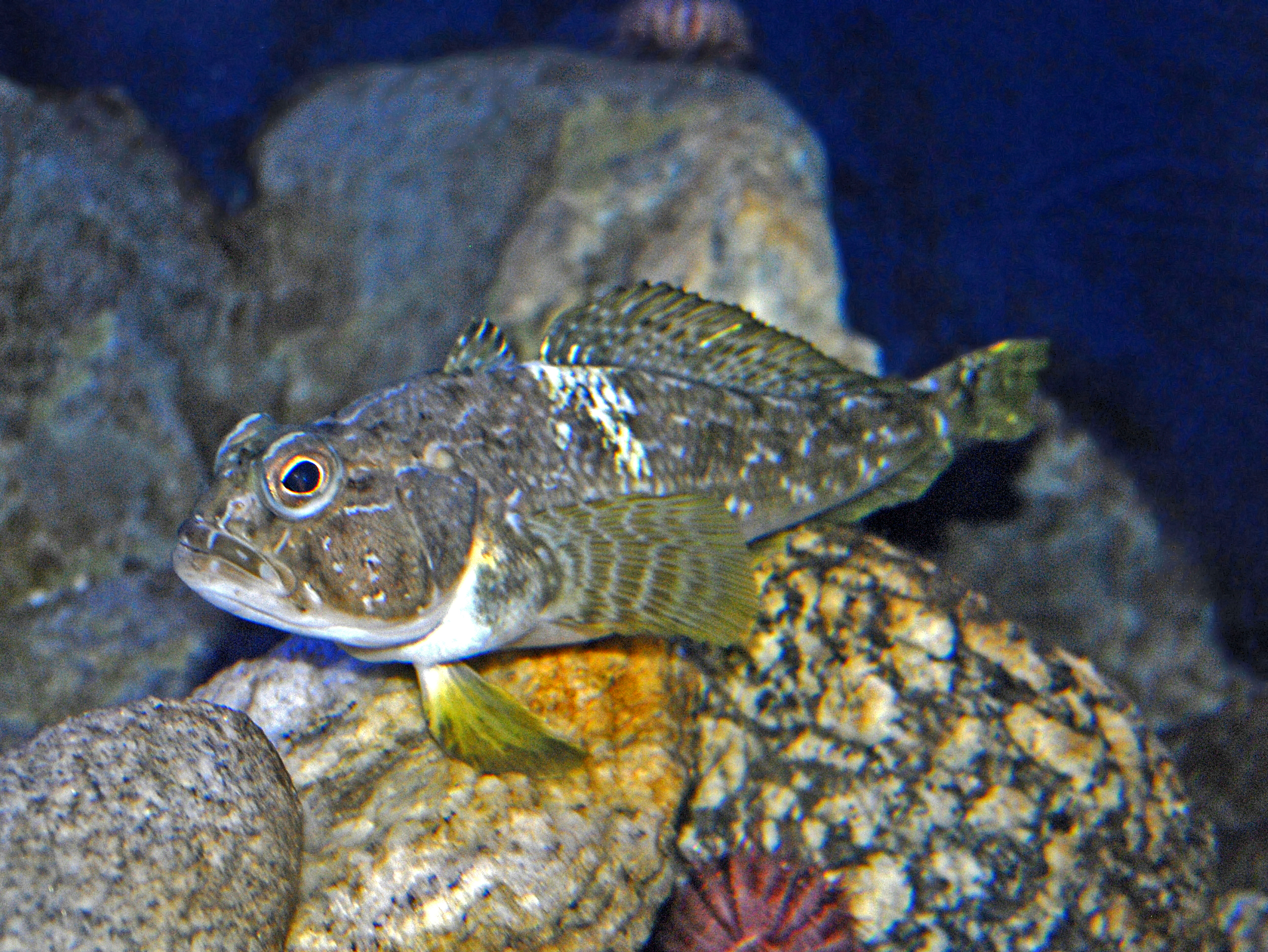
Emerald rockcod (Trematomus bernacchii)

== Taxonomy ==
The Emerald rockcod was first formally described in 1902 by the Belgian-born British ichthyologist George Albert Boulenger with the type localities given as Cape Adare in Antarctica at a depth of 5–8 fathoms and Duke of York Island at a depth of 3–4 fathoms. In 1982 the Russian ichthyologist Arkadii Vladimirovich Balushkin placed this species, and all the other species in its genus bar the type species, T. newnesi, in the new genus Pseudotrematomus but this has not been widely accepted.

== Etymology ==
The specific name honours the Australian physicist and astronomer Louis Bernacchi who carried out much of the exploring and collecting of specimens during the Southern Cross Expedition, on which the type was collected.

== Description ==
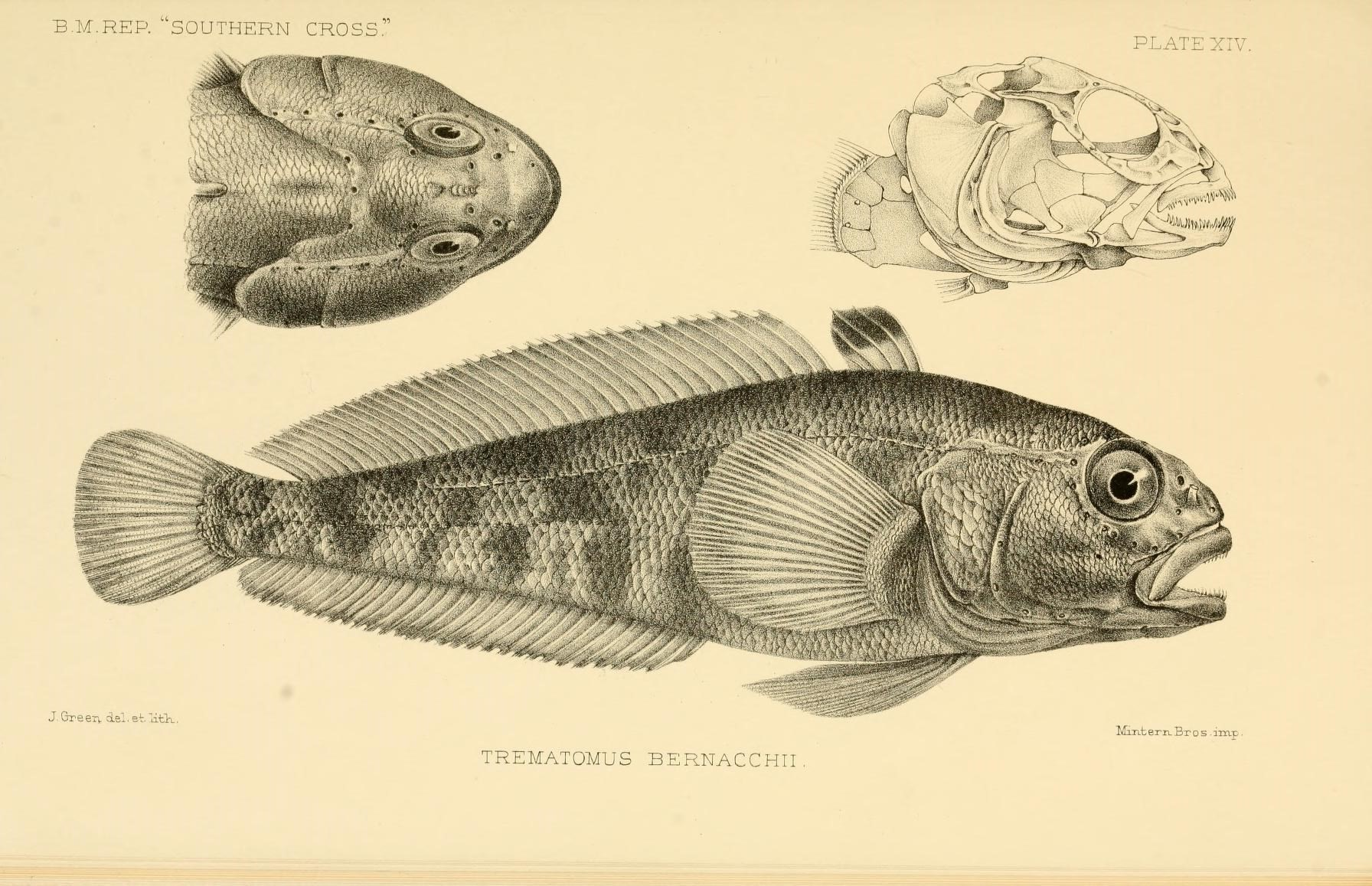
Lateral body diagram of Trematomus bernacchii, its head, and its skull

The emerald rockcod has a moderately compressed body and short snout. It is typically light brown or pinkish-brown, with darker coloring on the dorsal side. Its bodies are banded or spotted, either with dark brown or black. Its dorsal and anal fins are light brown, while its pectoral fins are dark brown with light spots. It has a series of three green spots around the base of the pectoral fins. Emerald rockcod have a short first dorsal fin with 4–6 spines and a long second dorsal fin with 34–39 soft rays that runs from about the center of the body to near the caudal fin. The emerald rockcod's anal fin contains 31–35 rays, running along a similar length as the second dorsal fin. Its caudal fin is rounded and contains 10–14 rays. Its pectoral fins are broad and fan-like, containing 22–26 rays. It has mainly ctenoid scales, with the exception of the underside, snout, and behind the jaw where it is bare. This species has two lateral lines, the upper one is scaleless while the lower one has 30–42 tubular scales. It has a large, oblique mouth with a maxilla that runs to below the center of the eye. Its lower jaw protrudes slightly and contains 1-2 bands of conical teeth. Males are between 149–256 mm in length and 29 to 209 g in weight, while females are between 156–333 mm in length and 39 to 609 g in weight.

Similar fish include the Bald Notothen (Pagothenia borchgrevinki) and the Stocky rockcod (Pagothenia phocae), who have two supraorbital pores (instead of one), the Striped rockcod (Trematomus hansoni), who have 27–33 pectoral rays, and the Bigeye Notothen (Trematomus tokarevi), who do not have green spots at their pectoral fin base.

== Distribution and habitat ==
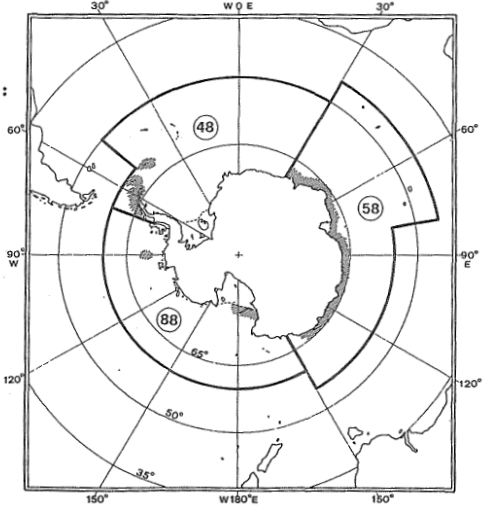
Distribution of Trematomus Bernacchii in the Southern Ocean. From Fischer and Hureau

This species is native to the Southern Ocean on the seafloor at depths from very shallow waters to 700 m (2,300 ft). It is commonly found on or around the continental shelf of the Weddell Sea, Davis Sea, Ross Sea, and Bellingshausen Sea. This species is one of the most abundant benthic species on Antarctic continental shelves. The environment they live in is extreme, with water temperatures between −1 and −1.86 °C. It prefers inshore bottom waters that are rocky and covered in macroalgae, which it feeds and lay eggs.

== Life history ==
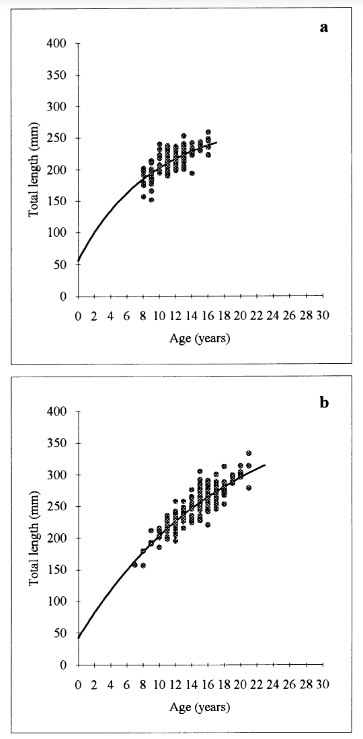
Growth curves of Trematomus Bernacchii. a is the curve for males. b is the curve for females. From La Mesa et al.

Emerald rockcod spawn from October to November off the Adelie Coast and December to January in McMurdo Sound. Like many other Antarctic fish, it grows slowly and reaches a relatively old age. Using its otoliths for reference, males attain an age of 8–16 years while females attain an age of 7-21. Additionally, females were younger than males in the same size class, meaning that females not only attain a larger size than males, but also grow faster. This species spawn for the first time between 5 and 6 years. Sexually mature females go through four stages:

1. A period of slow gonad growth after spawning.
2. A period of rapid gonad growth.
3. The spawning period.
4. A short period of gonadal inactivity.

This species lays clutches of 1012 to 4570 eggs, with egg diameters between 1.4 and 3.8 mm. It deposits its eggs on algae beds or in sponges. Compared to other Antarctic fish this species has relatively low fecundity. This could be due in part to a reproductive strategy, as Emerald rockcod are one of few species that have demonstrated parental care, with females found in egg-guarding positions within Rosella nuda sponges.

== Diet ==
Emerald rockcod are a generalized species, consuming various invertebrates, small fishes, and also are known to feed on some algae. While its prey is on a wide trophic spectrum, most often it is found to consume amphipods, infaunal and epifaunal polychaetes, and molluscs. Prey of secondary importance include isopods, pycnogonids, small fish, and fish eggs. Being opportunistic, this species will consume what is most common in their environment. This means that intraspecific competition is limited. This is demonstrated when analyzing the diets of Emerald rockcod in shallow and deep waters. In shallow water, foraging techniques make it the primary predator~~s~~ of the Antarctic scallop (Adamussium colbecki). In deeper waters, Antarctic scallop no longer appear, and this population instead feed on abundant infaunal or epifaunal polychaetes. In addition, it has been described with different feeder strategies in different areas of Antarctica. In the West Antarctic Peninsula, they have been described as ambush feeders, hiding among the environment and striking when prey are near. In the Ross Sea, they have been described as hunt and peck predators, actively seeking out unaware prey.

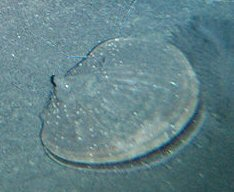
Antarctic scallop (Adamussium colbecki)

This species has relatively high jaw closing pressure, which assists them in durophagous feeding, especially the consumption of Antarctic scallop. Predation by Emerald rockcod has a significant impact on the population structure of Antarctic scallops. This species usually consumes medium-sized prey, as smaller juvenile scallops do not maximize the cost/benefits ratio and larger adult scallops are often too large for the average fish to handle. This creates a scallop population with larger percentages of large and small scallops. In addition, the medium sized scallops that this species usually consumes are often about to reach reproductive maturity, suggesting that Emerald rockcod are a major control in Antarctic scallop population growth.

== Physiological adaptations for cold ==
Unlike most organisms, the emerald rockcod does not show a typical heat shock response; for example, it does not upregulate the heat shock protein gene hsp70 when in warm temperatures. Instead, upregulation of hsp70 is more prominent when it is in its normal temperature environment. Although normally hsp70 is an inducible gene, this gene was found to be expressed at all times in emerald rockcod. A constitutive heat shock gene hsc71 showed the same pattern of expression, and so it was deduced that in the emerald rockcod hsp70 was also being expressed as a constitutive gene. Low temperatures in its Antarctic habitat may cause cellular stress that can denature the cellular proteins of these fish, making it necessary to express high constitutive levels of heat shock proteins.

This species and other species in the Trematomus genus have two antifreeze proteins (AFPs): antifreeze glycoproteins (AFGPs) and antifreeze potentiating proteins (AFPPs). These AFPs absorb to internal ice crystals that would inhibit growth and lower the freezing point of these species' blood to below the freezing point of the surrounding seawater (−1.9 °C). The blood's freezing point is variable, as the blood in lower latitude, warmer waters has a higher freezing point than those found at higher latitudes. High latitude, low freezing point fish have higher AFP activity than the lower latitude ones.

== Adaptations to changing oceans ==
Elevated seawater temperatures have been observed to affect the metabolism of Emerald rockcod at the organism level. Living in a rapidly warming extremist climate region, Antarctic fish are especially vulnerable to temperature changes. Upon acclimation to temperatures up to 4 °C over 9 weeks, this species was observed to have an 84% reduction in mass growth, even while having comparable food consumption to control groups at 0 °C. This is best explained by reduced food assimilation rates. Antarctic fish are especially vulnerable when juveniles, as the growth reduction will likely delay sexual maturity and fecundity. In elevated CO_{2} conditions, the juveniles of this species are especially robust. Common consequences of elevated CO_{2} in other fish species include hyperventilation, adjustments to physiology, adjustments to enzyme activity, cardiac failure, and circulatory system failure. Emerald rockcod juveniles exhibited none of these symptoms under laboratory conditions. However, when exposed to both elevated water temperatures and elevated CO_{2} levels, this species ability to acclimate to the warmer water was reduced, perhaps as an energy conservation strategy.

== Conservation ==
This species is not currently evaluated under IUCN or CITES.
