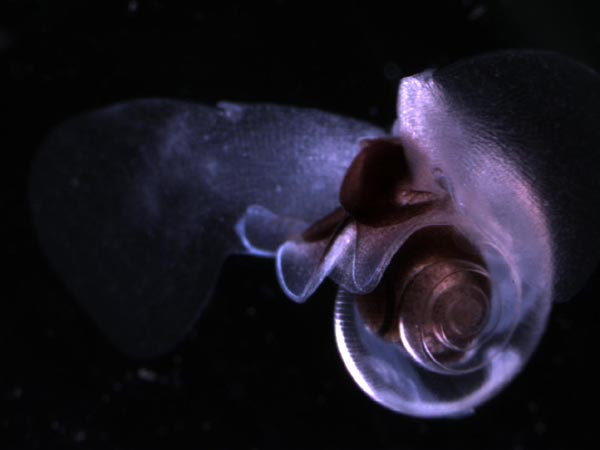
- Limacina helicina

Scientific classification
- Kingdom: Animalia
- Phylum: Mollusca
- Class: Gastropoda
- Clade: Euopisthobranchia
- Order: Pteropoda
- Superfamily: Limacinoidea
- Family: Limacinidae; Gray, 1840

Genera
- See text

Synonyms
- Spiratellidae

= Limacinidae =

Family of gastropods

The Limacinidae are a family of small sea snails, pteropods, pelagic marine gastropod mollusks in the clade Thecosomata (sea butterflies).

== Genera ==
Genera within the family Limacinidae include:

- Altaspiratella Korobkov, 1966 - synonym: Plotophysops Curry, 1982
  - † A. elongatoidea (Aldrich, 1887) - type species of the genus Altaspiratella
  - † A. bearnensis (Curry, 1982)
  - † A. multispira (Curry, 1982)
- Currylimacina Janssen, 2003
  - C. cossmanni (Curry, 1981) - type species of the genus
- Heliconoides d'Orbigny, 1835 - Heliconoides may be split into various separate genera.
  - † H. auriformis (Curry, 1982)
  - † H. daguini Cahuzac & Janssen, 2010
  - † H. hospes (Rolle, 1861)
  - (recent) H. inflatus (d'Orbigny, 1836) - type species of the genus = Limacina inflata (d'Orbigny, 1836)
  - † H. linneensis Janssen, 2008
  - † H. mercinensis (Watelet & Lefèvre, 1885)
  - † H. merlei Cahuzac & Janssen, 2010
  - † H. mermuysi Cahuzac & Janssen, 2010
  - † H. nemoris (Curry, 1965)
  - † H. paula (Curry, 1982)
  - † H. pyrenaica Cahuzac & Janssen, 2010
  - † H. sondaari Janssen, 2007
  - † H. tertiaria (Tate, 1887)
- Limacina Bosc, 1817 - type genus of the family Limacinidae
- Striolimacina Janssen, 1999
  - † S. andaensis Janssen, 2007
  - † S. imitans (Gabb, 1873) - type species of the genus Striolimacina
- Skaptotion Curry, 1965
- Thielea
  - (recent) T. procera Strebel, 1908 = helicoides (Jeffreys, 1877) - Thielea procera is the type species of the genus.
- new genus?
  - 'Limacina' adornata Hodgkinson, 1992

Genera brought into synonymy

- Embolus Jeffreys, 1869: synonym of Heliconoides d'Orbigny, 1835
- Heterofusus Fleming, 1823; synonym of Limacina Bosc, 1817
- Lornia Marwick, 1926; synonym of Limacina Bosc, 1817
- Munthea van der Spoel, 1967; synonym of Limacina Bosc, 1817
- † Plotophysops Curry, 1982; synonym of † Altaspiratella Korobkov, 1966
- Polloneria Sulliotti, 1888: synonym of Heliconoides d'Orbigny, 1835
- Protomedea O. G. Costa, 1861; synonym of Heliconoides d'Orbigny, 1835
- Scaea Philippi, 1844: synonym of Limacina Bosc, 1817
- Spiratella Blainville, 1817: synonym of Limacina Bosc, 1817
- Spirialis Eydoux & Souleyet, 1840: synonym of Limacina Bosc, 1817
- Thilea; synonym of Thielea Strebel, 1908
