= Fulmentum =

Scientific classification
- Kingdom: Animalia
- Phylum: Mollusca
- Class: Gastropoda
- Subclass: Caenogastropoda
- Order: Neogastropoda
- Family: Pseudolividae
- Genus: Fulmentum; P. Fischer, 1884

Synonyms
- Mariona G. B. Sowerby III, 1890; Sylvanocochlis Melvill, 1903

Genus of gastropods

Fulmentum is a genus of sea snails, marine gastropod mollusks in the family Pseudolividae.

This is a synonym of Pseudoliva Swainson, 1840

== Species ==
Species within the genus Fulmentum include:

- Fulmentum ancilla (Hanley, 1859): synonym of Pseudoliva ancilla Hanley, 1860
- Fulmentum sepimentum (Rang, 1832): synonym of Pseudoliva sepimentum (Rang, 1832)
