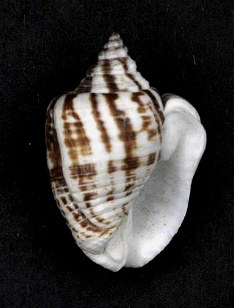
- Apertural view of a shell of Triumphis distorta (museum specimen at Naturalis Biodiversity Center)

Scientific classification
- Kingdom: Animalia
- Phylum: Mollusca
- Class: Gastropoda
- Subclass: Caenogastropoda
- Order: Neogastropoda
- Family: Pisaniidae
- Genus: Triumphis
- Species: T. distorta

Binomial name
- Triumphis distorta (Wood, 1828)

Synonyms
- Buccinum distortum W. Wood, 1828 (original combination); Columbella triumphalis Duclos, 1843

= Triumphis distorta =

Species of sea snail

Triumphis distorta is a species of sea snail, a marine gastropod mollusk in the family Pseudolividae.

== Description ==
The length of the shell varies between 35 mm and 52 mm.

The solid, ovate shell is inflated. It is covered with a fawn colored or reddish epidermis. The short spire is slightly obtuse and pointed at its summit. The whorls are six or seven in number, and very approximate; the four or five upper ones are conical, covered with subnodulous, longitudinal folds, which gradually become effaced, and disappear altogether upon the body whorl. This is partly smooth, pretty strongly furrowed at its base, larger than all the others, and separated by a broad and deep suture, forming a kind of scaffold, which renders it very round above. The other whorls are not very apparent. At their surface is seen, besides the longitudinal folds of which we have spoken, transverse striae which terminate in the body whorl. The aperture is ovate, oblong, narrow, sinuous, white within, and narrowed above by a double deposition of calcareous matter. The outer lip is striated internally, is thick above, and denticulated upon the remainder of its length. The columella, sinuous in its middle, is covered by the left lip, which is pretty thick, and partially conceals at its base a grooved columellar callosity. The coloring of this shell is whitish, marked with brown or fawn colored spots or bands.

== Distribution ==
This species occurs in the Pacific Ocean between El Salvador and Peru.
