= Echo Bank =

Seamount in the Atlantic Ocean

- Location within North Atlantic
- Summit depth: 255 m (837 ft)

Location
- Location: North Atlantic
- Group: Canary Islands Seamount Province
- Coordinates: 25.40°N 19.44°W

Geology
- Volcanic arc/chain: Sahara Seamounts

Echo Bank (also known as Endeavour Bank) is an underwater mountain, part of the Canary Islands Seamount Province and located southwest of the Canary Islands. Of uncertain geologic origin, it is part of a larger cluster of submarine mountains and rises to a depth of 255 metres (837 ft) below sea level. It has a flat top, indicating that it formerly might have emerged from the sea.

== Name ==
The etymology of "Echo Bank" is unknown but it is also known as Endeavour Bank and the name "Echo Bank" might refer to a submarine feature discovered in 1925-1927 and so named after its reflective crest. "Echo Bank" is also the name of an unconfirmed seamount south of the Sargasso Sea.

== Geography and geomorphology ==
=== Regional ===
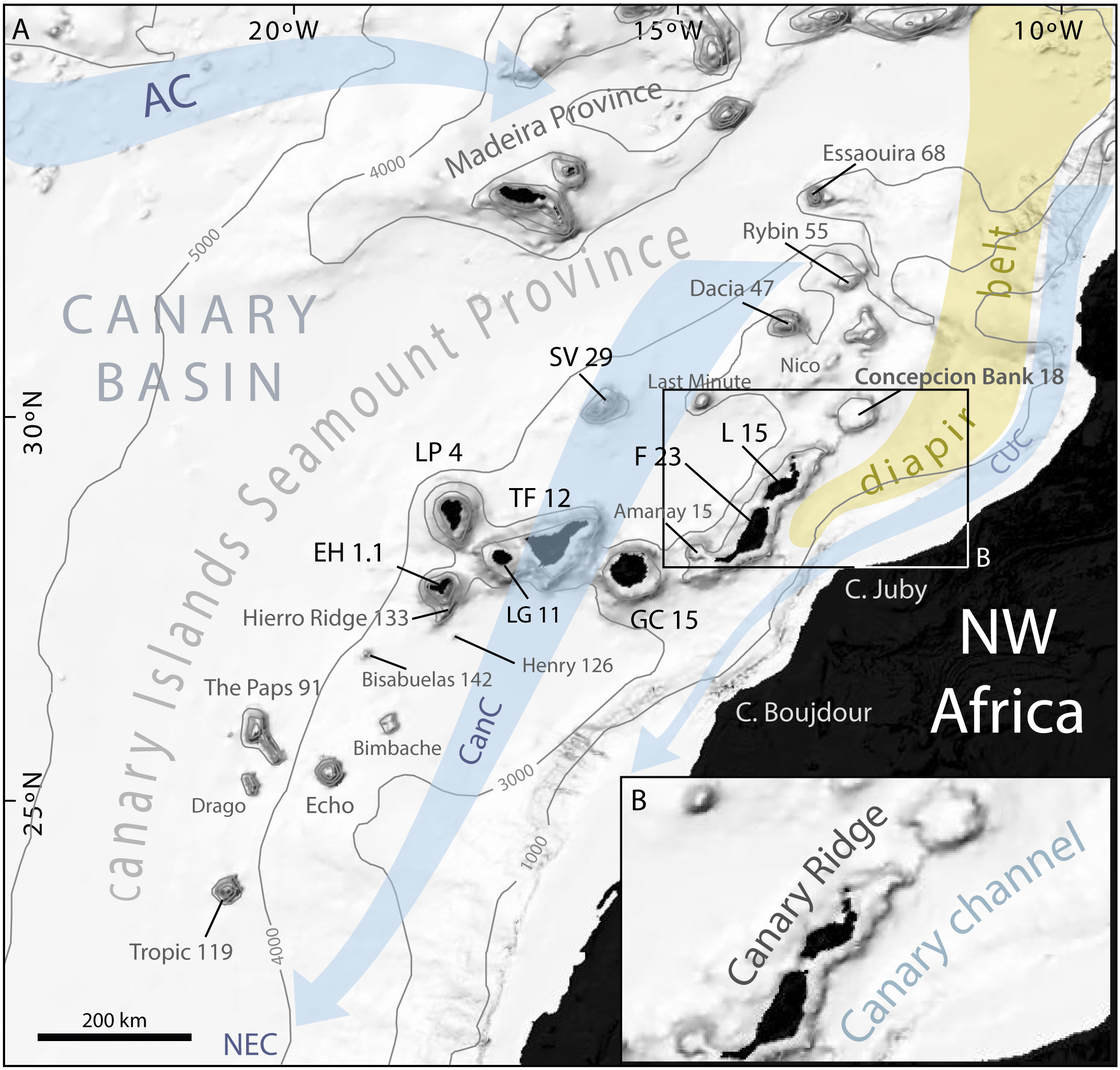
Map of the CISP (Rivera et al., 2016)

Echo Bank is part of the Canary Islands Seamount Province (CISP), which reaches from north of Lanzarote in the Canary Islands to southwest of the archipelago. This province aside from Echo Bank includes Tropic Seamount, The Paps Seamount, Ico Seamount and Drago Seamount but also Essaouira Seamount north of Lanzarote. Especially the southern among these underwater mountains are poorly studied; together with the Canary Islands proper they form an important volcanic province in the Atlantic Ocean. Aside from the seamounts, submarine canyons and large debris flows occur in the region such as the Sahara Slide which has run around Echo Bank.

=== Local ===
Echo Bank rises from the continental slope to a depth of about 300 metres (980 ft) below sea level, making it the shallowest seamount in the region. It has a almost circular maximally 16 kilometres (9.9 mi) wide flat top like a guyot at a depth of 350 metres (1,150 ft). There are small depressions on the topi. Volcanic cones which reach depths of 255 metres (837 ft) cluster in the central summit platform. Around the summit lie terraces and scarps, with the terraces particularly pronounced on the eastern side while the western side has only two. This may reflect a slight tilt of the seamount. The slopes of the seamount are steep and cut by curved slide scars and gullies which both reach lengths of 12–13 kilometres (7.5–8.1 mi). Echo Bank is 40 by 34 kilometres (25 mi × 21 mi) wide with a round shape and a 20 kilometres (12 mi) long ridge to the northwest and rests on a seafloor with a minimum depth of 3,700 metres (12,100 ft).

Northwest of Echo Bank lies first at 90 kilometres (56 mi) distance The Paps Seamount and after a group of submarine hills comes Ico Seamount, while southwest lies Drago Seamount and south-southwest lies Tropic Seamount 200 kilometres (120 mi) away. The San Borondón ridge connects the two seamounts. Northeast from Echo Bank lies first Hierro Seamount and then the island of El Hierro.

== Geology ==
The geological origin of the Canary Islands Seamounts are unclear, with various hotspot processes as well as crustal and mantle phenomena proposed. Volcanic activity at Echo and Tropic seamounts was probably focused and generated a circular volcanic structure, while at Drago and The Paps it was controlled by lineaments and thus formed elongated edifices.

=== Composition ===
Dredging at Echo Bank has yielded basaltic lapillistones, carbonates, coral debris, intermediate volcanic rocks, limestone of hemipelagic origin, manganese crusts, sandstone of volcanic and calcarenite origin and vesicular basalt. The volcanic rocks at the Canary Islands seamounts like those of the Canary Islands are classified as alkalic; the basaltic rocks contain clinopyroxene while the rare intermediary volcanic rocks contain amphibole.

Dredged samples of the ferromanganese crusts consist mainly of goethite and manganese dioxide and minor amounts of calcite, phyllosilicate and quartz. The ferromanganese deposits which occur on the Canary Islands Seamounts including at Echo Bank reach thicknesses of 20 centimetres (7.9 in) and are rich in cobalt and other elements of industrial significance; thus such submarine deposits have been considered to be targets for future mining efforts.

== Environment ==
A number of separate water masses surround Echo Bank, which originate from regions such as the North Atlantic, the South Atlantic and Antarctica and are stacked over each other. In general, the region is under the influence of the nutrient-poor waters of the subtropical gyre and the upwelling regions off northwestern Africa.

Bottom net trawlings of Echo Bank have revealed remarkable findings such as a rich decapod fauna. African cuttlefish, the barnacle Poecilasma aurantia, the common cuttlefish, the elegant cuttlefish and the giant African cuttlefish occur at Echo Bank; the giant African cuttlefish is the most commercially important cuttlefish in the region. In addition, the bobtail squids Rossia and Sepiola and the ram's horn squid have been found at Echo Bank. Shoals of fish were frequently observed on the seamount. In 1960–1970, snapper fisheries at Echo Bank were replaced by cephalopod fisheries.

== Geologic history ==
An age of 72 million years has been established for Echo Bank. The flat top of Echo Bank has been interpreted as having formed during subaerial erosion, implying that the seamount was once an island although the evidence for such is less clear than at Tropic Seamount and alternative explanations for the flat summit exist. Echo Bank is currently undergoing sedimentation and it appears to be volcanically inactive. There is evidence of recent landsliding, however, and cone-shaped topographic anomalies could indicate recent volcanism. One of these landslides may have occurred between 339,000 and 869,000 years ago.
