= Canary Islands Seamount Province =

Geographic region of the Canary Islands

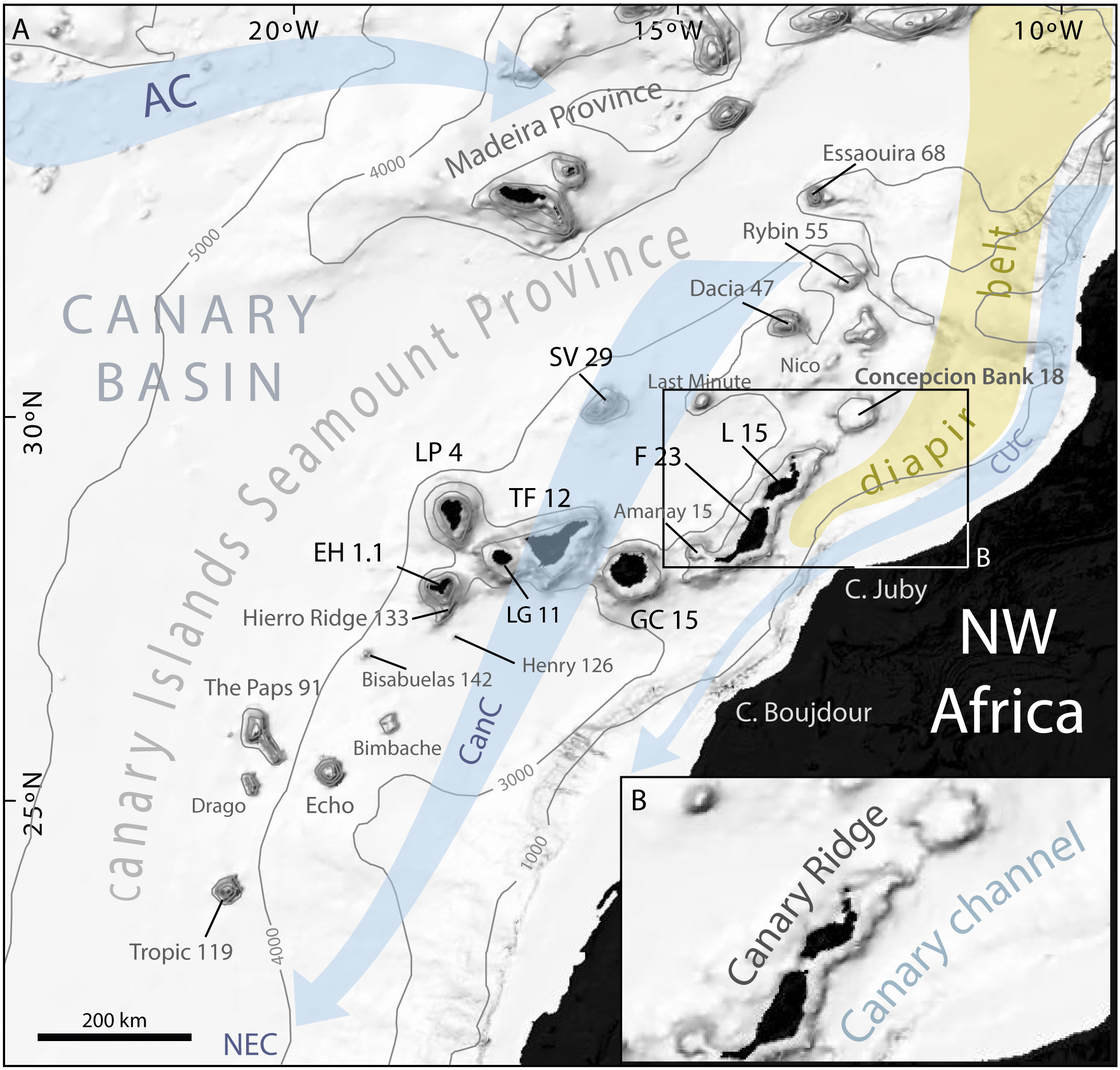
Map of the CISP (Rivera et al, 2016)

The Canary Islands Seamount Province (CISP) is located in the Atlantic Ocean between 23º and 33º north. It comprises the seven major islands of the Canary Islands archipelago, the two islets of the Savage Islands and 16 seamounts scattered along an area of 540,000 km^{2} parallel to the northwestern coastline of the African Continent. Besides its geographical distribution, the components of the province share a series of geochemical similarities.

Three different alignments have been described within the CISP:

- A SW-NE stretch going from the Tropic Seamount to the westernmost point of the Canarian archipelago.
- A central NNW-ESE stretch from the Canarian islands of La Palma and El Hierro to the island of Fuerteventura (400 km long).
- The so-called Canary Ridge, initially following SW-NE direction from Fuerteventura to the Concepción Bank, and from there following a S-N direction from the Concepción Bank to the Essaouira Seamount.

== Seamounts ==
- Amanay Seamount
- Bimbache Seamount
- Bisabuelas Seamount
- Concepción Bank
- Dacia Seamount
- Drago Seamount
- Echo Seamount
- Essaouira Seamount
- Henry Seamount
- Last Minute Seamount
- Nico Seamount
- Rybin Seamount
- The Paps
- Tropic Seamount

== See also ==
- Geology of the Canary Islands
- Canary hotspot

== Bibliography ==
- Rivera, J; Canals, M; Lastras, G; Hermida, N; Amblas, D; Arrese, B (2016). "Morphometry of Concepcion Bank: Evidence of Geological and Biological Processes on a Large Volcanic Seamount of the Canary Islands Seamount Province". PLoS ONE. 11 (5) e0156337. Bibcode:2016PLoSO..1156337R. doi:10.1371/journal.pone.0156337. PMC 4886973. PMID 27243626.
