= Pseudoliva crassa =

Scientific classification
- Kingdom: Animalia
- Phylum: Mollusca
- Class: Gastropoda
- Subclass: Caenogastropoda
- Order: Neogastropoda
- Family: Pseudolividae
- Genus: Pseudoliva
- Species: P. crassa

Binomial name
- Pseudoliva crassa (Gmelin, 1791)

Synonyms
- Buccinum crassum Gmelin, 1791; Buccinum plumbeum Dillwyn, 1817; Pseudoliva plumbea (Dillwyn, 1817); Pseudoliva striatula A. Adams, 1854

Species of gastropod

Pseudoliva crassa is a species of sea snail, a marine gastropod mollusk in the family Pseudolividae.

== Description ==
Shell size 49 mm.
