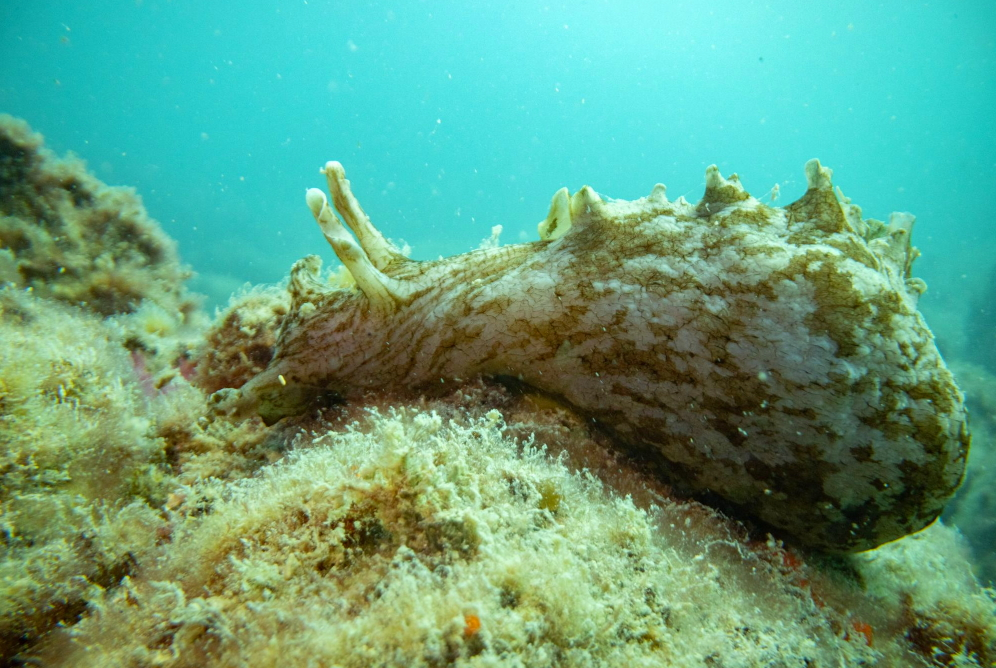
- Aplysia keraudrenii (live specimen)

Scientific classification
- Kingdom: Animalia
- Phylum: Mollusca
- Class: Gastropoda
- Order: Aplysiida
- Superfamily: Aplysioidea
- Family: Aplysiidae
- Genus: Aplysia
- Species: A. keraudrenii

Binomial name
- Aplysia keraudrenii Rang, 1828

= Aplysia keraudrenii =

Species of gastropod

Aplysia keraudrenii, common name the Keraudren aplysia, is a species of sea hare or sea slug, a marine opisthobranch gastropod mollusk in the family Aplysiidae.

== Taxonomy ==
This species is sometimes known as keraudreni, which is an unjustified emendation of Aplysia keraudrenii.

== Distribution ==
This sea hare occurs in the Southwest Pacific Ocean and Eastern Australia; of New Zealand (North Island and Stewart Island)

== Description ==
The length of the species attains 25 cm.

(Original description in French) The animal is oblong, notably convex, with a somewhat shortened anterior and a pointed posterior. Its lobes are large, the operculum vast, and the siphon elongated and longitudinally open. The mantle is smooth, greenish-brown, and adorned with large black spots.

The shell is oval, elongated, and significantly narrowed posteriorly. It features a long, shallow indentation, a thick and recurved apex, and is yellowish-brown dorsally and white ventrally.

Detailed Description: Aplysia keraudrenii is highly elevated, oblong in form, and not particularly elongated anteriorly. Its posterior terminates in a point. The very large lobes are highly adapted for locomotion, functioning as fins, and they unite behind the operculum. The operculum itself is vast and oblong, with its central tube being more distinct than in many other species. The siphon, formed by a large fold, is long and widely open along its entire length. The anterior tentacles are broad and undulated along their edges, while the posterior tentacles are conical and lack any distinctive features. The mantle of this striking species is smooth and displays a dark greenish hue, embellished with numerous large, highly irregular, and closely spaced black spots. The foot is broad, oblong, and calloused.

Shell Characteristics: The shell is remarkable for its size and is less concave compared to other species. It is oval, pointed, and significantly narrowed posteriorly. Its indentation is lateral, long, and only slightly arched, occupying approximately half of the shell's total length. The apex is quite thick, recurved, and triangular. The ventral surface, covered by a rather thick calcareous layer, appears white, whereas the dorsal surface is yellowish-tan.

(Description by G.B. Sowerby II) The shell is rather solid and shaped like a Dolabella. It is elevated and tumid (swollen) in an arch posteriorly near the margin, while appearing rather flat anteriorly. Internally, it is white and testaceous (shelly); externally, it is yellowish, horny, and concentrically wrinkled towards the apex. The apex is elevated and slightly calloused. The upper margin is deeply excavated and acuminated (pointed) at its extremity. The lower margin is slightly excavated.
