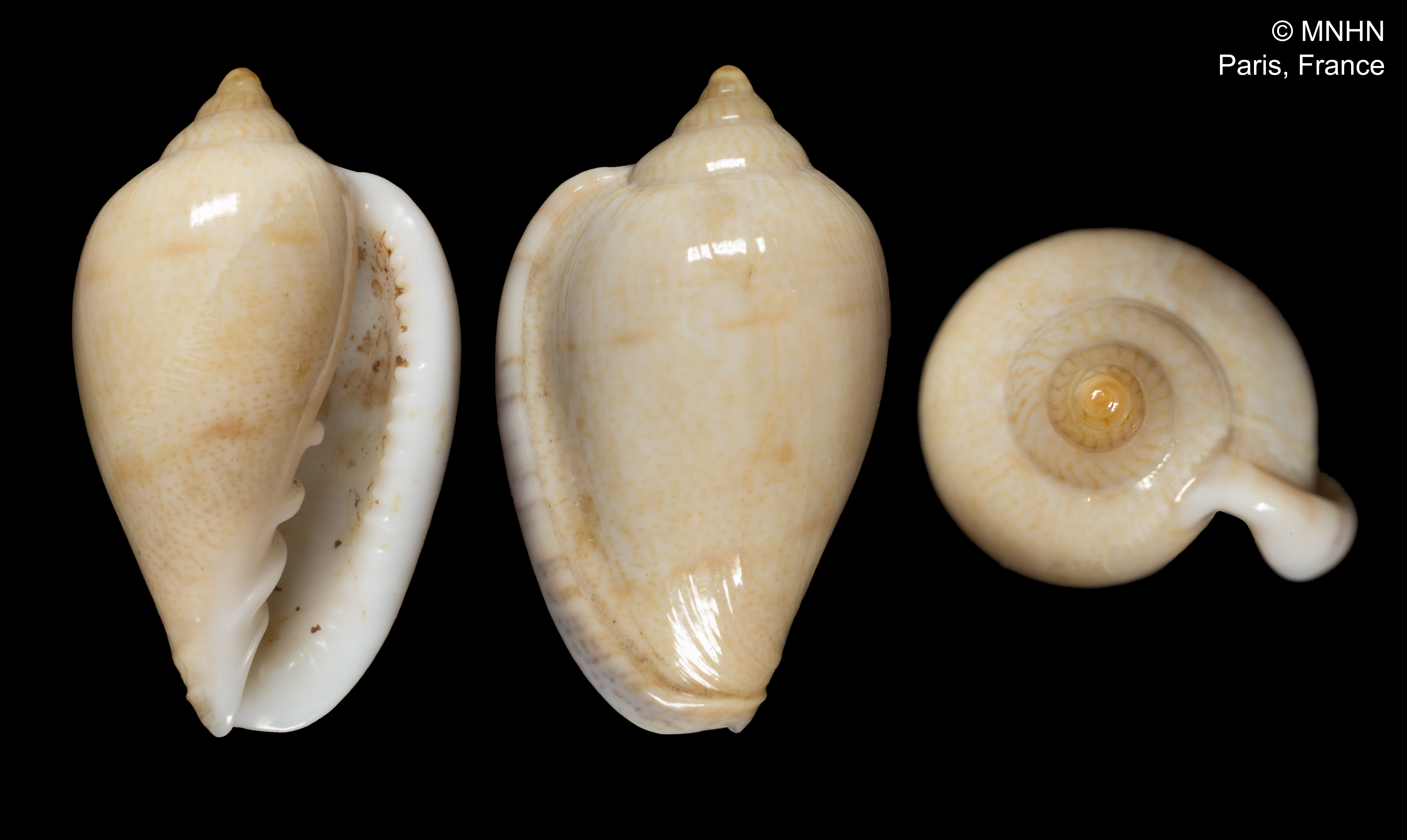
- Shell of Marginella helmatina (syntype at MNHN, Paris)

Scientific classification
- Kingdom: Animalia
- Phylum: Mollusca
- Class: Gastropoda
- Subclass: Caenogastropoda
- Order: Neogastropoda
- Family: Marginellidae
- Subfamily: Marginellinae
- Genus: Marginella
- Species: M. helmatina

Binomial name
- Marginella helmatina (Rang, 1829)

Synonyms
- Marginella (Ovulamarginella) helmatina Rang, 1832· accepted, alternate representation

= Marginella helmatina =

Species of gastropod

Marginella helmatina is a species of sea snail, a marine gastropod mollusk in the family Marginellidae, the margin snails.

Subspecies

- Marginella helmatina cumingiana Petit de la Saussaye, 1841

== Description ==
The length of the shell attains 20 mm.

== Distribution ==
This marine species occurs off Gabon and São Tomé and Príncipe.
