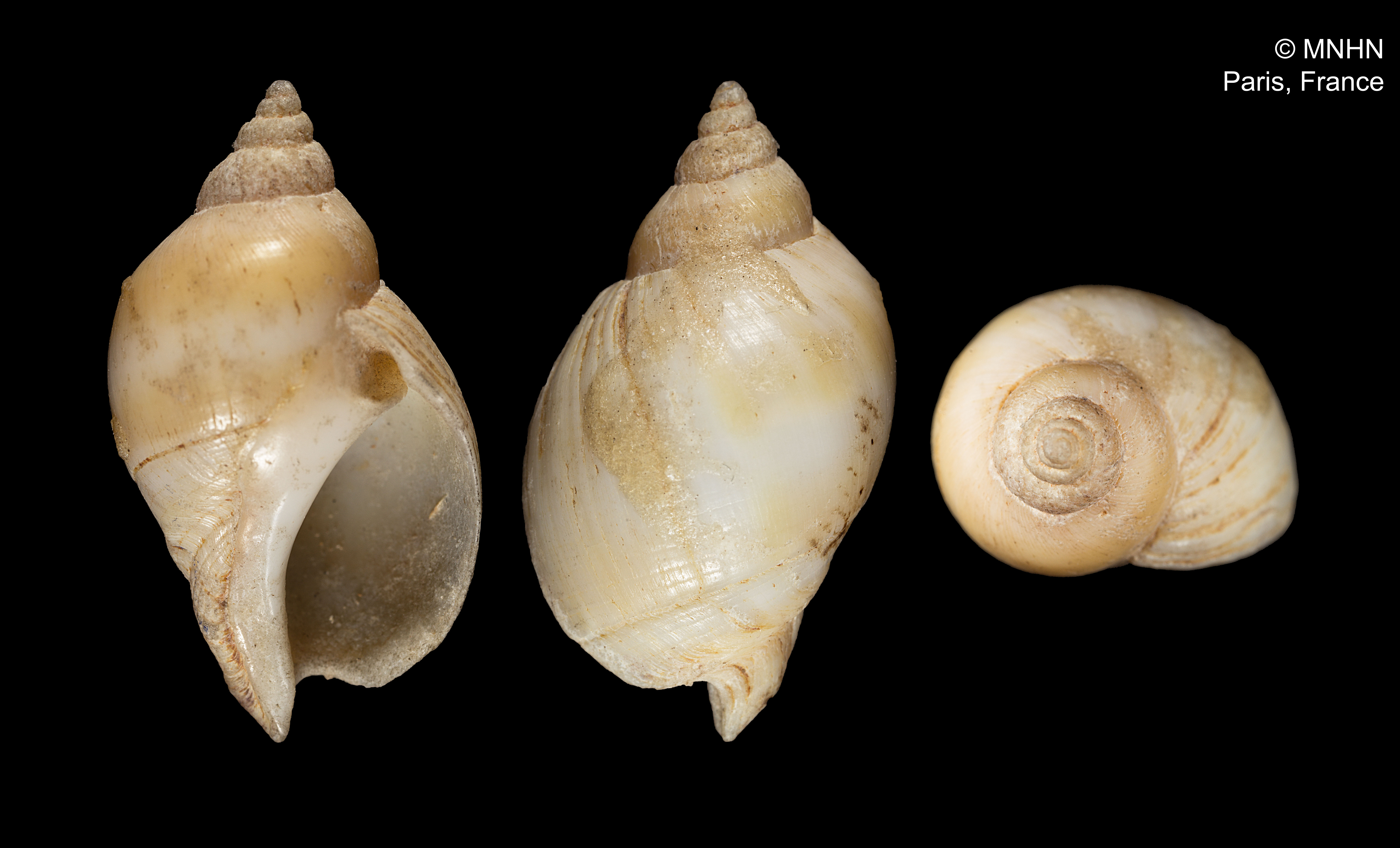
- Shell of Pseudoliva sepimentum (syntype at MNHN, Paris)

Scientific classification
- Kingdom: Animalia
- Phylum: Mollusca
- Class: Gastropoda
- Subclass: Caenogastropoda
- Order: Neogastropoda
- Family: Pseudolividae
- Genus: Pseudoliva
- Species: P. sepimentum

Binomial name
- Pseudoliva sepimentum (Rang, 1832)

Synonyms
- Buccinum sepimentum Rang, 1832; Fulmentum sepimentum (Rang, 1832)

= Pseudoliva sepimentum =

Species of gastropod

Pseudoliva sepimentum is a species of sea snail, a marine gastropod mollusk in the family Pseudolividae.

== Description ==
The size of the shell varies between 11 mm and 22 mm.

The ovate, conical shell is slightly ventricose, attenuated at summit and base, pretty solid and nearly smooth. Its ground color is bluish ash, ornamented with a deeper band upon each whorl, and upon the lowest, with two others, distant, and more obvious. The epidermis is greenish. The pointed spire is composed of five or six distinct, convex whorls. The body whorl is much larger than all the others together, presenting at the base a pretty deep decurrent suture. The aperture is whitish, ovate, elongated, and terminates at the base by a very oblique emargination, and above by a canal formed by the prolongation, upon the columella, of a callosity which becomes there a thin sharp plate. This plate presents the appearance of a partition extending towards the left lip; the outer lip is much elongated, thin and sharp. The columella is arcuated, covered by a callosity which extends a little upon the body of the shell. From the middle arises a ridge which descends obliquely nearly to the base of the outer lip, where it terminates within by a small elevation.

== Distribution ==
This marine species occurs off West Africa and Angola.
