= Luizia =

Scientific classification
- Kingdom: Animalia
- Phylum: Mollusca
- Class: Gastropoda
- Subclass: Caenogastropoda
- Order: Neogastropoda
- Family: Pseudolividae
- Genus: Luizia; Douvillé, 1933

Genus of gastropods

Luizia is a monospecific genus of sea snails, marine gastropod mollusks in the family Pseudolividae.

== Species ==
Species within the genus Luizia include:

- Luizia zebrina (A. Adams, 1855)
