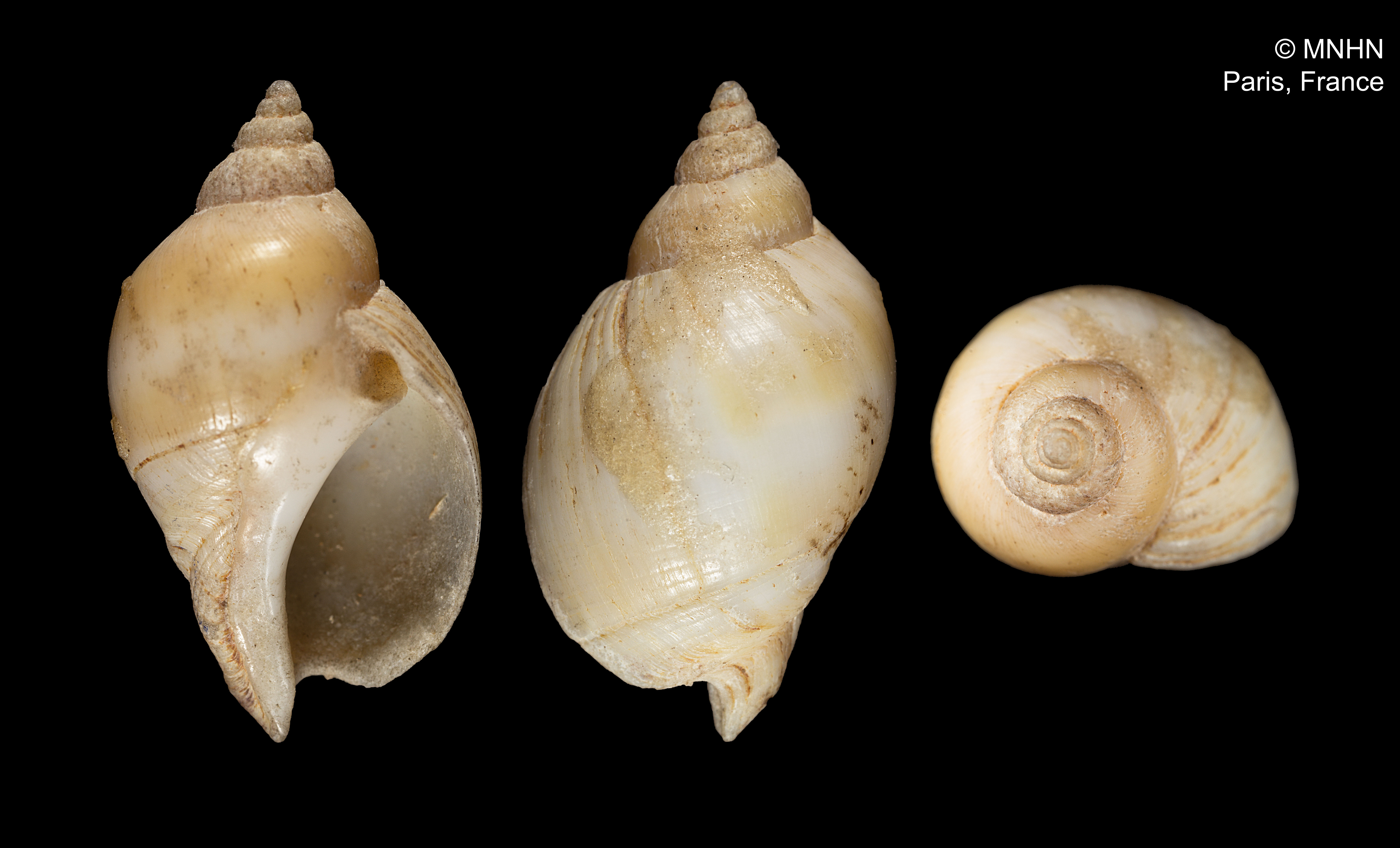
- Shell of Pseudoliva sepimentum

Scientific classification
- Kingdom: Animalia
- Phylum: Mollusca
- Class: Gastropoda
- Subclass: Caenogastropoda
- Order: Neogastropoda
- Superfamily: Olivoidea
- Family: Pseudolividae
- Genus: Pseudoliva; Swainson, 1840

Type species
- Buccinum plumbeum Dillwyn, 1817

Synonyms
- Fulmentum P. Fischer, 1884; Mariona G. B. Sowerby III, 1890; Pseudoliva (Mariona) G. B. Sowerby III, 1890 ·; Sylvanocochlis Melvill, 1903 (junior objective synonym of Mariona)

= Pseudoliva =

Pseudoliva Temporal range: Lower Paleocene-Holocene

Genus of gastropods

Pseudoliva is a genus of sea snails, marine gastropod mollusks in the family Pseudolividae.

Pseudoliva is the type genus of that family.

== Description ==
The ovate shell is solid and subglobose. The spire is very short. The suture is slightly channelled. The whorls are tumid round the upper part. The aperture is oval. The siphonal canal is very short. The inner lip is arcuated, with a callosity at the hind part. The outer lip is thin, furnished at the fore part with a small tooth or callosity.

== Species ==
Species within the genus Pseudoliva include:

- Pseudoliva aikeni D. Monsecour & K. Monsecour, 2023
- Pseudoliva ancilla Hanley, 1860
- † Pseudoliva binodosa Traub, 1938
- † Pseudoliva bocaserpentis Maury, 1912
- Pseudoliva crassa (Gmelin, 1791)
- † Pseudoliva dudariensis (Strausz, 1966)
- † Pseudoliva fissurata (Deshayes, 1835)
- † Pseudoliva globosa Garvie, 2013
- † Pseudoliva laudunensis (Defrance, 1826)
- † Pseudoliva mutabilis H. Woods, 1922
- † Pseudoliva obtusa (Deshayes, 1835)
- † Pseudoliva ostrarupis G. D. Harris, 1895
- † Pseudoliva santander Gardner, 1945
- † Pseudoliva scalina Heilprin, 1881
- Pseudoliva sepimentum (Rang, 1832)
- † Pseudoliva tuberculifera Conrad, 1860

Synonyms

- † Pseudoliva antiqua Vincent, 1878: synonym of † Fusulculus antiquus (Vincent, 1878) (original combination)
- † Pseudoliva chavani Glibert, 1973: synonym of † Fusulculus multinodulosus (Vermeij, 1998) (invalid: junior homonym of Pseudoliva chavani Tessier, 1952; Sulcobuccinum multinodulosum is a replacement name)
- Pseudoliva kellettii A. Adams, 1855: synonym of Macron aethiops (Reeve, 1847)
- † Pseudoliva koeneni Ravn, 1939: synonym of † Fusulculus koeneni (Ravn, 1939) (original combination)
- Pseudoliva livida A. Adams, 1855: synonym of Macron lividus (A. Adams, 1855)
- † Pseudoliva monilis Olsson, 1928: synonym of † Sulcoliva monilis (Olsson, 1928) (original combination)
- Pseudoliva plumbea Chemnitz: synonym of Pseudoliva crassa (Gmelin, 1791)
- † Pseudoliva pusilla von Koenen, 1885: synonym of † Fusulculus koeneni (Ravn, 1939) (invalid: secondary junior homonym of Fusulculus pusillus)
- † Pseudoliva rosenkrantzi Traub, 1979: synonym of † Fusulculus rosenkrantzi (Traub, 1979) (original combination)
- Pseudoliva stereoglypta G. B. Sowerby III, 1882: synonym of Macron wrightii H. Adams, 1865
- Pseudoliva striatula A. Adams, 1855: synonym of Pseudoliva crassa (Gmelin, 1791)
- Pseudoliva zebrina Adams, 1855: synonym of Luizia zebrina (A. Adams, 1855)
