= Concepción Bank =

Seamount in the Atlantic Ocean

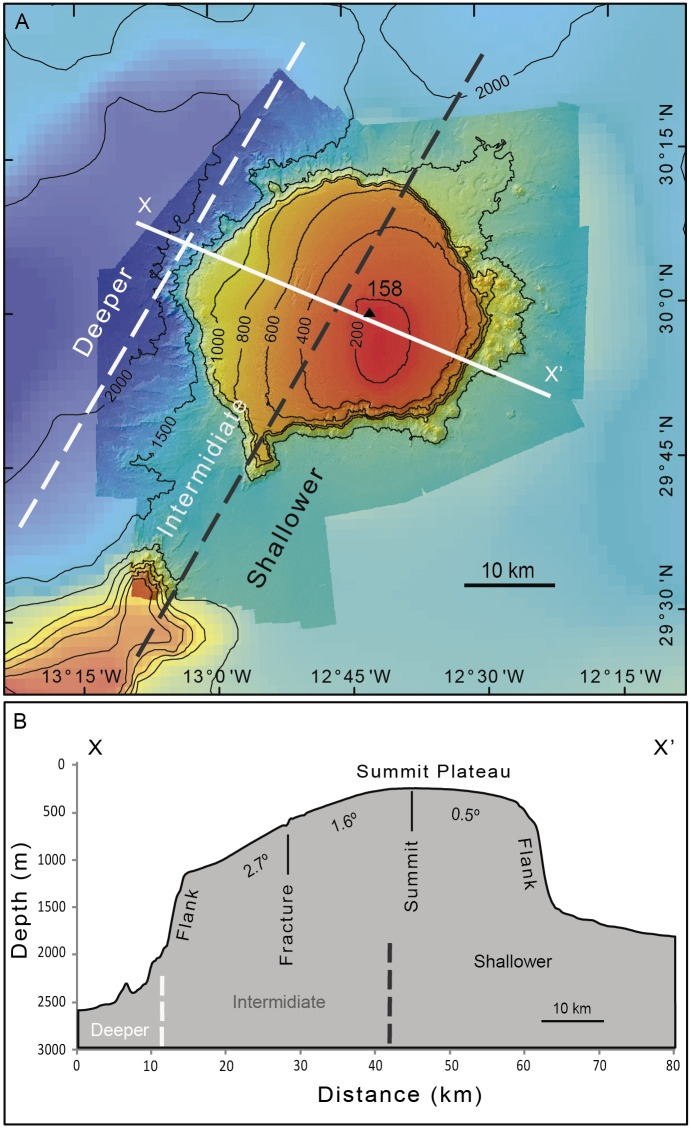
- Bathymetry and surrounding sea bed (Rivera et al, 2016)

Location
- Location: North Atlantic
- Group: Canary Islands Seamount Province

The Concepción Bank (Spanish: Banco Concepción) is a seamount located in the Atlantic Ocean, part of the Canary Islands Seamount Province (CISP).

Located 90 km (56 mi) to the North-East of the Canarian Island of Lanzarote, it is the largest (in terms of surface) seamount of the CISP. Rising 2,433 m (7,982 ft) m over the sea bed, it reaches a minimum depth of 158 m (518 ft) m below sea level.

== Bibliography ==
- Rivera, J; Canals, M; Lastras, G; Hermida, N; Amblas, D; Arrese, B (2016). "Morphometry of Concepcion Bank: Evidence of Geological and Biological Processes on a Large Volcanic Seamount of the Canary Islands Seamount Province". PLoS ONE. 11 (5) e0156337. doi:10.1371/journal.pone.0156337. PMC 4886973. PMID 27243626.
