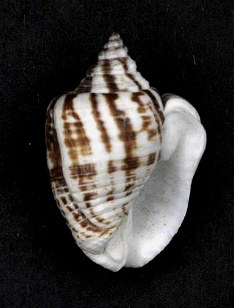
- Shell of Triumphis distorta

Scientific classification
- Kingdom: Animalia
- Phylum: Mollusca
- Class: Gastropoda
- Subclass: Caenogastropoda
- Order: Neogastropoda
- Family: Triumphidae
- Genus: Triumphis; Gray, 1857

Type species
- Buccinum distortum W. Wood, 1828

Synonyms
- Cantharus (Triumphis) J. E. Gray, 1857 superseded rank; Triumphis (Triumphis) J. E. Gray, 1857 superseded rank

= Triumphis =

Genus of gastropods

Triumphis is a genus of sea snails, marine gastropod mollusks in the monotypic family Triumphidae, with historically controversial affinities but now considered a buccinoid closely related to Pisaniidae.

It is found in the tropical eastern Pacific.

== Classification ==
Triumphis was historically classified as a member of Buccinidae, but in 1998, Geerat J. Vermeij assigned it to Pseudolividae, However, in 2017, Kantor and colleagues, in their revision of Olivoidea, tentatively assigned Triumphis to Nassariidae, and in 2024, a phylogenetic analysis by Fedosov and colleagues recovered Triumphis as a member of Buccinoidea, the sister taxon to Pisania, the only member of Pisaniidae included in their analysis. As of December 2024, WoRMS recognizes Triumphis as a member of Pisaniidae; it had previously been included in Pseudolividae. In 2026, Fedosov and colleagues established a new monotypic family, Triumphidae, for the genus.

== Characteristics ==
(original description) The shell is ovate, and it is covered with a thick, coarse, velvety periostracum that hides its true color. The spire is conic, and the whorls are convex. The outer whorls are larger and irregularly cover the rest of the shell.

The aperture is ovate. The inner lip is smooth. The siphonal canal is very short and recurved. The denticles number three; the central one is three-toothed; the lateral ones are large, hamate (hook-shaped), and three-toothed, with the outer tooth being the largest. The operculum is ovate and thick, with an apical nucleus.

== Species ==
Species within the genus Triumphis include:

- † Triumphis dilemma Kilburn & Tankard, 1975
- Triumphis distorta (Wood, 1828)
- † Triumphis maitenlahuensis S. N. Nielsen & Frassinetti, 2003
- † Triumphis solida (E. T. Nelson, 1870)

Species brought into synonymy

- Triumphis subrostrata (W. Wood, 1828): synonym of Nicema subrostrata (W. Wood, 1828)
