= Sander Rang =

French conchologist (1793–1844)

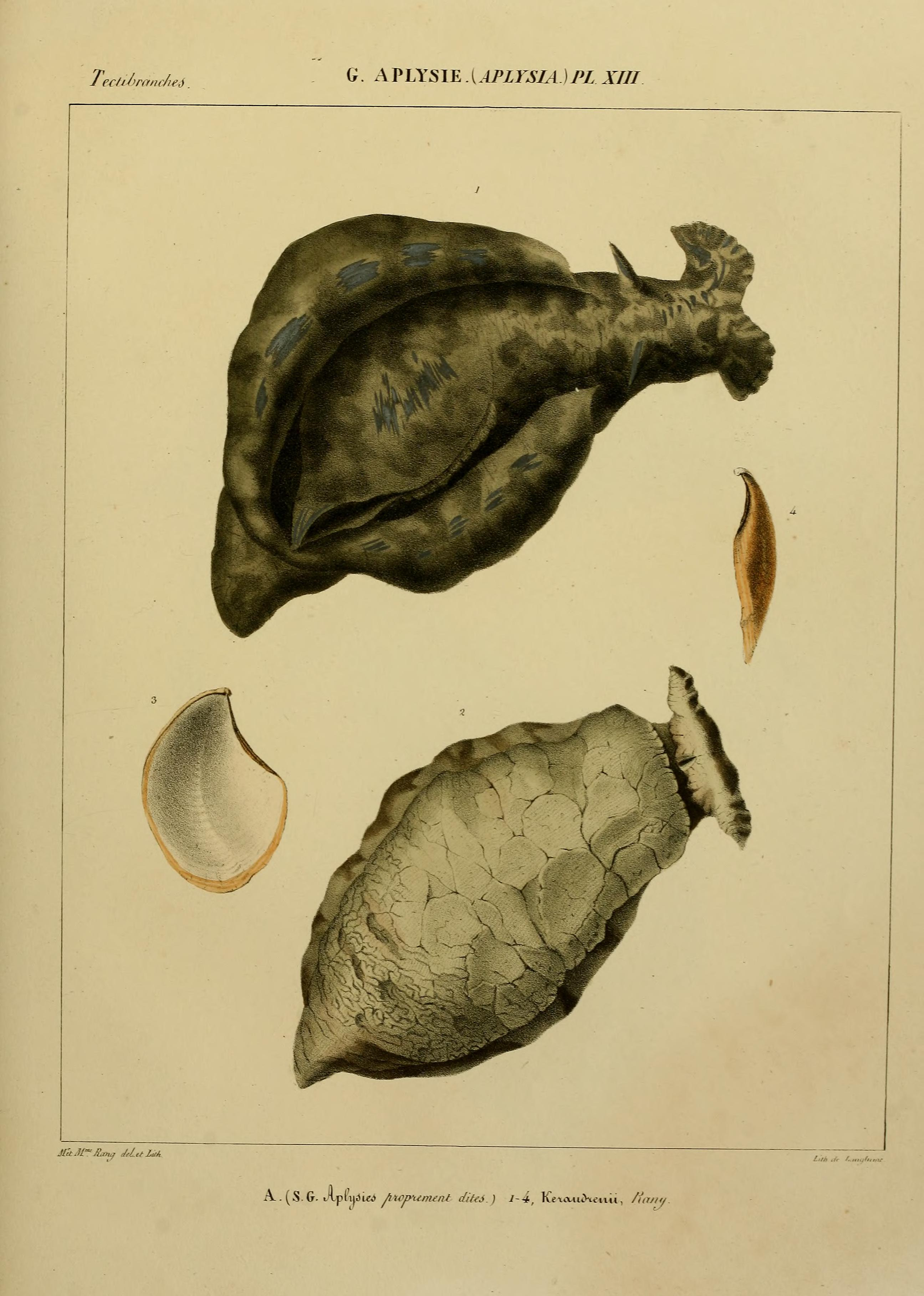
Histoire naturelle des Aplysiens Plate 13 by Louise Rang

Sander Rang or Paul Charles Leonard Alexander Rang (28 June 1793 – 16 June 1844) was a French conchologist and interpreter of Arabic texts. In 1816, he was one of the survivors of the sinking of the frigate Medusa, on which he was an ensign. He spent a good part of his life in La Rochelle, where he published his early zoological observations, in particular in the bulletins of the Society of Natural Sciences of Charente-Maritimes.In 1841 Rang was one of the founding members of the Société des Amis des Arts now the Musée des Beaux-Arts de La Rochelle.He specialised in marine fauna notably in sea hares, cephalopods and other molluscs and on the heterogenous group known as zoophytes. Sander Rang described many new mollusc species including the sea hares Aplysia dactylomela, Dolabrifera dolabrifera, the cuttlefish Sepia hierredda and the land snails Striosubulina striatella, Pleurodonte desidens and Opeas hannense.

== Biography ==
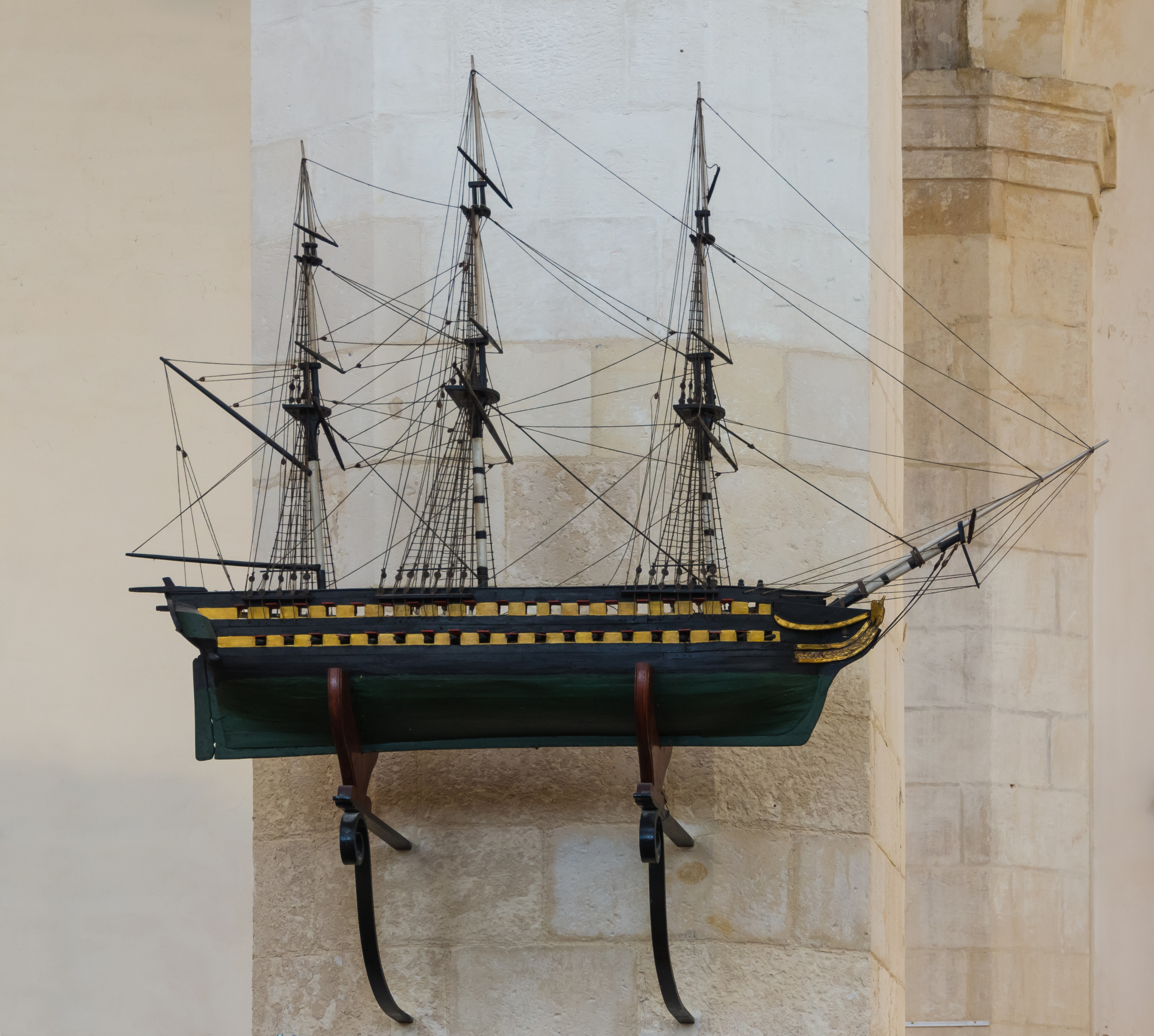
Ship Augustin de la Rochelle, c. 1810

Sander Rang was born on 28 June 1793 in Utrecht. He was born into a family of Protestant bourgeoisie (people with private wealth, an upper class social status, and its related culture) from Vivarais. His grandfather was Alexandre Rang des Adrets (1722–1792) a pastor from Crest, in the Drôme. His father, Jean-Alexandre Rang des Adrets (1757–1824) also a pastor, went into exile in Utrecht. Later he settled in La Rochelle. Sander Rang was born in Utrecht in 1793. He spent a good part of his life in La Rochelle.In 1816, aged 23, he enlisted on La Méduse a frigate ferrying French officials to the port of Saint-Louis, in Senegal. Ineptly commanded, La Méduse struck the Bank of Arguin off the coast of present-day Mauritania and became a total loss. Sander Rang was on the captain's boat and not on the ill-fated raft. His manuscript account of these events was published in 1946.

By then a Chevalier de la Légion d'Honneur, he married Perrine Esther Agathe Louise Cassen-Vaucorbeil (1805–1884) (best known as Louise Rang-Rabut) at Île-de-France in 1827. She was a painter taught by Eugène Delacroix and the couple participated in all the cultural activities of La Rochelle. On 4 October 1829 he left the naval port of Toulon commanding the naval brig (brick de L'Etat) La Champenoise embarked for first Almeria, then Gorée and the Senegal coast then Ile de prince then to Brazil. At the time such voyages were a part of the expansion of the French colonial empire but Rang's naval duties allowed sufficient time to collect molluscs. Promoted to the rank of Captain 1st Class of corvette, he left La Rochelle and became captain of the port of Algiers in 1834. In 1837 he has the rank Officieur superiéure au Corps royal de la Marines and he was appointed administrator (superior commander) of Mayotte in 1842. He died of a fever in Mayotte on 16 June 1844. His wife married a banker in La Rochelle, Théophile Babut a year later.

== Societies ==
- Society of Natural Sciences of Charente-Maritimes
- Corresponding Member Société d'Histoire Naturelle de Paris from 1825
- Société linnéenne de Bordeaux

== Publications ==
partial list

- M. Rang, 1825 Description d’un genre nouveau de la classe des Ptéropodes et de deux espèces nouvelles du genre Clio Annales des sciences naturelles, Paris, Éd. Béchet jeune, vol. 5, 1825, p. 283-287 online BNF
- Alexandre Rang and Charles des Moulins, 1828 Description de trois genres nouveaux de coquilles fossiles du terrain tertiaire de Bordeaux, savoir : Spiricella, Gratelupia et Jouannetia (avec la collab. de Charles Des Moulins), Bordeaux, Impr. de R. Laguillotière, 1828, 31 p. online — Extrait du Bulletin d’histoire naturelle de la Société linnéenne de Bordeaux, tome 2, 6e livraison, 23 décembre 1828.
- M. Rang, 1827 Description d’une espèce d’Hyale à l’état fossile Mémoires de la Société d’histoire naturelle de Paris, Paris, Éd. Baudouin frères, vol. 3, 1827, p. 382-383 online
- M Rang, 1827 Observations sur le genre Atlante Mémoires de la Société d’histoire naturelle de Paris, Paris, Éd. Baudouin frères, vol. 3, 1827, p. 372-381
- 1827 with André Étienne d'Audebert de Férussac. Catalogue des espèces de mollusques terrestres et fluviatiles, recueillis par M. Rang, offic. de la marine roy., dans un voyage aux grandes Indes. Bulletin des Sciences Naturelles et de Géologie, deuxième Section du Bulletin Universel des Sciences et de l'Industrie 10 (200): 298-307. 1827 online AnimalBase online BHL
- M. Sander Rang, 1828 Histoire naturelle des Aplysiens : première famille de l'ordre des tectibranches De L'imprimerie de Firmin Didot, 1828.Illustrations by Perrine Louise Rang online
- M. Rang, 1828 Établissement de la famille des Béroïdes dans l’ordre des Acalèphes libres, et description de deux genres nouveaux qui lui appartiennent Mémoires de la Société d’histoire naturelle de Paris, Paris, Éd. Baudouin frères, vol. 4, 1828, p. 166-173 online
- M Rang, 1828 Notice sur quelques mollusques nouveaux appartenant au genre Cléodore, et établissement et monographie du sous-genre Creseis Annales des sciences naturelles Paris, Éd. Crochard, vol. 13, 1828, p. 302-319 online BNF
- Rang, Sander. 1829. Manuel de l'histoire naturelle des mollusques et de leurs coquilles : ayant pour base de classification celle de M. le baron Cuvier. Paris. [In French] online plates 1843 see below.
- M. Rang, 1829 Description de cinq espèces de coquilles fossiles appartenant à la classe des Ptéropodes, Annales des sciences naturelles, Paris, Éd. Crochard, vol. 16, 1829, p. 492-499 online
- M. Rang, 1829 Notice sur le Litiope, nouveau genre de mollusque gastéropode Annales des sciences naturelles, Paris, Éd. Crochard, vol. 16, 1829, p. 303-307 online
- M Rang, 1829 Observations de M. Rang sur une espèce nouvelle de Carinaire, Annales des sciences naturelles, Paris, Éd. Crochard, vol. 16, 1829, p. 136-140 online
- M Rang, 1830 Note sur le Ropan d’Adanson et quelques autres observations sur les mollusques Annales des sciences naturelles Paris, Éd. Crochard, vol. 21, 1830, p. 352 (chiffrée par erreur 351) online
- M. Rang, 1831 Description des coquilles terrestres recueillies pendant un voyage à la côte occidentale d’Afrique, et au Brésil, Annales des sciences naturelles, Paris, Éd. Crochard, vol. 24, 1831, pp. 5–63 online
- M. Rang, 1831-1843 Magasin de zoologie (publié par Félix Édouard Guérin-Méneville), Paris, Éd. Lequien puis Arthus Bertrand, 1831-1845, in-8° Numerous contributions by Sander Rang in this periodical which became, in 1839 : Magasin de zoologie, d’anatomie comparée et de palæontologie online at Gallica
- M Rang, 1832 Notice sur la Galathée, genre de mollusque acéphale de la famille des Conchacées Annales des sciences naturelles, Paris, Éd. Crochard, vol. 25, 1832, p. 152-164 online
- R. Rang, 1833 Dictionnaire pittoresque d’histoire naturelle et des phénomènes de la nature, contenant l’histoire des animaux, des végétaux, des minéraux(publié sous la dir. de Félix Guérin-Méneville, Paris, au Bureau de souscription, 1833-1839, 12 vol. grd in-8° online— Les planches occupent trois vol. Sander Rang a fourni plusieurs contributions à ce dictionnaire. Elles sont signées de l’initiale R.
- MM.Rang and Cailliaud, 1834 Mémoire sur le genre Éthérie et description de son animal (avec la collab. de Caillaud), 1834, 16 p. online — Extrait des Nouvelles Annales du Muséum d’histoire naturelle, t. 3, p. 128 et suivantes.
- M. Rang, 1834 Mémoire sur le genre Gnatodon et description de son animal, Paris, Impr. de Jules Didot l’aîné, [1834], 13 p., in-8° — Extrait des Nouvelles Annales du Muséum d’histoire naturelle, tome 3, p. 217 et suivantes.online
- M. Rang, 1835 Mémoire sur quelques Acéphales d’eau douce du Sénégal, pour servir à la malacologie de l’Afrique occidentale », Nouvelles annales du Muséum d’histoire naturelle, Paris, Libr. encyclopédique de Roret, vol. 4, 1835, p. 297-320 online
- M. Rang, 1837 Documents pour servir à l’histoire naturelle des Céphalopodes cryptodibranches, Magasin de zoologie, Paris, Éd. Lequien fils, vol. 7, 1837, p. 5-77 online
- Sandar Rang and Ferdinand Denis, 1837 Fondation de la Régence d’Alger : histoire des Barberousse, chronique arabe du XVIe siècle... (avec la collab. de Ferdinand Denis), Paris, J. Angé, 1837, 2 vol. in-8° (lire en ligne [archive] [PDF]). — Rééd. : Id., Tunis, Bouslama, 1984; Fondation de la régence d’Alger : histoire des frères Barberousse, Alger, Éd. Grand-Alger-Livres, 2006.Online Volume 1, Online Volume 2
- 1843 Atlas des mollusques composé de 51 planches représentant la plupart des mollusques nus et des coquilles décrits dans le Manuel d’histoire naturelle, Paris, Éd. Roret, [1843], 16 p., in-16 online text Rang, Sander, 1829 above
- Rang, P. C. A. L., 1852 Histoire naturelle des mollusques ptéropodes : monographie comprenant la description de toutes les espèces de ce groupe de mollusques (avec la collab. de Louis François Auguste Souleyet), Paris, Éd. J.-B. Baillière, 1852, IV-88 p., grd in-4° online, online (plates)
- Port d’Alger : projet Rang, du 5 avril 1840, Paris, Impr. de H. Fournier, 1842, 8 p., in-4°. (see Sander Rang, Victor Poirel, Antoine Dominique Raffeneau de Lile et al., 1842)
- 1842 Précis analytique de l’histoire d’Alger sous l’occupation turque, dans Ministère de la Guerre, Tableau de la situation des établissements français dans l’Algérie en 1841, Paris, Impr. royale, décembre 1842, 445 p., in-4° online
- Sander Rang, Victor Poirel, Antoine Dominique Raffeneau de Lile et al., 1842 Projets divers pour le port d’Alger, [1842], 1 feuille 86,5 x 71,5 cm online at Gallica — Cette feuille regroupe 9 plans différents dont celui de Sander Rang.
- 1946 [sic] Voyage au Sénégal; Naufrage de La Méduse (ill. Philippe Ledoux), Paris, Éd. E.P.I., 1946, 121 p., in-8°. — Repris dans les recueils suivants : Relation complète du naufrage de la frégate La Méduse, faisant partie de l’expédition du Sénégal en 1816, Paris, Éd. J. de Bonnot, 1968, 419 p., in-8°; Les Naufragés : témoignages vécus, XVIIe-XXe siècle (présentation Dominique Le Brun), Paris, Éd. Omnibus, 2014, 906 p., in-8° (ISBN 978-2-258-10649-9).

== Taxa named and described by Rang ==
- Cavolinia uncinata (Rang, 1829) – Uncinate Cavoline
- Cuvierina columnella (Rang, 1827)
- Cuvierina (Cuvierina) astesana (Rang, 1829) – (Pliocene)
- Creseis Rang, 1828 Genus
- Creseis clava (Rang, 1828) (synonym: Creseis acicula (Rang, 1828)
- Creseis virgula (Rang, 1828)
- Creseis spinifera Rang, 1828) synonym of Styliola subula (Quoy & Gaimard, 1827) and Genus Styliola Gray, 1850
- Dolabrifera dolabrifera (Rang, 1828)
- Melibe Rang, 1829 Genus
- Melibe rosea Rang, 1829
- Aplysia dactylomela (Rang, 1828)
- Aplysia brasiliana Rang, 1828 synonym of Aplysia fasciata Poiret, 1789 -the sooty sea hare
- Aplysia keraudreni Rang, 1828
- Aplysia maculata Rang, 1828
- Aplysia protea Rang, 1828
- Plakobranchidae Rang, 1829
- Notarchus pleii (Rang, 1828): synonym of Bursatella leachii pleii Rang, 1828
- Petalifera petalifera Rang, 1828
- Litiopa melanostoma (Rang, 1829)
- Litiopa Rang, 1829 - the type genus of the family Litiopidae[3]
- Subulina striatella (Rang, 1831): synonym of Striosubulina striatella (Rang, 1831)
- Sepioteuthis biangutata Rang, 1837 synonym of Sepioteuthis sepioidea
- Opeas hannense (Rang, 1831)
- Subulina striatella (Rang, 1831)
- Pleurodonte desidens (Rang, 1834) - was endemic to Martinique
- Marginella helmatina (Rang, 1829)
- Sepia hierredda Rang in Férussac & d'Orbigny, 1835 -the giant African cuttlefish
- Aclesia Rang, 1828: Genus synonym of Bursatella Blainville, 1817 -the shaggy sea hare
- Bulla viridis Rang in Quoy & Gaimard, 1832 Type species of Smaragdinella A. Adams, 1848
- Pleurobranchus reticulatus Rang, 1832 - a sea slug
- Hydromyles globulosus (Rang, 1825) - a sea slug
- Fulmentum sepimentum (Rang, 1832) a sea snail
- Hyalimax mauritianus Rang, 1827 - a land slug from Mauritius.
- Pterosomatidae Rang, 1829 synonym of Carinariinae Blainville, 1818
- Venus rosalina Rang, 1802- a marine bivalve
- Megalobulimus granulosus (Rang, 1831) - a land snail from Brazil
- Loligo vitreus Rang, 1835 in Férussac & D'Orbigny, 1834-1848 synonym of Ommastrephes bartramii (Lesueur, 1821)

== Taxa named for Rang ==
- Rangia, Desmoulins, 1832
- Holopus rangi d'Orbigny, 1837.
