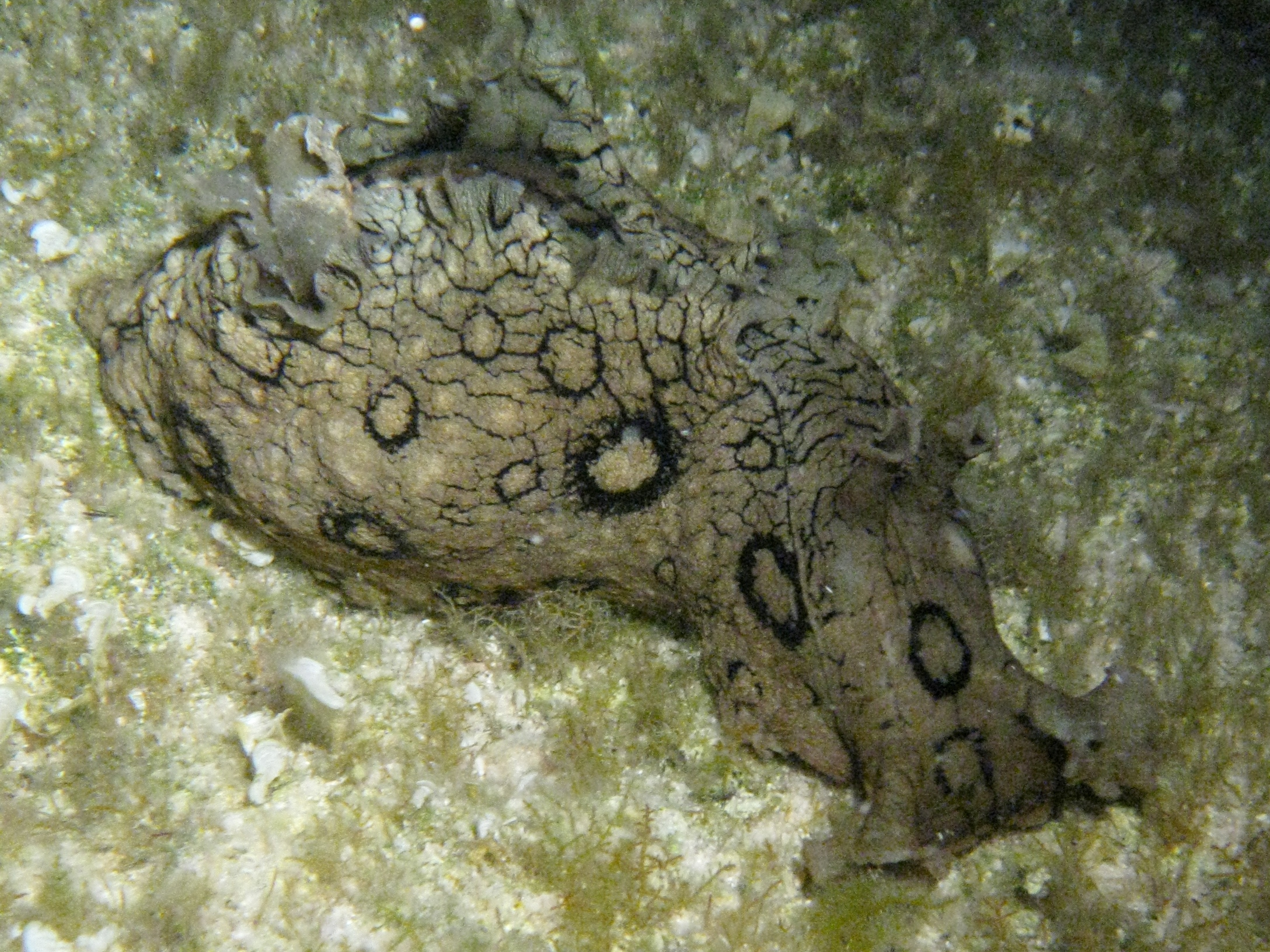

Scientific classification
- Kingdom: Animalia
- Phylum: Mollusca
- Class: Gastropoda
- Order: Aplysiida
- Family: Aplysiidae
- Genus: Aplysia
- Species: A. dactylomela

Binomial name
- Aplysia dactylomela (Rang, 1828)

Synonyms
- List: Aplysia angasi G.B. Sowerby II, 1869; Aplysia annulifera Thiele, 1930; Aplysia aequorea Heilprin, 1888; Aplysia benedicti Eliot, 1899; Aplysia bourailli Risbec, 1951; Aplysia fimbriata Adams & Reeve, 1850; Aplysia megaptera A. E. Verrill, 1900; Aplysia ocellata A. d'Orbigny, 1839; Aplysia odorata Risbec, 1928; Aplysia operta Burne, 1906; Aplysia protea Rang, 1828; Aplysia radiata Ehrenberg, 1831; Aplysia schrammii Deshayes, 1857; Aplysia scutellata Ehrenberg, 1831; Aplysia tigrina Rang, 1828; Aplysia velifer Bergh, 1905; Varria dactylomela Rang, 1828; Tethys panamensis Pilsbry, 1895

= Aplysia dactylomela =

Species of gastropod

Aplysia dactylomela, the spotted sea hare, is a species of large sea slug, a marine opisthobranch gastropod in the family Aplysiidae, the sea hares.

== Distribution and taxonomy ==
As traditionally defined, this species of sea hare was cosmopolitan, being found in almost all tropical and warm temperate seas, including the Mediterranean Sea where first seen in 2002 and likely self-established due to increasing temperatures.

Based on genetic evidence, the population from the Indo-Pacific region is now recognized as a separate species, A. argus. This restricts the true A. dactylomela to the Atlantic Ocean region, including the Caribbean and Mediterranean. The appearance of the two species is very similar, although A. argus is more variable in colour and pattern.

== Description ==
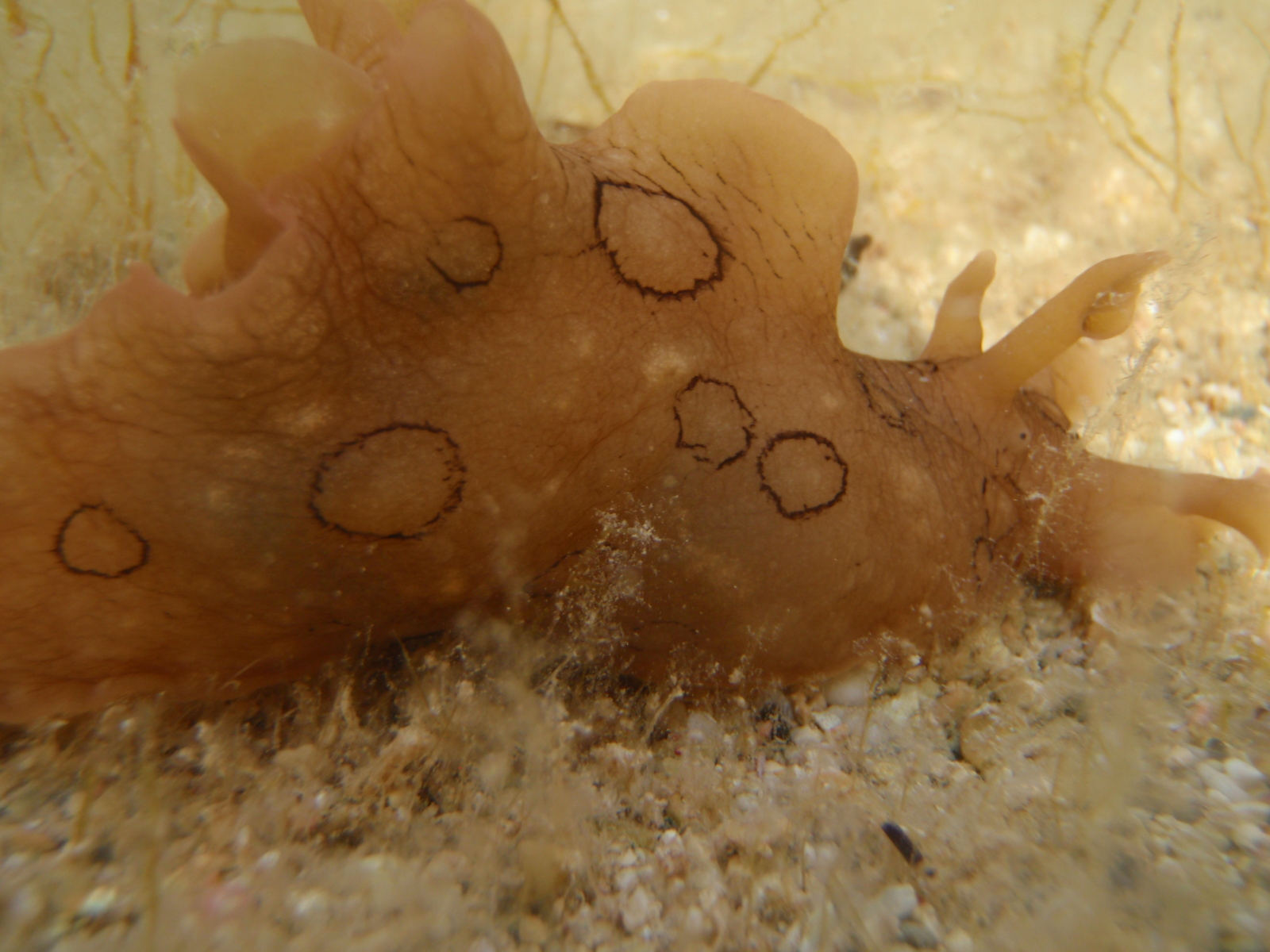
The large black rings are very apparent on this juvenile spotted sea hare

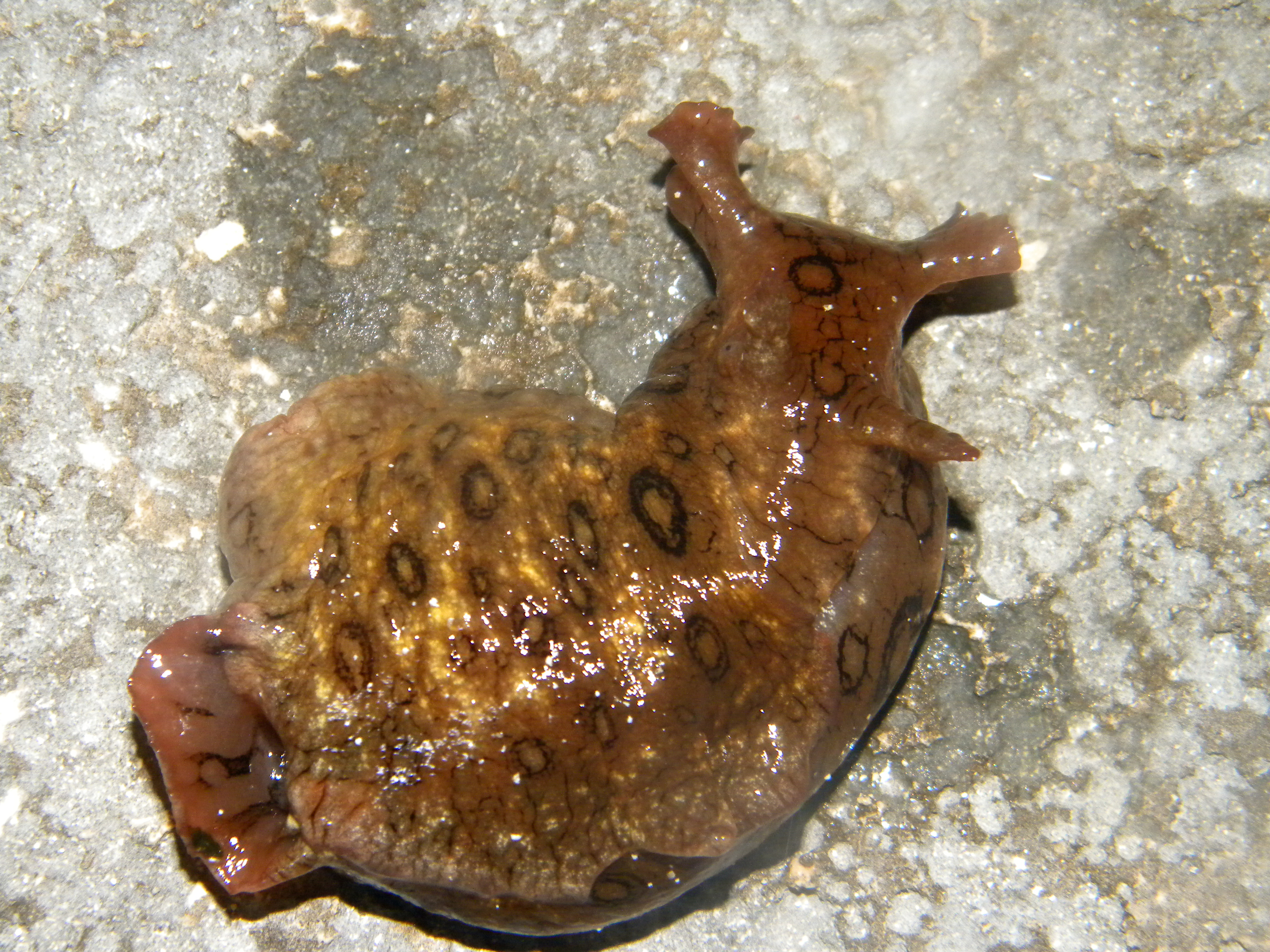
Aplysia dactylomela taken out of water

The colour of the spotted sea hare is very variable, from pale gray to green, to dark brown. There are almost always large black rings on the mantle.

The maximum recorded length is 410 mm.

The shell is hatchet-shaped, solid, and pale straw in color, marked by distantly spaced concentric undulations. It is highly oblique and deeply convex, with a testaceous (shelly) interior. The apex is significantly elevated, strongly curved inward, and notably calloused. The upper margin is deeply excavated, broadly reflected, and acuminated (pointed) at its extremity. The outer lip is produced and rounded. The dorsal margin is rounded superiorly, then slopes towards the outer lip inferiorly, appearing arched and excavated.

== Habitat ==
Aplysia dactylomela is commonly found in shallow waters, tide pools and rocky and sandy substrates, they also will be found feeding in beds of sea grass. During the day they will mostly hide under large rocks and in crevices. They usually stay in relatively shallow water, but they have been found as deep as 40 m.

Minimum recorded depth is 0 m. Maximum recorded depth is 3 m.

== Human use ==
The right giant neuron of Aplysia dactylomela, which is found in the abdominal ganglion, is similar to that of vertebrates, meaning it is ideal for the study of electrophysiology, as well as conditioned-response studies. These neurons have been found to be invaluable in neurological research; the reason for this is that long-lasting effects in neuronal behavior can be detected.

== Behaviour ==
The Aplysia dactylomela is capable of swimming and crawling. It accomplishes the former by creating a funnel using the parapodia folded forward and downwards; this action pulls in water. It then pushes the water out from behind the animal by pressing the anterior parts of the parapodia together, thus forward motion is achieved.

The sea hare's usual mode of propulsion is crawling; it crawls by lifting the front end of the foot, stretching it forward then placing it on the ground in front, creating an arching pattern; the remainder of the body follows this arching pattern until the tail is reached.

== Defense ==
Like the octopus, the Aplysia dactylomela squirts purple ink if it is disturbed; this ink is an irritant that causes 'altered behaviour' in other invertebrates and fish. Their leathery skin contains toxins which make this sea hare practically inedible to most predators.
