= Sahara Seamounts =

Group of seamounts in the Atlantic Ocean southwest of the Canary Islands

Coordinates: 25°30′N 19°50′W

The Sahara Seamounts are a group of seamounts which are located in the Atlantic Ocean between 140 and 190 mi (230 and 310 km) southwest of the island of El Hierro, part of the Canary Islands. A number of these seamounts are placed on the sea bed at depths of almost 4,000 m (13,000 ft) and some summits are just 200 m (660 ft) below sea level. An example of this is the seamount called Echo, which is also called the Endeavour Bank, where the summit is made up of a large plateau covering an area of 350 km^{2} (140 mi^{2}), at depths of between 230 and 350 m (750 and 1,150 ft) and with the slopes dropping down to 3,800 m (12,500 ft) into the deep. The presence of seismic lines around these seamounts show local unconformity or even sills which are quite high up among the sedimentary series and these features suggest that there was volcanic activity as late as at least the Cenozoic.

These seamounts are home to a variety of marine life including deep-sea sharks (such as the Bluntnose sixgill shark Hexanchus griseus, rays, wreckfish, conger eels, gadellas, escolars, roughies and other species of fish that occur in the extensive areas of sponges, gorgonians and corals. They contain the most southerly known beds of the glass sponges Asconema setubalense. Images taken from an ROV show that these seamounts have rocky and sandy sea beds which are volcanic in origin and that they contain numerous caves, overhangs and cracks which shelter a variety of animals.

These seamounts may be rich in certain minerals and the crust is rich in cobalt, as sampling at the Tropic Seamount, one of the Sahara Seamounts, showed.
