= Tropic Seamount =

Underwater mountain near the Canary Islands

- Tropic Seamount (North Atlantic) Location offshore Africa
- Summit depth: 970 m (3,180 ft)

Location
- Location: North Atlantic
- Group: Canary Islands Seamount Province
- Coordinates: 23.89°N 20.72°W

Tropic Seamount is a Cretaceous (Note: Between ca. 145 and 66 million years ago.) seamount, part of the Canary Islands Seamount Province. It is located west of the Western Sahara's coastline and southwest of the Canary Islands, north of Cape Verde. It is one of a number of seamounts (a type of underwater volcanic mountain) in this part of the Atlantic Ocean, probably formed by volcanic processes triggered by the proximity to the African continent. Tropic Seamount is located at a depth of 970 metres (3,180 ft) and has a summit platform with an area of 120 square kilometres (46 sq mi).

Tropic Seamount is formed by volcanic rocks including basalt and trachyte and was probably an island at first; for reasons unknown it sank to its present-day depth. Large landslides and late volcanic activity affected the seamount, cutting large scars into its flanks and forming cones on its summit plateau, respectively. Volcanic activity at Tropic Seamount commenced almost 120 million years ago and ended about 60 million years ago. Later, sedimentation commenced on the seamount leading to the deposition of manganese crusts and pelagic sediments; iron and manganese accumulated in crusts over time beginning a few tens of millions of years ago.

== Name ==
Tropic Seamount lies close to the Tropic of Cancer, thus the name. It is also known as "Tropical Bank" or "Carmenchu Peak", the latter named after Me. del Carmen Piernavieja y Oramas of Las Palmas, Spain; this nomenclature reflected the idea that Carmenchu Peak was a separate summit. The seamount is recognized by the International Hydrographic Organization. An alternative name "Tropic Guyot" has been proposed and the diminutive "Tropiquito" was applied to another smaller seamount in the region.

== Geography and geomorphology ==
Tropic Seamount lies in the northeast Atlantic Ocean 470 kilometres (290 mi) west of Cape Blanc and 400 kilometres (250 mi) south of the Canary Islands off the coast of Northwestern Africa. The area around Tropic Seamount is subject to competing territorial claims by Morocco and Spain. The seamount has been prospected for mining of its mineral resources.

=== Regional ===
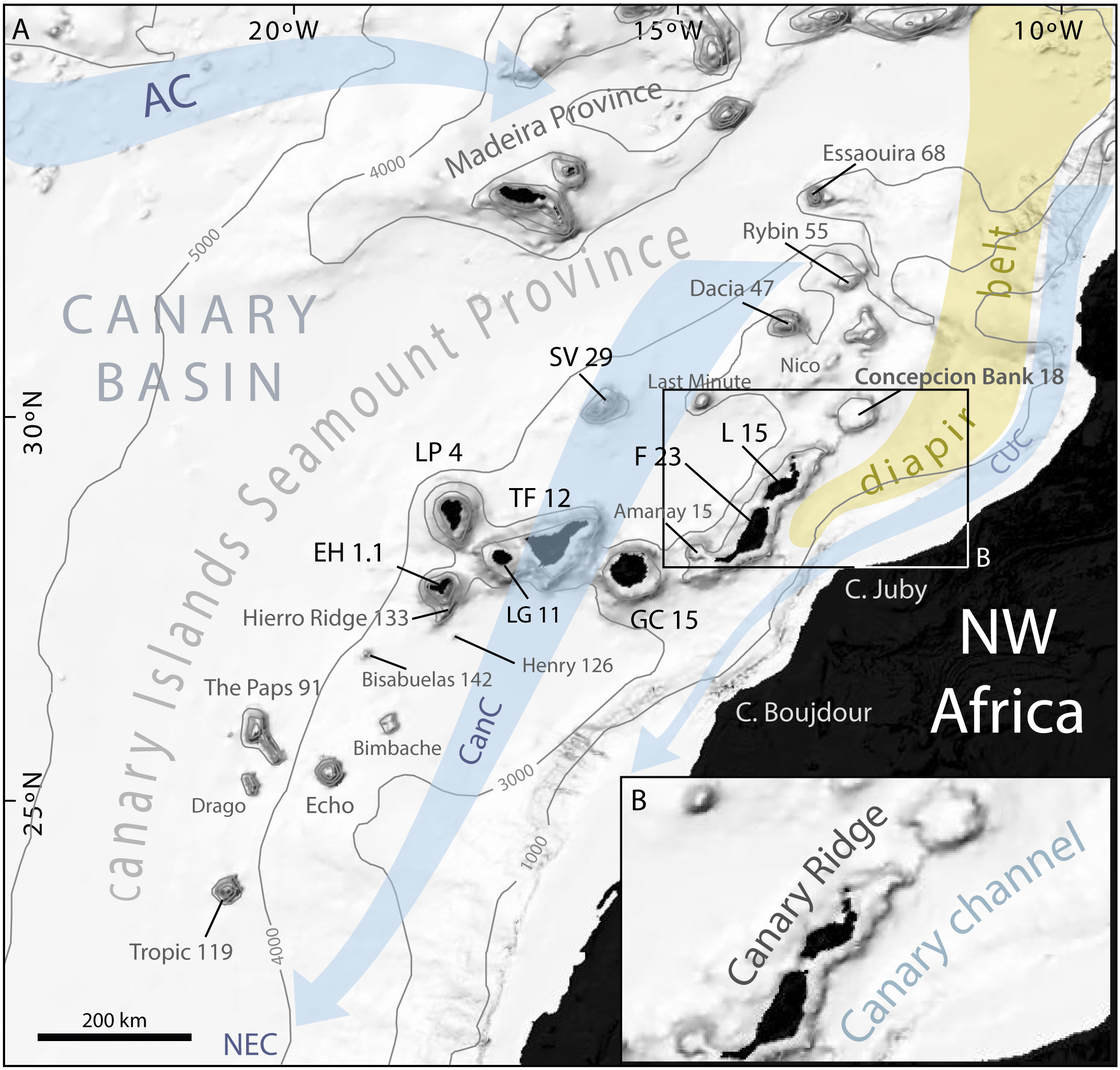
Tropic 119 is the southwesternmost element of the CISP

Tropic Seamount is the southernmost member of the Canary Islands Seamount Province (CISP), which extends from north of Lanzarote in the Canary Islands to southwest of the archipelago and contains over a hundred seamounts in a space 1,000 kilometres (620 mi) long. This province aside from Tropic Seamount, which is its southernmost member, includes The Paps Seamount, Ico Seamount, Echo Bank and Drago Seamount but also Essaouira Seamount north of Lanzarote. Especially the southern among these underwater mountains are poorly studied. Tropic Seamount has also been counted among the Saharan Seamounts. Aside from the seamounts, submarine canyons and large debris flows occur in the region such as the Sahara Slide which has run around Echo Bank.

=== Local ===
The isolated seamount lies about halfway between the Canary Islands and Cape Verde, 480 kilometres (260 nmi) west of the Western Sahara and on the upper continental rise. It is a 42 by 37 kilometres (26 mi × 23 mi) wide guyot with the shape described as a diamond or of a square and a summit area with a four-point star form. The seafloor around Tropic Seamount has an age of about 155-150 million years and is covered by Quaternary silt, pelagic ooze and aeolian sediments; there is no indication of other volcanic edifices in the neighbourhood or of a swell although the so-called San Borondón crest connects it to Echo Bank.

The seamount rises 3.2 kilometres (2.0 mi) from a depth of 4,200 metres (13,800 ft) to a depth of 1,000 metres (3,300 ft) and a diamond-shaped flat summit that has a surface area of about 120 square kilometres (46 sq mi) and is covered with pelagic ooze and sediments; the shallowest sector of the seamount lies at 970 metres (3,180 ft) depth. This flat summit is covered by 10–20 metres (33–66 ft) high volcanic cones and features terraces at the margin of the summit as well as ridges that point due north, east, south and west. Volcanic cones are concentrated in the southern and eastern parts of the summit platform. The seamount has a volume of about 300 cubic kilometres (72 cu mi), similar to other Atlantic Ocean volcanoes. Raised beaches have been reported from Tropic Seamount.

The outer slopes of the seamount become steeper to the summit perhaps due to geochemical differences between the rocks that form the lower slopes and these of the upper slopes. They are cut by curved flank collapses that open to the northeast, southeast, southwest and northwest; these collapses have cut into the volcanic edifice and have left ridges between the individual collapses which give the seamount its four-point star form and deposited debris around the seamount, although the deposits are not recognizable probably because they are old and buried beneath sediments. In addition there are 3–10 kilometres (1.9–6.2 mi) long gullies formed either by erosional or volcanic processes that descend the slopes of the seamount between its ridges, as well as parasitic vents and volcanic ridges.

== Geology ==
The geological origin of the Canary Islands Seamounts are unclear, with various hotspot processes as well as crustal and mantle phenomena proposed. The age progression from either Essaouira Seamount or Lanzarote-Fuerteventura to El Hierro-La Palma has been interpreted as indicating a hotspot process but the considerably higher ages of the submarine volcanism both in the Canaries and at the Canary Islands Seamounts are not compatible with a hotspot origin. An alternative theory posits that mantle convection is driven by the close distance between the seamounts and the African continent and generated these volcanoes beginning in the Cretaceous. There is no indication of a mantle plume track at Tropic Seamount. Volcanic activity at Echo and Tropic seamounts was probably focused and generated a circular volcanic structure, while at Drago and The Paps it was controlled by lineaments and thus formed elongated edifices.

=== Composition ===
Dredging has produced basaltic and carbonatic rocks that are partly covered by ferromanganese crusts (Note: A ferromanganese crust is a deposit of minerals underwater, that forms through the precipitation of metals dissolved in the water column.) or chemically altered by phosphate. In addition, shallow water calcarenites, conglomerates, coral debris, hemipelagic sediments, breccia, limestones, felsite, foraminiferal sand, pelagic ooze, reefal limestones and sediments have been recovered.

The volcanic rocks include alkali basalts, basanite, hyaloclastite, palagonite, picrite, pumices, basaltic tuffs, trachybasalt and trachyte and define an alkaline ocean island basalt suite although the existence of tholeiites as in Hawaii is possible and substantial amounts of evolved volcanic rocks have been recovered; these were probably generated by basaltic melts in magma chambers. Minerals contained in the rocks include mafic clots, amphibole, apatite, clinopyroxene including augite, olivine, plagioclase, spinel and titanomagnetite. Non-hydrothermal chemical alteration has taken place and has formed carbonate, celadonite, chlorite, hematite, prehnite, quartz, smectite and rare zeolites.

Thick ferromanganese deposits were recovered from the seamount in 1992 by the RV Sonne and are found especially on the western flank but also in the summit region, often over partly consolidated sediments. They have the appearance of a black crust. Components include asbolane, carbonate fluorapatite, goethite, palygorskite, todorokite and vernadite as well as minor calcite and quartz; the crusts which occur on the Canary Islands Seamounts including at Tropic Seamount reach thicknesses of 20 centimetres (7.9 in) and are rich in cobalt, tellurium and other elements of industrial importance. At Tropic Seamount they formed from water but were also influenced by material coming from Africa and by global and northern hemisphere climate conditions.

== Environment ==
Water temperatures and salinity of the water masses around Tropic Seamount decrease with increasing depth and ripples indicate that strong ocean currents affect the seamount. A number of separate water masses surround the seamount, which originate from regions such as the North Atlantic, the South Atlantic and Antarctica and are stacked over each other. Upwelling delivers highly nutrient-rich waters to the seamount.

Corals and sponges and more generally sessile fauna cover parts of the eastern and western spurs of Tropic Seamount, forming multicoloured "forests", sponge aggregations and coral gardens; among the animals are glass sponges. Other species drill tunnels into rocks. Ages of corals range from 100 years to 148,000 years, but live specimens have also been recovered. Coral growth appears to increase during glacial times and in the recent 1,000 years, while decreasing during periods with low supply of Sahara dust.

Common coral species encountered at Tropic Seamount are Caryophyllia sp., Desmophyllum dianthus, Javania caelleti, Madrepora oculata and Solenosmilia variabilis. The bivalve Rhinoclama teres and the echinoids Echinocyamus scaber, Palaeotropus josephinae, Peripatagus cinctus and Selenocidaris varispina have been found on this seamount, as are xenophyophorea.

== Geologic history ==
Tropic Seamount appears to be the oldest among the Canary Islands Seamounts. Ages of samples from its southwestern slopes range from 119.3 ± 0.3 to 113.9 ± 0.2 million years ago while the northern slopes have produced ages of 84 to 59 million years ago; this has been interpreted as meaning that Tropic Seamount was active mainly between 119 and 114 million years ago in the late Aptian but later volcanic activity continued until about 60 million years ago in the middle Paleocene. Later volcanic activity may have formed the mounds on the summit plateau. When Tropic Seamount was active the Atlantic Ocean was much narrower than today and dinosaurs still roamed the Earth.

Tropic Seamount once formed an island before it was eroded down to its current depth. Flat topped summits can form through diverse mechanisms; waves eroding an island is the preferred theory in the case of Tropic Seamount as there is little evidence of caldera-forming volcanic activity. How this former island subsided to a depth of 1 kilometre (0.62 mi) however is unclear.

The growth of ferromanganese crusts began probably no earlier than 76 million years ago in the late Cretaceous and would be one among the oldest such crusts recovered if it is that old. Other crusts began developing about 30 million years ago, with a younger generation of crusts developing starting from 12 ± 2 million years ago. Phosphate-mediated alteration has been dated to 46 ± 10 or 38 ± 1.2 million years ago; this corresponds to an episode of similar alteration in Pacific seamounts and appears to have been caused by colder, faster ocean currents at that time. The alteration of carbonates by phosphates and the presence of phosphorite crusts indicate that the seamount has been inactive for a long time. On the other hand, it and other seamounts in the region may have been affected by geological processes between the Miocene and Pleistocene, and Tropic could have been a source of Pleistocene debris that covers the seafloor to its east.
