= Luizia zebrina =

Scientific classification
- Kingdom: Animalia
- Phylum: Mollusca
- Class: Gastropoda
- Subclass: Caenogastropoda
- Order: Neogastropoda
- Family: Pseudolividae
- Genus: Luizia
- Species: L. zebrina

Binomial name
- Luizia zebrina (A. Adams, 1855)

Synonyms
- Pseudoliva zebrina A. Adams, 1855

Species of gastropod

Luizia zebrina is a species of sea snail, a marine gastropod mollusk in the family Pseudolividae.
