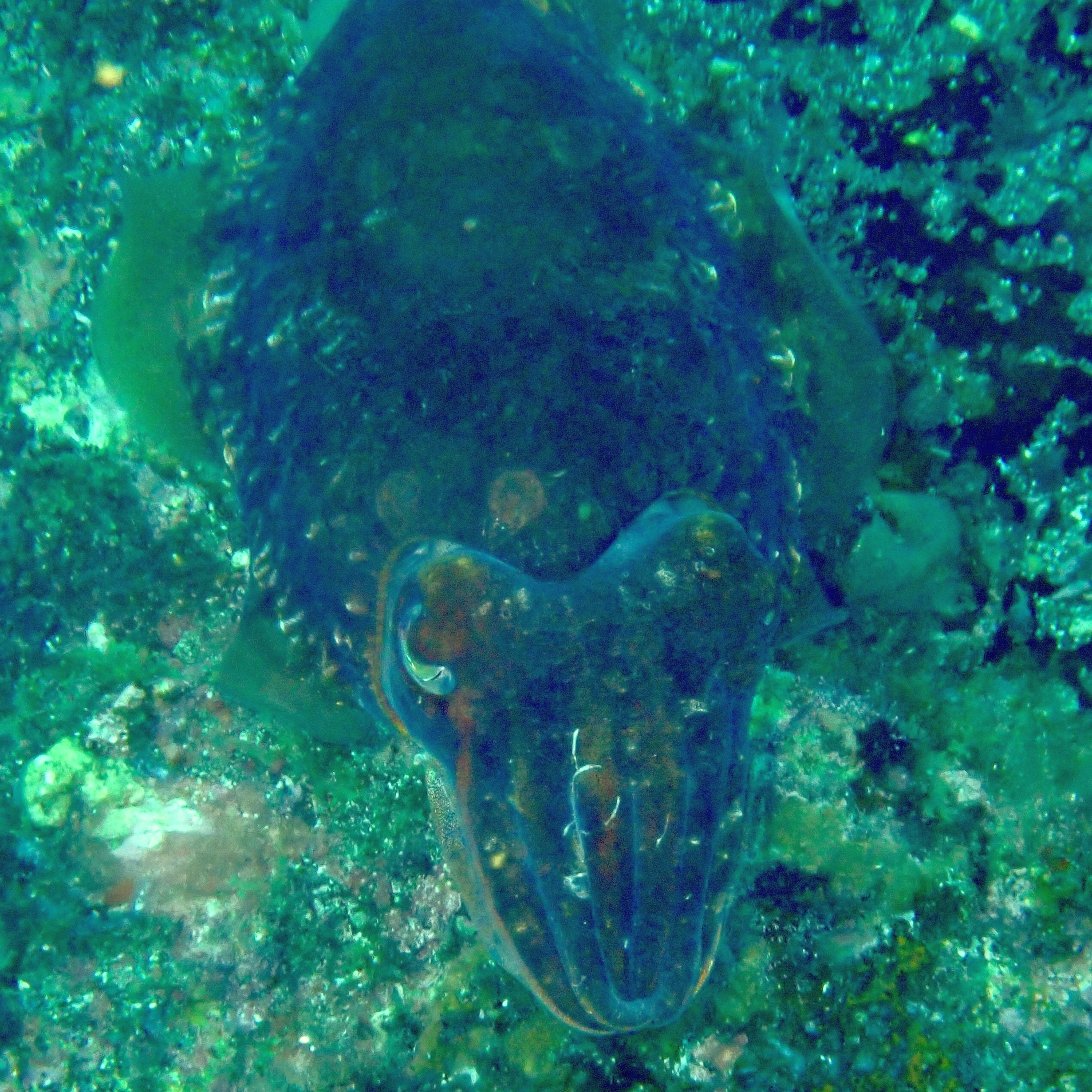

Conservation status
- Data Deficient (IUCN 3.1)

Scientific classification
- Kingdom: Animalia
- Phylum: Mollusca
- Class: Cephalopoda
- Order: Sepiida
- Family: Sepiidae
- Genus: Sepia
- Subgenus: Sepia
- Species: S. hierredda

Binomial name
- Sepia hierredda Rang in Férussac & d'Orbigny, 1835

Synonyms
- Acanthosepion goreense Rochebrune, 1884; Acanthosepion oculifera Rochebrune, 1884

= Sepia hierredda =

Species of cuttlefish

Sepia hierredda, the giant African cuttlefish, is a species of cuttlefish from the family Sepiidae, which was previously considered conspecific with the common cuttlefish Sepia officinalis. It is found along the western coast of Africa and is an important species to fisheries.

== Description ==
Sepia hierredda is very similar to the common cuttlefish but there are a number of consistent morphological differences which can be used to identify S. hieredda from S. officinalis, the two species being sympatric off northwestern Africa. The colour pattern shown by S. hierredda is very similar to that of S. officinalis. The morphological features that distinguishing this species from the common cuttlefish are that in S.hierraedda the number of transverse rows of suckers is higher, for specimens of similar mantle lengths, the striated zone on the cuttlebone of common cuttlefish from the northeastern Atlantic is shorter than the same feature in S. hierredda, however, in common cuttlefish from the Canary Islands this character is not useful because the striated zone is the same length as it is in this species, the mantle of S. hierredda is narrower and the arms are shorter. Genetic differences are consistent and sampling revealed no signs of hybridisation in specimens samples off Senegal where the two species are sympatric. As its vernacular name suggests the giant African cuttlefish is a very large species which can grow to a mantle length of up to 500mm and a weight which can reach 7.5 kg.

== Distribution ==
Sepia hierredda occurs along the west coast of Africa from Cape Blanc in Mauritania south to Baia dos Tigres in Angola. It is also found around the Endeavour Bank off northwestern Africa.

== Habitat and ecology ==
Sepia hierredda starts to spawn early in the year, in February and this continues into September. They have a lifespan of 24 months. Migrations of this species have been recorded off West Africa. Females become sexually mature at a mantle length of 130mm. Where this species is sympatric with the common cuttlefish, then the giant African cuttlefish shows a strong preference for waters above 50m in depth, whereas the common cuttlefish can be found as in depths over of 100m.

== Fisheries ==
Sepia hierredda is a commercially important quarry species for fisheries off the western coast of Africa. In waters off Western Sahara and Mauritania, S. hierredda is the main species caught by Spanish trawlers.
