= Henry Seamount =

Underwater landmass in the Canary Islands

Coordinates: 27°20′N 17°46′W

Location near the Canary Islands off the northwest coast of Africa

Henry Seamount is a seamount of Cretaceous age southeast of El Hierro in the Canary Islands. It is 660 metres (2,170 ft) high above the seafloor and covered with sediments. Despite its old age, it shows evidence of recent eruptions and of hydrothermal activity in the last 3,350 years. This activity may be either mediated by groundwater flow from El Hierro or by recent eruptions of Henry Seamount.

== Geography and geomorphology ==
First identified and named in 2001, Henry Seamount is located 40 kilometres (25 mi) southeast of El Hierro, an island in the Canary Islands. The 10 kilometres (6.2 mi) wide seamount rises 660 metres (2,170 ft) above the Jurassic ocean floor at 3,650 metres (11,980 ft) depth, forming a dome. The seamount features ridges and gullies and a sharp slope break with respect to the surrounding ocean floor. The seafloor on the seamount itself is covered by sediments and pelagic ooze containing foraminifera and calcareous nannofossils has been found on the summit. There are no recognizable landslide scars. Underwater cameras have observed deposits of lapilli and volcanic ash, outcrops of basement on Henry Seamount and pale sediment, while clam shells are widespread in the summit region. Gullies and ridges are subdued but recognizable on its slopes. The surrounding ocean floor is covered with mounds and with various linear shapes and there is another volcanic seamount south of Henry Seamount while a moat north of the seamount may be a product of bottom scouring by ocean currents.

== Geology ==
Dredging has yielded basalt and trachytic rocks which contain anorthoclase and phenocrysts of amphibole, anorthoclase and titanite. Apatite, baryte and manganese crusts have also been found. The volcanic rocks resemble these from intraplate volcanoes but there are differences to the rocks erupted by El Hierro. The rocks show evidence of alteration by seawater and metasomatism; the baryte appears to have been emplaced hydrothermally.

The seamount is of Cretaceous age, with an age of 126 million years, and the thick sediment cover indicates an age of Its formation appears to be unrelated to both the Mid-Atlantic Ridge and the Canary hotspot; it may instead be related to mantle phenomena at the edge of the Northwest Africa craton and with structures of the ocean floor. There is evidence that the seamount was reactivated during the last 350,000 years, as a tephra layer found on the seamount appears to originate at Henry Seamount rather than El Hierro.

=== Hydrothermal activity ===
Henry Seamount is a rare example of a seamount that is hydrothermally active despite being an extinct volcano. The summit area is densely covered with clam deposits and structures that appear to be deposits from hydrothermal venting. Radiocarbon dating on vesicomyid clams, which occur at cold seeps and hydrothermal vents, have yielded ages of less than 3,350 years, implying recent hydrothermal activity. The chemistry of baryte blocks - which also formed through hydrothermal venting - implies that the hydrothermal fluids had a low temperature. There is some evidence of present-day hydrothermal flow at Henry Seamount.

The hydrothermal fluids do not appear to originate at Henry Seamount itself. Rather, it may be recharged at neighbouring seamounts and at El Hierro's submarine flanks and arrive at Henry Seamount through aquifers after being heated by volcanic intrusions at El Hierro. The heat from intrusions would also drive the circulation. More recent research however has identified tephra layers on Henry Seamount that may indicate recent eruptions of the volcano. In that case, remnant heat from eruptions may be responsible for the hydrothermal activity. Most tephra samples may have come from El Hierro and were transported to Henry Seamount by submarine mass movements, in particular the "Las Playas II" sector collapse at El Hierro.

== Biology ==
Henry Seamount is located within the Canary Current Large Marine Ecosystem. Deepwater corals, holothurians, red worms, starfish, gastropods and xenophyophore, a coral stem and shell fragments have also been reported. Underwater cameras have observed "graveyards" of thousands of clams on the seamount. The occurrence of Abyssogena southwardae at Henry Seamount has been reported.
