= The Paps =

Seamount in the Atlantic ocean

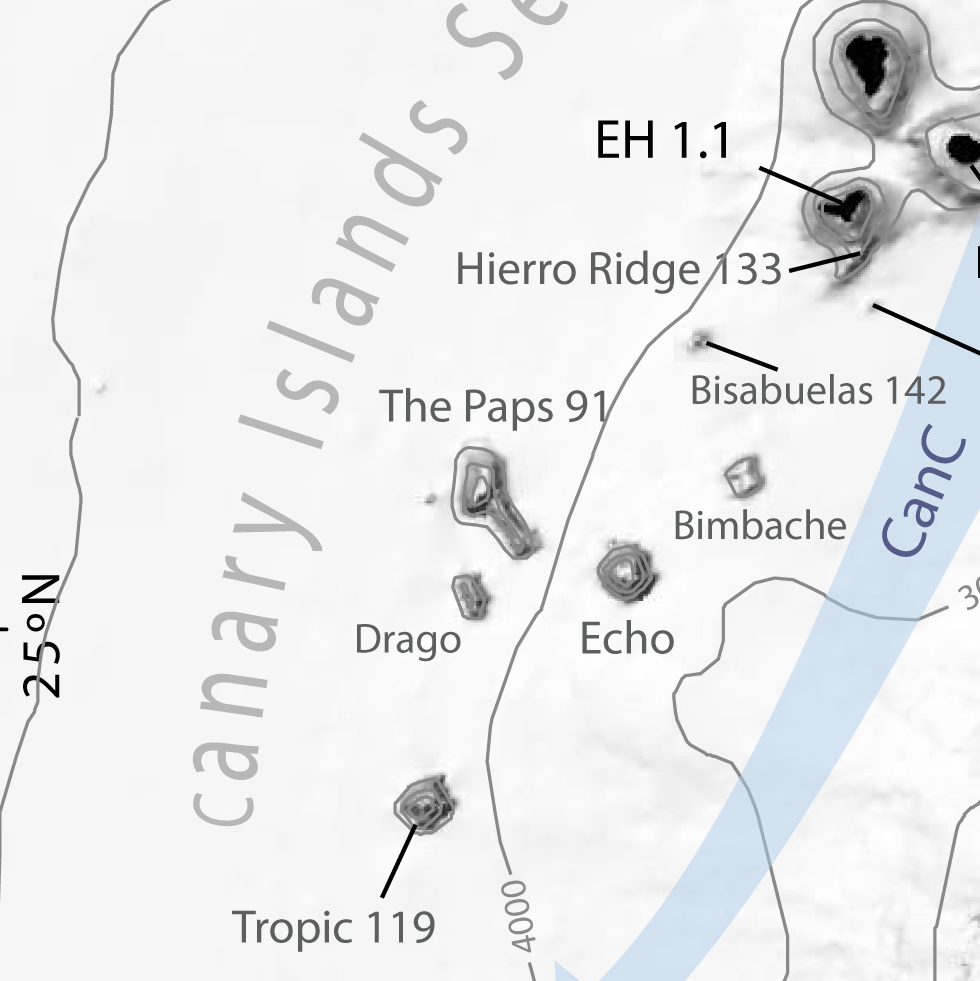
- Detail of a CISP's general bathymetric map centered on The Paps (Rivera et al. 2016).
- Summit depth: 1,600 m (5,200 ft)
- Height: 2,700 m (8,900 ft)

Location
- Location: North Atlantic
- Group: Canary Islands Seamount Province
- Coordinates: 25.92°N 20.30°W

Geology
- Age of rock: 91.1 ± 0.2 Ma

The Paps is a Cretaceous seamount of the Atlantic Ocean, located in the Canary Islands Seamount Province (CISP). Featuring an elongated shape, it has a height of 2,700 metres.

== Description ==
The seamount lies at about 25.92°N 20.30°W, about 300 km to the southwest of El Hierro. The age of the seamount has been estimated to 91.1 ± 0.2 million years. The seamount, whose top rises up to 1,600 m below sea level from a base that stands at 4,300 m below sea level, consists of a main block elongated along a N–S direction, featuring a secondary NW–SE ridge sprouting from the south east of the main edifice. It features a surface of 2,080 km^{2}.

Common features with the neighbouring Drago seamount, such an elongated shape and the presence of several small volcanic cones, suggest both seamounts may share a similar formation process.
