= Pseudolividae =

Scientific classification
- Kingdom: Animalia
- Phylum: Mollusca
- Class: Gastropoda
- Subclass: Caenogastropoda
- Order: Neogastropoda
- Superfamily: Olivoidea
- Family: Pseudolividae de Gregorio, 1880

Synonyms
- Zemiridae Iredale, 1924

Family of gastropods

Pseudolividae is a taxonomic family of medium-sized sea snails, marine gastropod mollusks in the superfamily Olivoidea.

The family name Pseudolividae is composed of the prefix "pseudo" and the word "Olividae" and thus means false olives. This refers to the fact that some of the species in this group, in particular a few of the Pseudoliva species, have shells that rather closely resemble those of the Olividae, the olives.

== Taxonomy ==
According to the taxonomy of the Gastropoda by Bouchet & Rocroi (2005) the family Pseudolividae has no subfamilies.

== Genera ==
According to the World Register of Marine Species (WoRMS), the family Pseudolividae contains the following genera :

- Luizia Douvillé, 1933
- Macron H. Adams & A. Adams, 1853: unassigned in the superfamily Buccinoidea
- † Maralsenia Pacaud, 2009
- Naudoliva Kilburn, 1989
- † Popenoeum Squires, 1989
- Pseudoliva Swainson, 1840
- † Sulcobuccinum d'Orbigny, 1850
- † Sulcoliva Vermeij, 1998
- † Testallium Vermeij & DeVries, 1997
- Triumphis Gray, 1857 (now assigned to Pisaniidae)
- Zemira H. Adams & A. Adams, 1853

Genera brought into synonymy

- † Eburnopsis Tate, 1889: synonym of Zemira H. Adams & A. Adams, 1853
- Fulmentum P. Fischer, 1884: synonym of Pseudoliva Swainson, 1840
- † Gastridium Sowerby, 1846: synonym of † Testallium Vermeij & DeVries, 1997 (junior homonym)
- Macroniscus Thiele, 1929: synonym of Macron H. Adams & A. Adams, 1853
- Mariona G. B. Sowerby III, 1890: synonym of Pseudoliva Swainson, 1840
- Sylvanocochlis Melvill, 1903: synonym of Fulmentum P. Fischer, 1884
