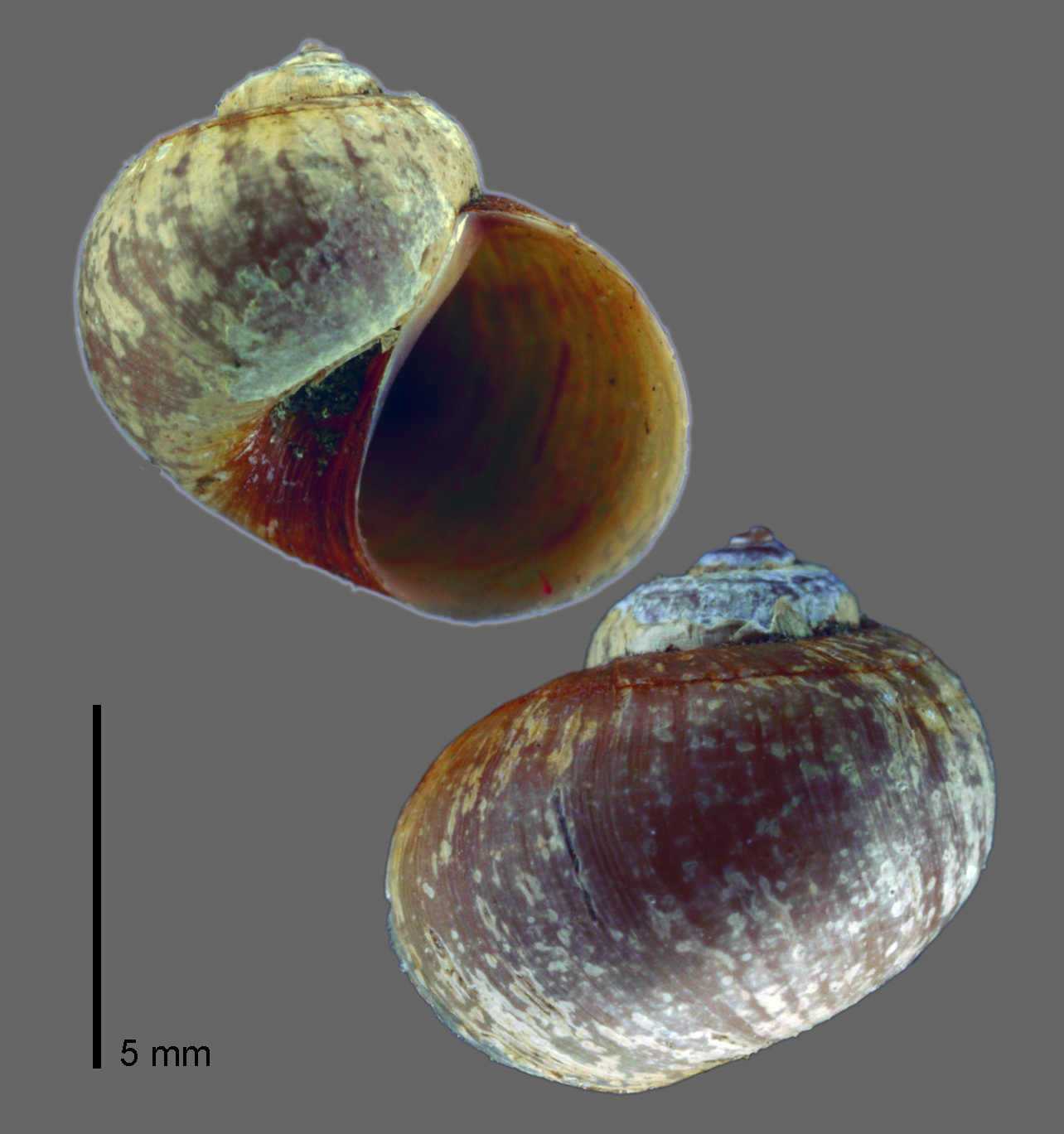
- Shell of Salinator sanchezi (specimen at MNHN, Paris)

Scientific classification
- Kingdom: Animalia
- Phylum: Mollusca
- Class: Gastropoda
- Subcohort: Panpulmonata
- Superfamily: Amphiboloidea
- Family: Amphibolidae
- Genus: Salinator; Hedley, 1900

Type species
- Ampullaria fragilis Lamarck, 1822

= Salinator =

Genus of gastropods

Salinator is a genus of small, air-breathing, terrestrial or semi-marine snails with an operculum, pulmonate gastropod molluscs in the subfamily Salinatorinae of the family Amphibolidae.

== Distribution ==
This genus occurs in Australia and South East Asia.

== Species ==
Species within the genus Salinator include:

- Salinator fragilis (Lamarck, 1822)
- † Salinator lawsae Ludbrook, 1978
- † Salinator neozelanicus Laws, 1950
- Salinator rhamphidius Golding, Ponder & Byrne, 2007
- Salinator rosaceus Golding, Ponder & Byrne, 2007
- Salinator tectus Golding, Ponder & Byrne, 2007

Taxa inquirenda

- Salinator burmanus (Blanford, 1867):
- Salinator quoyanus (Potiez & Michaud, 1838)
- Salinator sanchezi (Qadras & Möllendorf, 1894)

Synonyms

- Salinator maculatus (Mousson, 1865): synonym of Fijidoma maculata (Mousson, 1865) (new combination)
- † Salinator neozelanica Laws, 1950: synonym of † Salinator neozelanicus Laws, 1950 (incorrect gender of species epithet)
- Salinator rhamphidia Golding, Ponder & Byrne, 2007: synonym of Salinator rhamphidius Golding, Ponder & Byrne, 2007 (incorrect gender of species epithet)
- Salinator rosacea Golding, Ponder & Byrne, 2007: synonym of Salinator rosaceus Golding, Ponder & Byrne, 2007
- Salinator solida (Martens, 1878): synonym for Phallomedusa solida (Martens, 1878)
- Salinator solidus (Martens, 1878): synonym of Phallomedusa solida (Martens, 1878)
- Salinator swatowensis Yen, 1939: synonym of Naranjia swatowensis (Yen, 1939)
- Salinator takii Kuroda, 1928:synonym for Lactiforis takii (Kuroda, 1928)
- Salinator tecta Golding, Ponder & Byrne, 2007: synonym of Salinator tectus Golding, Ponder & Byrne, 2007 (incorrect gender of species epithet)

In 2007, Golding, Ponder, and Byrne suggested that Salinator takii be moved into the newly erected genus Lactiforis, and that Salinator solidus be moved into the newly erected genus Phallomedusa, in a separate family called Phallomedusidae.
