= O. fragilis =

O. fragilis may refer to:

- Omphalotropis fragilis, a gastropod species endemic to Micronesia
- Ophiothrix fragilis, an echinoderm species in the genus Ophiothrix
- Opuntia fragilis, the brittle prickly pear or little prickly pear, a cactus species native to much of North America

== See also ==
- Fragilis (disambiguation)
