= A. fragilis =

A. fragilis may refer to:

- Acronicta fragilis, the fragile dagger moth, a moth species found from Newfoundland to Florida
- Actinodaphne fragilis, a plant species endemic to Malaysia
- Aglaia fragilis, a plant species endemic to Fiji
- Allosaurus fragilis, a large theropod dinosaur species that lived 155 to 145 million years ago during the late Jurassic period
- Anguis fragilis, the slowworm or blindworm, a limbless reptile species native to Eurasia
- Apogon fragilis, a cardinalfish from the Indo-West Pacific
- Argonauta fragilis, a pelagic octopus species
- Ascobulla fragilis, a sea snail species
- Atalacmea fragilis, a sea snail species
- Atrina fragilis, the fan mussel, a large saltwater clam or marine bivalve mollusc species

== See also ==
- Fragilis (disambiguation)
