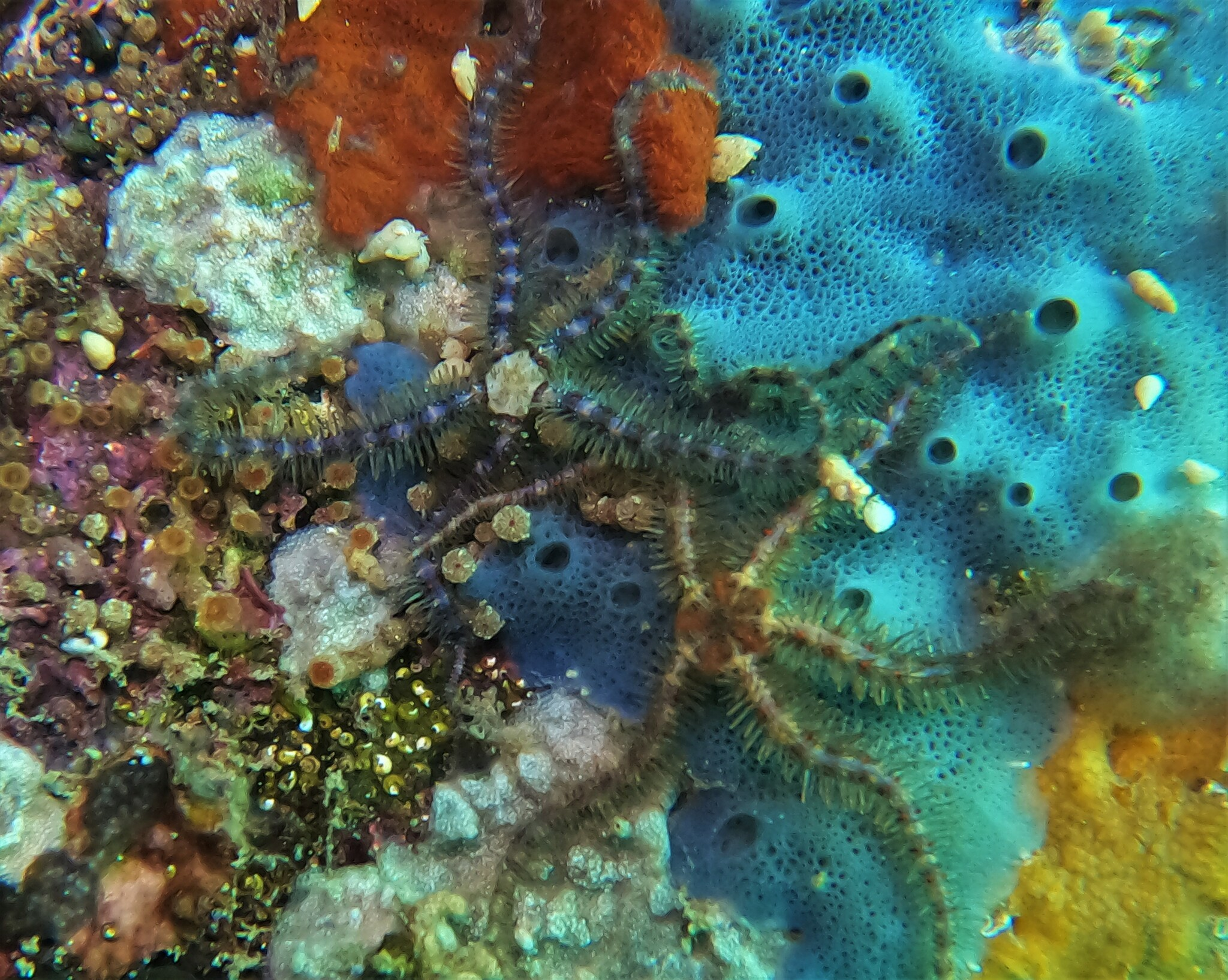
- Colima, Mexico, 2023

Scientific classification
- Domain: Eukaryota
- Kingdom: Animalia
- Phylum: Echinodermata
- Class: Ophiuroidea
- Order: Ophiurida
- Family: Ophiotrichidae
- Genus: Ophiothrix
- Species: O. spiculata

Binomial name
- Ophiothrix spiculata (LeConte, 1851)

= Ophiothrix spiculata =

Species of brittle star

Ophiothrix spiculata, the western spiny brittle star, is a species of marine invertebrate in the order Ophiurida. It is found along the Pacific coast of North and South America from below the San Francisco Bay to Peru. Individuals come in a variety of colors, although usually with orange longitudinal stripes on the arms, and the body can measure up to 2 cm across. This species was first described by J. L. Le Conte in 1851.
