= Phallomedusa austrina =

Scientific classification
- Kingdom: Animalia
- Phylum: Mollusca
- Class: Gastropoda
- Family: Amphibolidae
- Genus: Phallomedusa
- Species: P. austrina

Binomial name
- Phallomedusa austrina Golding, Ponder & Byrne, 2007

Species of gastropod

Phallomedusa austrina is a species of small, air-breathing land snail with an operculum, a pulmonate gastropod mollusc.

== Distribution ==
Australia.
