= A. pentaphylla =

A. pentaphylla may refer to:

- Adesmia pentaphylla, a flowering plant
- Asterias pentaphylla, a brittle star
