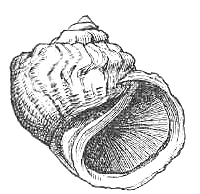
- A drawing of the shell and operculum of Amphibola crenata

Scientific classification
- Kingdom: Animalia
- Phylum: Mollusca
- Class: Gastropoda
- Subcohort: Panpulmonata
- Superfamily: Amphiboloidea; J. E. Gray, 1840

Families
- Amphibolidae; Maningrididae

Diversity
- 15 species

= Amphiboloidea =

Superfamily of gastropods

Amphiboloidea is a taxonomic superfamily of air-breathing land snails.

== Distribution ==
Amphibolids are found in Indo-Pacific intertidal mangrove, saltmarsh and estuarine mudflat habitats.

== Taxonomy ==
=== 2005 taxonomy ===
According to the taxonomy of the Gastropoda (Bouchet & Rocroi, 2005), it is a superfamily in the informal group Basommatophora, within the Pulmonata.

This superfamily has contained only one family, the Amphibolidae.

=== 2007 taxonomy ===
Golding et al. (2007) have established new families:

- Maningrididae Golding, Ponder & Byrne, 2007 - with the only species Maningrida arnhemensis
- Phallomedusidae Golding, Ponder & Byrne, 2007

=== 2010 taxonomy ===
Basommatophora (Siphonarioidea and Amphiboloidea and Hygrophila) have been found polyphyletic and so Jörger et al. (2010) have moved Amphiboloidea to Panpulmonata.
