= P. fragilis =

P. fragilis may refer to:

- Pentachaeta gracilis, a plant species in the genus Pentachaeta endemic to California
- Polysiphonia fragilis, a red alga species
- Phreatogammarus fragilis, an amphipod species found only in New Zealand's South Island

== Synonyms ==
- Pleurothallis fragilis, a synonym for Acianthera luteola, an orchid species

== See also ==
- Fragilis (disambiguation)
