= Mary Wilcox (disambiguation) =

Mary Wilcox may refer to:

- Mary Charlotte Wilcox (born 1947), Canadian retired actress and minister
- Mary Theodora Wilcox, birth name of Dora Wilcox (1873–1953), New Zealand-born Australian poet and playwright
- Mary Wilcox Silver, American oceanographer and professor emerita
- Mary Alice Willcox (1856–1953), American zoologist and professor
