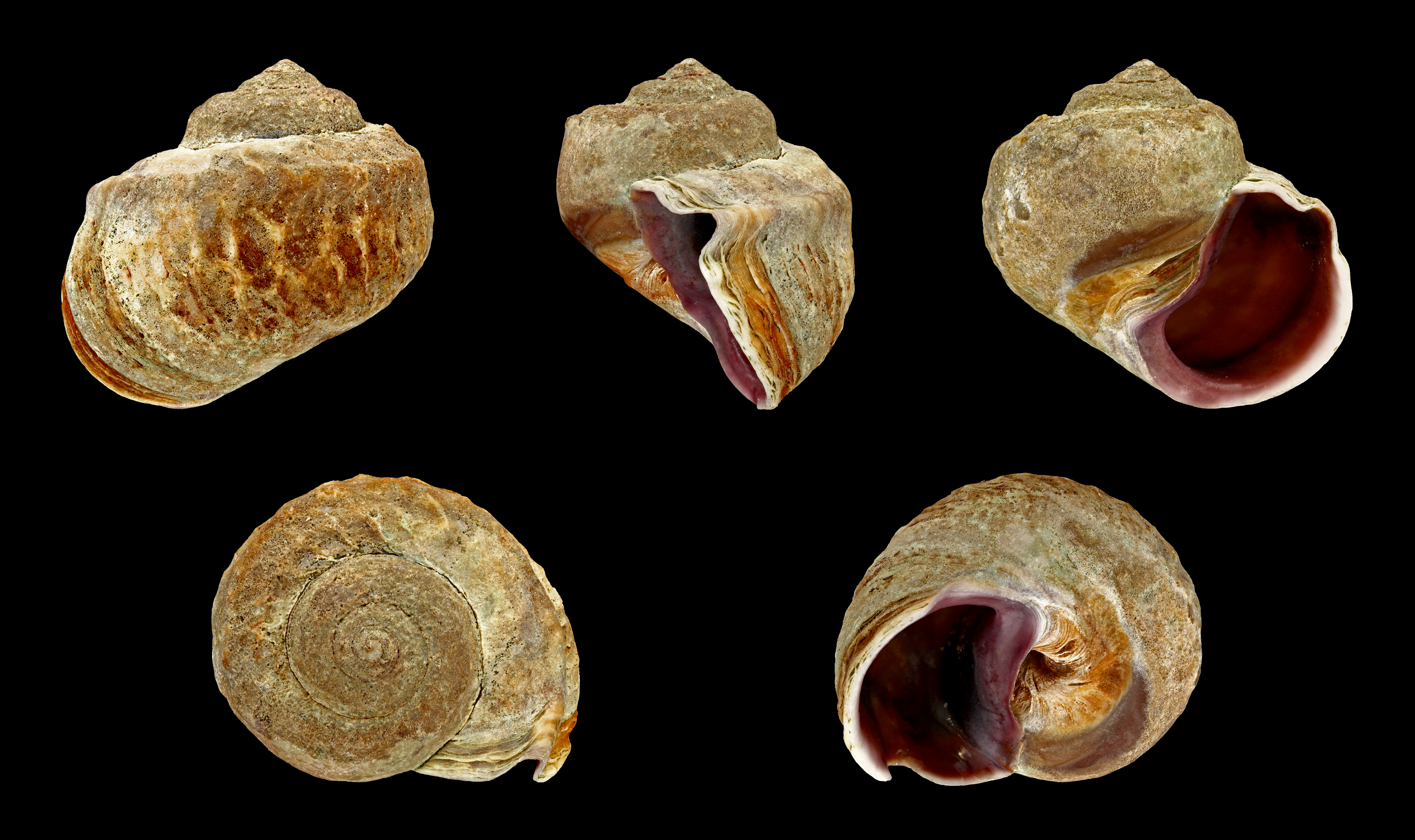
- Amphibola crenata

Scientific classification
- Kingdom: Animalia
- Phylum: Mollusca
- Class: Gastropoda
- Family: Amphibolidae
- Genus: Amphibola; Schumacher, 1817

Type species
- Amphibola australis Schumacher, 1817

Species
- See text

Synonyms
- Ampullacera Quoy & Gaimard, 1832; Thallicera Swainson, 1840 (Unnecessary substitute name for Ampullacera)

= Amphibola =

Genus of gastropods

Amphibola is a genus of small, air-breathing terrestrial or semi-marine snails with an operculum, pulmonate gastropod molluscs in the family Amphibolidae.

== Species ==
Species within the genus Amphibola include:

- Amphibola africana (E. A. Smith, 1904)
- Amphibola crenata (Gmelin, 1791)

Species brought into synonymy

- Amphibola australis Schumacher, 1817: synonym of Amphibola crenata (Gmelin, 1791)
- Amphibola avellana (Bruguière, 1789): synonym of Amphibola crenata (Gmelin, 1791)
- Amphibola burmana Blanford, 1867: synonym of Salinator burmana (Blanford, 1867)
- Amphibola crenata (Martyn, 1786): synonym of Amphibola crenata (Gmelin, 1791)
- Amphibola obvoluta Jonas, 1846: synonym of Amphibola crenata (Gmelin, 1791)
- Amphibola sanchezi Quadras & Möllendorf, 1894: synonym of Salinator sanchezi (Quadras & Möllendorf, 1894)
- Amphibola solida Martens, 1878: synonym of Phallomedusa solida (Martens, 1878)

Species inquirenda

- Amphibola quadrasi Möllendorf, 1894
