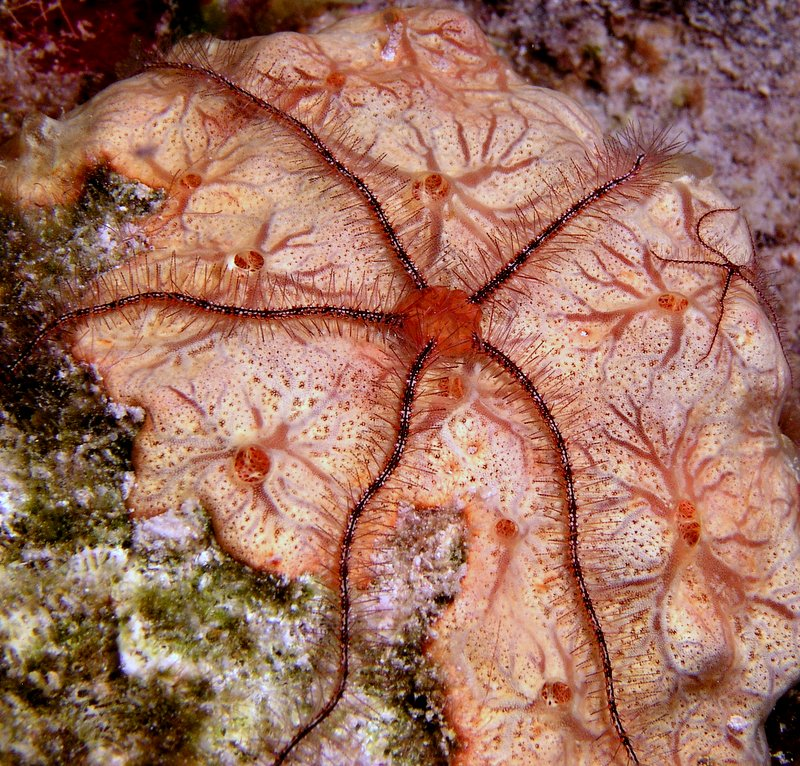

Scientific classification
- Kingdom: Animalia
- Phylum: Echinodermata
- Class: Ophiuroidea
- Order: Amphilepidida
- Family: Ophiotrichidae
- Genus: Ophiothrix
- Species: O. suensoni

Binomial name
- Ophiothrix suensoni Lütken, 1856

Synonyms
- Ophiothrix suensonii Lütken, 1856

= Ophiothrix suensoni =

Species of brittle star

Ophiothrix suensoni, Suenson's brittle star or the sponge brittle star, is a species of marine invertebrate in the order Ophiurida. It is found in the Caribbean Sea and Gulf of Mexico. It is included in the subgenus Acanthophiothrix making its full scientific name Ophiothrix (Acanthophiothrix) suensoni.

== Description ==
Ophiothrix suensoni has a small central disc which is clearly demarcated from the five long thin arms. The arms can be up to 12 centimetres (4.7 in) long and the disc 2 centimetres (0.79 in) in diameter. The aboral (upper) surface of the disc is covered with scales which are ornamented with long spines. The arms are cylindrical in cross section and the surface of the lateral scales bear long, sharp, transparent spines. There is a purple, deep red or black stripe running the length of the aboral surface of each arm. The colour of this brittle star is variable, being pale mauve, pink, yellow or red, and often the arms are a different hue from the disc.

== Distribution and habitat ==
Ophiothrix suensoni is a common species throughout the Caribbean Sea and Gulf of Mexico from Bermuda and Florida south to Venezuela and Brazil. It is found at depths ranging from 3 to 450 metres (9.8 to 1,476.4 ft). It is always associated with sponges such as the red tree sponge (Haliclona compressa), soft corals or gorgonians.

== Biology ==
Ophiothrix suensoni is a detritivore and suspension feeder. It hides during the day and emerges at night to feed. It climbs to a high point on its host sponge or sea rod and extends some of its arms to catch plankton and suspended particles floating past. It also feeds on the organic film that is found on the surface of its host.

Ophiothrix suensoni is dioecious. Breeding takes place all year round but peaks in the late summer and autumn. The males have larger gonads than the females perhaps in order to increase the concentration of sperm in the vicinity of females as they do not synchronize their spawning.
