= H. fragilis =

H. fragilis may refer to:

- Halimeda fragilis, a green macroalga species
- Hechtia fragilis, a plant species endemic to Mexico

== Synonyms ==
- Humboldtia fragilis, a synonym for Acianthera luteola, an orchid species

== See also ==
- Fragilis (disambiguation)
