= S. fragilis =

S. fragilis may refer to:

- Salinator fragilis, an air-breathing land snail species
- Salix euxina, a non-hybrid species
- Salix × fragilis, the hybrid between Salix euxina and Salix alba
- Sinocoelurus fragilis, a theropod dinosaur species from the Upper Jurassic
- Skania fragilis, a fossil arthropod species from the Cambrian
- Swainsona fragilis, a flowering plant species in the genus Swainsona native to Australasia

== See also ==
- Fragilis (disambiguation)
