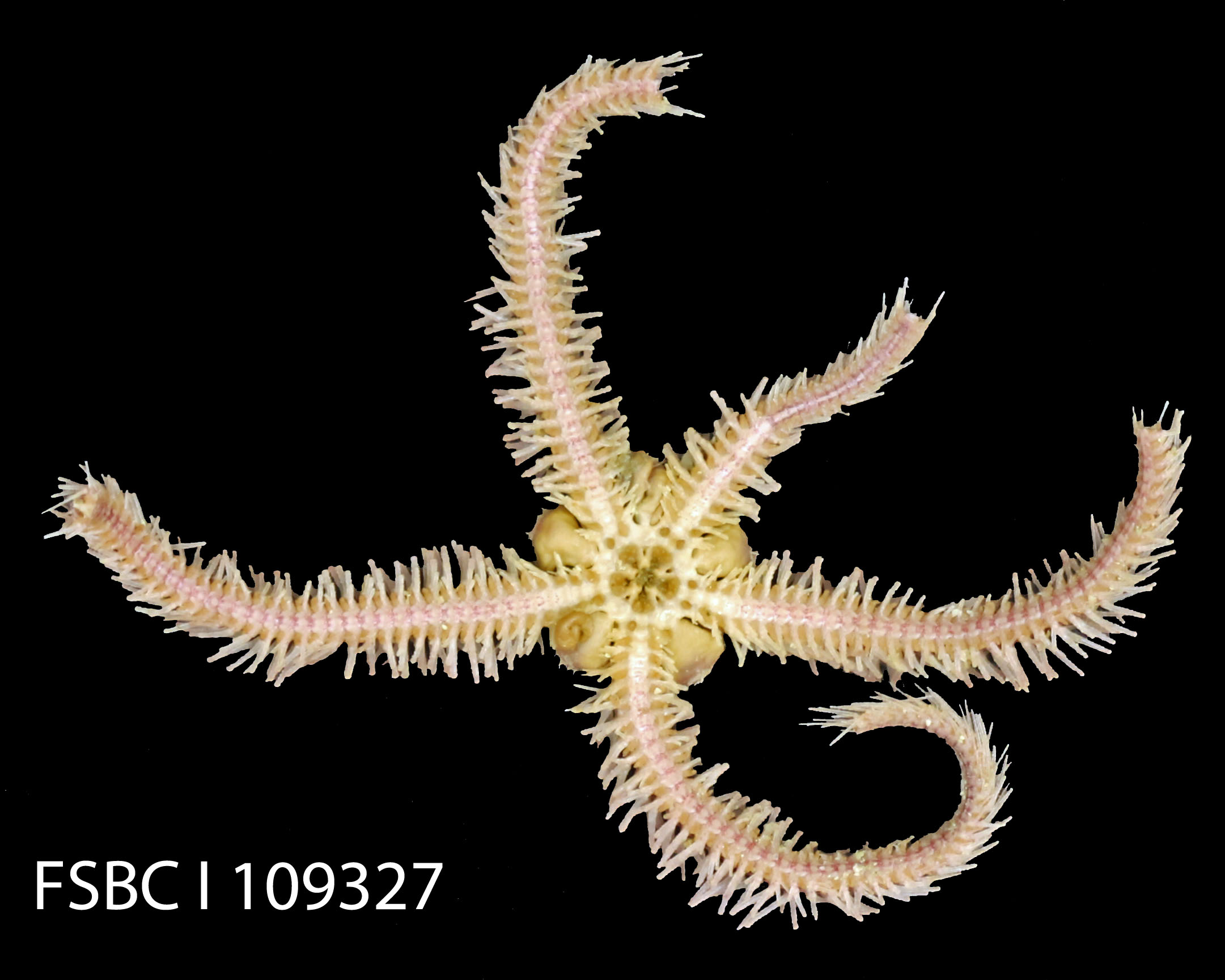

Scientific classification
- Kingdom: Animalia
- Phylum: Echinodermata
- Class: Ophiuroidea
- Order: Ophiurida
- Family: Ophiotrichidae
- Genus: Ophiothrix
- Species: O. angulata

Binomial name
- Ophiothrix angulata (Say, 1825)

Synonyms
- Ophiothrix hispida Ayres, 1854; Ophiura angulata Say, 1825

= Ophiothrix angulata =

Species of brittle star

Ophiothrix angulata, the angular brittle star, is a species of marine invertebrate in the order Ophiurida. It is found in the warm waters of the western Atlantic Ocean, the Caribbean Sea and the Gulf of Mexico.

== Description ==
Like other brittle stars, O. angulata has a central disc and five slender, unbranched, jointed arms; the spines on the arms are twice as long as the arms are wide. It is somewhat variable in appearance and difficult to distinguish from other species of brittle star occurring in the same localities. The colour also varies, but populations in Florida are often reddish-orange, with a longitudinal white line along the upper surface of the arms. This brittle star grows to a disc diameter of about 10 mm (0.4 in).

== Distribution and habitat ==
O. angulata occurs in the western Atlantic Ocean, the Caribbean Sea and the Gulf of Mexico. Its range extends from North Carolina southwards to Brazil and its depth range from subtidal to 200 m (660 ft). Its typical habitat is on reef rubble, where it lives among bivalve molluscs, sponges and algae. Young individuals are found particularly in association with the calcified green alga Halimeda.

== Biology ==
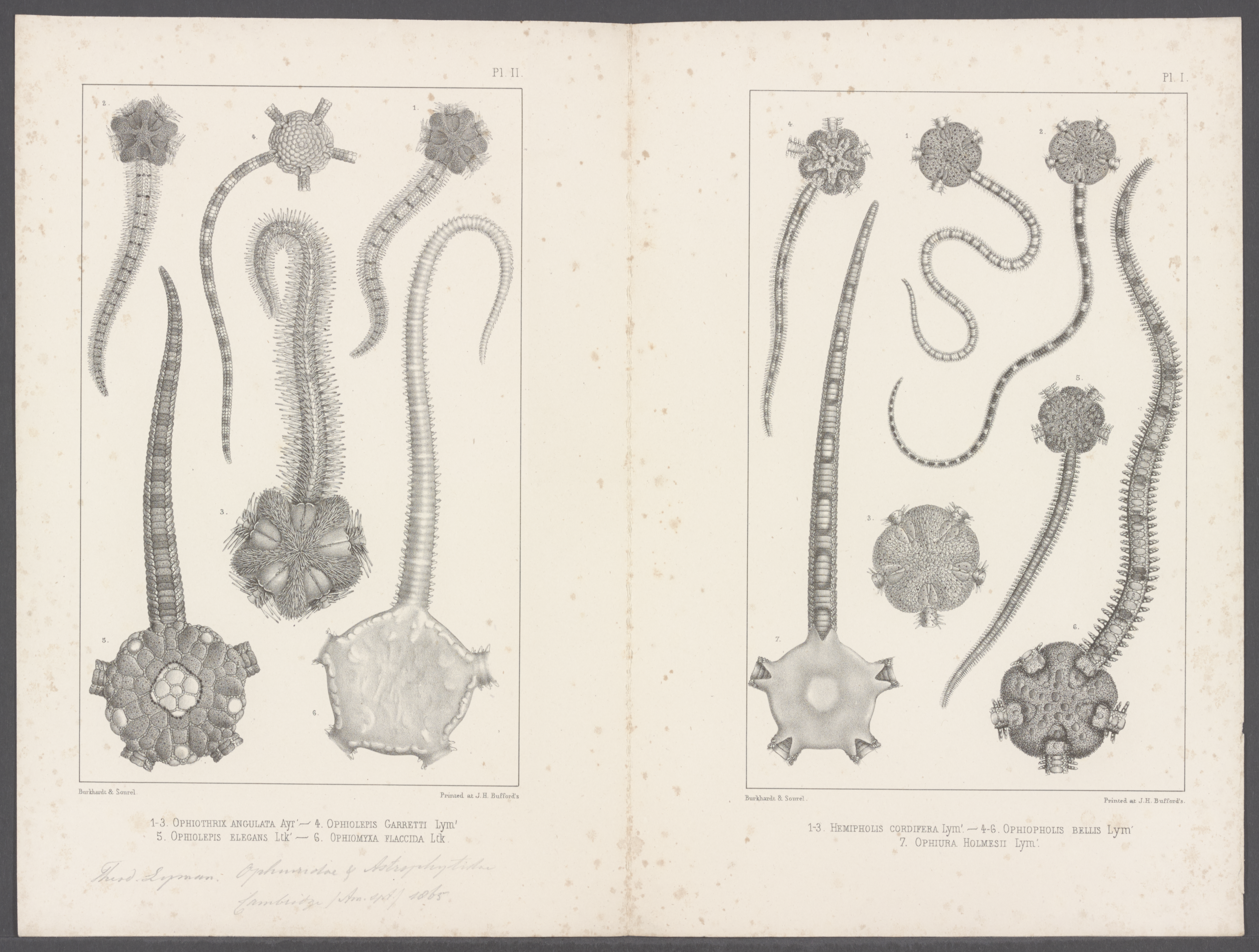
Ophiothrix angulata (Fig. 1-3) in Iconographia Zoologica, a 19th-century collection of zoological images.

O. angulata is a filter feeder and detritivore, spreading its arms widely to intercept phytoplankton and detritus drifting past. The particles are trapped by strands of mucus which dangle from the arms, and passed to the mouth by the tube feet. If an arm is damaged or lost by predation, it can be regenerated.

The reproduction of this species has been little studied, but it is thought that breeding takes place by releasing gametes into the sea in response to variations in environmental cues such as changes in temperature. This brittle star forms large aggregations before spawning takes place.

After settling, juveniles of this species are able to become planktonic again, enabling them to disperse more widely and finally settle in a more suitable location.
