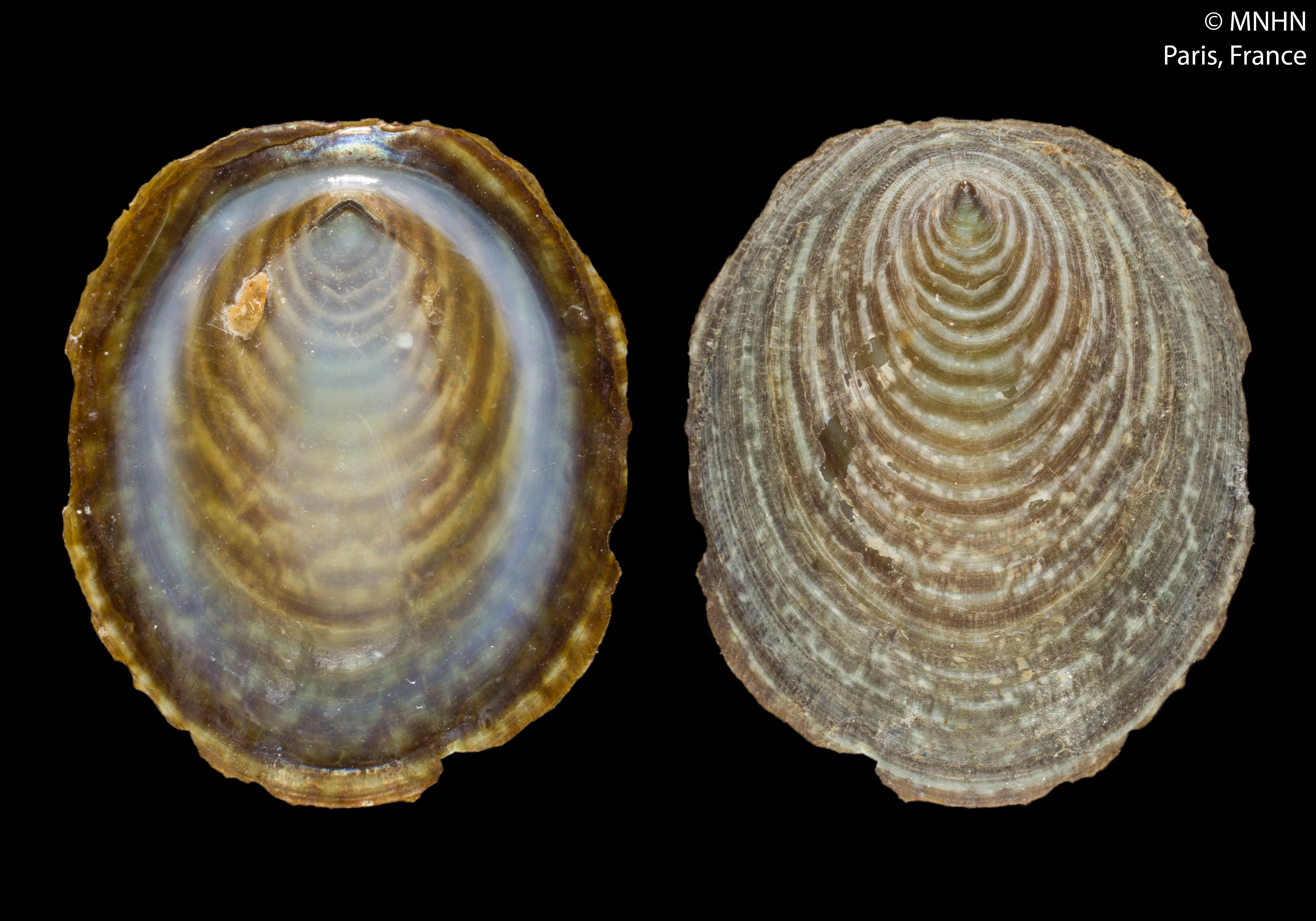
- Shell of Atalacmea fragilis

Scientific classification
- Kingdom: Animalia
- Phylum: Mollusca
- Class: Gastropoda
- Subclass: Patellogastropoda
- Superfamily: Lottioidea
- Family: Lottiidae
- Genus: Atalacmea; Iredale, 1915

Type species
- Patella unguisalmae Lesson, 1830

Species
- See text

= Atalacmea =

Genus of gastropods

Atalacmea is a genus of sea snails or true limpets, marine gastropod molluscs in the family Lottiidae, one of the families of true limpets.

== Species ==
Species within the genus Atalacmea include:

- Atalacmea elata Marwick, 1928 †
- Atalacmea fragilis (G.B. Sowerby I, 1823)
- Atalacmea multilinea Powell, 1934
