= T. fragilis =

T. fragilis may refer to:

- Tipula fragilis, Loew, 1863, a crane fly species in the genus Tipula
- Toxorhina fragilis, T. Loew, 1851, a crane fly species in the genus Toxorhina
- Trigonostemon fragilis, a plant species endemic to Vietnam

== Synonyms ==
- Tornus fragilis, a synonym for Rugulina fragilis, a gastropod species

== See also ==
- Fragilis (disambiguation)
