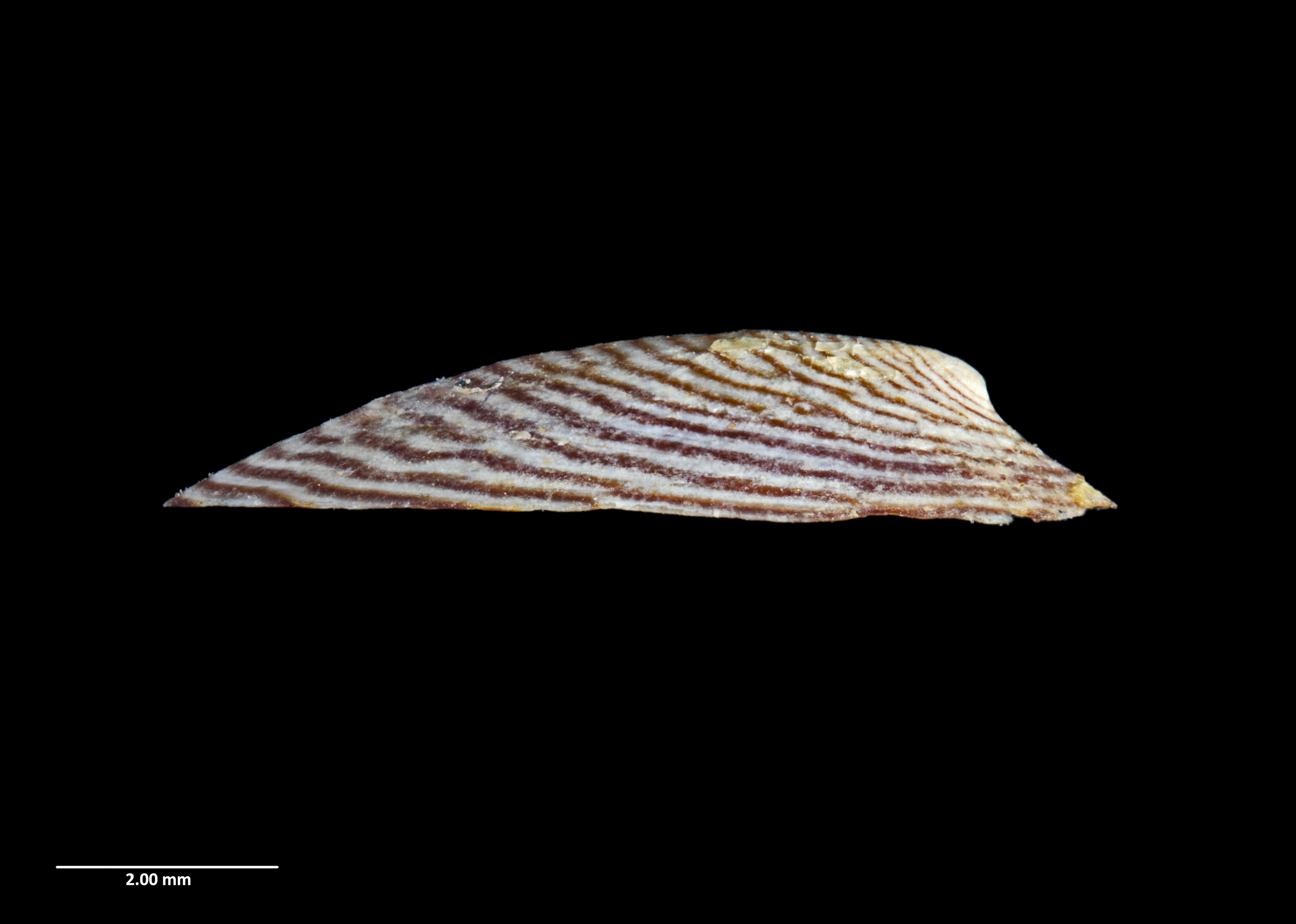

Scientific classification
- Kingdom: Animalia
- Phylum: Mollusca
- Class: Gastropoda
- Subclass: Patellogastropoda
- Family: Lottiidae
- Genus: Atalacmea
- Species: A. multilinea

Binomial name
- Atalacmea multilinea Powell, 1934

= Atalacmea multilinea =

Species of gastropod

Atalacmea multilinea is a species of sea snail or true limpet, a marine gastropod mollusc in the family Lottiidae, one of the families of true limpets.

== Distribution ==
This marine species is endemic to New Zealand.
