= C. fragilis =

C. fragilis may refer to:

- Campodea fragilis, a diplura arthropod species in the genus Campodea
- Chickcharnea fragilis, a sea snail species
- Chingkankousaurus fragilis, a theropod dinosaur species from the late Cretaceous Period
- Citharichthys fragilis, the gulf sanddab, a fish species native to the eastern Pacific Ocean
- Coelurus fragilis, a dinosaur species from the Late Jurassic period
- Cystopteris fragilis, the brittle bladderfern or common fragile fern, a fern species

== See also ==
- Fragilis (disambiguation)
