= Atalacmea elata =

Scientific classification
- Kingdom: Animalia
- Phylum: Mollusca
- Class: Gastropoda
- Subclass: Patellogastropoda
- Family: Lottiidae
- Genus: Atalacmea
- Species: †A. elata

Binomial name
- †Atalacmea elata Marwick, 1928

Species of gastropod

Atalacmea elata is an extinct species of sea snail or true limpet, a marine gastropod mollusc in the family Lottiidae, one of the families of true limpets.

== Distribution ==
This extinct marine species was endemic to New Zealand.
