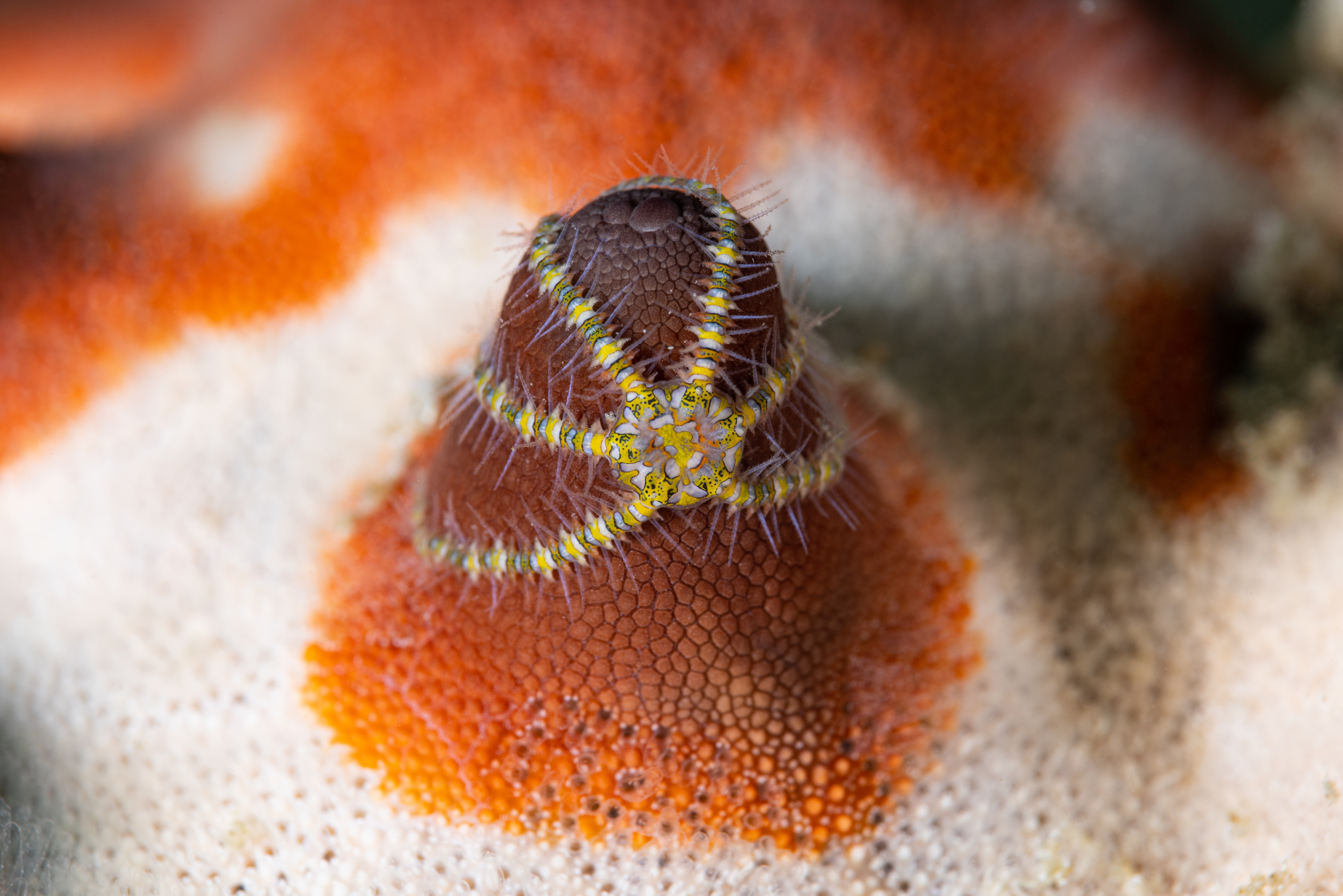
- Ophiothela mirabilis on a horned sea star in Philippines

Scientific classification
- Kingdom: Animalia
- Phylum: Echinodermata
- Class: Ophiuroidea
- Order: Amphilepidida
- Family: Ophiotrichidae
- Genus: Ophiothela
- Species: O. mirabilis

Binomial name
- Ophiothela mirabilis (Verrill, 1867)

= Ophiothela mirabilis =

Species of echinoderm

Ophiothela mirabilis is a species of ophiuroid brittle star within the family Ophiotrichidae. O. mirabilis is an epizoic species which have a non-parasitic relationship with host sponges or gorgonians. Although native to the Pacific Ocean, it has invaded the Caribbean and southwestern Atlantic since late 2000. Many of its characteristics, including reproduction and diet, allow O. mirabilis opportunities to quickly propagate and spread through habitats.

== Characteristics ==
Ophiothela mirabilis is a very minute brittle star, which rarely reaches more than 1 cm including arms. It has in general 6 arms, however because of its mode of reproduction by division (scissiparity), its shape is often very irregular (one half more developed than the other, only 4 or 5 arms, or on the contrary 7 or 8...).

Its coloration is extremely variable and made believe for a long time in a complex of several species: it can thus be orange plain or white mottled with bright colors (in particular yellow and blue) with ringed arms.

All have arms with delicate translucent, thorny spines. The arms are flexible in all directions. The jaws contain clusters of well-developed tooth papillae on the apex but not on the sides. There are no mouth papillae. Inside the mouth edge there is a second pair of tube feet. The dorsal surface of the disc is covered with spines and thorny towers.

The former species Ophiothela danae is now considered a junior synonym of Ophiothela mirabilis.

== Reproduction ==
Many fissiparous ophiuroid species can undergo asexual or sexual reproduction, but asexual reproduction is the prime method for most, including Ophiothela mirabilis. According to a study from the Marine Biodiversity Journal, sexual reproduction was not evident in O. mirabilis due to lack of gonads among multiple populations. They reproduce asexually through fragmentation: an organism can split into fragments and each fragment will eventually generate into fully mature individuals. Echinoderms use a specific form of fragmentation called fissiparity where some species intentionally divide through autotomy. Autotomy, also known as self-amputation, is a defensive mechanism where an organism can dissociate from a body part to escape high-stress situations, such as predation. This is helpful for species who inhabit irregular environments: hooking onto sponges or gorgonians can subject O. mirabilis to erratic movements where they may separate their disc tissues. O. mirabilis is able to regenerate a fragment into a whole organism, a whole disc with arms and organs, in less than a month. These reproductive methods allow for rapid propagation and abundance throughout an ecosystem.

== Diet ==
Ophiothela mirabilis, like most species of Ophiuroidea, has a simple digestive system with a short esophagus and a pouch-like stomach. Due to their lack of an anus, ophiuroids are selective in their nutrient uptake because they are unable to obtain nutrients from large quantities of ingested mud. Instead, their feeding strategies vary between suspension and deposit feeding. Organisms who use suspension feeding capture and ingest food particles suspended in water; those who use deposit feeding crawl along the seafloor to intake nutrients from sedimentary deposits. O. mirabilis may be able to switch between the two and alter their diet, depending on their developmental stage. Epizoic species, such as O. mirabilis, do not feed on their hosts; they can eat settled detritus, filamentous algae, or mucus from their coral colony. Habitation on a host aids suspension feeding by providing an elevated position for easier access to capture plankton with their feet and arm spines.

== Life-cycle ==
Ophiothela mirabilis has a life cycle of a typical brittle star. However, their complete life cycle has not been studied and further research needs to be conducted on the species. The brittle star typically goes through a pelagic phase suspended in the water as plankton and a benthic phase on the seafloor or attached to a substrate such as bryozoans, tunicates, sponges, or corals.

The first stage in the life cycle of Ophiothela mirabilis is the planktonic larval stage, during which the larvae are free-swimming and drift with ocean currents. According to a study, these larvae have a bilaterally symmetrical body plan and undergo significant morphological changes during their development. The larvae feed on planktonic organisms and have a ciliated band (tiny hairs) that helps them to move and capture food. This stage can last for several weeks or months, depending on environmental conditions.

Once the larvae have reached a certain size, they undergo metamorphosis and settle onto a suitable substrate, where they begin their sessile juvenile stage. The metamorphosis of brittle stars involves the breakdown of the ciliated band, the growth of tube feet and arms, and the development of a hard exoskeleton to protect the juvenile as it transitions to a sessile lifestyle. During this stage, they attach themselves to the substrate using their arms and secrete a hard exoskeleton, which protects them from predators. The juveniles are also capable of filter feeding, using their arms to catch planktonic organisms. After several months, the juveniles reach maturity and develop into fully grown adult forms, which can reproduce and continue the life cycle. The adult forms are not sessile and fully mobile.

Lastly, there is an additional developmental stage between the metamorphosis and planktonic phase called vitellaria. This stage is characterized by the presence of ciliated bands and tube feet, which help the vitellaria move around and explore the surrounding environment before settling down. Therefore, this allows the brittle star to search for a suitable place to attach itself to the seafloor and grow into an adult.

== Movement ==
Like other brittle stars, O. mirabilis uses a variety of muscles to move its arms and body. The muscles of brittle stars are arranged in a complex network, allowing for a wide range of movements such as twisting, bending, and coiling. Bending involves the curvature of the arms, while twisting involves the rotation of the arms around their longitudinal axis. Coiling is a more complex movement that involves the wrapping of the arms around a central point, such as the arm of another brittle star or a piece of substrate. These movements are controlled by a combination of muscles and skeletal elements called ossicles, which are interconnected to provide support for the arms while still allowing for flexibility and movement. Similarly, bending movements of brittle stars are controlled by a complex network of muscle fibers that run along the arms and disk. These muscle fibers are able to contract and relax to control the bending movements of the arms.

There are two types of muscles for movement observed in brittle stars: radial and longitudinal. Radial muscles run along the length of the arms and are responsible for bending the arms. The muscles of brittle stars work in a coordinated manner to produce movement. When the radial muscles contract, the arms bend. This movement is controlled by a system of nerves that runs along the arms and connects to the central nervous system. When the longitudinal muscles contract, the arms coil around a central point, such as the arm of another brittle star or a piece of substrate. Longitudinal muscles run from the base of the arms to the center of the body and are responsible for coiling and uncoiling the arms. Moreover, it has been examined that the longitudinal muscles are essential in the process of arm regeneration, having the ability to lose and regenerate its arms.

Additionally, O. mirabilis uses rowers, which is a specialized type of tube foot, for locomotion and navigation. The rowers are located along the undersides of the arms and are arranged in a single row. The rowers are covered in cilia, which beat in a coordinated fashion to generate a wave-like motion that propels the brittle star forward. It has been investigated that O. mirabilis uses a lead arm to direct its movement, being able to choose which arm to use as the lead arm, depending on the direction it wants to move. The lead arm is responsible for initiating the rowing motion, while the other arms coordinately follow.

Overall, Ophiothela mirabilis is a highly mobile species of brittle star that uses a combination of bending, twisting, coiling, and rowing to move and respond to changes in its environment. Its movements are coordinated by a network of muscles that allow for a wide range of motions. However, further research is needed to fully understand the movement and behavior of Ophiothela mirabilis.

== Geographical distribution ==
Ophiothela mirabilis is found at latitudes between 33° South and 38° North. O. Miralibis are native to 3 marine realms: the Tropical Eastern Pacific, Temperate North Pacific, and East Indo-Pacific. Recently, invasive O. Mirabilis have been observed in two additional marine realms: the Tropical Atlantic and Temperate South American. The first observed occurrence of O. Miralibis in the Atlantic Ocean was reported off the coast of Rio De Janeiro, Brazil in 2000. Shipping activity is cited as the most likely cause of invasive O. Mirabilis presence due to their high presence in proximity to ports. Non-Native populations also exhibit increased survivability compared to native populations, likely due harsh conditions and increased competition during transport. More research is needed as to current O. Mirabilis population data and to future expansion potential.

== Habitat ==
Ophiothela mirabilis are found on host organisms in shallow waters. They do not always stay with their original host for extended periods of time; they may leave their host to find another. The species most frequently and densely colonized by O. Mirabilis are Octocorals, however O. Mirabilis is known to colonize over 20 species, including Sea Sponges, Cnidarians, Bryozoans, Sea Urchins, and Algae. O. Mirabilis require appropriate aquatic conditions to inhabit an environment, including a mean calcite concentration of 0.53 × 10−4 to 0.051 mol.m−3, a mean surface sea temperature of over 20.23 °C, a Chlorophyll concentration from 0.004 to 1.64 mg/m^{3}, and a mean water pH level over 7.64.

== Gallery ==
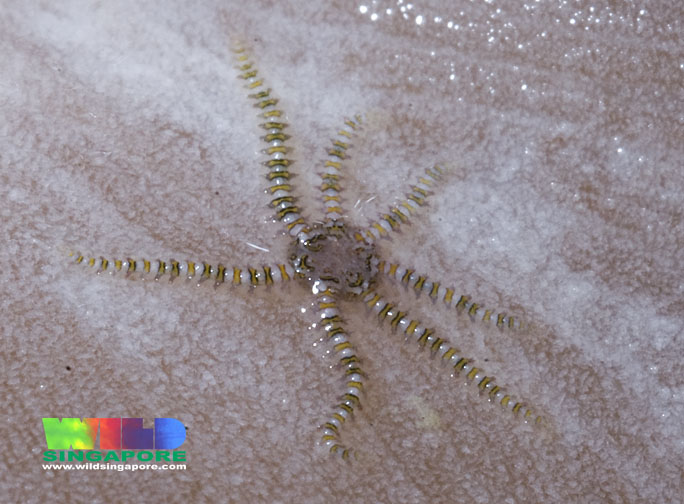
With 7 arms

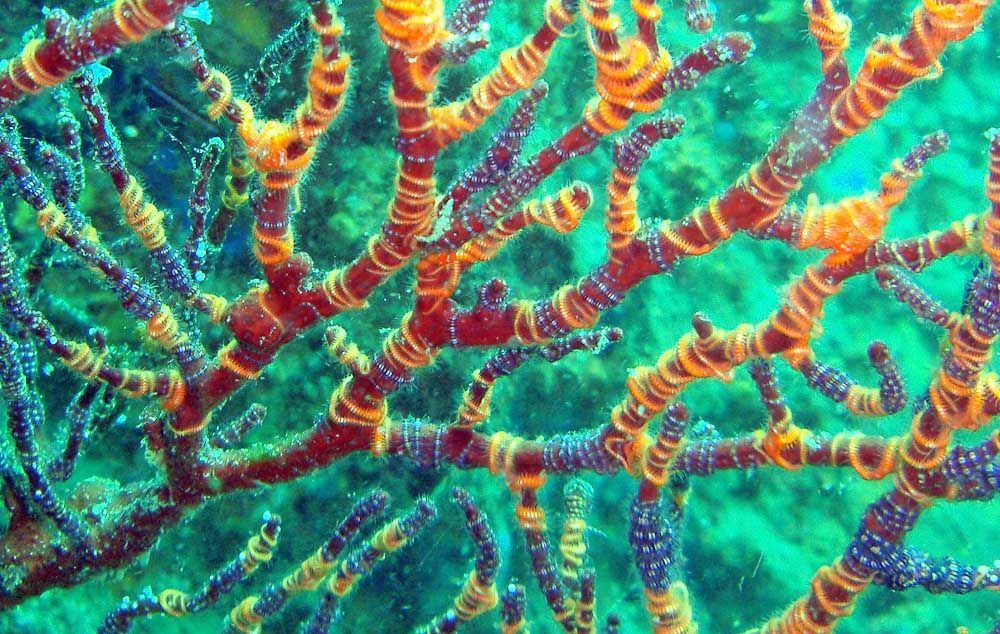
Wrapped by dozens around a gorgonian

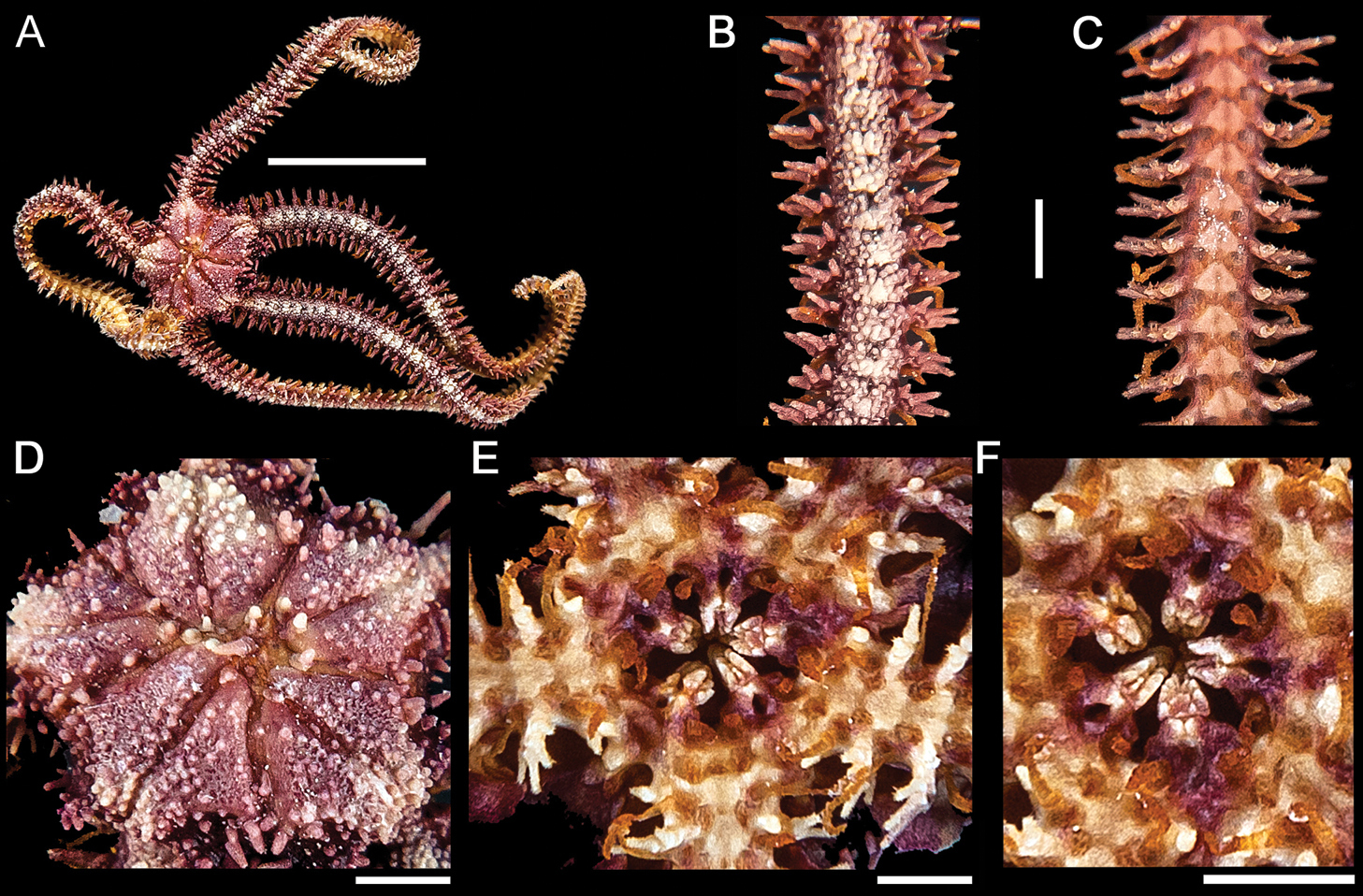
Preserved specimen

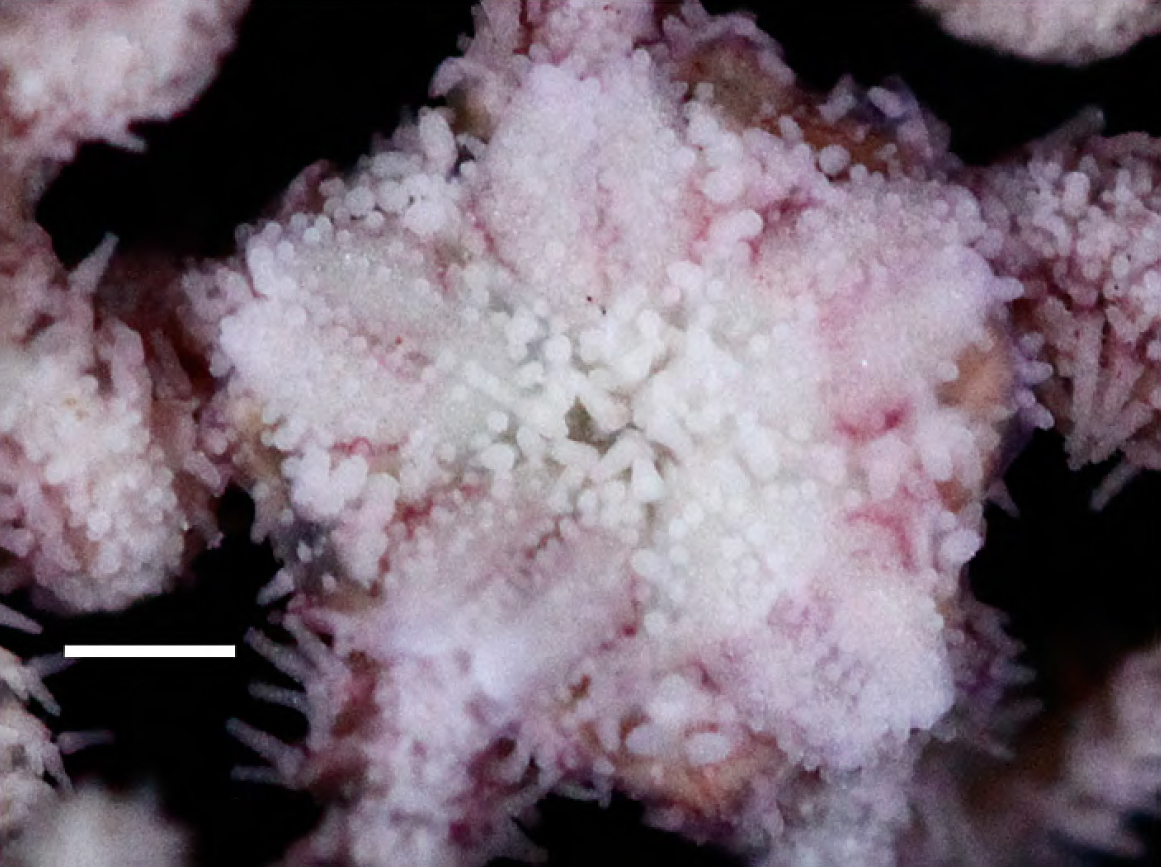
