= Mary Alice Willcox =

American zoologist

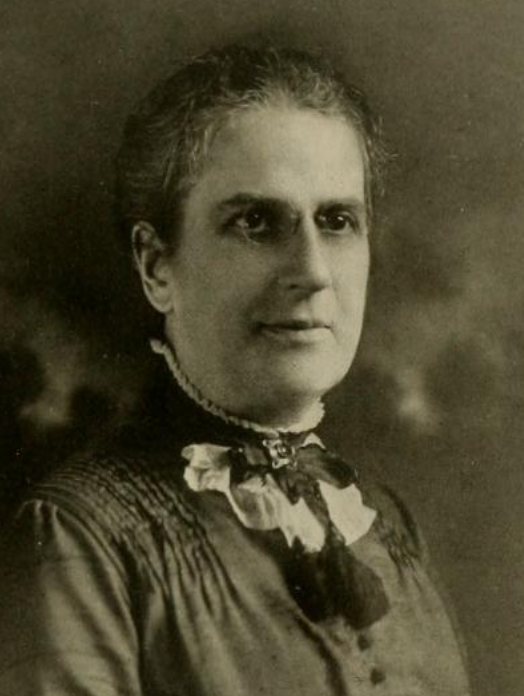
- Mary Alice Willcox, from a 1915 yearbook
- Born: April 24, 1856; Kennebunk, Maine
- Died: June 4, 1953 (aged 97); Pocasset, Massachusetts
- Education: Newnham College, Cambridge; University of Zurich
- Scientific career
- Fields: Ornithology; Malacology
- Institutions: Wellesley College

Mary Alice Willcox (April 24, 1856 – June 4, 1953) was an American zoologist and professor at Wellesley College.

== Early life and education ==
In 1856, Mary was born in Kennebunk, Maine, the eldest of three children of the congregational minister William H. Willcox and his wife Annie Holmes née Goodenow. Theirs was a distinguished family in Maine; her great grandfather, John Holmes, was one of the state's first senators, while her grandfather, Daniel Goodenow, was a justice of the Supreme Court of Maine. Her brother, Walter Francis Willcox, became a professor of economics and statistics at Cornell University.

Soon after her birth, the family moved to Reading, Massachusetts, where Mary studied at Salem State Normal School in 1875. She taught at the Frederick Female Seminary in Maryland, 1875–1876, and Charlestown High School in Boston, 1876–1878. During the summers of 1877 and 1878, she attended the marine laboratory of Alexander Agassiz. She studied at the Massachusetts Institute of Technology and the Boston Society of Natural History from 1878 to 1880.

For her undergraduate education, in 1880 Willcox traveled to England and studied at Newnham College. She completed her studies in 1883, but, at the time, Cambridge University did not grant degrees to women.

== Career ==
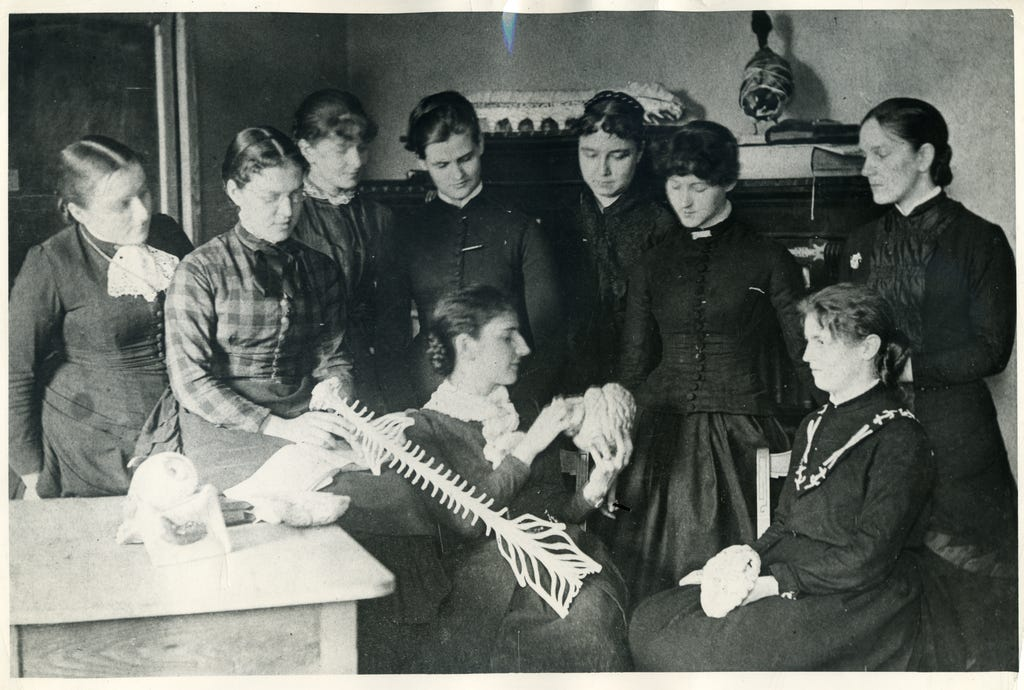
Teaching in 1883

With the help of her father, Willcox gained a position in the zoology department at Wellesley College in Massachusetts. Her mother, however, regretted the decision since it meant "giving up all possibilities of marriage". Very little in the way of zoological course work had been developed at Wellesley to that point, and Willcox had the task of essentially building a zoology department from scratch. She introduced a number of innovative teaching methods. For a time, her department became one of the foremost in the country, attracting a number of women who would become productive zoologists. Her interest during this period was in ornithology, and in 1895 she published Pocket Guide to the Common Land Birds of New England.

To improve her job security at Wellesley, in 1896 Willcox took a leave of absence to study for a Ph.D. at the University of Zurich. In 1898 she was at the Naples Zoological Station. She completed her degree program in 1898 with a dissertation On the Anatomy of Acmaea fragilis (Chemnitz), and was allowed to return to her position at Wellesley as head of the department. Much of her research at the college was on comparative anatomy of molluscs, a phylum of invertebrate animals, and of Acmaeidae, a family of sea snails. She authored a number of scientific papers in zoological publications. Her last paper, published in 1906, was on the anatomy of Acmaea testudinalis.

Willcox retired in 1910 as professor emeritus, supposedly as a result of poor health. The exact cause is unclear, but a 1928 letter mentioned rheumatism. Following retirement she became active in the League of Women Voters, Federation of Women's Clubs, National Audubon Society, and the Boston Society of Natural History. She died at her home in Pocasset, Massachusetts, some 43 years after her retirement.

== Bibliography ==
- Pocket Guide to the Common Land Birds of New England (1895)
- Anatomy of the Grasshopper (1896)
- Anatomy of the May Beetle (1896)
- Directions for the Practical Study of the Grasshopper (1896)
- Zur Anatomie von Acmaea Fragilis Chemnitz (On the Anatomy of Acmaea Fragilis Chemnitz) (1898)
- Notes on the Occipital Region of the Trout, Trutta Fario (1899)
- On the Making of Solutions (1899)
- Hermaphroditism among the Docoglossa (1900)
- A parasitic or commensal oligochaete in New England (1901)
- Some disputed points about the anatomy of limpets (1901)
- Biology of Acmaea testudinalis Muller (1905)
- Homing of Fissurella and Siphonaria (1905)
- Anatomy of Acmaea testudinalis Muller. Part I. Introductory Material-External Anatomy (1906)
- The American Baedeker (1913)
- The Immigrant's Guide to the United States: The Little Green Book and how it is Used in the Schools (1913)
