= L. fragilis =

L. fragilis may refer to:

- Lactarius fragilis, a mushroom species
- Leptodactylus fragilis, a frog species
- Limnonectes fragilis, a frog species endemic to China
- Leptodea fragilis, a freshwater mussel species

== See also ==
- Fragilis (disambiguation)
