= Fragilis (disambiguation) =

Fragilis is the human homolog of the Interferon-induced transmembrane protein.

Fragilis (Latin: fragilis, lit. 'fragile') may also refer to:

- A. fragilis (disambiguation), many species
- B. fragilis, a species of bacteria
- C. fragilis (disambiguation), many species
- D. fragilis, a species of single-celled excavates
- E. fragilis, a species of shrubs
- F. fragilis, a species of freshwater snail
- H. fragilis (disambiguation), many species
- K. fragilis, a species of yeast
- L. fragilis (disambiguation), many species
- O. fragilis (disambiguation), many species
- P. fragilis (disambiguation), many species
- R. fragilis, a species of mushroom
- S. fragilis (disambiguation), many species
- T. fragilis (disambiguation), many species
