= Maningrida arnhemensis =

Scientific classification
- Kingdom: Animalia
- Phylum: Mollusca
- Class: Gastropoda
- Subcohort: Panpulmonata
- Superfamily: Amphiboloidea
- Family: Maningrididae; Golding, Ponder & Byrne, 2007
- Genus: Maningrida; Golding, Ponder & Byrne, 2007
- Species: M. arnhemensis

Binomial name
- Maningrida arnhemensis Golding, Ponder & Byrne, 2007

Species of gastropod

Maningrida arnhemensis is a species of small, air-breathing land snail with an operculum, a pulmonate gastropod mollusc in the superfamily Amphiboloidea.

Maningrida arnhemensis is the only species in the genus Maningrida, which is the only genus within the family Maningrididae.

== Etymology ==
The genus Maningrida derives its name from Maningrida, Northern Territory, near where M. arnhemensis was found. The species name derives from Arnhem Land.

== Distribution ==
M. arnhemensis has only been found in three coastal locations in Arnhem Land, near the Blyth River and Liverpool River.
