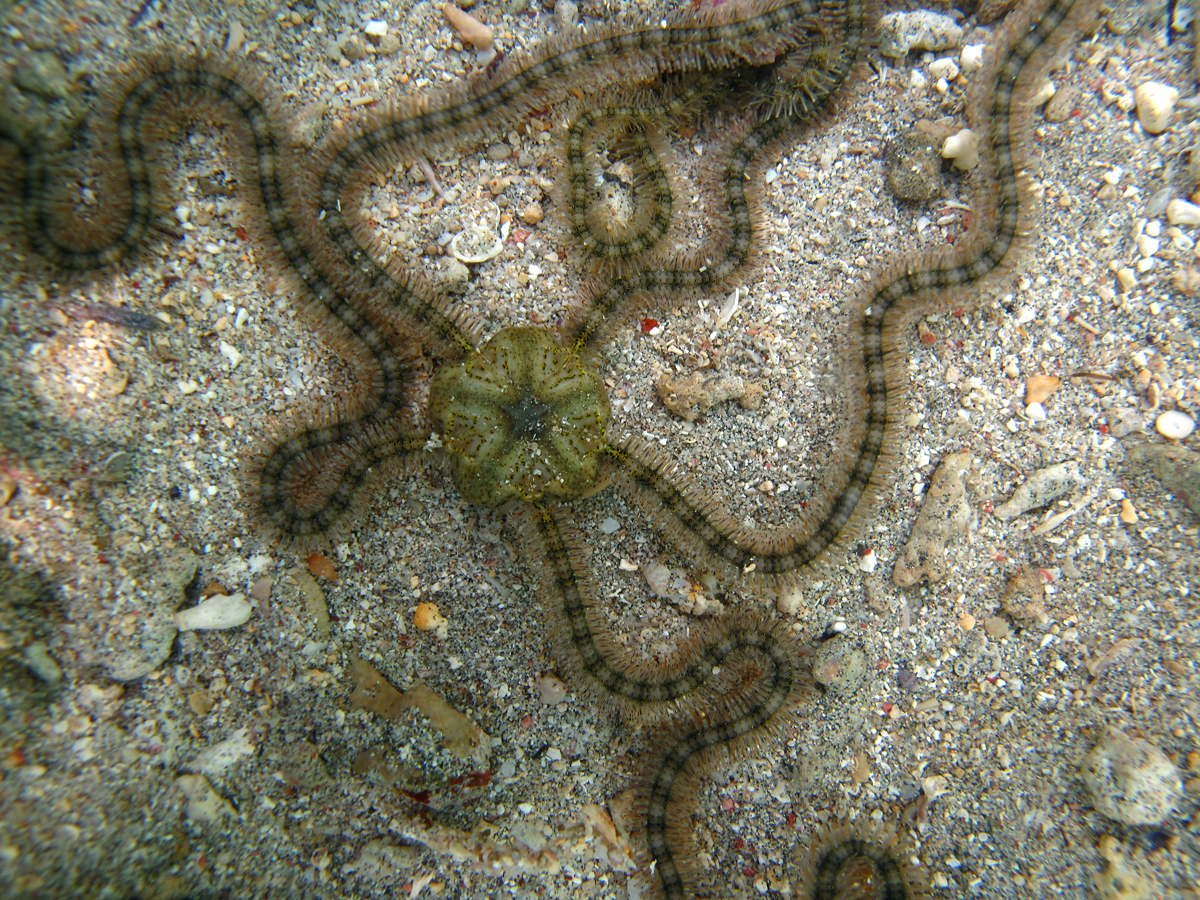
- Macrophiothrix longipeda

Scientific classification
- Kingdom: Animalia
- Phylum: Echinodermata
- Class: Ophiuroidea
- Order: Amphilepidida
- Family: Ophiotrichidae
- Genus: Macrophiothrix; H.L. Clark, 1938

Species
- See text

= Macrophiothrix =

Genus of brittle stars

Macrophiothrix is a genus of brittle stars.

== Species ==
- Macrophiothrix albolineata (H.L. Clark, 1938)
- Macrophiothrix albostriata (H.L. Clark, 1928)
- Macrophiothrix aspidota (Müller & Troschel, 1842)
- Macrophiothrix bellax (Koehler, 1922)
- Macrophiothrix belli (Döderlein, 1896)
- Macrophiothrix caenosa Hoggett, 2006
- Macrophiothrix callizona H.L. Clark, 1938
- Macrophiothrix capillaris (Lyman, 1879)
- Macrophiothrix coerulea (Djakonov, 1930)
- Macrophiothrix demessa (Lyman, 1861)
- Macrophiothrix elongata H.L. Clark, 1938
- Macrophiothrix encarsia (H.L. Clark, 1939)
- Macrophiothrix expedita (Koehler, 1905)
- Macrophiothrix galatheae (Lütken, 1872)
- Macrophiothrix hirsuta (Müller & Troschel, 1842)
- Macrophiothrix hybrida (H.L. Clark, 1915)
- Macrophiothrix hymenacantha (H.L. Clark, 1928)
- Macrophiothrix koehleri A.M. Clark, 1968
- Macrophiothrix lampra H.L. Clark, 1938
- Macrophiothrix leucosticha Hoggett, 1991
- Macrophiothrix lineocaerulea (H.L. Clark, 1928)
- Macrophiothrix longipeda (Lamarck, 1816)
- Macrophiothrix lorioli A.M. Clark, 1968
- Macrophiothrix martensi (Lyman, 1874)
- Macrophiothrix megapoma H.L. Clark, 1938
- Macrophiothrix melanosticta (Grube, 1868)
- Macrophiothrix michaelseni (Koehler, 1907)
- Macrophiothrix nereidina (Lamarck, 1816)
- Macrophiothrix nobilis (Koehler, 1905)
- Macrophiothrix obtusa (Koehler, 1905)
- Macrophiothrix oliveri (Benham, 1911)
- Macrophiothrix paucispina Hoggett, 1991
- Macrophiothrix pawsoni Liao, 2004
- Macrophiothrix propinqua (Lyman, 1861)
- Macrophiothrix pulchra (H.L. Clark, 1938)
- Macrophiothrix rhabdota (H.L. Clark, 1915)
- Macrophiothrix robillardi (de Loriol, 1893)
- Macrophiothrix smaragdina (Studer, 1882)
- Macrophiothrix speciosa (Koehler, 1898)
- Macrophiothrix spongicola (Stimpson, 1855)
- Macrophiothrix striolata (Grube, 1868)
- Macrophiothrix tenera (Brock, 1888)
- Macrophiothrix variabilis (Duncan, 1887)
- Macrophiothrix vicina (Koehler, 1930)
- Macrophiothrix virgata (Lyman, 1861)
