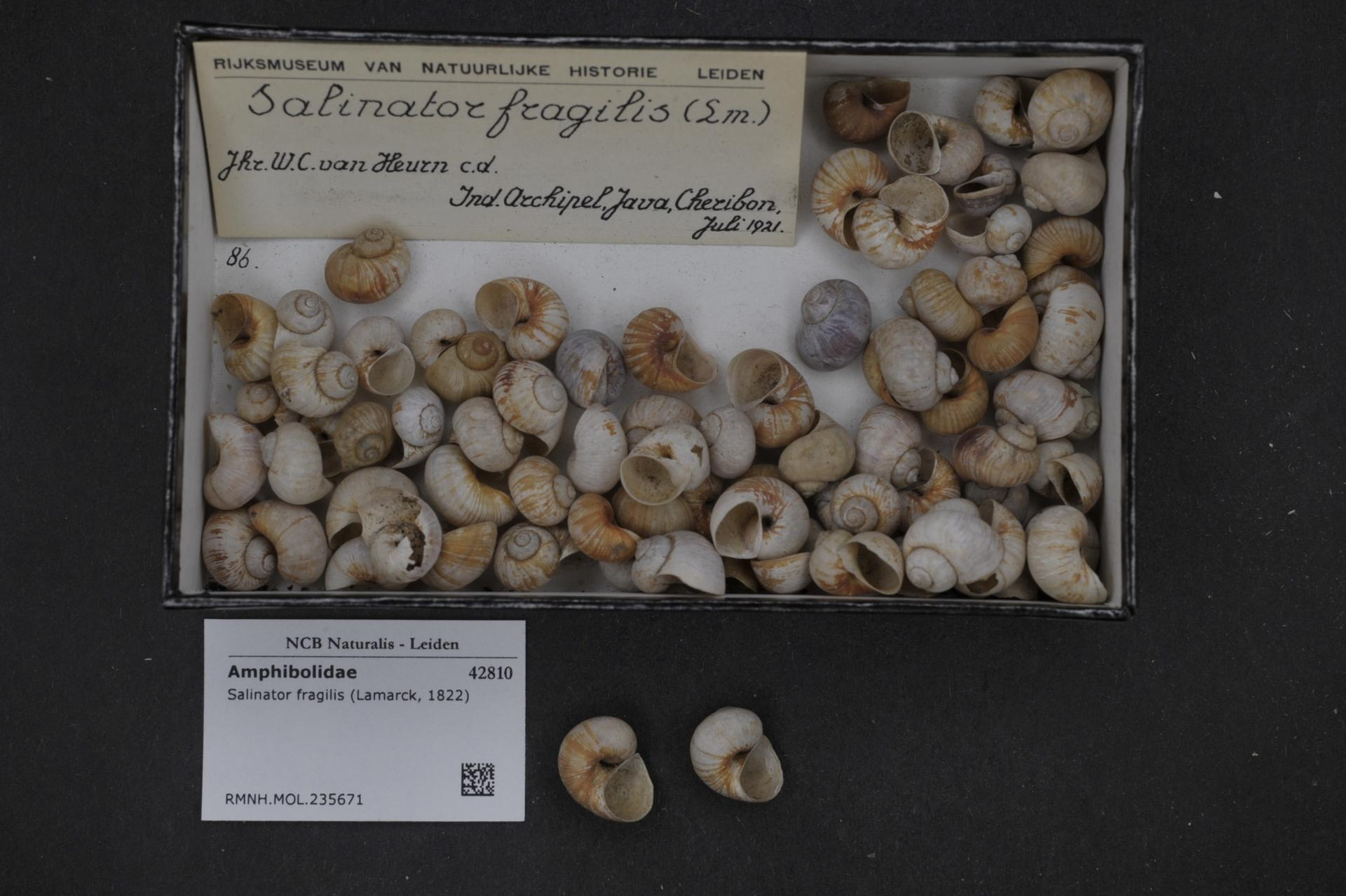
- Salinator fragilis shells

Scientific classification
- Kingdom: Animalia
- Phylum: Mollusca
- Class: Gastropoda
- Family: Amphibolidae
- Genus: Salinator
- Species: S. fragilis

Binomial name
- Salinator fragilis (Lamarck, 1822)

Synonyms
- Ampullaria fragilis Lamarck, 1822

= Salinator fragilis =

Species of gastropod

Salinator fragilis is a species of small, air-breathing land snail with an operculum, a pulmonate gastropod mollusc in the family Amphibolidae. The species is sometimes referred to as the fragile air breather. It was originally described as being in the genus Ampullaria, but was split off into the genus Salinator in 1900 by Charles Hedley.

== Distribution ==
This species lives on the coast of Australia and also in Melanesia. The species also reported from mangrove ecosystems of India i.e. Sunderbans, Kakinada bay and Mumbai.

== Habitat ==
This snail lives in salt-marshes, estuaries and mangrove ecosystems.

== Diet ==
This species feeds on detritus.
