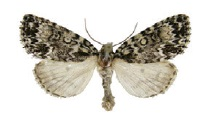

Scientific classification
- Kingdom: Animalia
- Phylum: Arthropoda
- Clade: Pancrustacea
- Class: Insecta
- Order: Lepidoptera
- Superfamily: Noctuoidea
- Family: Noctuidae
- Genus: Acronicta
- Species: A. fragilis

Binomial name
- Acronicta fragilis Guenée, 1852

Synonyms
- Acronicta spectans; Acronicta atrior

= Acronicta fragilis =

Species of moth

Acronicta fragilis, the fragile dagger moth, is a moth of the family Noctuidae. The species was first described by Achille Guenée in 1852. It is found in North America from Newfoundland to Florida, west across Canada, south to Kentucky and Minnesota. It is listed as a species of special concern in the US state of Connecticut.

The wingspan is about 30 mm. Adults are on wing from June to July depending on the location.

The larvae feed on apple, birch, plum, willow, and white spruce.

== Subspecies ==
- Acronicta fragilis minella
- Acronicta fragilis fragiloides
