= Phallomedusa solida =

Scientific classification
- Kingdom: Animalia
- Phylum: Mollusca
- Class: Gastropoda
- Family: Amphibolidae
- Genus: Phallomedusa
- Species: P. solida

Binomial name
- Phallomedusa solida (Martens, 1878)

Synonyms
- Salinator solida (Martens, 1878)

Species of gastropod

Phallomedusa solida is a species of small, air-breathing land snail with an operculum, a pulmonate gastropod mollusc.

In 2007, a publication by Golding, Ponder, and Byrne recombined Salinator solida as Phallomedusa solida and moved it to a new family, the Phallomedusidae.

== Distribution ==
This species lives on the eastern and southern coasts of Australia, in the states of Queensland, New South Wales, Victoria, Tasmania, South Australia, and Western Australia.

== Habitat ==
This snail lives in semi-marine conditions, being found most commonly in mangroves, salt-marshes and mud flats.

== Life habits ==
These snails feed on detritus.
