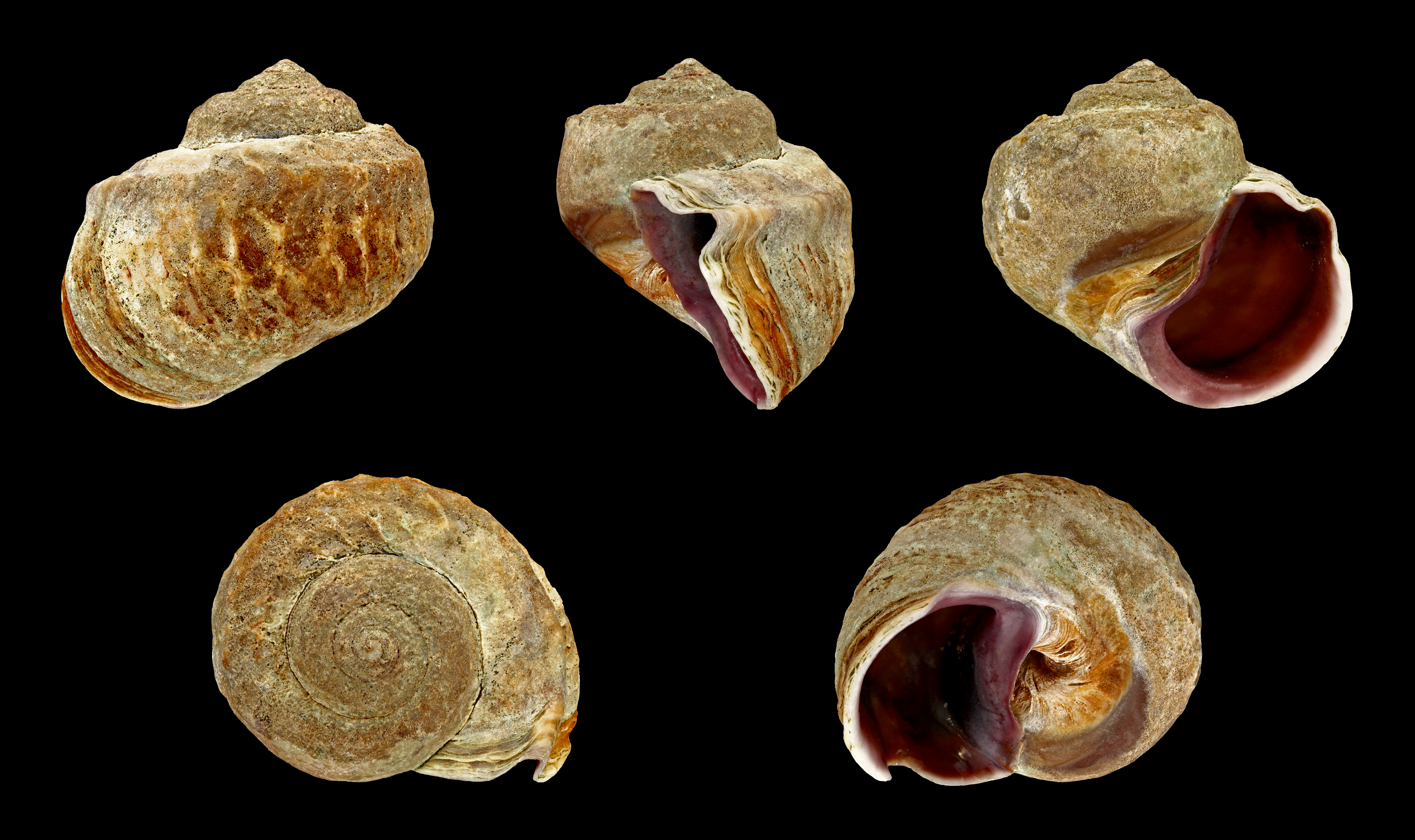
- A shell of Amphibola crenata

Conservation status
- Least Concern (IUCN 3.1)

Scientific classification
- Kingdom: Animalia
- Phylum: Mollusca
- Class: Gastropoda
- Family: Amphibolidae
- Genus: Amphibola; Schumacher, 1817
- Species: A. crenata

Binomial name
- Amphibola crenata (Gmelin, 1791)

Synonyms
- List: Amphibola australis Schumacher, 1817; Amphibola avellana (Bruguière, 1789); Amphibola crenata (Martyn, 1786) (non-binomial); Amphibola obvoluta Jonas, 1846; Bulimus avellana Bruguière, 1789; Cyclostrema obliquata Hutton, 1885; Helix crenata Gmelin, 1791; Limax crenata Martyn, 1786

= Amphibola crenata =

Mud-flat snail

Species of gastropod

Amphibola crenata (tītiko in the Māori language or mud-flat snail in English) is a species of air-breathing snail with an operculum, a pulmonate gastropod mollusc which lives in a habitat that is intermediate between the land and the sea, not entirely terrestrial and not entirely marine. This is not a true land snail, but it is also not a true sea snail. Unlike almost all other snails that have opercula, this species breathes air. It is common in New Zealand.

== Description ==
The thick shell of this species is about 20 mm in size.

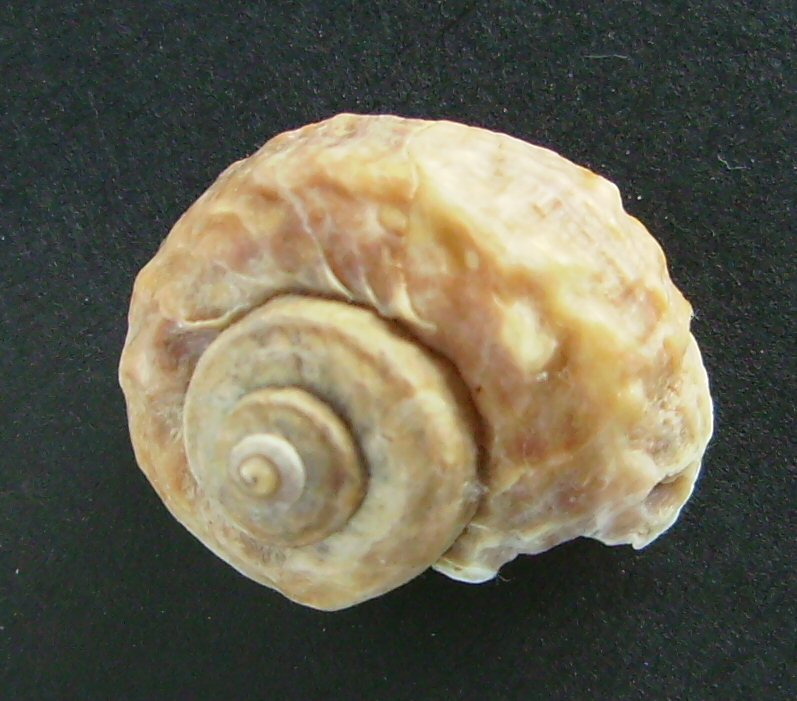
A shell of Amphibola crenata

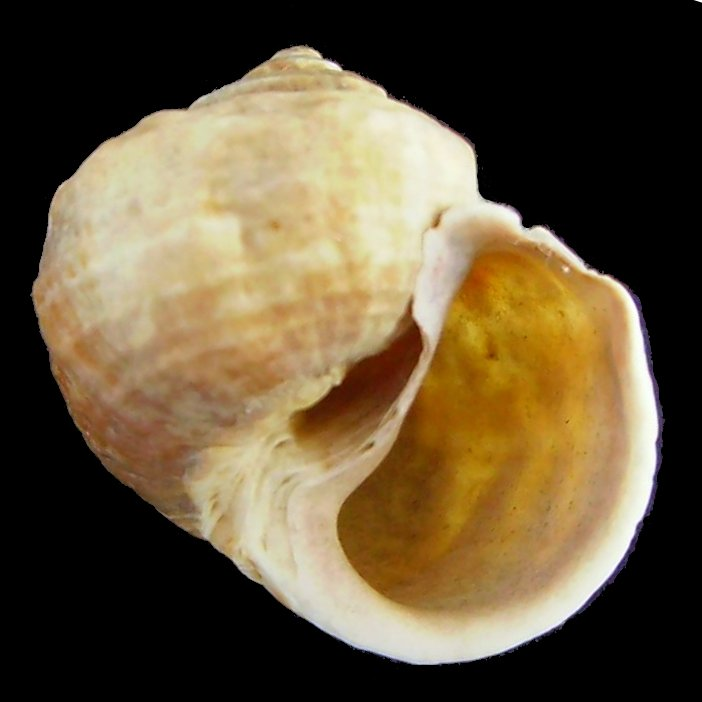
A shell of Amphibola crenata, underside view

== Ecology ==
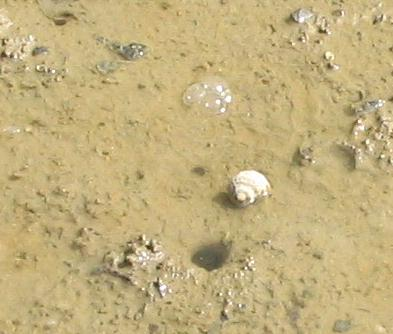
Amphibola crenata on mud near mangroves, New Zealand, with incoming tide

Amphibola crenata is a curiosity, as it seems to represent a transitional state between marine and terrestrial gastropods. The mantle is employed as a lung, and therefore immersion of the animal in sea water is of secondary importance, and occurs for not more than an hour at each high tide.

This is one of very few air-breathing marine snails with an operculum and a veliger larva.

=== Food chain ===
This snail is a detritus or deposit feeder. It extracts bacteria, diatoms and decomposing matter from the surface sand. It egests the sand and a slimy secretion that is a rich source of food for bacteria.

== Human use ==
In the past this species was an important food for the Māori.
