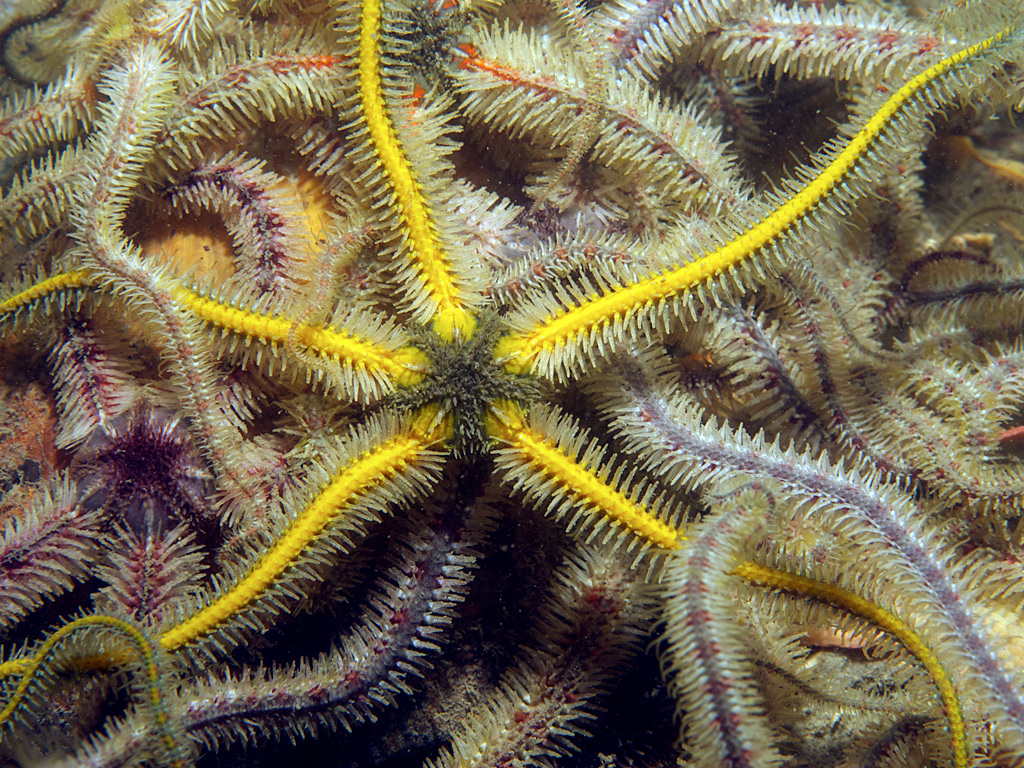
- The common brittle star, Ophiothrix fragilis, Strangford Lough, Co. Down, Northern Ireland.

Scientific classification
- Kingdom: Animalia
- Phylum: Echinodermata
- Class: Ophiuroidea
- Order: Amphilepidida
- Family: Ophiotrichidae
- Genus: Ophiothrix; Müller & Troschel, 1840

Species
- See text

= Ophiothrix =

Genus of brittle stars

Ophiothrix is a large genus of brittle stars (Ophiuroidea) found in oceans worldwide from tropics to Arctic and Antarctic regions. At present a total of 93 Ophiothrix species have been recognized. It is considered as one of the most interesting genera because of the presence of its brilliant colors and associations with coral and sponges as well. This genus has been labelled particularly difficult with respect to taxonomy, due to a high degree of variability in characters that are described is a morphological aspect.

== Evolution ==
The fossil record of brittle stars can be traced back around 500 million years to Early Ordovician period. Despite the fact there have been a considerable number of fossils reported from Paleozoic, Mesozoic and Cenozoic periods, a startlingly little amount is known about the evolutionary history of the group. Paleozoic ophiuroids bear an uncanny resemblance to the modern relatives with respect to ambulacral plate pairs which have been fused firmly into their vertebrae and ambulacral groove which their ventral arm plates cover. They also have the presence of ventrally lateral arm plates.

== Systematics and phylogeny ==
Ophiothrix is a large genus that is currently divided into the following three subgenera: Acanthophiothrix, Ophiothrix and Theophrix'. Extant species include:

Subgenus Ophiothrix (Acanthophiothrix)

- Ophiothrix armata Koehler, 1905
- Ophiothrix deceptor Koehler, 1922
- Ophiothrix diligens Koehler, 1898
- Ophiothrix exhibita Koehler, 1905
- Ophiothrix lepidus de Loriol, 1893
- Ophiothrix leucotrigonia H.L. Clark, 1918
- Ophiothrix proteus Koehler, 1905
- Ophiothrix purpurea von Martens, 1867
- Ophiothrix scorpio (Müller & Troschel, 1842)
- Ophiothrix scotiosa Murakami, 1943
- Ophiothrix signata Koehler, 1922
- Ophiothrix spinosissima Koehler, 1905
- Ophiothrix suensoni Lütken, 1856
- Ophiothrix versatilis Koehler, 1930
- Ophiothrix vetusta Koehler, 1930
- Ophiothrix vexator Koehler, 1930
- Ophiothrix vigelandi A.M. Clark, 1968
- Ophiothrix viridialba von Martens, 1867

Subgenus Ophiothrix (Ophiothrix)

- Ophiothrix accedens Koehler, 1930
- Ophiothrix ailsae Tommasi, 1970
- Ophiothrix angulata (Say, 1825)
- Ophiothrix aristulata Lyman, 1879
- Ophiothrix caespitosa Lyman, 1879
- Ophiothrix ciliaris (Lamarck, 1816)
- Ophiothrix consecrata Koehler, 1930
- Ophiothrix contenta Koehler, 1930
- Ophiothrix crassispina Koehler, 1904
- Ophiothrix deposita Koehler, 1904
- Ophiothrix dyscrita Clark, 1915
- Ophiothrix echinotecta Balinsky, 1957
- Ophiothrix elegans Lütken, 1869
- Ophiothrix exigua Lyman, 1874
- Ophiothrix foveolata Marktanner-Turneretscher, 1887
- Ophiothrix infirma Koehler, 1905
- Ophiothrix koreana Duncan, 1879
- Ophiothrix leucospida Koehler, 1930
- Ophiothrix liodisca H.L. Clark, 1915
- Ophiothrix marenzelleri Koehler, 1904
- Ophiothrix miles Koehler, 1905
- Ophiothrix oerstedii Lütken, 1856
- Ophiothrix oliveri Benham, 1910
- Ophiothrix panchyendyta Clark, 1911
- Ophiothrix pavida Koehler, 1922
- Ophiothrix picteti de Loriol, 1893
- Ophiothrix plana Lyman, 1874
- Ophiothrix prostrata Koehler, 1922
- Ophiothrix roseocoerulans Grube, 1868
- Ophiothrix rotata von Martens, 1870
- Ophiothrix rudis Lyman, 1874
- Ophiothrix savignyi (Müller & Troschel, 1842)
- Ophiothrix spiculata Le Conte, 1851
- Ophiothrix tradita Koehler, 1930
- Ophiothrix tricuspida Cherbonnier & Guille, 1978
- Ophiothrix trilineata Lütken, 1869
- Ophiothrix trindadensis Tommasi, 1970
- Ophiothrix vitrea Döderlein, 1896

Subgenus Ophiothrix (Theophrix)

- Ophiothrix pusilla Lyman, 1874

Subgenus not allocated

- Ophiothrix amphibola H.L. Clark, 1939
- Ophiothrix beata Koehler, 1907
- Ophiothrix berberis Lyman, 1879
- Ophiothrix brachyactis H.L. Clark, 1915
- Ophiothrix cimar Hendler, 2005
- Ophiothrix comata Müller & Troschel, 1842
- Ophiothrix congensis Koehler, 1911
- Ophiothrix convoluta Koehler, 1914
- Ophiothrix cotteaui (de Loriol, 1900)
- Ophiothrix dedita Koehler, 1930
- Ophiothrix dirrhabdota H.L. Clark, 1918
- Ophiothrix eurycolpodes H.L. Clark, 1918
- Ophiothrix fragilis (Abildgaard, in O.F. Müller, 1789)
- Ophiothrix galapagensis Lütken & Mortensen, 1899
- Ophiothrix hartforti A.H. Clark, 1939
- Ophiothrix innocens Koehler, 1898
- Ophiothrix lineata Lyman, 1860
- Ophiothrix luetkeni Wyville Thomson, 1873
- Ophiothrix maculata Ljungman, 1872
- Ophiothrix magnifica Lyman, 1860
- Ophiothrix marginata Koehler, 1905
- Ophiothrix merguiensis Duncan, 1887
- Ophiothrix nociva Koehler, 1907
- Ophiothrix pallida Ljungman, 1872
- Ophiothrix parasita Müller & Troschel, 1844
- Ophiothrix petersi Studer, 1882
- Ophiothrix planulatus Stimpson, 1855
- Ophiothrix platyactis H.L. Clark, 1939
- Ophiothrix quinquemaculata (Delle Chiaje, 1828)
- Ophiothrix rathbuni Ludwig, 1882
- Ophiothrix simplex Koehler, 1905
- Ophiothrix stri Hendler, 2005
- Ophiothrix synoecina Schoppe, 1996
- Ophiothrix tenuis Koehler, 1905
- Ophiothrix variegata Duncan, 1887
- Ophiothrix viator Koehler, 1904
