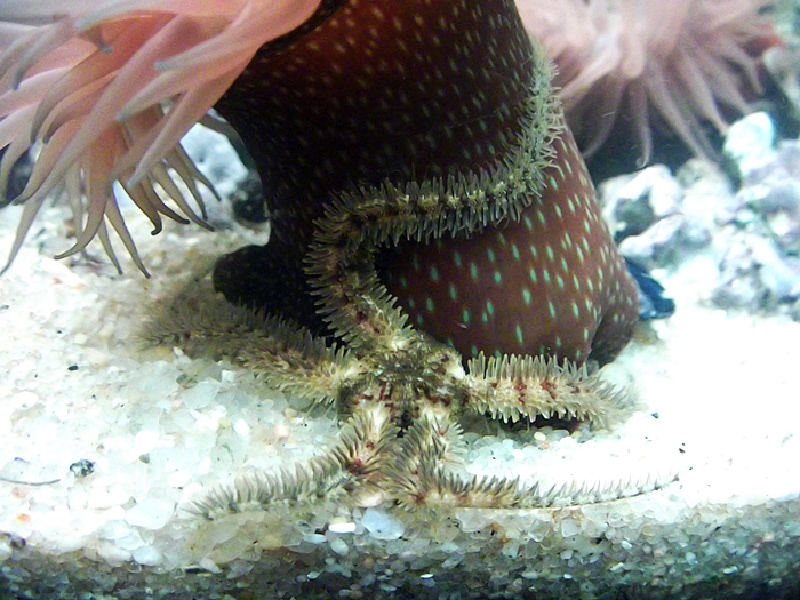
- Ophiothrix fragilis

Scientific classification
- Kingdom: Animalia
- Phylum: Echinodermata
- Class: Ophiuroidea
- Order: Ophiurida
- Family: Ophiotrichidae
- Genus: Ophiothrix
- Species: O. fragilis

Binomial name
- Ophiothrix fragilis Abildgaard, 1789

Synonyms
- Asteria cuvieri Delle Chiaje, 1828; Asteria ferrussacii Delle Chiaje, 1828; Asterias echinata Delle Chiaje, 1828; Asterias fragilis Abildgaard, in O.F. Müller, 1789; Asterias pentaphylla Pennant, 1777; Asterias rubra Delle Chiaje, 18??; Ophiocoma minuta Forbes, 1839; Ophiocoma rosula Forbes, 1839; Ophiothrix alopecurus Müller & Troschel, 1842; Ophiothrix echinata (Delle Chiaje, 1828); Ophiothrix ferussacii (Delle Chiaje, 18??); Ophiothrix fragilis var. abildgaardi; Ophiothrix fragilis var. echinata Delle; Ophiothrix fragilis var. lusitanica Ljungman, 1872; Ophiothrix fragilis var. pentaphyllum Pennant, 1777; Ophiothrix lusitanica Ljungman, 1872; Ophiothrix pentaphyllum (Abildgaard, 1789); Ophiothrix rammelsbergii Müller & Troschel, 1842; Ophiothrix rubra Ljungman, 1872; Ophiothrix triglochis Müller & Troschel, 1842

= Ophiothrix fragilis =

Species of brittle star

Ophiothrix fragilis is a species of brittle star in the order Ophiurida. It is found around the coasts of western Europe and is known in Britain as the common brittle star. It is also found along the coast of South Africa where it is known as the hairy brittle star.

== Description ==
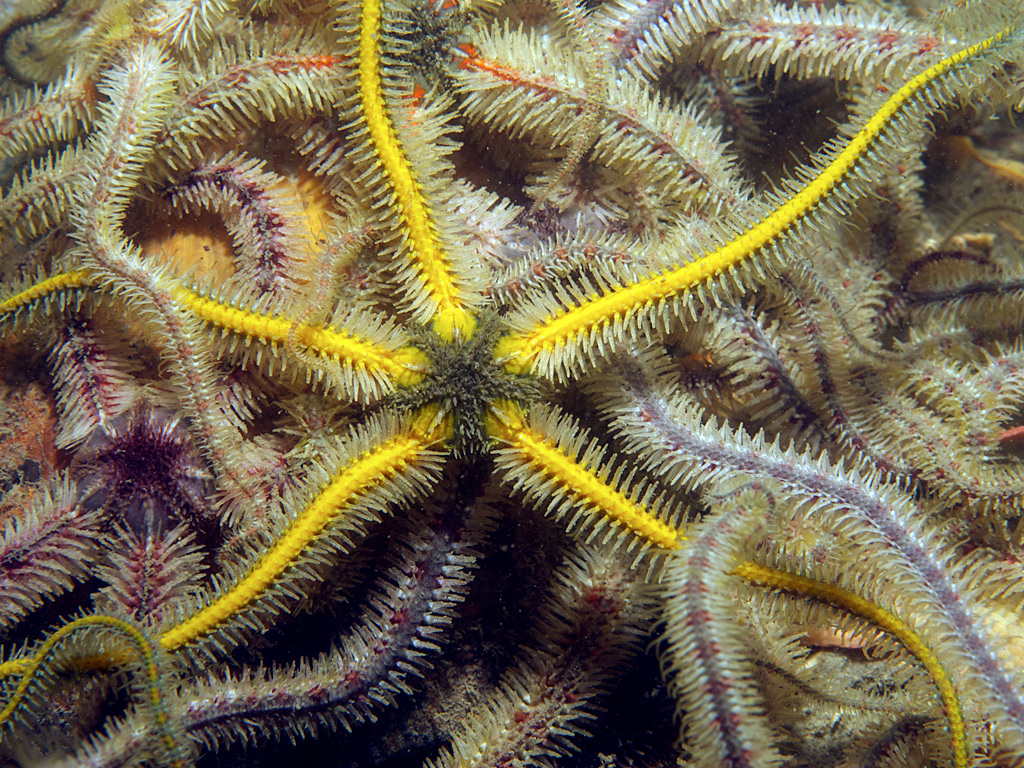
The common brittle star, Ophiothrix fragilis, Strangford Lough, Co. Down, Northern Ireland, -22 m, 5 September 2007.

The common brittle star is extremely variable in colouration, ranging from violet, purple or red to yellowish or pale grey, often spotted with red. The arms are usually white or grey with pink bands. The central disc is about one centimetre in diameter with the five arms being about five times as long. The disc is clothed in five rays of spines radiating from a spiny centre. Between these are five pairs of triangular plates, each pair forming a heart shaped pattern. The slender tapering arms are quite distinct from the disc and are covered with overlapping scales. The dorsal arm plates are naked and have a longitudinal keel. Each arm segment bears seven glassy, toothed spines. The arms are extremely fragile and easily shed, coming away either whole or in pieces.

== Distribution and habitat ==
This species is common around the coasts of Britain and Ireland and in the North Sea. It ranges southwards from the Lofoten Islands and Iceland to the Mediterranean Sea and the Azores, and along the west coast of Africa south to the Cape of Good Hope. It is most common on tide-swept rock and on coarse sediments, preferring hard substrates including sand and shingle. It is often found in empty shells or under stones, from the littoral zone down to 350 metres.

== Biology ==
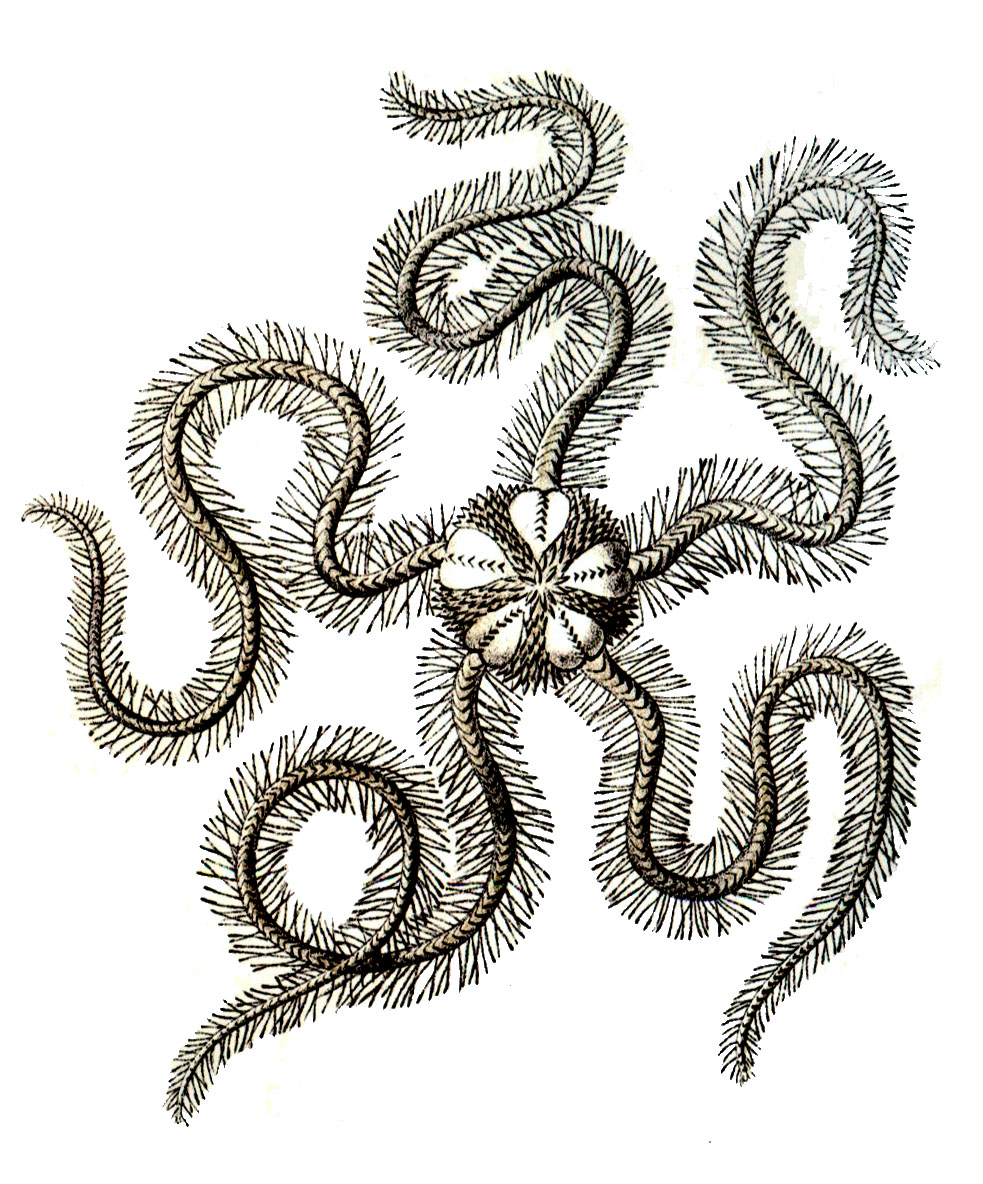
Ophiothrix fragilis

The common brittle star sometimes congregates offshore in vast numbers and as many as two thousand individuals have been recorded in a single square metre. Higher up the shore it normally lives a solitary existence under seaweed or pebbles or in crevices. It moves by jerking a pair of limbs forward and pulling itself along.

The common brittle star is a scavenger, feeding on dead organisms. It is also a suspension feeder, raising an arm and extending the tube feet in order to catch particles floating by. It then passes the food to the mouth with its arms. Its abundance varies according to environmental conditions including temperature and the availability of food. After mild winters, it has been found in very large numbers in the Oosterschelde estuary in the Netherlands.

The common brittle star is itself eaten by other species and can be found among the stomach contents of most common predators. However its glassy spicules may make it unpalatable, it lives in concealed places and is well camouflaged so that it blends in with its surroundings which combine to reduce predation. A study of skeletal bands suggests that it may live for as many as ten years.

Like some other brittle stars, Ophiothrix fragilis has symbiotic bacteria under its cuticle. The host-bacteria association can be upset by acute stress, and changes in levels of bacteria present can be used as an indicator of stress.

This brittle star usually spawns between May and January. Each individual is thought to spawn just once during each breeding season. A week after spawning, the planktonic larvae appear in the water column. They metamorphose into young brittle stars which drift in the plankton for about three weeks before settling. The smallest brittle stars found have just two segments per arm and a disc diameter of two millimetres.
