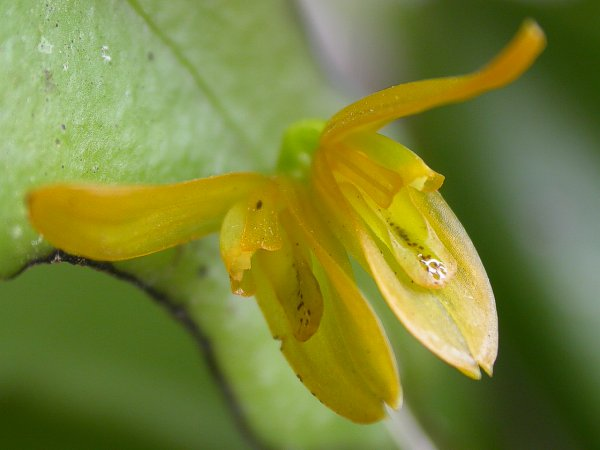

Scientific classification
- Kingdom: Plantae
- Clade: Tracheophytes
- Clade: Angiosperms
- Clade: Monocots
- Order: Asparagales
- Family: Orchidaceae
- Subfamily: Epidendroideae
- Genus: Acianthera
- Species: A. luteola

Binomial name
- Acianthera luteola (Lindl.) Pridgeon & M.W. Chase (2001)

Synonyms
- Pleurothallis luteola Lindl. (1841) (Basionym); Pleurothallis fragilis Lindl. (1841); Pleurothallis caespitosa Barb.Rodr. (1877); Pleurothallis caespitosa var. chrysantha Barb.Rodr. (1877); Humboldtia fragilis (Lindl.) Kuntze (1891); Pleurothallis caespitosa var. monantha Barb.Rodr. (1896); Pleurothallis subcordifolia Cogn. (1906); Specklinia luteola (Lindl.) F. Barros (1983)

= Acianthera luteola =

Species of orchid

Acianthera luteola is a species of orchid.

== Habitat ==
Is found in Brazil, in the state of Minas Gerais, and in Argentina, in the province of Misiones
