= Phallomedusa =

Scientific classification
- Kingdom: Animalia
- Phylum: Mollusca
- Class: Gastropoda
- Family: Amphibolidae
- Subfamily: Phallomedusinae; Golding, Ponder & Byrne, 2007
- Genus: Phallomedusa; Golding, Ponder & Byrne, 2007

Diversity
- 2 species

Genus of gastropods

Phallomedusa is a genus of small, air-breathing land snails with an operculum, a pulmonate gastropod mollusc.

Phallomedusa is the only genus in the subfamily Phallomedusinae.

== Species ==
Species in the genus Phallomedusa include:

- Phallomedusa solida (Martens, 1878)
- Phallomedusa austrina Golding, Ponder & Byrne, 2007
