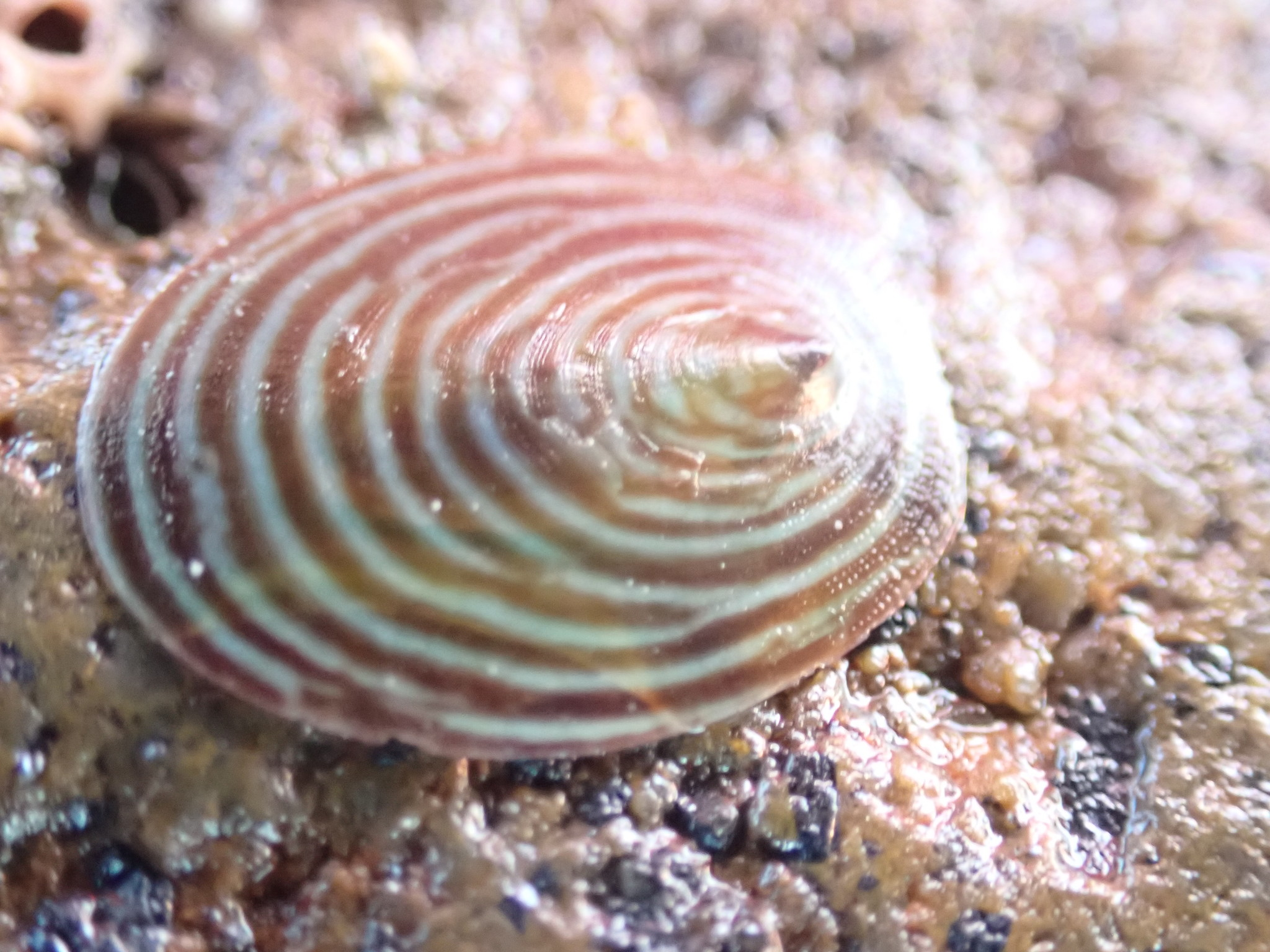

Scientific classification
- Kingdom: Animalia
- Phylum: Mollusca
- Class: Gastropoda
- Subclass: Patellogastropoda
- Family: Lottiidae
- Genus: Atalacmea
- Species: A. fragilis

Binomial name
- Atalacmea fragilis (G.B. Sowerby I, 1823)

Synonyms
- Patella fragilis G.B. Sowerby I, 1823; Patella unguisalmae Lesson, 1830; Patella solandri Colenso, 1844; Acmaea fragilis Suter, 1913

= Atalacmea fragilis =

Species of gastropod

Atalacmea fragilis is a species of sea snail or true limpet, a marine gastropod mollusc in the family Lottiidae, one of the families of true limpets.

== Description ==
(Described in French as Patella unguisalmae) The shell is translucent, fragile, oval in shape, and very depressed, almost flat, with a claw-shaped apex set far back and marked like a small point. The margin is regular, thin, and smooth. The upper surface is covered with raised, regular concentric circles that gradually increase in size, being very small at first around the apex.

The inner surface is slightly concave, smooth, and edged with an emerald-green ring. The exterior is green with brown circles, while the interior ground is slightly reddish. This attractive limpet reaches a maximum length of eight lines (18 mm.), a width of seven lines (15.8 mm), and a height of one and a half lines (3.4 mm).

== Distribution ==
This marine species occurs off New Zealand.
