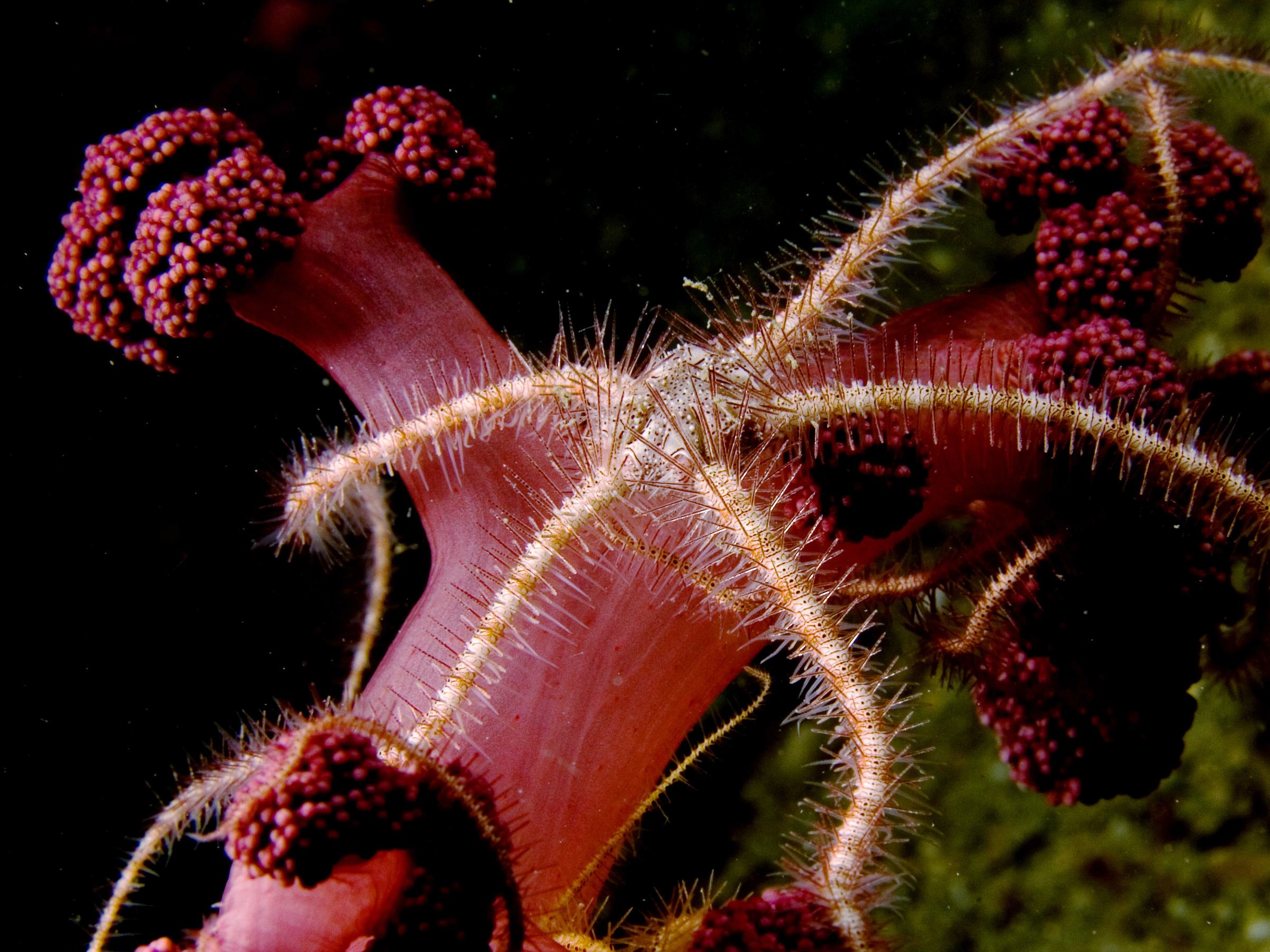
- Ophiothrix foveolata

Scientific classification
- Kingdom: Animalia
- Phylum: Echinodermata
- Class: Ophiuroidea
- Order: Amphilepidida
- Suborder: Gnathophiurina
- Superfamily: Ophiactoidea
- Family: Ophiotrichidae; Ljungman, 1867

Type genus
- Ophiothrix Müller & Troschel, 1840

Genera
- 13, see text

= Ophiotrichidae =

Ophiotrichidae Temporal range: 83.6–0 Ma Late Cretaceous to Present

Family of echinoderms

Ophiotrichidae is a family of brittle stars in the superfamily of Ophiactoidea belonging to the suborder Gnathophiurina. The earliest certain fossils from this family (Ophiothrix sp.) date back to the Late Campanian in the Late Cretaceous. (Note: The status of Ophiothrix royeri is uncertain, hence the fossil range is chosen from the next fossil belonging to Ophiothrix bongaertsi.)

== Characteristics ==
The species in this family have arms with delicate and translucent spines. Their arms are flexible in all directions and their jaws contain clusters of well-developed tooth papillae on the apex but not on the sides. There are no mouth papillae. Inside the mouth edge, there is a second pair of tube feet. They have large radial shields and the dorsal surface of the disc is covered with spines and thorny towers.

== Taxonomy ==
The phylogenetic tree per O'Hara et al. (2017) is as follows.

- Gnathophiurina
  - - - Ophiactoidea
        - - - Ophiotrichidae
            - Ophiopholidae
          - - Ophiactidae
        - - Ophiothamnidae
  - Amphiuroidea
    - Amphiuridae
    - Amphilepididae

There are 13 genera in this family.

- Gymnolophus Brock, 1888
- Lissophiothrix H.L. Clark, 1938
- Macrophiothrix H.L. Clark, 1938
- Ophiocnemis Müller & Troschel, 1842
- Ophiogymna Ljungman, 1866
- Ophiolophus Marktanner-Turneretscher, 1887
- Ophiomaza Lyman, 1871
- Ophiophthirius Döderlein, 1898
- Ophiopsammium Lyman, 1874
- Ophiopteron Ludwig, 1888
- Ophiothela Verrill, 1867
- Ophiothrix Müller & Troschel, 1840
- Ophiotrichoides Ludwig, 1882
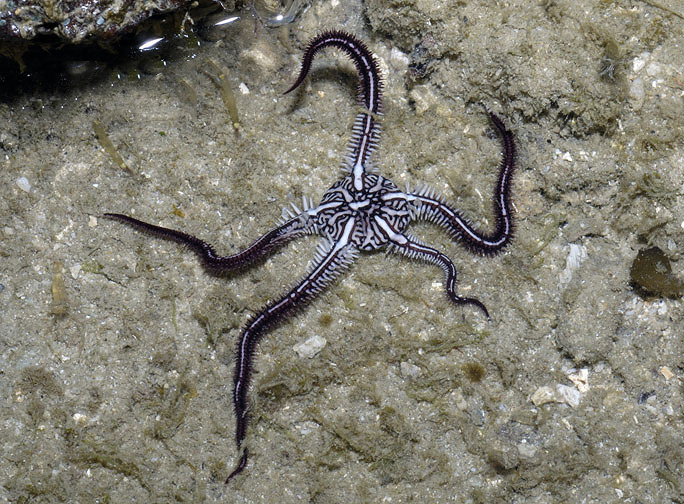
Ophiomaza cacaotica

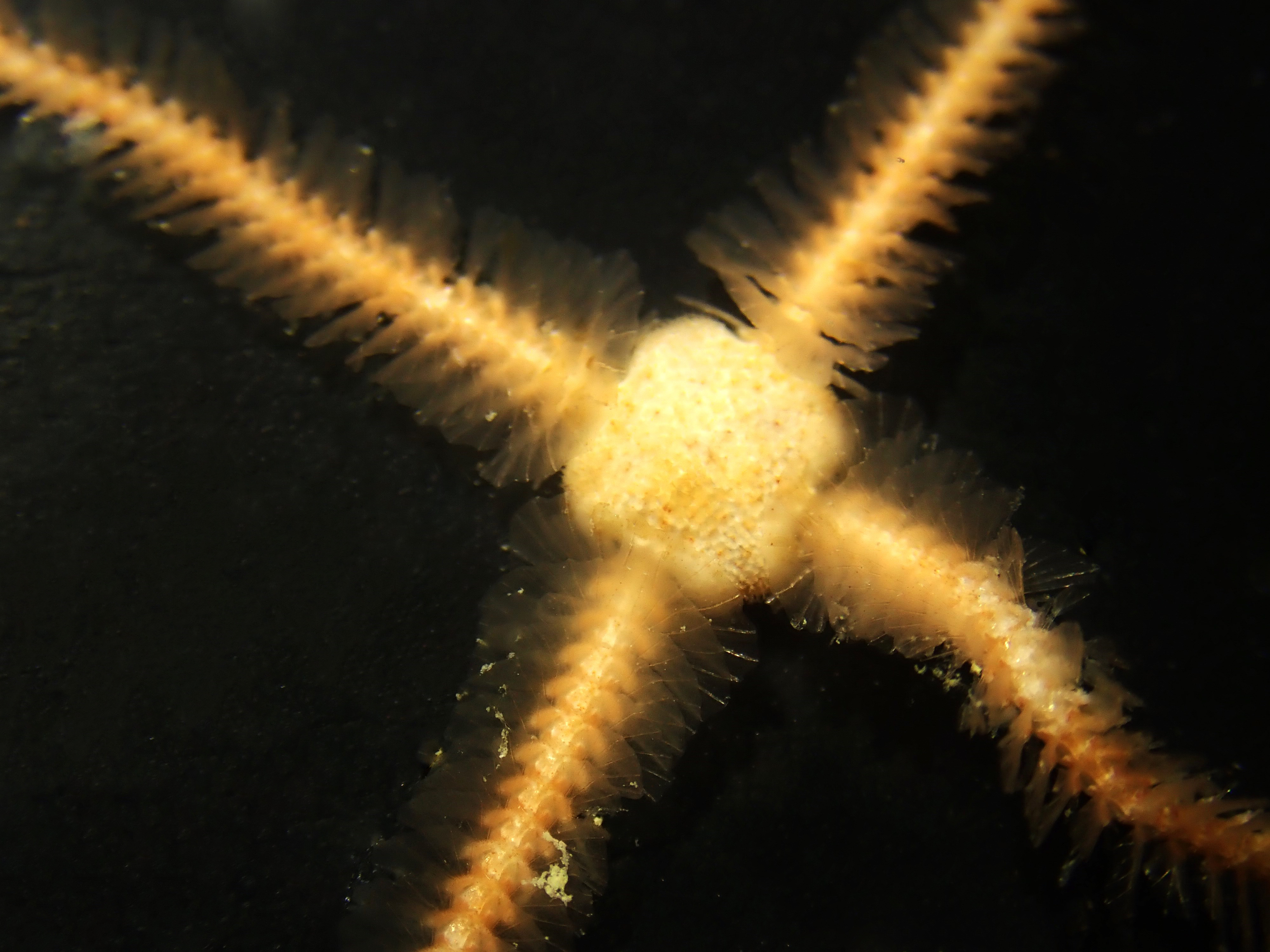
Ophiopteron elegans

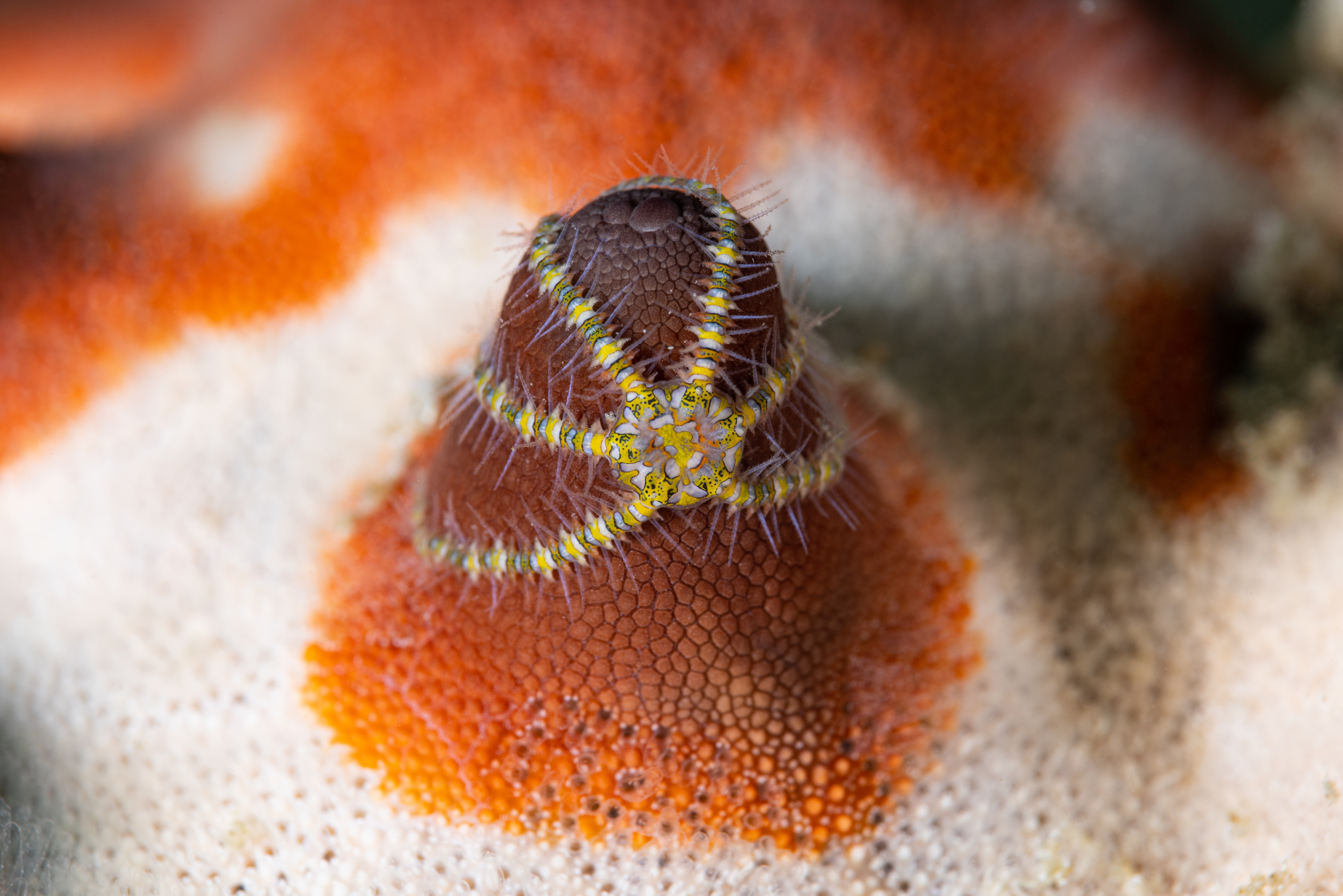
Ophiothela mirabilis

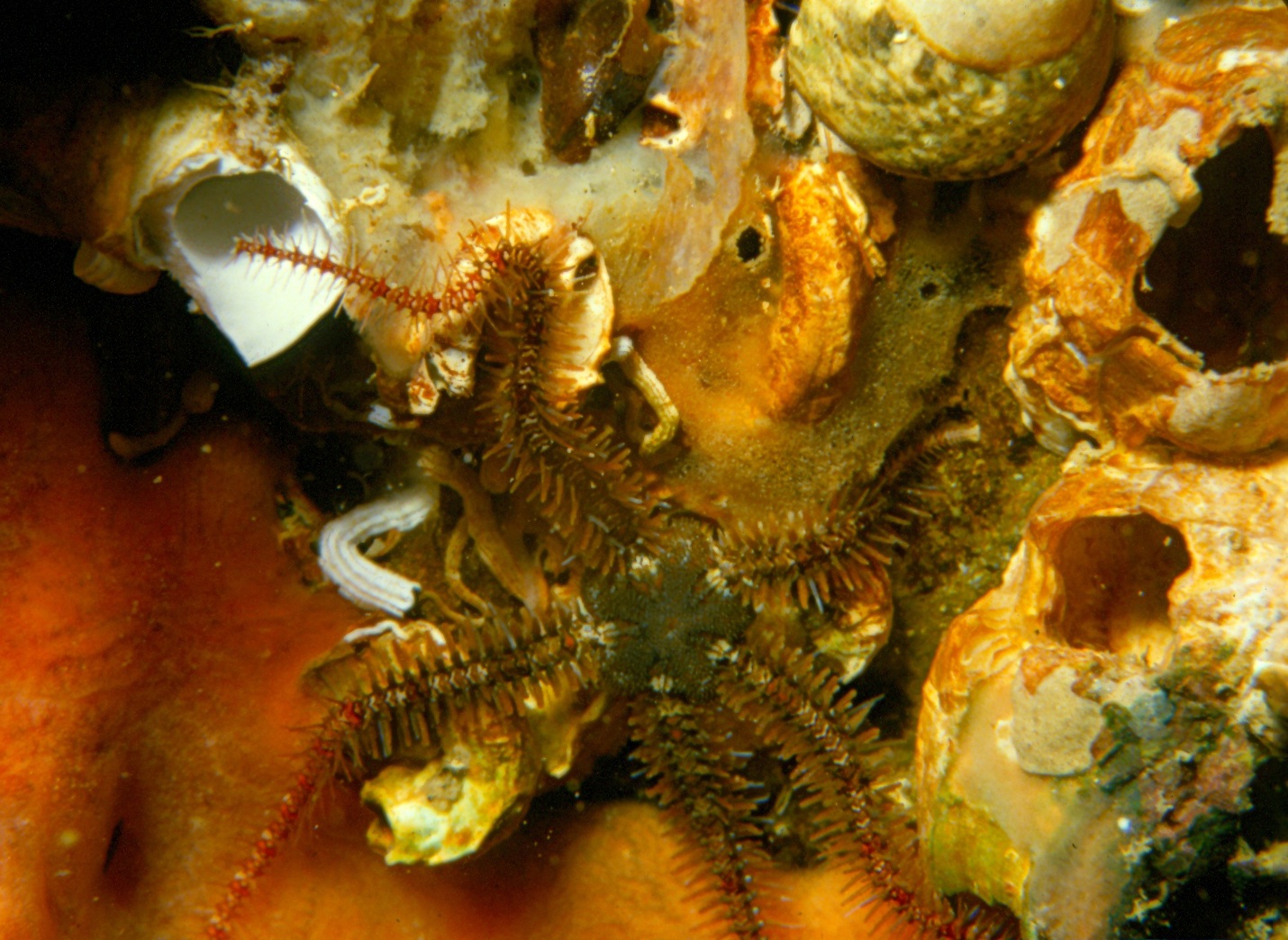
Ophiothrix fragilis

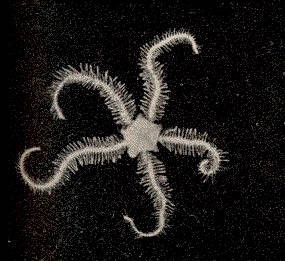
Ophiothrix angulata
