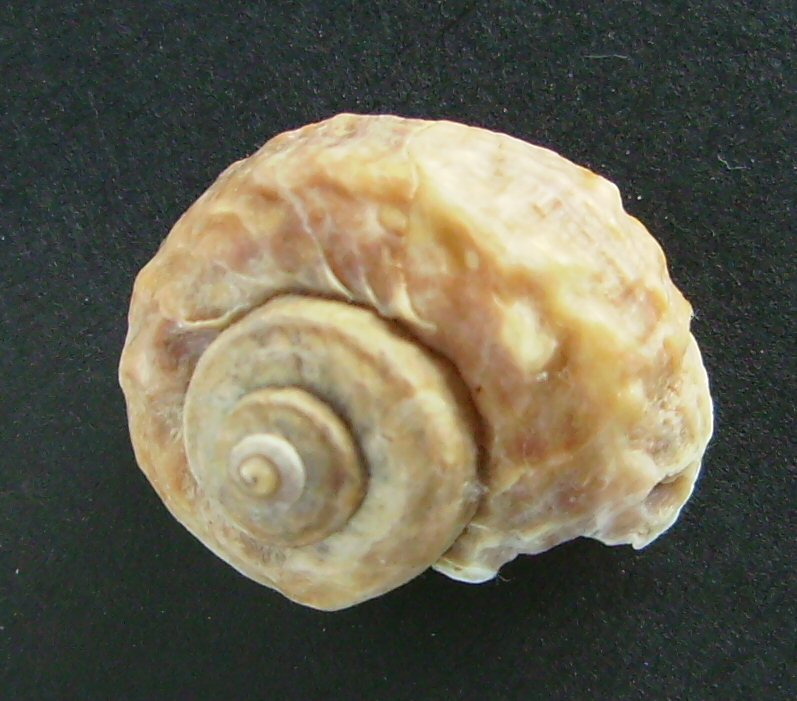
- A shell of the mud-flat snail, Amphibola crenata

Scientific classification
- Kingdom: Animalia
- Phylum: Mollusca
- Class: Gastropoda
- Superfamily: Amphiboloidea
- Family: Amphibolidae; J. E. Gray, 1840

Genera
- See text.

Diversity
- 4 genera, 12 species

Synonyms
- Ampullaceridae Troschel, 1845; Salinatoridae Starobogatov, 1970

= Amphibolidae =

Family of gastropods

Amphibolidae is a family of air-breathing snails with opercula, terrestrial pulmonate gastropod molluscs.

This family of pulmonate gastropods, for breathe air, but also have opercula and at least some species go through a free-swimming veliger stage.

== Taxonomy ==
=== 2005 taxonomy ===
According to the taxonomy of the Gastropoda (Bouchet & Rocroi, 2005), it was an only family within a superfamily Amphiboloidea in the informal group Basommatophora, within the Pulmonata.

=== 2010 taxonomy ===
Jörger et al. (2010) have moved Amphiboloidea to Panpulmonata.

== Genera ==
Genera and species within the family Amphibolidae include:

- Amphibola Schumacher, 1817
- Lactiforis Golding, Ponder & Byrne, 2007
- Naranjia Golding, Ponder & Byrne, 2007 - with the only one species: Naranjia swatowensis (Yen, 1939)
- Phallomedusa Golding, Ponder & Byrne, 2007
- Salinator Hedley, 1900

Genera brought into synonymy

- Ampullacera Quoy & Gaimard, 1832: synonym of Amphibola Schumacher, 1817
- Thallicera Swainson, 1840: synonym of Amphibola Schumacher, 1817
