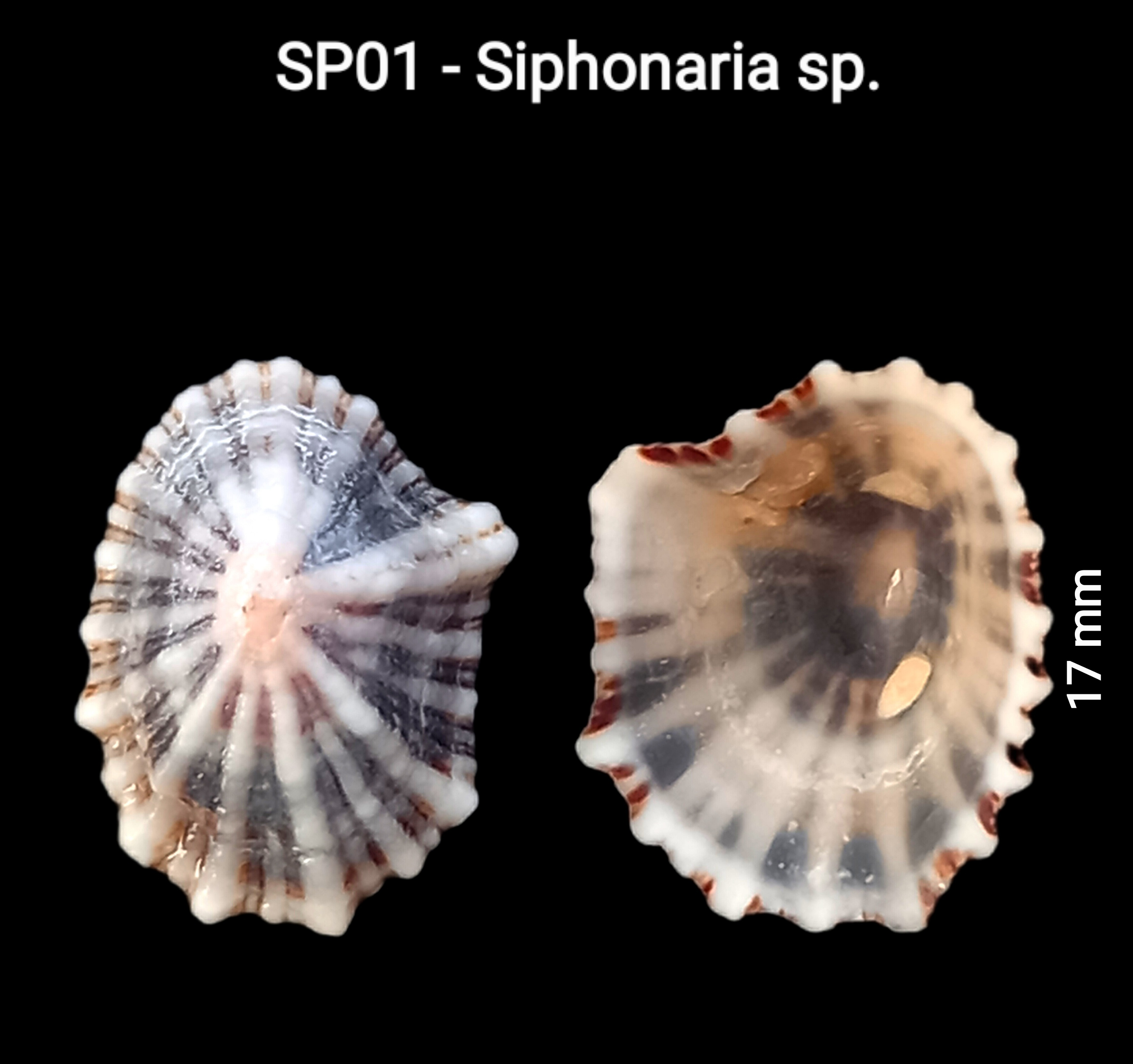
- SP01 - Siphonaria - 17 mm

Scientific classification
- Kingdom: Animalia
- Phylum: Mollusca
- Class: Gastropoda
- Order: Siphonariida
- Superfamily: Siphonarioidea
- Family: Siphonariidae
- Genus: Siphonaria; Sowerby I, 1823

Type species
- Siphonaria sipho G. B. Sowerby I, 1823

Synonyms
- Anthosiphonaria Kuroda & Habe, 1971; Ductosiphonaria Hubendick, 1945; Hubendickula McAlpine, 1952; Kerguelenella Powell, 1946; Kerguelenia Mabille & Rochebrune, 1889 (Invalid: junior homonym of Kerguelenia Stebbing, 1888 [Crustacea]; Kerguelenella is a replacement name); Liriola Dall, 1870; Mouretus Blainville, 1824; Parellsiphon Iredale, 1940; Patellopsis Nobre, 1886; Planesiphon Zilch, 1959 (junior synonym); Simplisiphonaria Hubendick, 1945; Siphonaria (Anthosiphonaria) Kuroda & Habe, 1971 · alternate representation; Siphonaria (Ductosiphonaria) Hubendick, 1945; Siphonaria (Kerguelenella) Powell, 1946; Siphonaria (Liriola) Dall, 1870; Siphonaria (Mouretus) Blainville, 1824; Siphonaria (Patellopsis) Nobre, 1886; Siphonaria (Planesiphon) Zilch, 1859 (junior synonym); Siphonaria (Sacculosiphonaria) Hubendick, 1945 (a junior synonym); Siphonaria (Siphonaria) Sowerby I, 1823; Talisiphon Iredale, 1940 (junior synonym); Torquisiphon Iredale, 1940

= Siphonaria =

Genus of molluscs

Siphonaria is a genus of air-breathing sea snails in the family Siphonariidae (false limpets). They are globally distributed living in temperate to tropical benthic intertidal zones making up a significant component of invertebrate fauna in those regions. There are many species (over ~100) within this genus although the exact amount is unknown due to their large variety in shell morphology.

== Distribution ==
This genus occurs worldwide in most tropical and temperate seas.

=== China ===
The coast of China has many species such as Siphonaria atra, Siphonaria floslamellosa, Siphonaria japonica, Siphonaria petasus and Siphonaria sirius.

=== Korean Peninsula ===
Siphonaria acmaeoides is known to inhabit the coast of the Korean Peninsula. Many species in the coastal regions of China can also be found here suck as S. japonica and S. sirius. Some species have questionably reported to live in this region given their documented geographic distribution such as Siphonaria coreensis, Siphonaria javanica, Siphonaria laciniosa and Siphonaria rucuana.

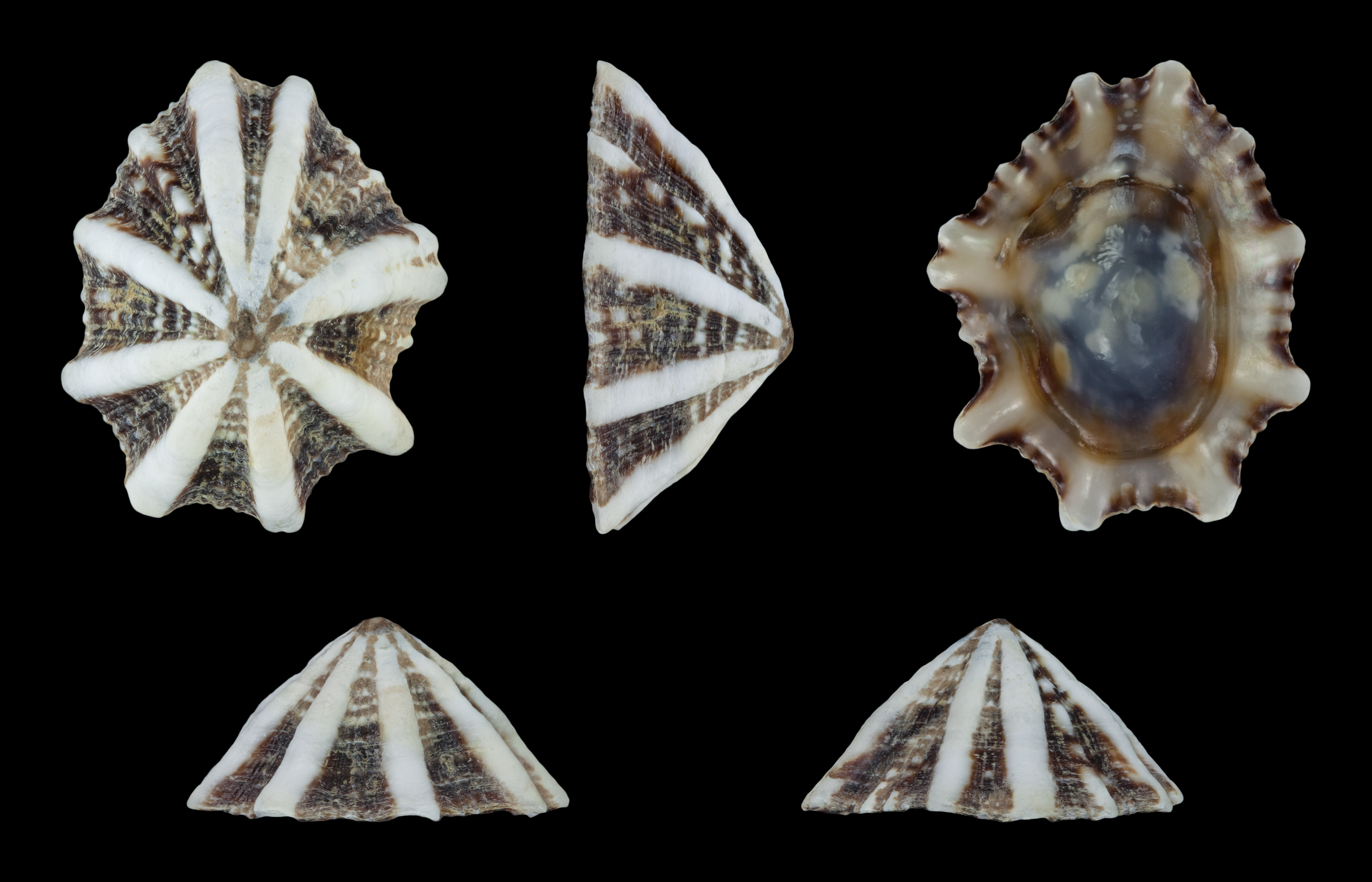
A shell of Siphonaria sirius

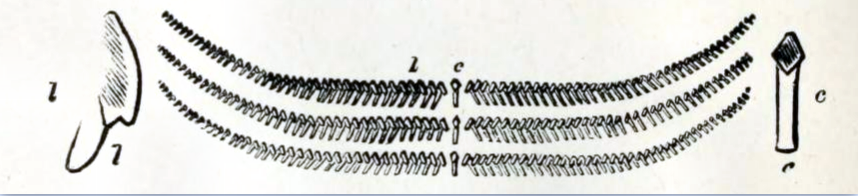
Three rows of the radula of Siphonaria; c) central tooth l) lateral teeth

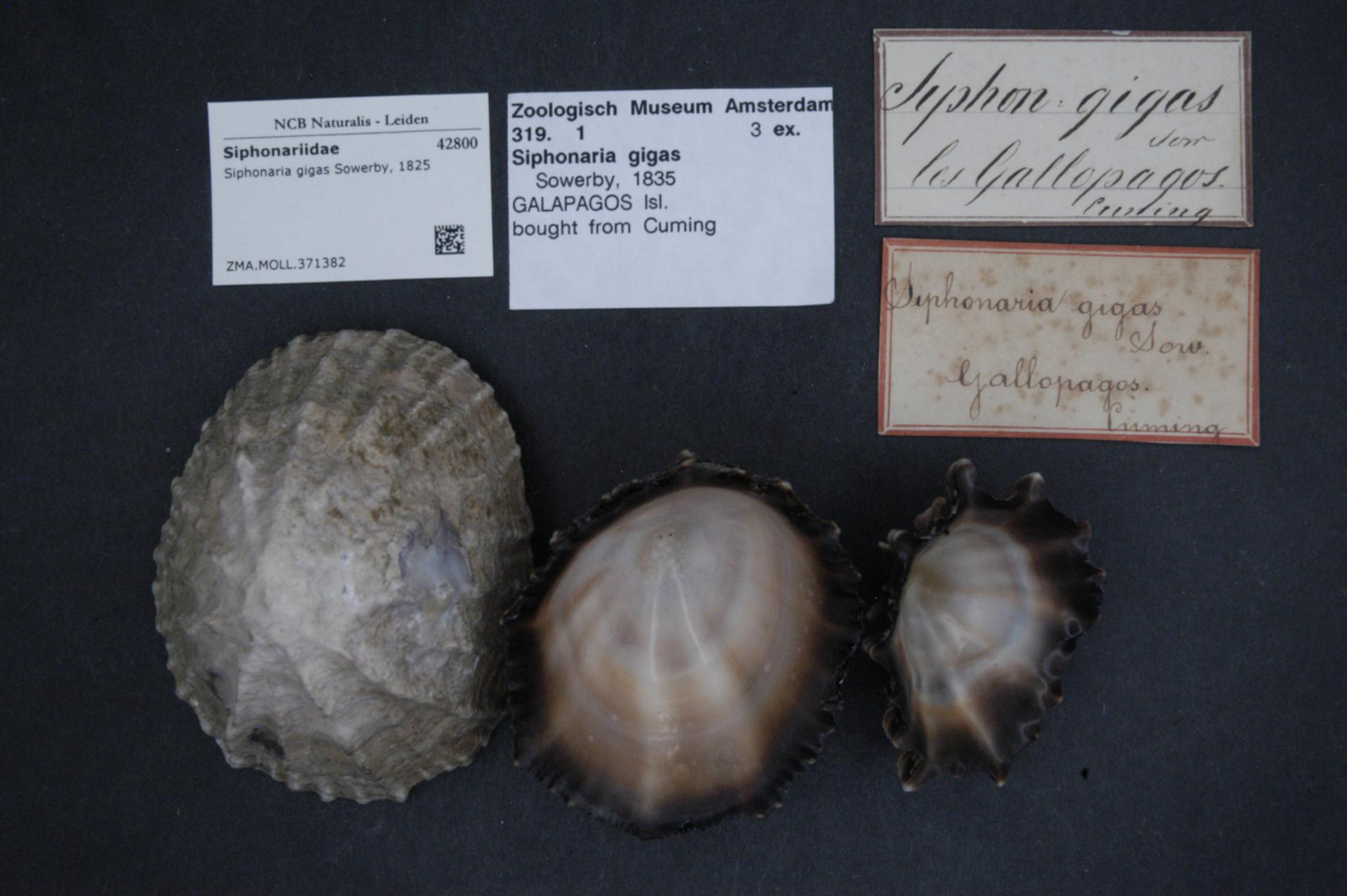
Siphonaria gigas Sowerby, 1825. Museum specimens

== Ecology ==
This genus is found in benthic and intertidal habitats. It constitutes a significant component of the macrobenthic invertebrate fauna in intertidal habitats across temperate to tropical regions.

== Species ==
Intertidal fluctuations in the environment gives rise to large amounts variations in their shells making it difficult to identify and describe species only using traditional morphological classification methods. The limited study on the shell morphology of this genus also adds to the difficulty. During the late Pliocene to the Pleistocene epochs around 3.46–1.53 million years ago, this genus underwent a rapid diversification event with the climate likely being an important driver of this diversification event.

According to the World Register of Marine Species (WoRMS), the following species are included in the genus Siphonaria:

- Siphonaria acmaeoides Pilsbry, 1894
- Siphonaria acuta Quoy & Gaimard, 1833
- Siphonaria aequilirata Carpenter, 1857
- Siphonaria aequilorata Reeve, 1856
- Siphonaria alba Hubendick, 1943
- Siphonaria albicante Quoy & Gaimard, 1833
- Siphonaria alternata Say, 1826
- Siphonaria alternicosta Potiez & Michaud, 1838
- Siphonaria asghar Biggs, 1958
- Siphonaria atra Quoy & Gaimard, 1833
- Siphonaria australis Quoy & Gaimard, 1833
- Siphonaria basseinensis Melvill, 1893
- Siphonaria belcheri Hanley, 1858
- Siphonaria bifurcata Reeve, 1856
- † Siphonaria bisiphites Michelin, 1831
- Siphonaria brannani Stearns, 1872
- Siphonaria brasiliana Reeve, 1856
- Siphonaria brunnea Hanley, 1858
- Siphonaria capensis Quoy & Gaimard, 1833
- Siphonaria carbo Hanley, 1858
- Siphonaria characteristica Reeve, 1842
- Siphonaria chirura Pilsbry, 1920
- Siphonaria compressa Allanson, 1958
- Siphonaria concinna Sowerby, 1830
- Siphonaria corallina Christiaens, 1980
- Siphonaria corrugata Reeve, 1856
- Siphonaria corrumbinensis Hubendick, 1955
- † Siphonaria costaria (Deshayes, 1824)
- Siphonaria costata G. B. Sowerby I, 1835
- † Siphonaria crassicostata Deshayes, 1861
- Siphonaria crenata de Blainville, 1827
- Siphonaria dayi Allanson, 1958
- Siphonaria denticulata Quoy & Gaimard, 1833
- Siphonaria diemenensis Quoy & Gaimard, 1833
- Siphonaria elatior Schrenck, 1867
- Siphonaria exulum Hanley, 1858
- Siphonaria ferruginea Reeve, 1856
- Siphonaria floslamellosa
- Siphonaria fuegiensis Güller, Zelaya & Ituarte, 2015
- Siphonaria funiculata Reeve, 1856
- Siphonaria gigas Sowerby, 1825 - giant false limpet
- † Siphonaria glabrata de Raincourt, 1876
- Siphonaria guamensis Quoy & Gaimard, 1833
- Siphonaria henica Verrill & Bush, 1900
- Siphonaria hispida Hubendick, 1946
- Siphonaria incerta Deshayes, 1863
- Siphonaria innocuus (Iredale, 1940)
- Siphonaria innominata (Iredale, 1915)
- † Siphonaria irregularis Sacco, 1897
- Siphonaria japonica (Donovan, 1824)
- Siphonaria javanica (Lamarck, 1819)
- Siphonaria jeanae Jenkins, 1984
- Siphonaria kurracheensis (Reeve, 1856)
- Siphonaria laciniosa (Linnaeus, 1758)
- Siphonaria laeviuscula G. B. Sowerby I, 1835
- Siphonaria lateralis Gould, 1846
- † Siphonaria laubrierei Cossmann, 1889
- Siphonaria lepida Gould, 1848
- Siphonaria lessonii Blainville, 1824
- † Siphonaria liancurtensis Cossmann, 1892
- Siphonaria lineolata G. B. Sowerby I, 1835
- Siphonaria macgillivrayi Reeve, 1856
- Siphonaria macquariensis (Powell, 1939)
- Siphonaria madagascarensis Ohdner, 1919
- Siphonaria maura Sowerby, 1835
- Siphonaria naufragum Stearns, 1872
- Siphonaria normalis Gould, 1846
- Siphonaria oculus Krauss
- Siphonaria parcicostata Deshayes, 1863
- Siphonaria parma Hanley, 1858
- Siphonaria pascua Rehder, 1980
- † Siphonaria paucidigitata Cossmann, 1907
- Siphonaria pectinata (Linnaeus, 1758) - striped false limpet
- Siphonaria percea (Iredale, 1940)
- Siphonaria pica G. B. Sowerby I, 1835
- Siphonaria petasus
- Siphonaria pisangensis Hubendick, 1947
- Siphonaria placentula Menke, 1853
- Siphonaria plicata Quoy & Gaimard, 1833
- † Siphonaria polygona (Michelotti, 1847)
- Siphonaria propria Jenkins, 1983
- Siphonaria punctata Quoy & Gaimard, 1833
- Siphonaria raoulensis Oliver, 1915
- Siphonaria redimiculum Reeve, 1856
- Siphonaria rosea Hubendick, 1943
- Siphonaria rucuana Pilsbry, 1904
- Siphonaria savignyi Krauss, 1848
- Siphonaria serrata (Fischer von Waldheim, 1807)
- Siphonaria siquijorensis Reeve, 1856
- Siphonaria sirius Pilsbry, 1894
- † Siphonaria spectabilis Deshayes, 1861
- Siphonaria stellata (Helbling, 1779)
- Siphonaria stewartiana (Powell, 1939)
- Siphonaria subatra Pilsbry, 1904
- Siphonaria subrugosa G. B. Sowerby I, 1835
- Siphonaria tasmanica Tenison-Woods, 1876
- Siphonaria tenuis Philippi, 1860
- Siphonaria thersites Carpenter, 1864
- Siphonaria tongensis Hubendick, 1943
- † Siphonaria tournoueri Vasseur, 1881
- Siphonaria tristensis (Leach, 1824)
- † Siphonaria vasconiensis Michelin, 1831
- Siphonaria venosa Reeve, 1856
- Siphonaria viridis Quoy & Gaimard, 1833
- † Siphonaria vulcanica Harzhauser, Landau & Breitenberger, 2017
- Siphonaria williamsi Berry, 1969
- † Siphonaria xinglongtaiensis Youluo, 1978
- Siphonaria zelandica Quoy & Gaimard, 1833

Taxa inquirenda

- Siphonaria adjacens W. H. Turton, 1932
- † Siphonaria alpinula Mayer, 1870
- Siphonaria angulata Gray, 1825
- Siphonaria becki W. H. Turton, 1932
- Siphonaria conica Blainville, 1827
- Siphonaria coreensis A. Adams & Reeve, 1848 (taxon inquirendum)
- Siphonaria depressa Pease, 1862
- Siphonaria depressior Schrenck, 1867
- Siphonaria fuliginata Reeve, 1856
- † Siphonaria granicosta Cossmann, 1895
- Siphonaria kowiensis W. H. Turton, 1932
- Siphonaria luzonica Reeve, 1856
- Siphonaria melanozonias (Gmelin, 1791)
- Siphonaria nigra Pallary, 1900
- Siphonaria oblivirgulata Hubendick, 1943
- Siphonaria opalescens Davis, 1904
- Siphonaria pallida Allanson, 1958
- Siphonaria palmata Carpenter, 1857
- Siphonaria palpebrum Reeve, 1856
- † Siphonaria penjinae Dall, 1893
- Siphonaria picta d'Orbigny, 1839
- Siphonaria plana Quoy & Gaimard, 1833 (nomen dubium)
- Siphonaria radiata Gray, 1824
- Siphonaria scabra Reeve, 1856
- Siphonaria sowerbyi Michelin, 1832
- † Siphonaria xinglongtaiensis Youluo, 1978

Species brought into synonymy

- Siphonaria adansonii de Blainville, 1827: synonym of Siphonaria pectinata (Linnaeus, 1758)
- Siphonaria algesirae Quoy & Gaimard, 1832: synonym of Siphonaria pectinata (Linnaeus, 1758)
- Siphonaria amara Reeve, 1856: synonym of Siphonaria normalis Gould, 1846
- Siphonaria amphibia W. R. B. Oliver, 1915: synonym of Siphonaria raoulensis W. R. B. Oliver, 1915
- Siphonaria anneae Tomlin, 1944: synonym of Siphonaria carbo Hanley, 1858
- Siphonaria aspera Krauss, 1848: synonym of Siphonaria serrata (Fischer von Waldheim, 1807)
- Siphonaria baconi Reeve, 1856: synonym of Siphonaria zelandica Quoy & Gaimard, 1833
- Siphonaria blainvillei Hanley, 1858: synonym of Siphonaria funiculata Reeve, 1856 (junior synonym)
- Siphonaria cancer Reeve, 1856: synonym of Siphonaria australis Quoy & Gaimard, 1833
- Siphonaria cheesemani W. R. B. Oliver, 1915: synonym of Siphonaria raoulensis W. R. B. Oliver, 1915
- Siphonaria cochleariformis Reeve, 1856: synonym of Siphonaria japonica (Donovan, 1824) (nomen dubium, doubtful synonym)
- Siphonaria cookiana Suter, 1909: synonym of Siphonaria australis Quoy & Gaimard, 1833
- Siphonaria cyaneomaculata (Sowerby III, 1906): synonym of Siphonaria concinna Sowerby I, 1823
- Siphonaria deflexa (Helbling, 1779): synonym of Siphonaria concinna G. B. Sowerby I, 1823
- Siphonaria grisea Gmelin: synonym of Siphonaria pectinata (Linnaeus, 1758)
- Siphonaria inculta Gould, 1846: synonym of Siphonaria australis Quoy & Gaimard, 1833
- Siphonaria intermedia Schrenck, 1867: synonym of Siphonaria sipho G. B. Sowerby I, 1823 accepted as Siphonaria javanica (Lamarck, 1819) (unavailable: not Siphonaria intermedia Murray, 1857)
- Siphonaria jonasi Dunker, 1853: synonym of Siphonaria pectinata (Linnaeus, 1758)
- Siphonaria lecanium Philippi, 1846: synonym of Siphonaria maura G. B. Sowerby I, 1835 (junior subjective synonym)
- Siphonaria lineolata d'Orbigny, 1842: synonym of Siphonaria pectinata (Linnaeus, 1758)
- Siphonaria macauleyensis W. R. B. Oliver, 1915: synonym of Siphonaria raoulensis W. R. B. Oliver, 1915
- Siphonaria mouret Sowerby G.B. I, 1825: synonym of Siphonaria pectinata (Linnaeus, 1758)
- Siphonaria mouretus de Blainville, 1824: synonym of Siphonaria pectinata (Linnaeus, 1758)
- Siphonaria natalensis Krauss, 1848: synonym of Siphonaria serrata (Fischer von Waldheim, 1807) (junior synonym)
- Siphonaria naufraga Stearns, 1872: synonym of Siphonaria pectinata (Linnaeus, 1758)
- Siphonaria nigerrima E. A. Smith, 1903: synonym of Siphonaria carbo Hanley, 1858
- Siphonaria nuttallii Hanley, 1858: synonym of Siphonaria normalis Gould, 1846
- Siphonaria obliquata G. B. Sowerby I, 1825: synonym of Benhamina obliquata (Sowerby I, 1825)
- Siphonaria palmata Carpenter, 1857: synonym of Siphonaria lecanium var. palmata Carpenter, 1857 (taxon inquirendum)
- Siphonaria redimiculum Reeve, 1856: synonym of Kerguelenella lateralis (Gould, 1846)
- Siphonaria sipho G.B. Sowerby I, 1830: synonym of Siphonaria javanica (Lamarck, 1819)
- Siphonaria stellata Blainville, 1827: synonym of Siphonaria laciniosa (Linnaeus, 1758)
- Siphonaria stowae Verco, 1906: synonym of Pugillaria stowae (Verco, 1906)
- Siphonaria striatocostata Dunker, 1846: synonym of Siphonaria pectinata (Linnaeus, 1758)
- Siphonaria tenuicostulata Smith: synonym of Siphonaria carbo Hanley, 1858
- Siphonaria variabilis Krauss, 1848: synonym of Siphonaria concinna Sowerby I, 1823
- Siphonaria virgulata Hedley, 1915: synonym of Siphonaria funiculata Reeve, 1856
- Siphonaria zebra Reeve, 1856: synonym of Siphonaria zelandica Quoy & Gaimard, 1833
