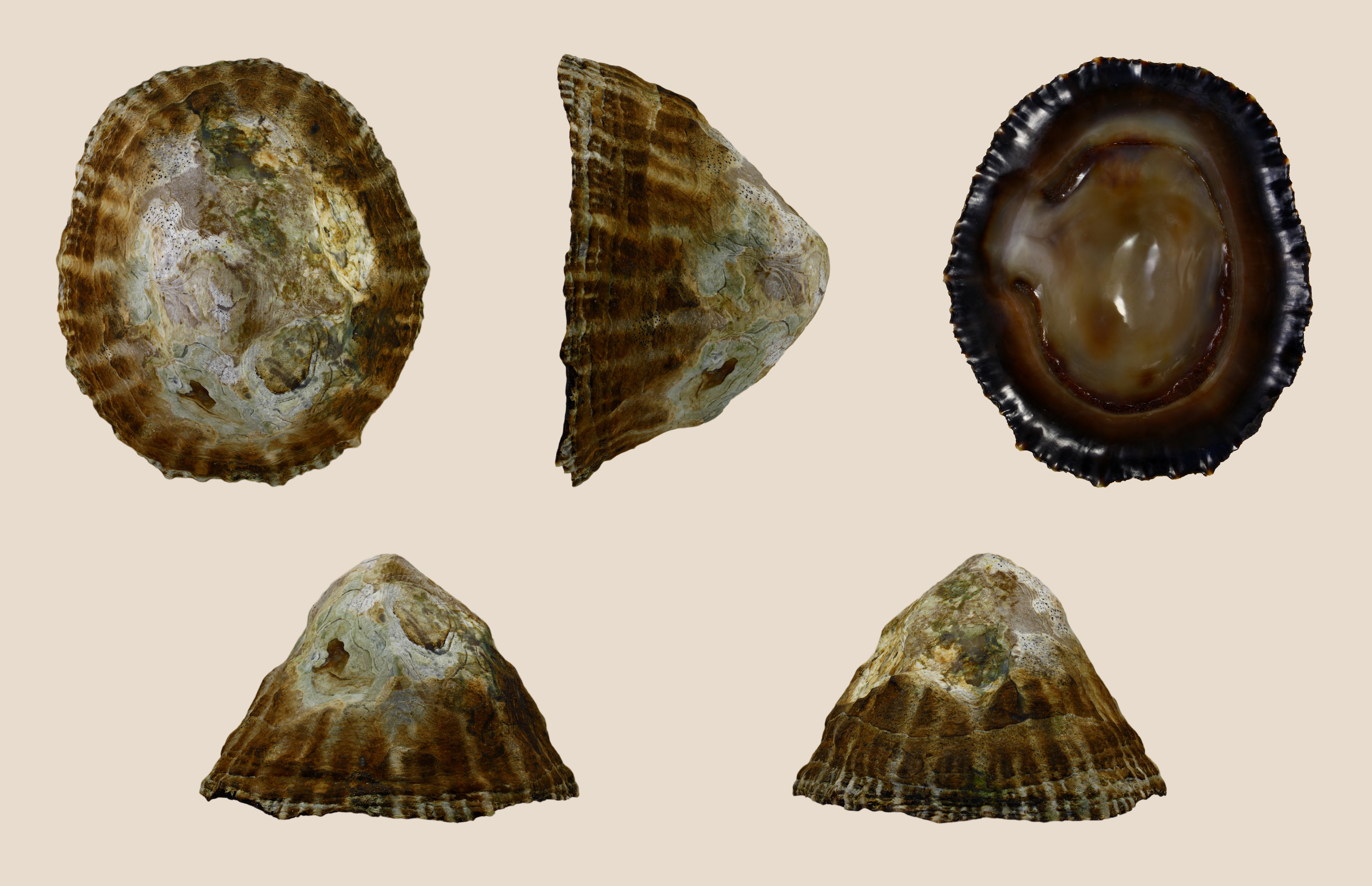
- Five views of a shell of Siphonaria gigas G.B. Sowerby I, 1825

Scientific classification
- Kingdom: Animalia
- Phylum: Mollusca
- Class: Gastropoda
- Order: Siphonariida
- Family: Siphonariidae
- Genus: Siphonaria
- Species: S. gigas

Binomial name
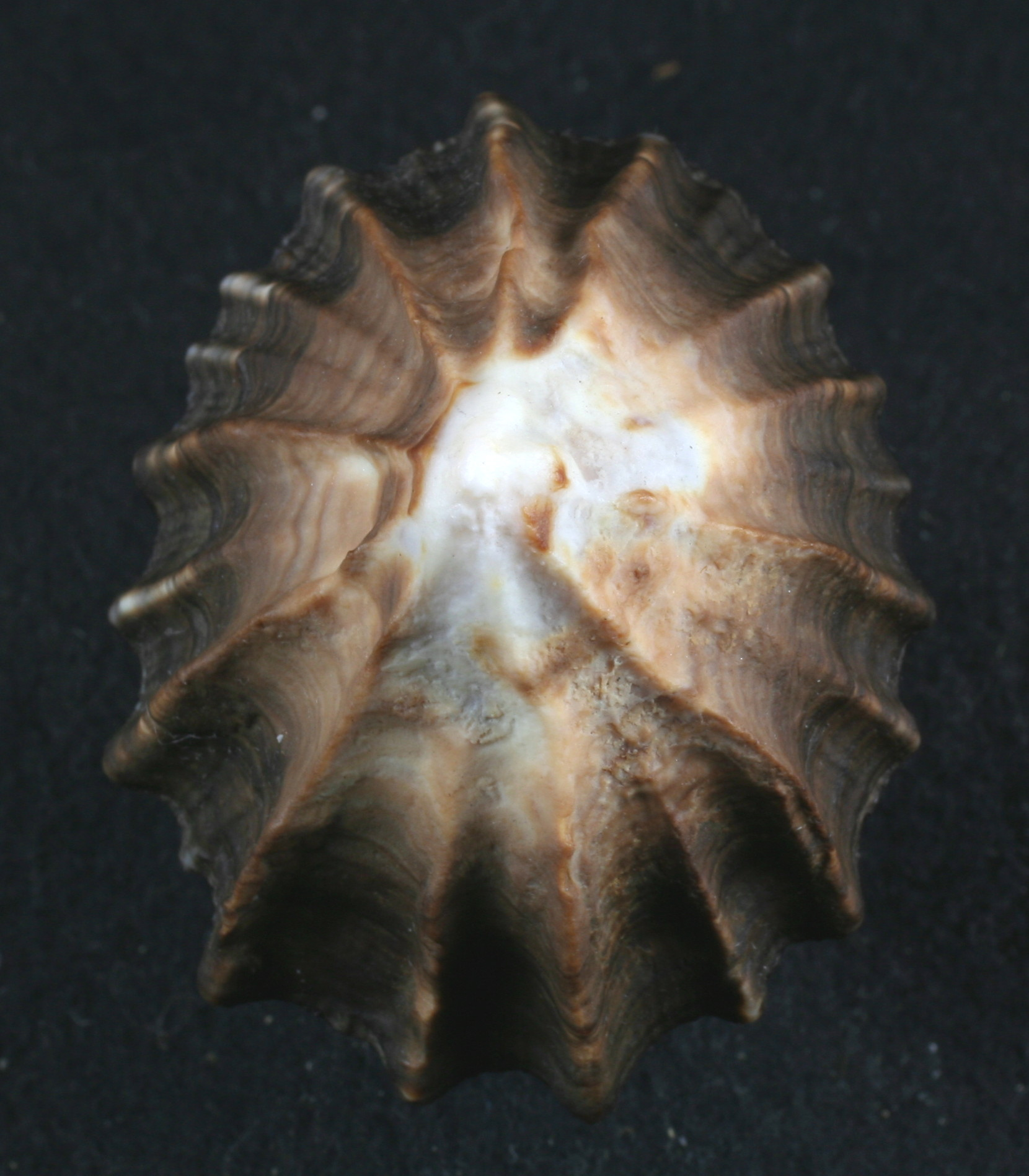
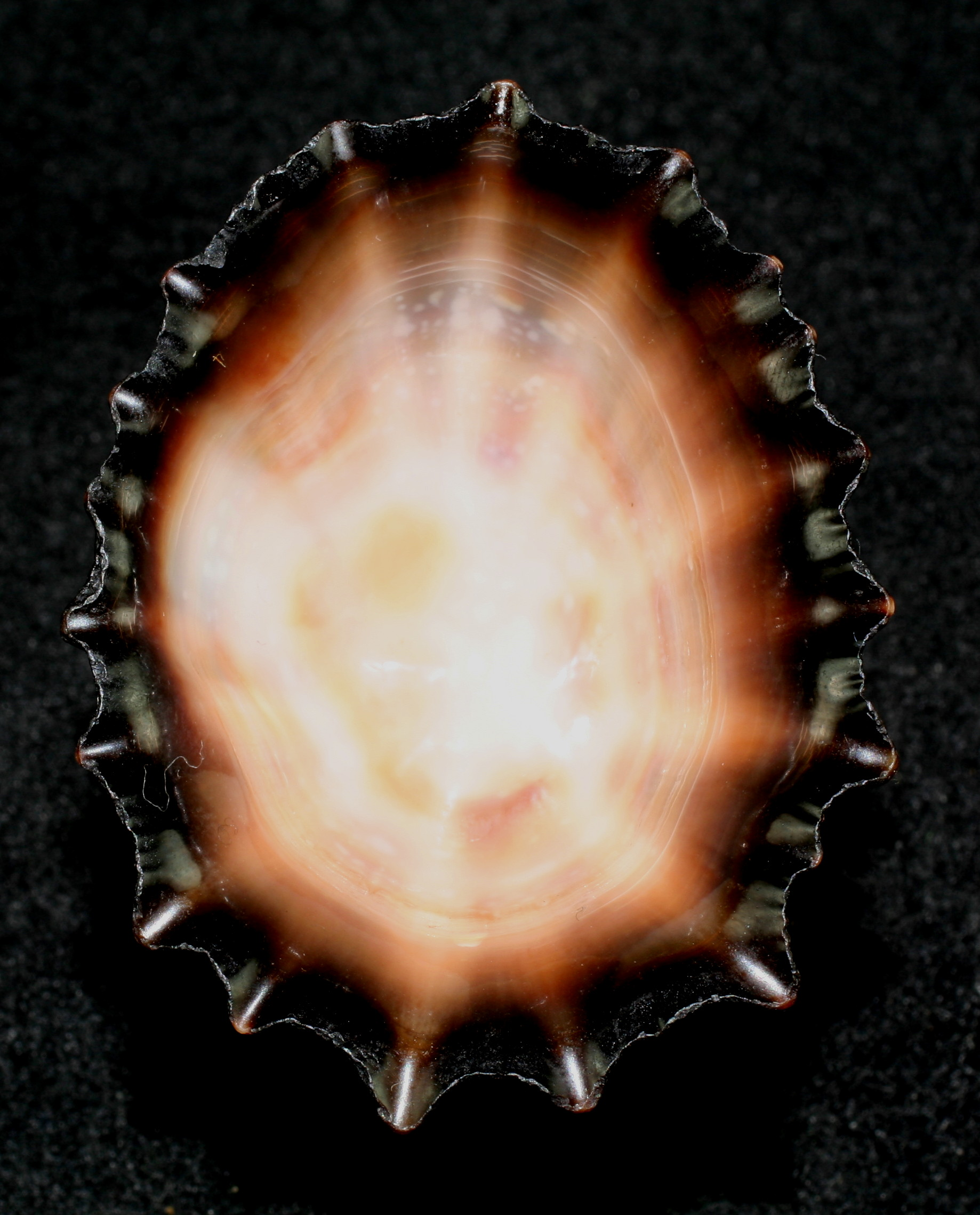
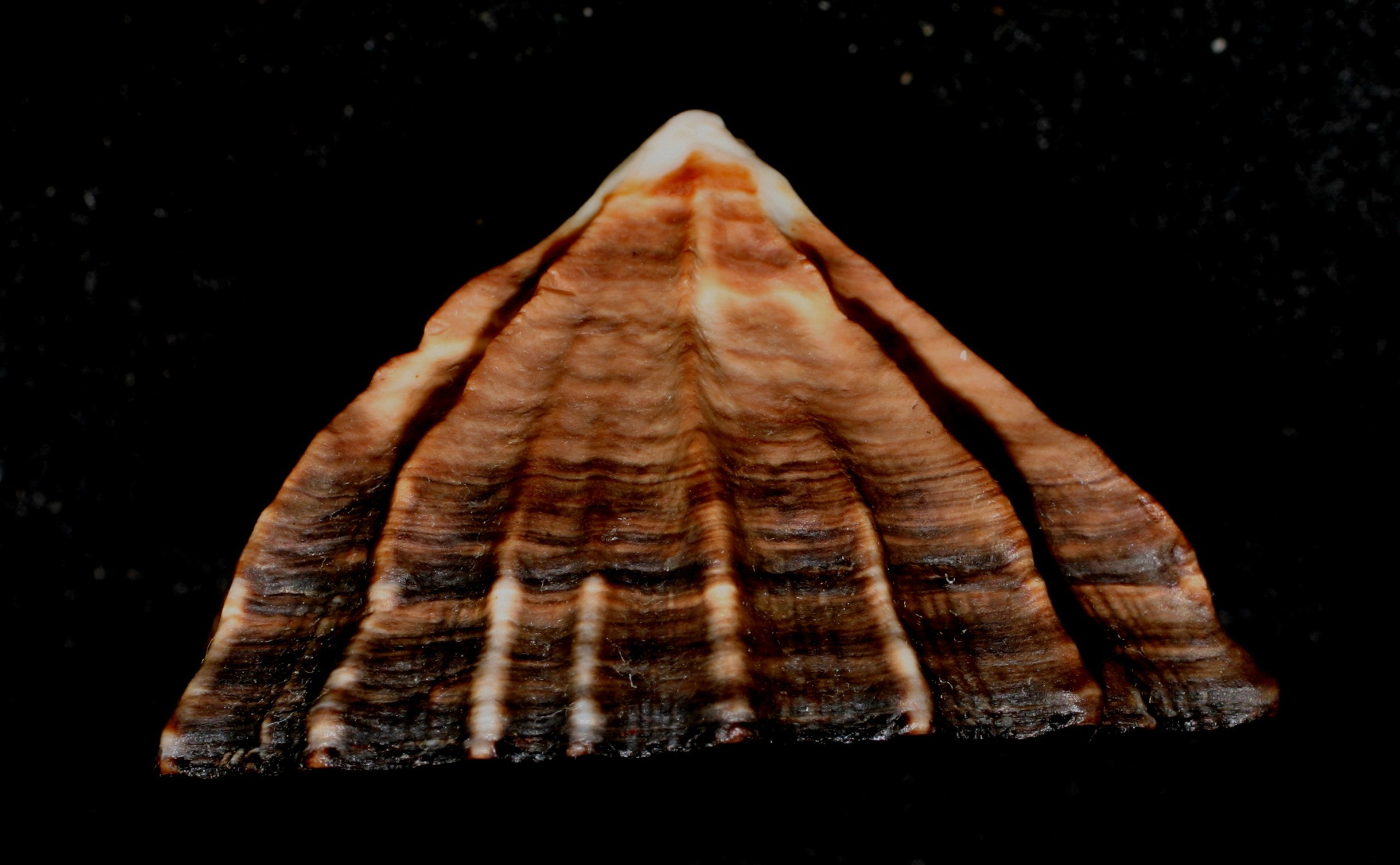
- Siphonaria gigas G.B. Sowerby I, 1825 Dorsal view of a shell of Siphonaria gigas G.B. Sowerby I, 1825 Apertural view of shell of Siphonaria gigas G.B. Sowerby I, 1825 Profile view of shell of Siphonaria gigas G.B. Sowerby I, 1825

= Siphonaria gigas =

Species of gastropod

Siphonaria gigas, common name the giant false limpet, is a species of air-breathing sea snail or false limpet, a marine pulmonate gastropod mollusc in the family Siphonariidae, the false limpets.

== Description ==
The size of the shell varies between 32 mm and 84 mm.

== Distribution ==
This marine species occurs off Acapulco, Mexico, to Northern Peru; off the Galápagos Islands.
