= Siphonaria compressa =

Conservation status
- Critically Endangered (IUCN 2.3)

Scientific classification
- Kingdom: Animalia
- Phylum: Mollusca
- Class: Gastropoda
- Order: Siphonariida
- Family: Siphonariidae
- Genus: Siphonaria
- Species: S. compressa

Binomial name
- Siphonaria compressa Allanson, 1958

Species of gastropod

Siphonaria compressa is a species of small, air-breathing sea snail. It is a pulmonate limpet, a gastropod in the Siphonariidae family.

== Distribution ==
It is endemic to South Africa.

A further site for this false limpet was discovered in 2004 in the Knysna River estuary (S34 03:E23 03) South Africa by Dr B. R. Allanson (the original describer of the species).

== Description ==
The length of the shell is 4-4.5 mm. It is the smallest species of Siphonariidae.

== Ecology ==
This small false limpet lives on the leaves of the marine plant, eelgrass.
