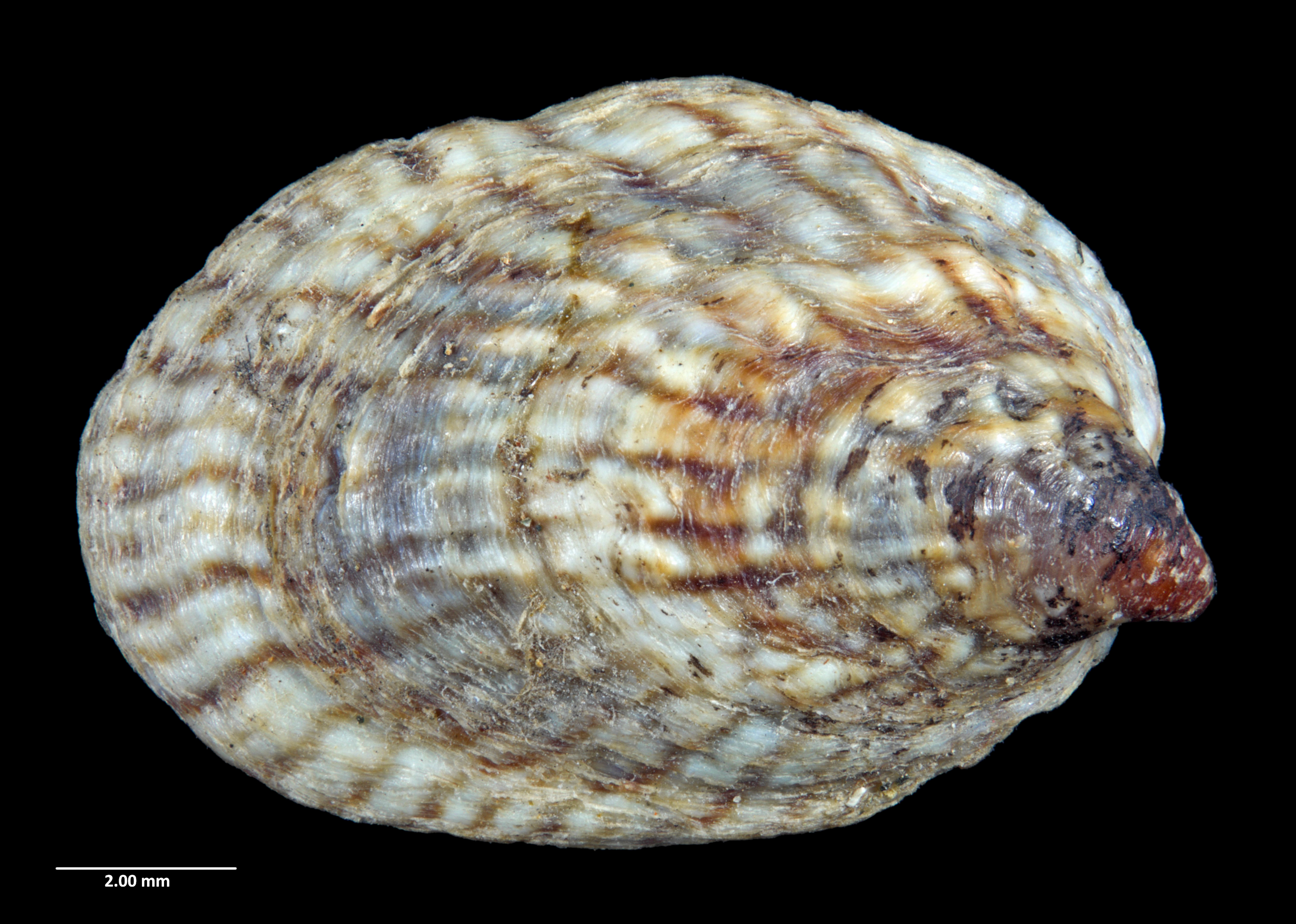
- Holotype from the collections of Auckland War Memorial Museum

Scientific classification
- Kingdom: Animalia
- Phylum: Mollusca
- Class: Gastropoda
- Order: Siphonariida
- Family: Siphonariidae
- Genus: Siphonaria
- Species: S. stewartiana

Binomial name
- Siphonaria stewartiana (Powell, 1939)

Synonyms
- Kerguelenella stewartiana (Powell, 1939); Siphonaria (Kerguelenella) stewartiana (Powell, 1939)

= Siphonaria stewartiana =

Species of gastropod

Siphonaria stewartiana is a species of air-breathing sea snail, a false limpet, a marine pulmonate gastropod mollusc in the family Siphonariidae, the false limpets.

== Distribution ==
This marine species is endemic to New Zealand and the Kerguelens
