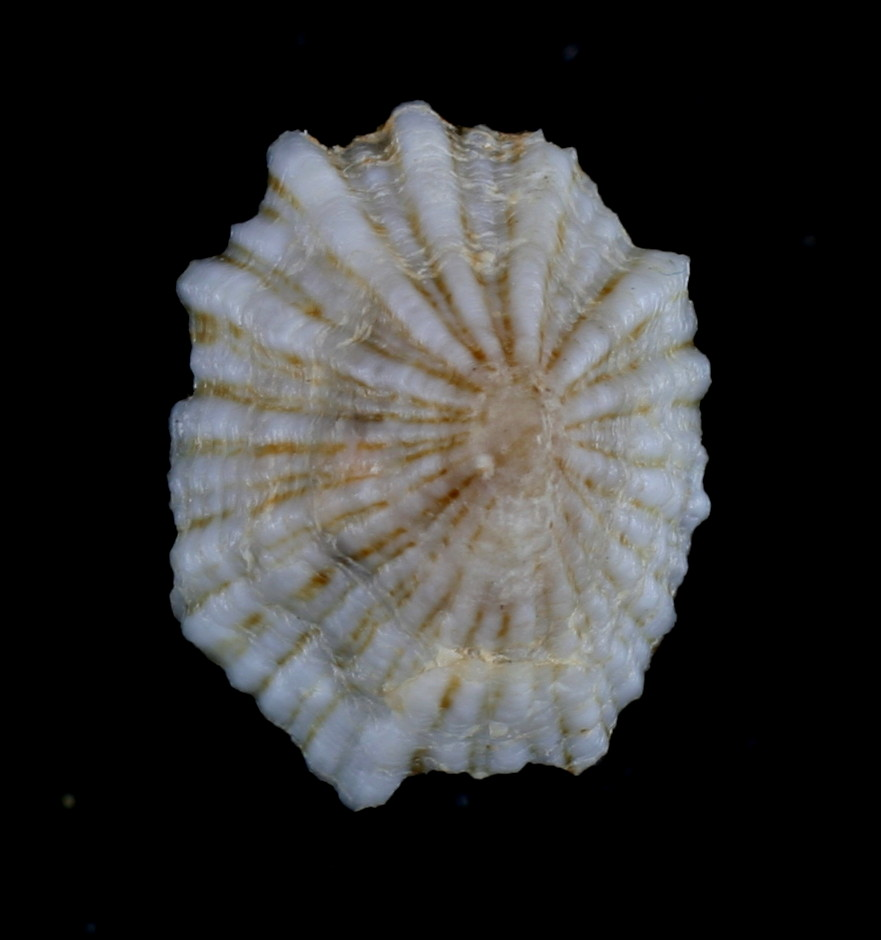
- Dorsal view of a shell of Siphonaria hispida Hubendick, 1946

Scientific classification
- Kingdom: Animalia
- Phylum: Mollusca
- Class: Gastropoda
- Order: Siphonariida
- Family: Siphonariidae
- Genus: Siphonaria
- Species: S. hispida

Binomial name
- Siphonaria hispida Hubendick, 1946

= Siphonaria hispida =

Species of gastropod

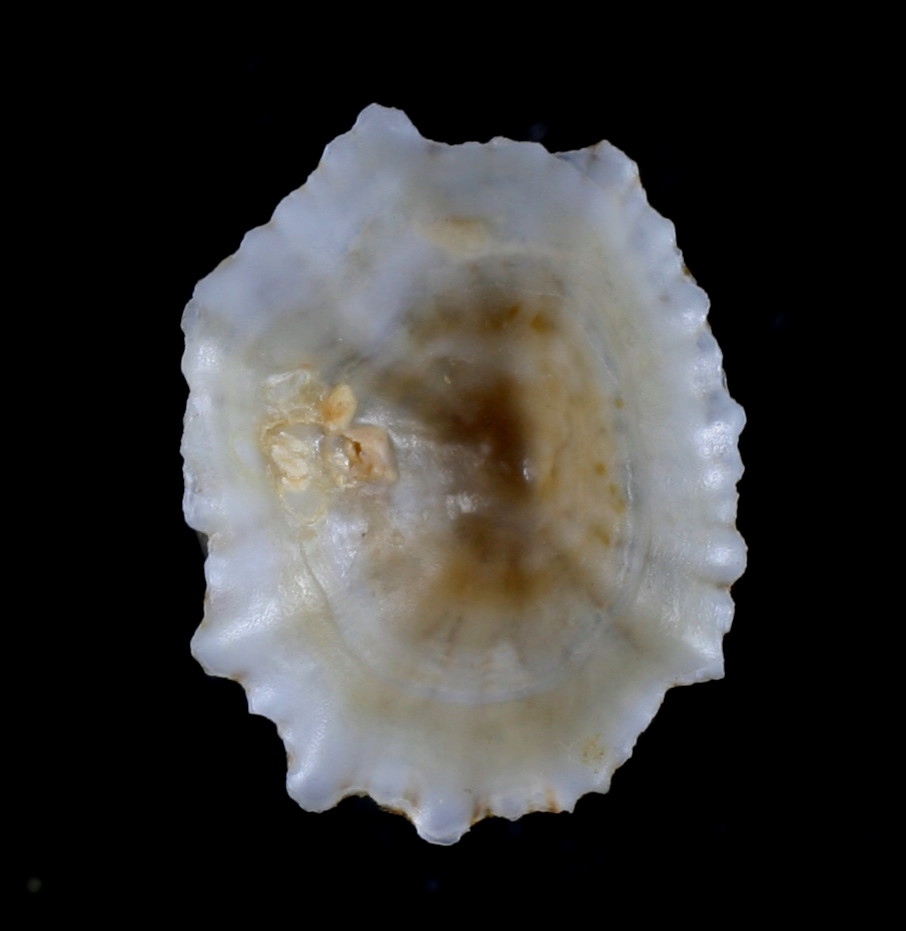
Apertural view of shell of Siphonaria hispida Hubendick, 1946

Siphonaria hispida is a species of air-breathing sea snail or false limpet, a marine pulmonate gastropod mollusc in the family Siphonariidae, the false limpets.
