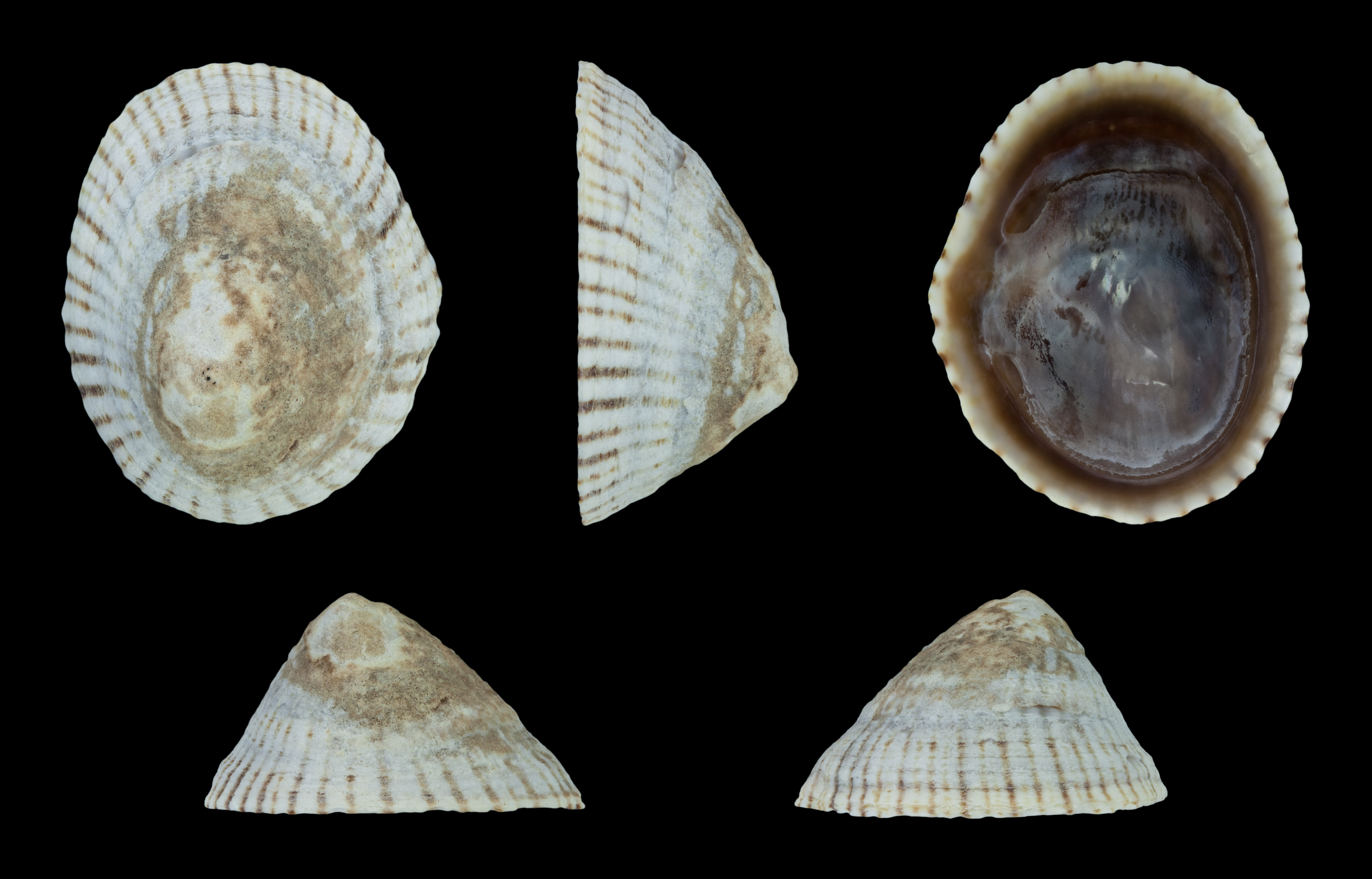

Scientific classification
- Kingdom: Animalia
- Phylum: Mollusca
- Class: Gastropoda
- Order: Siphonariida
- Family: Siphonariidae
- Genus: Siphonaria
- Species: S. lessonii

Binomial name
- Siphonaria lessonii Blainville, 1824

Synonyms
- Siphonaria antarctica Gould, 1852 Siphonaria magellanica Philippi, 1855

= Siphonaria lessonii =

Species of gastropod

Siphonaria lessonii, is a species of air-breathing sea snail or false limpet, a marine pulmonate gastropod mollusc in the family Siphonariidae, the false limpets.

== Distribution ==
This marine species occurs from Rocha (Uruguay) to Cape Horn and the Malvinas (Falkland) Islands in the Atlantic Ocean, through the Beagle Channel and Magellan Strait, north to Chiloé Island (Chile) in the Pacific Ocean. Published references extend the distributional range of this species to Santa Catarina, Brazil, in the Atlantic Ocean (Rios, 1994) and to Paita, Peru, in the Pacific (Morrison, 1963), with an additional report from Nicaragua (Dall, 1909); however, these records require confirmation.

== Description ==
The length of the shell attains 16.5 mm.

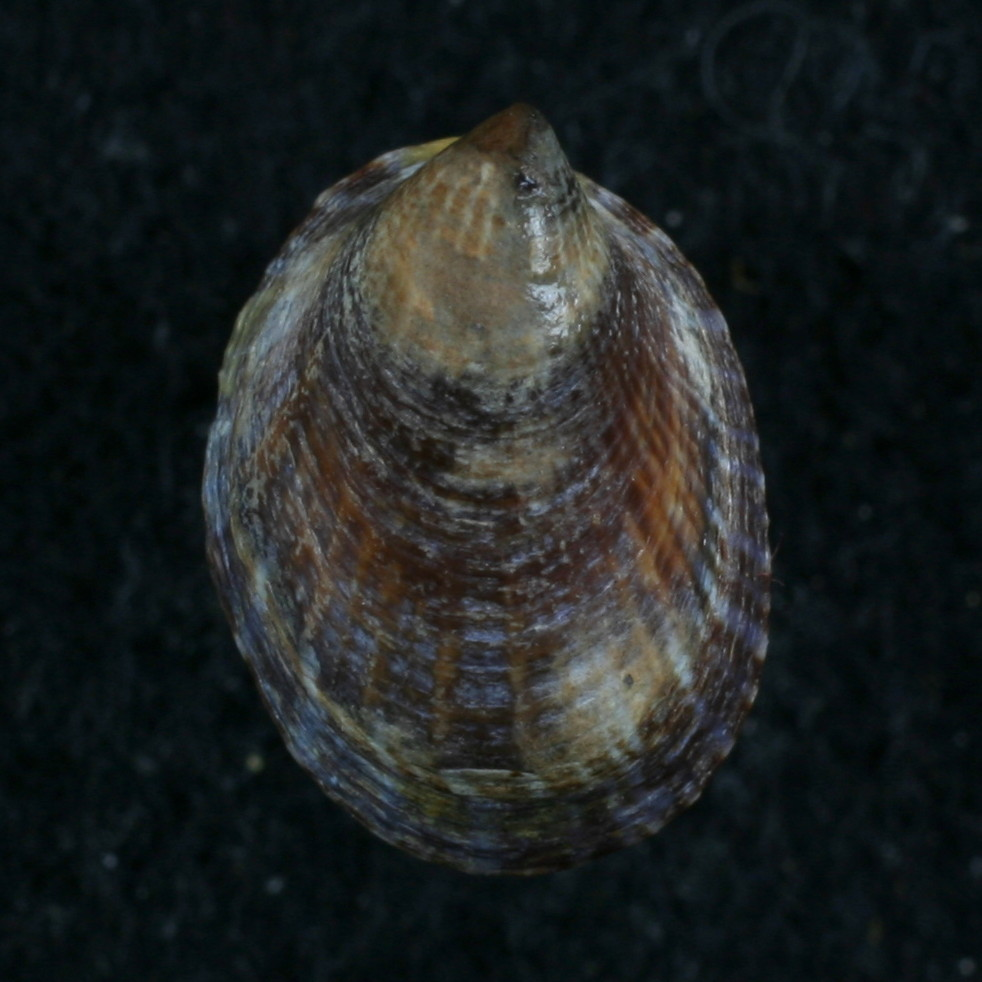
Dorsal view.

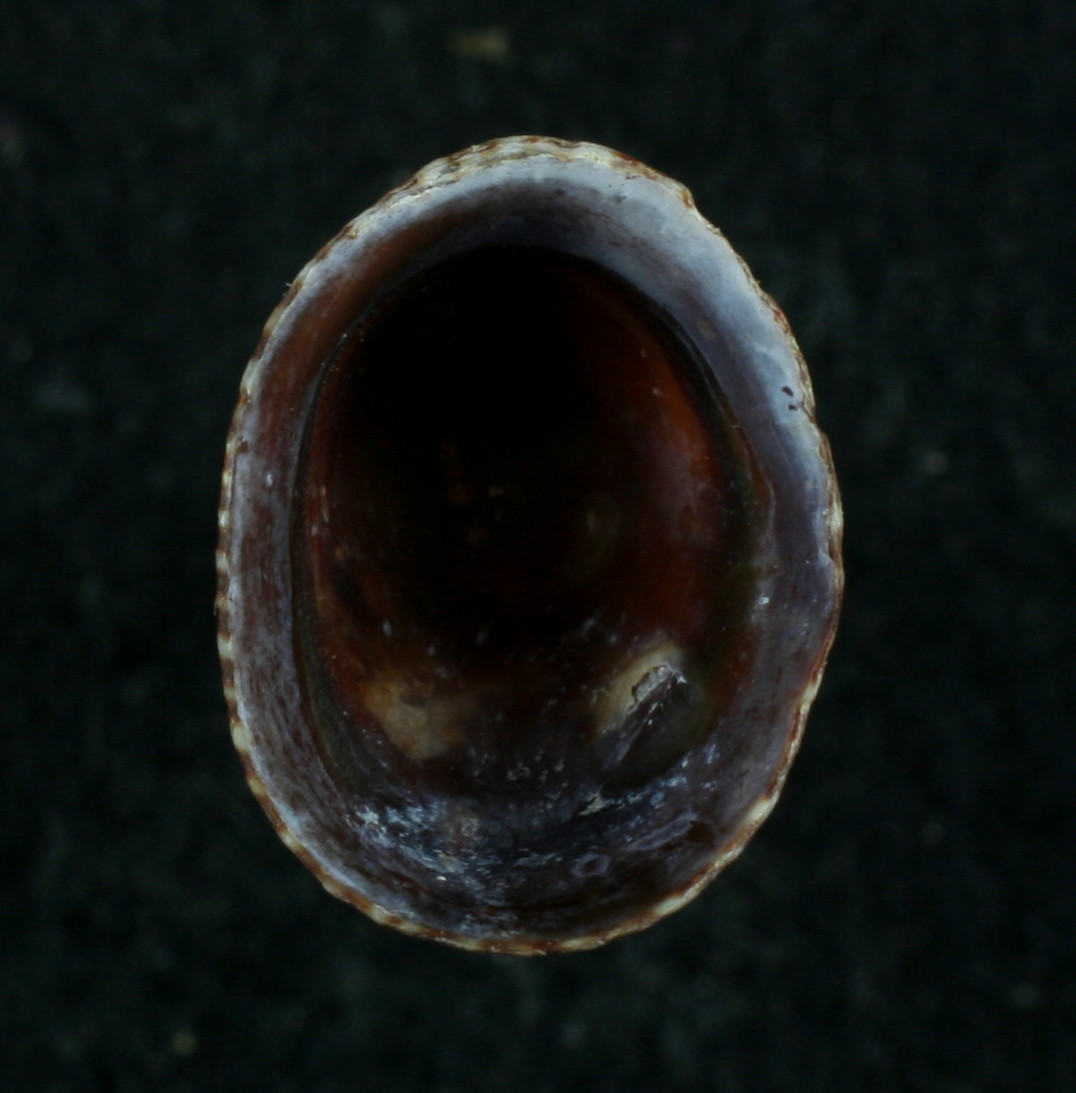
Apertural view.

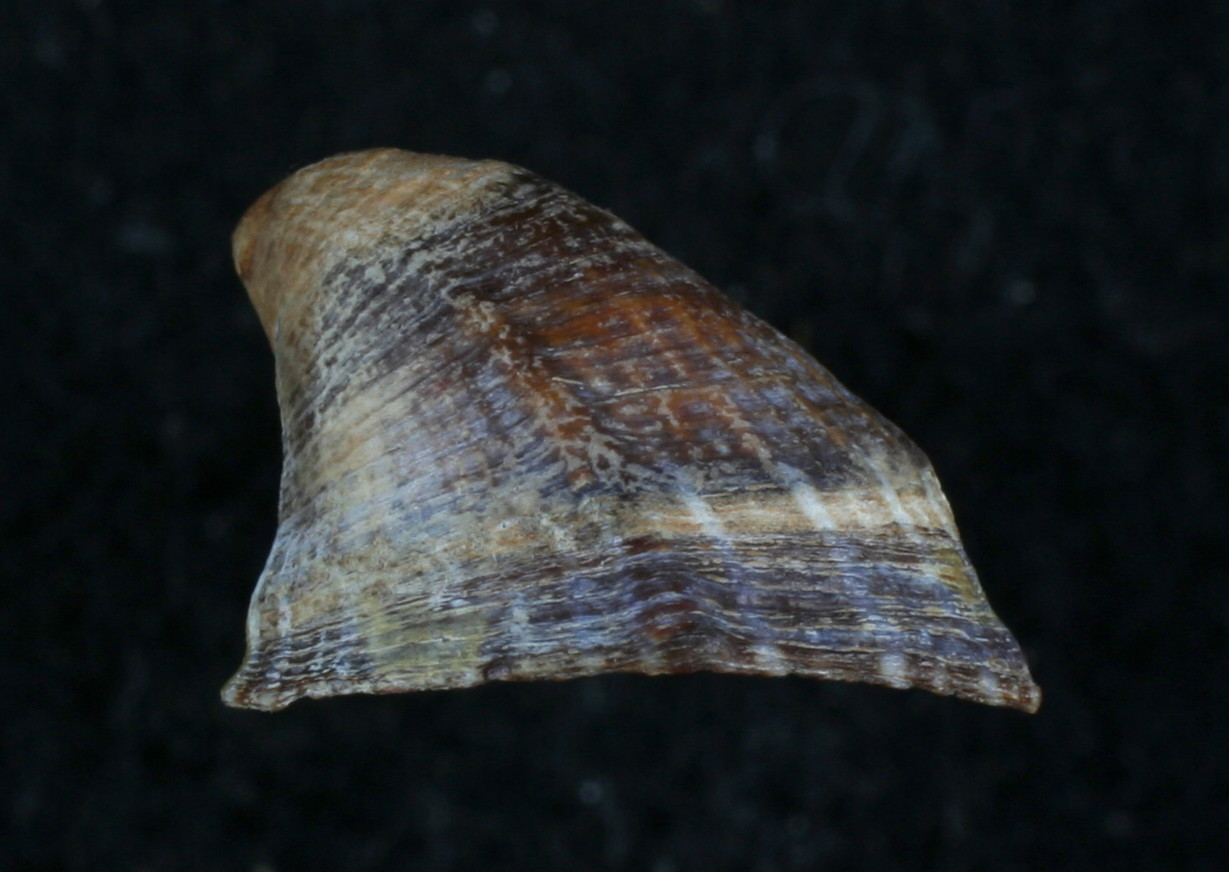
Lateral view.
