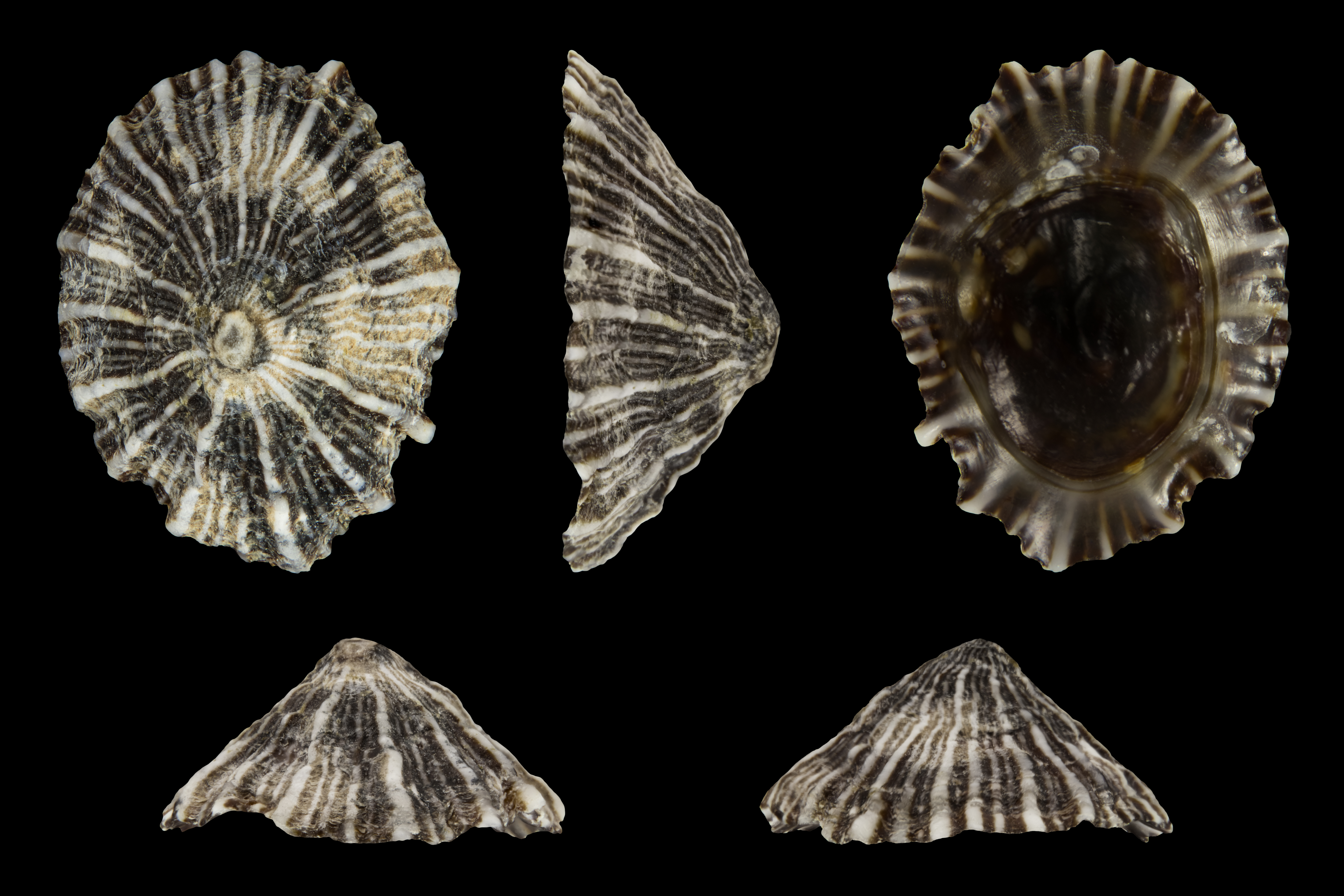
- A shell of Siphonaria normalis Gould, 1846

Scientific classification
- Kingdom: Animalia
- Phylum: Mollusca
- Class: Gastropoda
- Order: Siphonariida
- Family: Siphonariidae
- Genus: Siphonaria
- Species: S. normalis

Binomial name
- Siphonaria normalis Gould, 1846

= Siphonaria normalis =

Species of gastropod

The False 'Opihi or False limpet otherwise known as Siphonaria normalis is an air breathing sea snail that shares its appearance with true limpets. 'Opihi means limpet in Hawaiian. They are part of the Order of Siphonariidae which are known as false limpets. They live in the mid to upper rocky intertidal zone along the coastlines and can be found throughout the Indo-Pacific regions.

== Description ==
These False limpets have a ribbed shell with a brown and white coloration. They can reach a maximum length of 20mm, but it is usually less than that size in Hawaii.

== Reproduction ==
They lay egg masses, in a spiral formation. When the eggs hatch, the Siphonaria normalis are then in the juvenile stage of their life.

== Ecology ==
Siphonaria normalis or False 'Opihi are grazers that generally consume algae along the rocky intertidal zones. The variety of algae consumed consists of lichens, cyanobacteria, diatoms, microalgae, and foliose macroalgae. As our climate continues to get warmer it causes thermal stress and mortality among the Siphonaria normalis.

== Habitat and distribution ==
Siphonaria normalis has a wide range in distribution throughout the Indo-Pacific. It lives in the rocky intertidal zones along the coastline of these regions. They do not live under the water, but need to be in areas that are wet constantly from the ocean.

== Cultural significance ==
The False 'Opihi was found to occasionally be harvested and consumed by the ancient Hawaiians.
