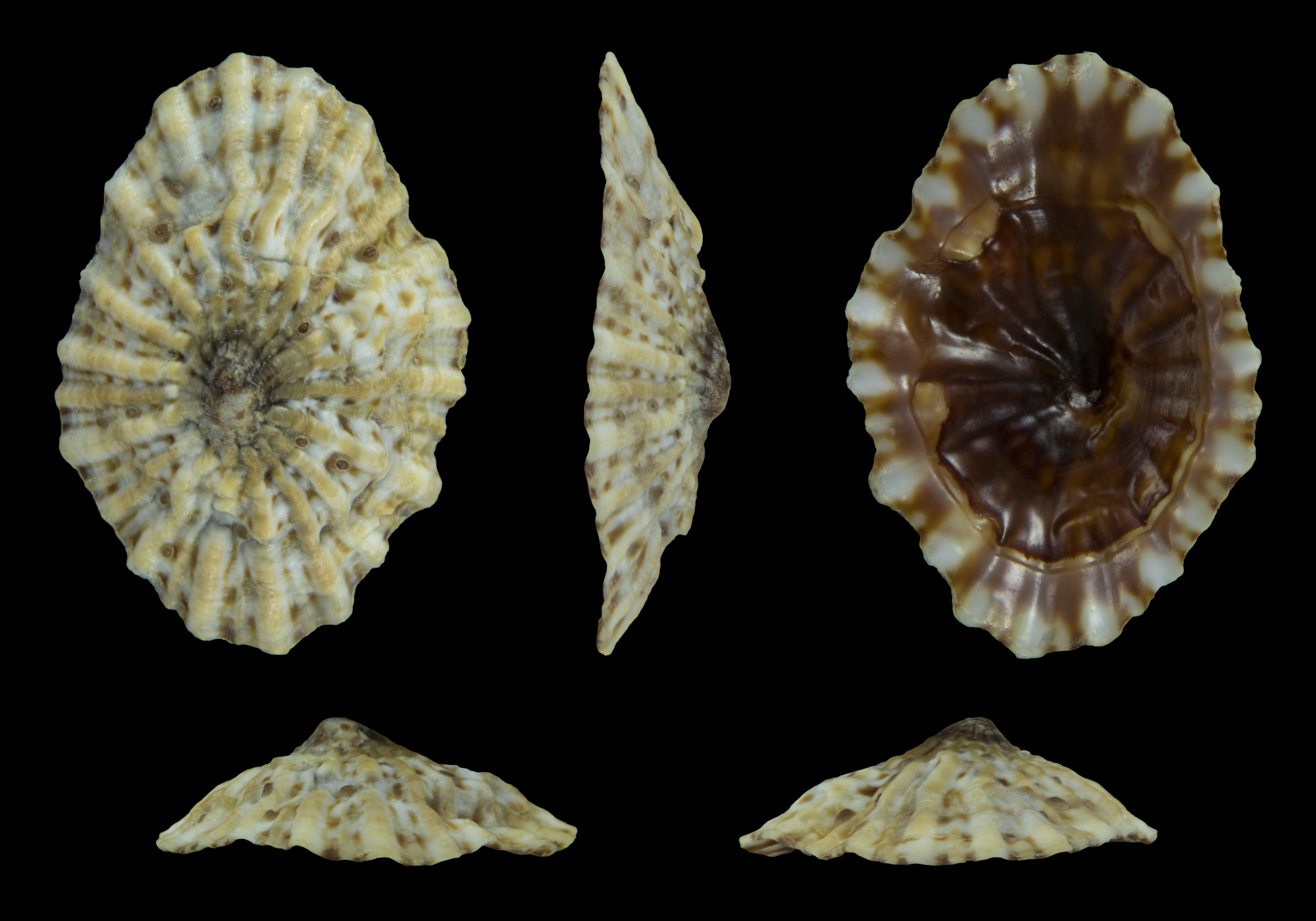
- Japanese false limpet; length 1.8 cm; Originating from Nada, Wakayama Prefecture, Japan

Scientific classification
- Kingdom: Animalia
- Phylum: Mollusca
- Class: Gastropoda
- Order: Siphonariida
- Family: Siphonariidae
- Genus: Siphonaria
- Species: S. japonica

Binomial name
- Siphonaria japonica (Donovan, 1824)

Synonyms
- Patella japonica Donovan, 1824

= Siphonaria japonica =

Species of mollusc

Siphonaria japonica, the Japanese false limpet, is a species of air-breathing sea snail or false limpet in the family Siphonariidae.

== Description ==
Siphonaria japonica has a hard, thick shell with a pale yellow or brown color. There are greater than 20 radial ribs that are uniform in thickness. The siphonal ridge is underdeveloped and directly discernible from neither inside nor outside of the shell.

== Distribution ==
Siphonaria japonica is found along the coasts of Japan, Korea, Taiwan, and China.

== Habitat ==
Siphonaria japonica is predominantly found along rocky intertidal shores. The false limpet can also be found on man-made constructions such as bridges and pilings. S. japonica tends to follow tidal movement. It typically moves with the tide just before or after being exposed to air. Similar to other limpets and false limpets, S. japonica returns to their home site while it is still damp.
