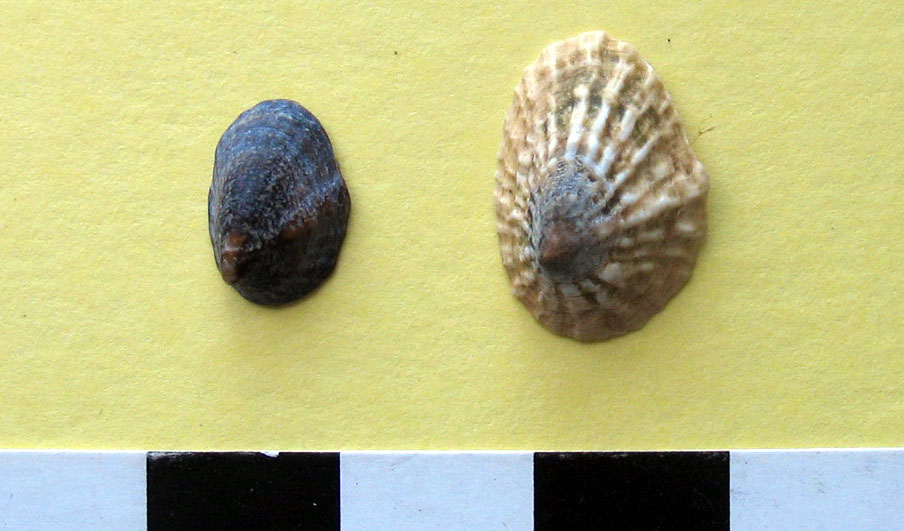
- Kerguelenella lateralis

Scientific classification
- Kingdom: Animalia
- Phylum: Mollusca
- Class: Gastropoda
- Order: Siphonariida
- Family: Siphonariidae
- Genus: Kerguelenella; Powell, 1946

Synonyms
- Kerguelenia Rochebrune & Mabille, 1889 (preoccupied by Kerguelenia Stebbing, 1888 (Amphipoda))

= Kerguelenella =

Genus of gastropods

Kerguelenella is a genus of air-breathing sea snails, marine pulmonate gastropod molluscs in the family Siphonariidae, the false limpets.

== Distribution ==
Species in this genus live in Patagonia, South Georgia, Kerguelen Islands, Macquarie Islands, and New Zealand's Stewart island and sub-Antarctic islands.

== Species ==
Species within the genus Kerguelenella include:

- Kerguelenella innominata (Iredale, 1915)
- Kerguelenella lateralis (Gould, 1846)
- Kerguelenella stewartiana (Powell, 1939)
