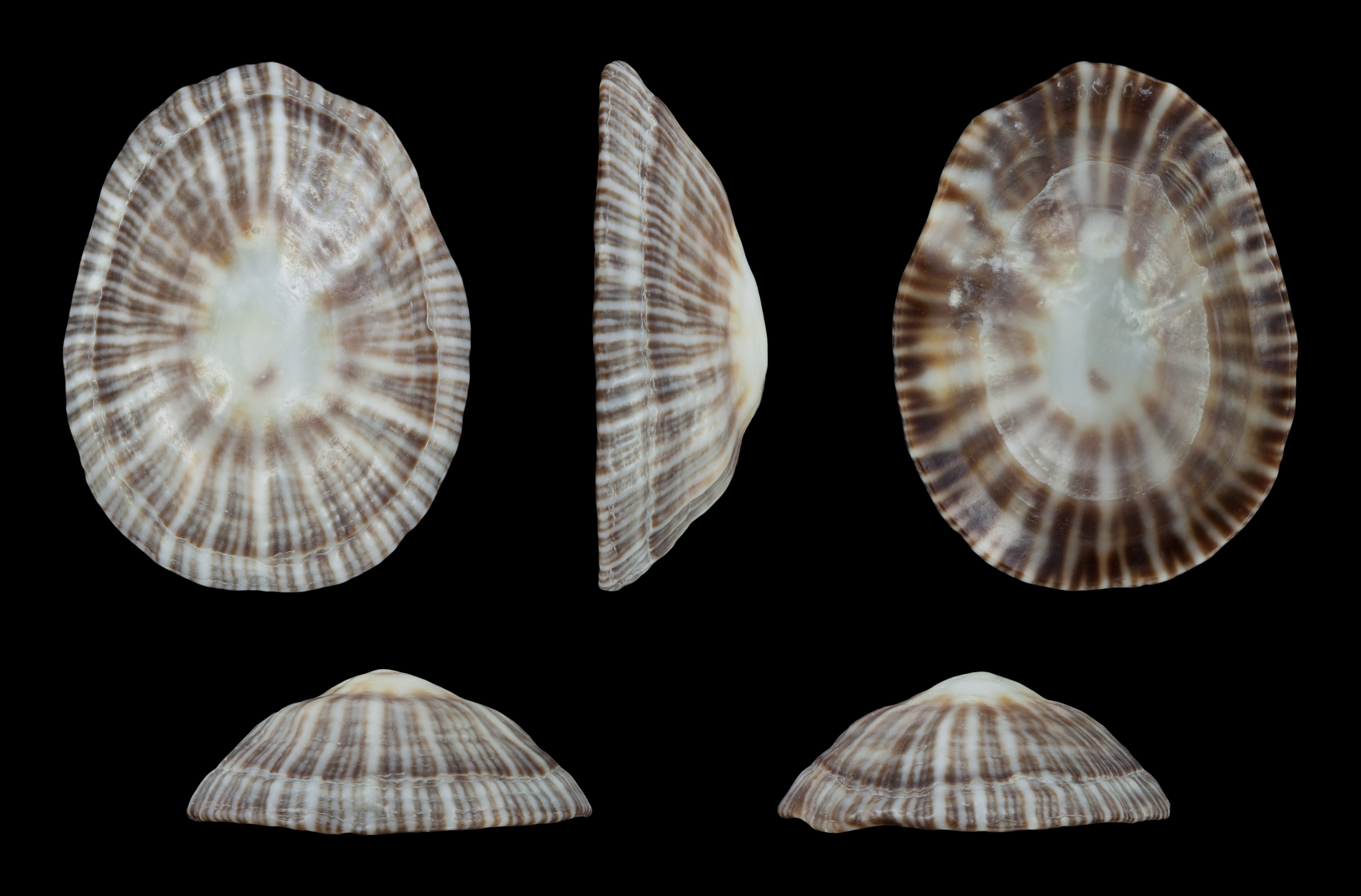
- Siphonaria pectinata

Scientific classification
- Kingdom: Animalia
- Phylum: Mollusca
- Class: Gastropoda
- Order: Siphonariida
- Family: Siphonariidae
- Genus: Siphonaria
- Species: S. pectinata

Binomial name
- Siphonaria pectinata (Linnaeus, 1758)

Synonyms
- Mouretus adansonii Blainville, 1824; Patella pectinata Linnaeus, 1758 (original combination); Siphonaria adansonii Blainville, 1827; Siphonaria algesirae Quoy & Gaimard, 1832; Siphonaria algesirae var. depressa Locard, 1898; Siphonaria grisea (Gmelin, 1791); Siphonaria jonasi Dunker, 1853; Siphonaria mouret Sowerby G.B. I, 1825; Siphonaria mouret var. conica Pallary, 1900; Siphonaria mouret var. minor Pallary, 1900; Siphonaria mouret var. nigra Pallary, 1900; Siphonaria mouretus Blainville, 1824; Siphonaria striatocostata Dunker, 1846

= Siphonaria pectinata =

Species of gastropod

Siphonaria pectinata, common name the striped false limpet, is a species of air-breathing sea snail or false limpet, a marine heterobranch gastropod mollusc in the family Siphonariidae.

== Taxonomic status ==
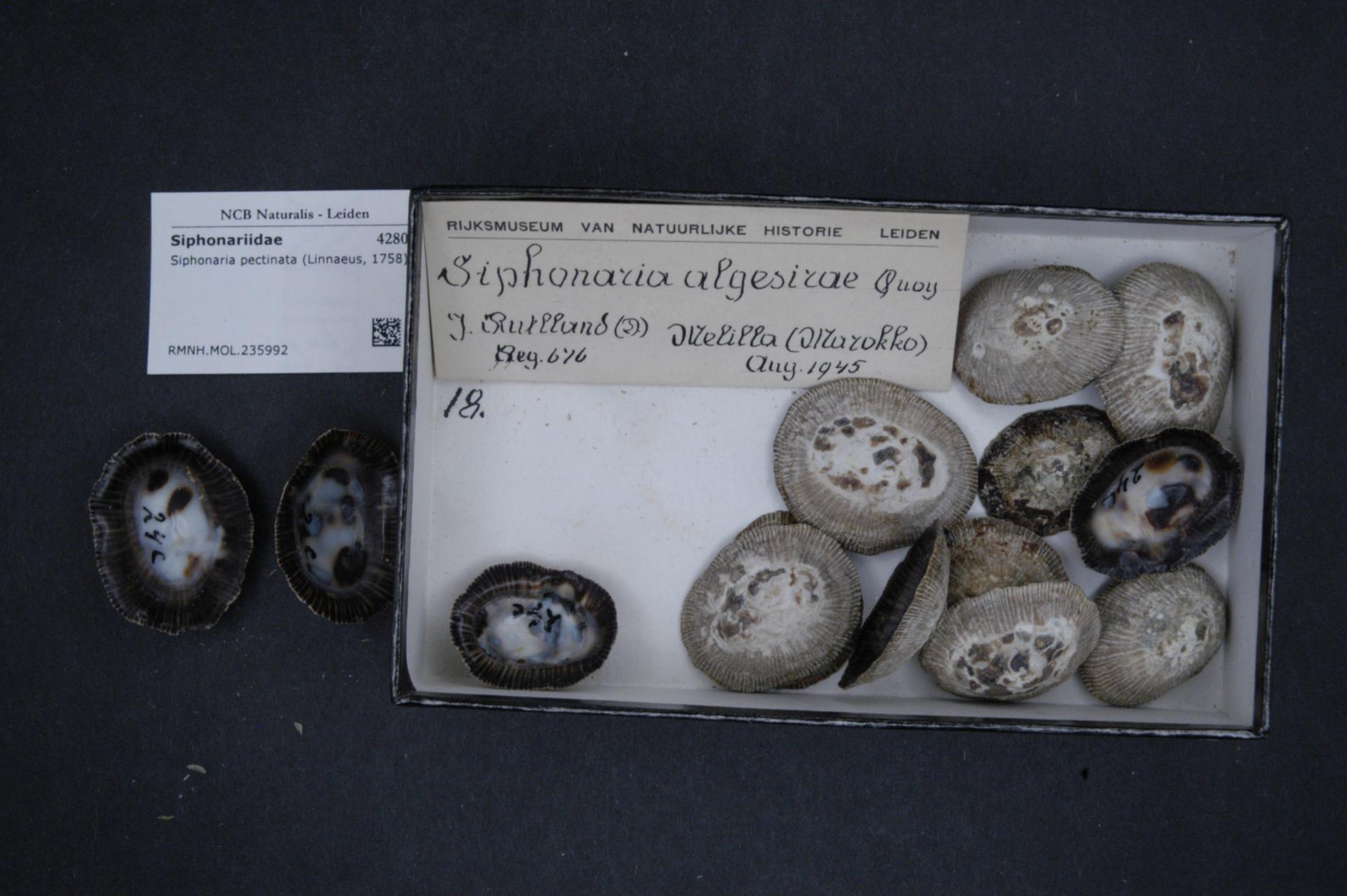
Siphonaria pectinata (Linnaeus, 1758). Museum specimens, Naturalis

Siphonaria pectinata (Linnaeus, 1758) was thought to be a widespread species with an Amphiatlantic distribution. A 2015 molecular study clearly distinguished three lineages with no apparent connectivity. These lineages are now treated as three separate species. They are named as S. pectinata, restricted to the eastern Atlantic and Mediterranean, S. naufragum (Stearns, 1872) from Florida and the Gulf of Mexico and S. placentula Menke, 1853 from the Cape Verde Archipelago.

The complete nucleotide sequence of the mitochondrial genome of Siphonaria pectinata has been available since 2008. As a result of this study, Grande et al. (2008) proposed that this species should be recognized as a member of the Opisthobranchia rather than the Pulmonata. It is now known that the Pulmonata are actually a group within the former Opisthobranchia and the term Heterobranchia is usually used to clarify this relationship.

== Distribution ==
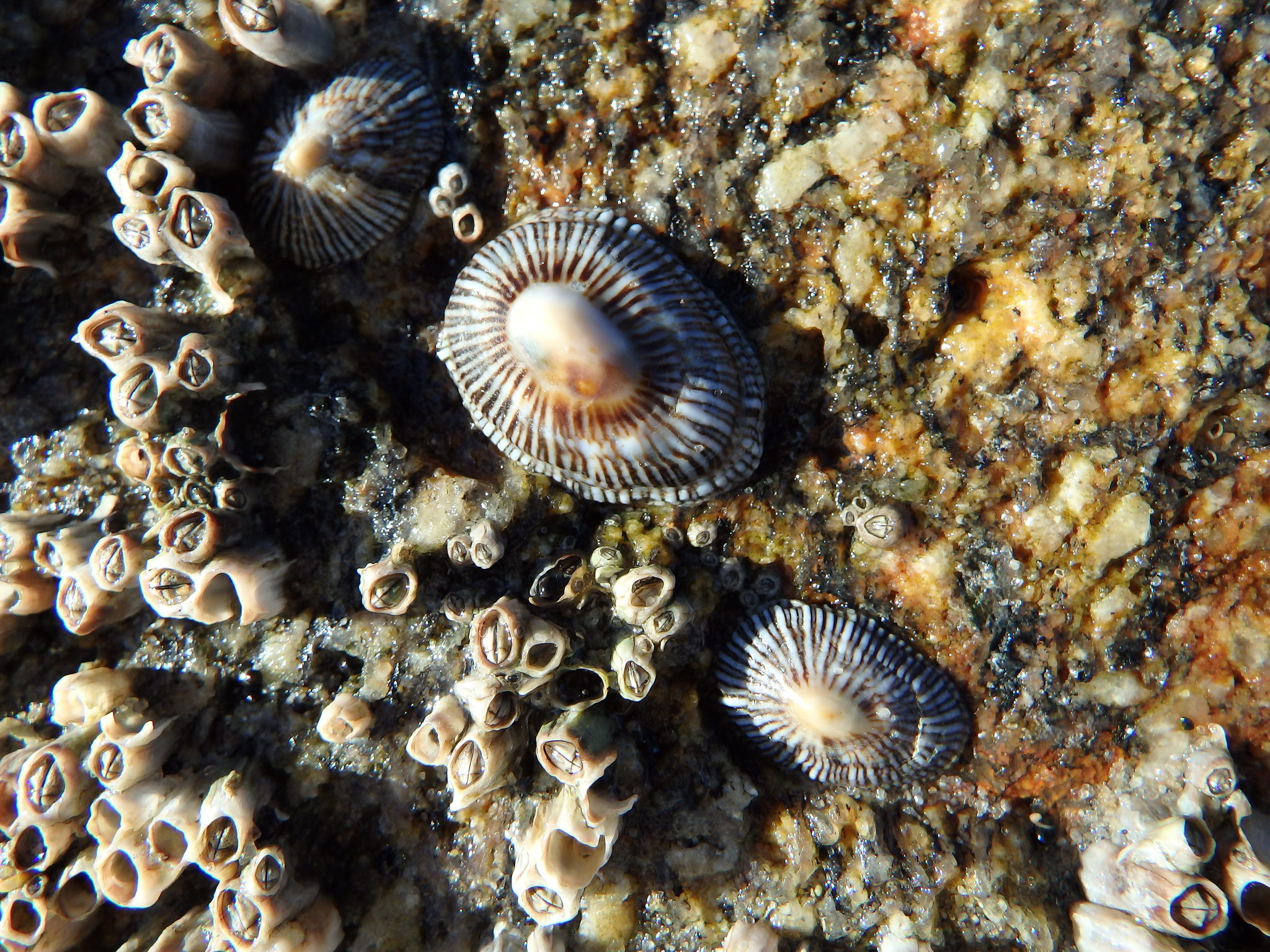
Striped false limpet in Ílhavo, Portugal

This species lives high in the intertidal zone on rocky shores in the North Atlantic Ocean, and the Mediterranean Sea. Populations in the Gulf of Mexico, Florida and the Florida Keys are now known to belong to the sibling species, Siphonaria naufragum.
