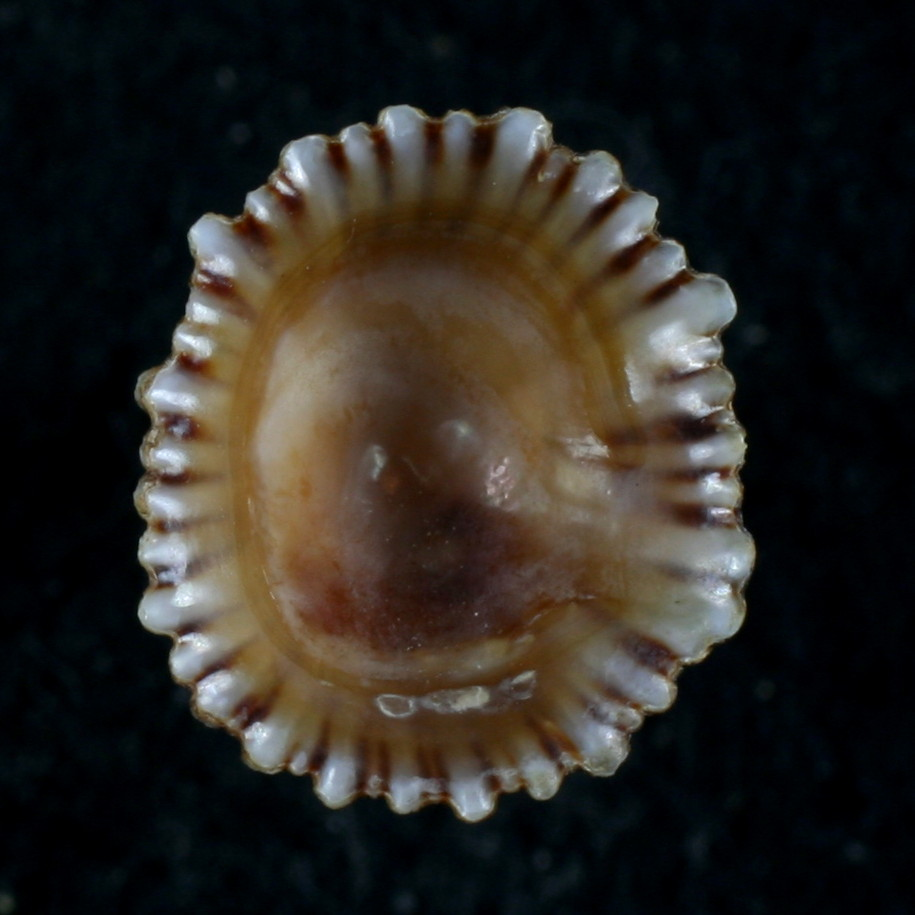
- Apertural view of a shell of Siphonaria diemenensis Quoy & Gaimard, 1833

Scientific classification
- Kingdom: Animalia
- Phylum: Mollusca
- Class: Gastropoda
- Order: Siphonariida
- Family: Siphonariidae
- Genus: Siphonaria
- Species: S. diemenensis

Binomial name
- Siphonaria diemenensis Quoy & Gaimard, 1833

= Siphonaria diemenensis =

Species of gastropod

Siphonaria diemenensis, is a species of air-breathing sea snail or false limpet, a marine pulmonate gastropod mollusc in the family Siphonariidae, the false limpets.

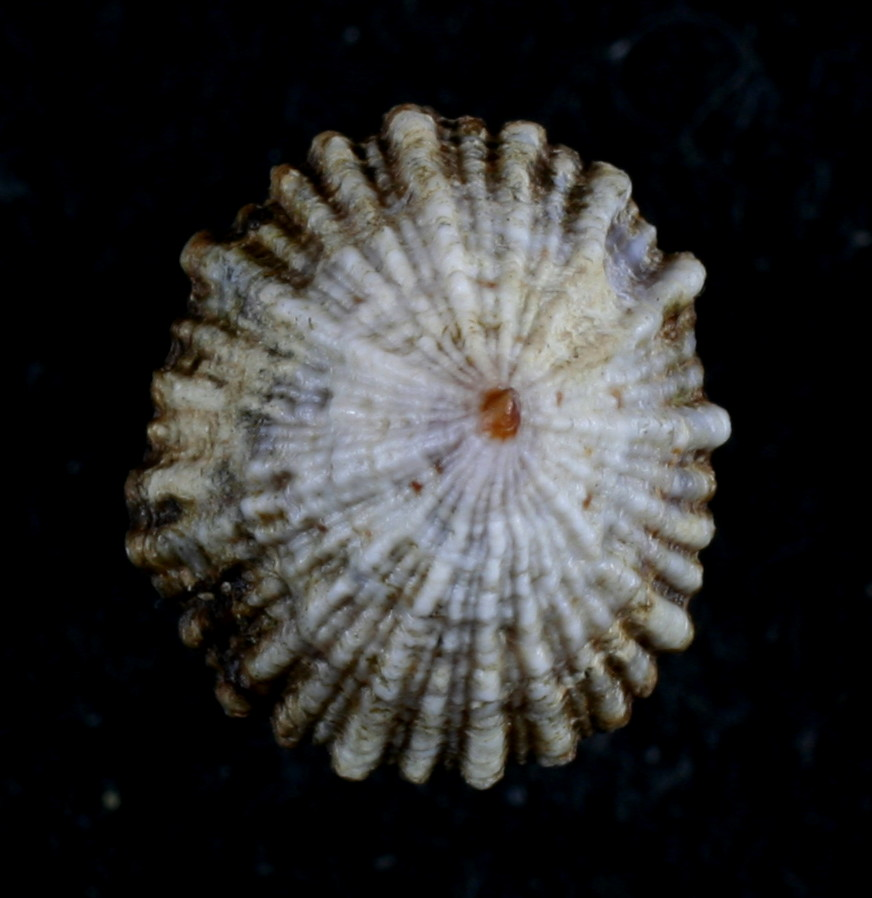
Dorsal view of shell of Siphonaria diemenensis Quoy & Gaimard, 1833

== Description ==
The length of the shell attains 23.1 mm.

== Distribution ==
This marine species occurs off Tasmania.
