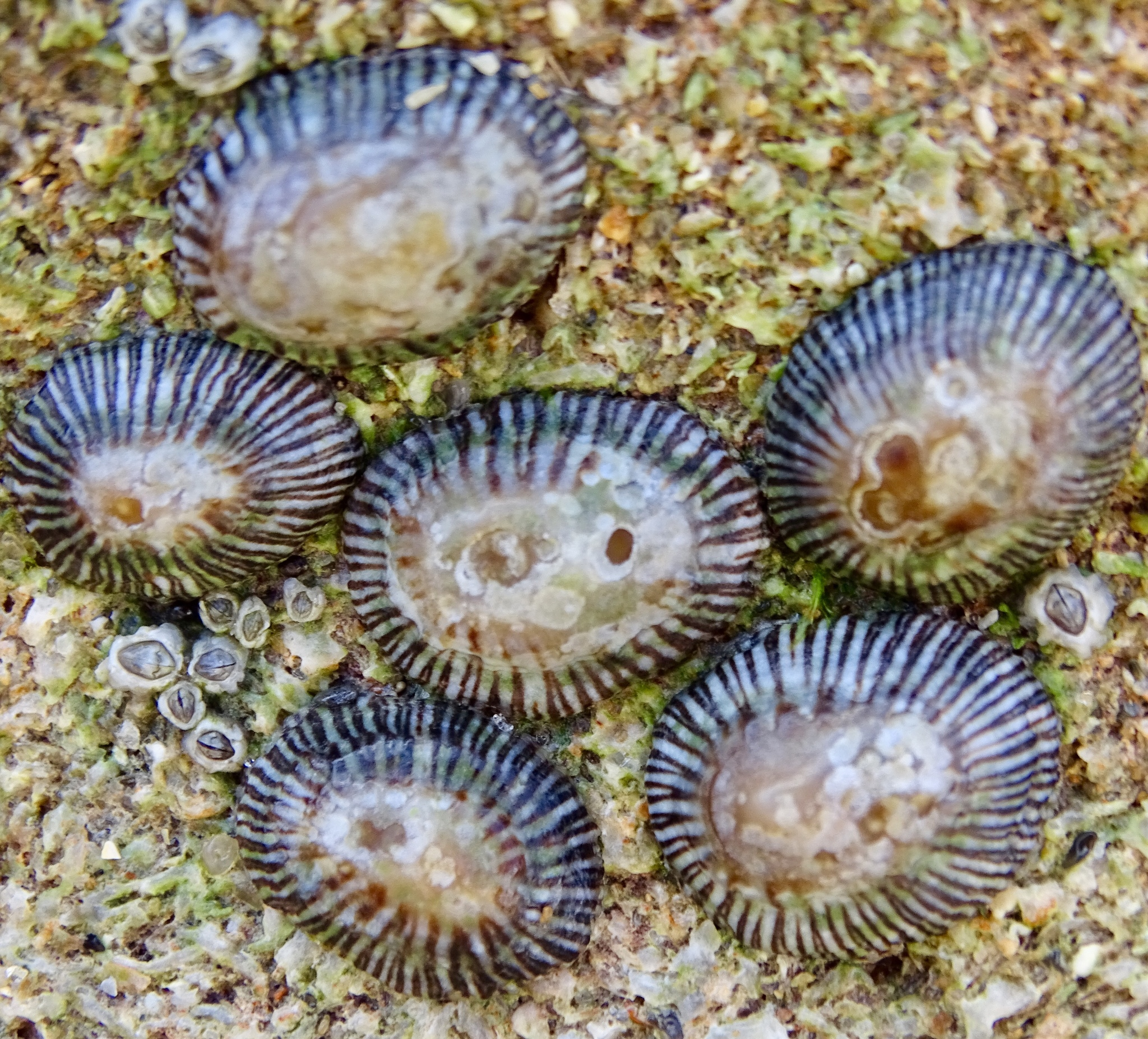

Scientific classification
- Kingdom: Animalia
- Phylum: Mollusca
- Class: Gastropoda
- Order: Siphonariida
- Family: Siphonariidae
- Genus: Siphonaria
- Species: S. naufragum

Binomial name
- Siphonaria naufragum (Stearns, 1872)

= Siphonaria naufragum =

Species of mollusc

Siphonaria naufragum is a species of air-breathing sea snail, or false limpet, a marine heterobranch gastropod mollusc in the family Siphonariidae.

== Distribution ==
It is found in intertidal zones of rocky shores within Florida, the Florida Keys, and the Gulf of Mexico.

== Taxonomic status ==
Siphonaria naufragum was initially thought to be a widespread species with an amphiatlantic distribution, Siphonaria pectinata (Linnaeus, 1758). A 2015 molecular study clearly distinguished three lineages with no apparent connectivity. These lineages are now treated as three separate species. The S. pectinata is restricted to the eastern Atlantic and Mediterranean, S. naufragum (Stearns, 1872) from Florida (and Keys) and the Gulf of Mexico, and S. placentula Menke, 1853 from the Cape Verde Archipelago.

== Gallery ==
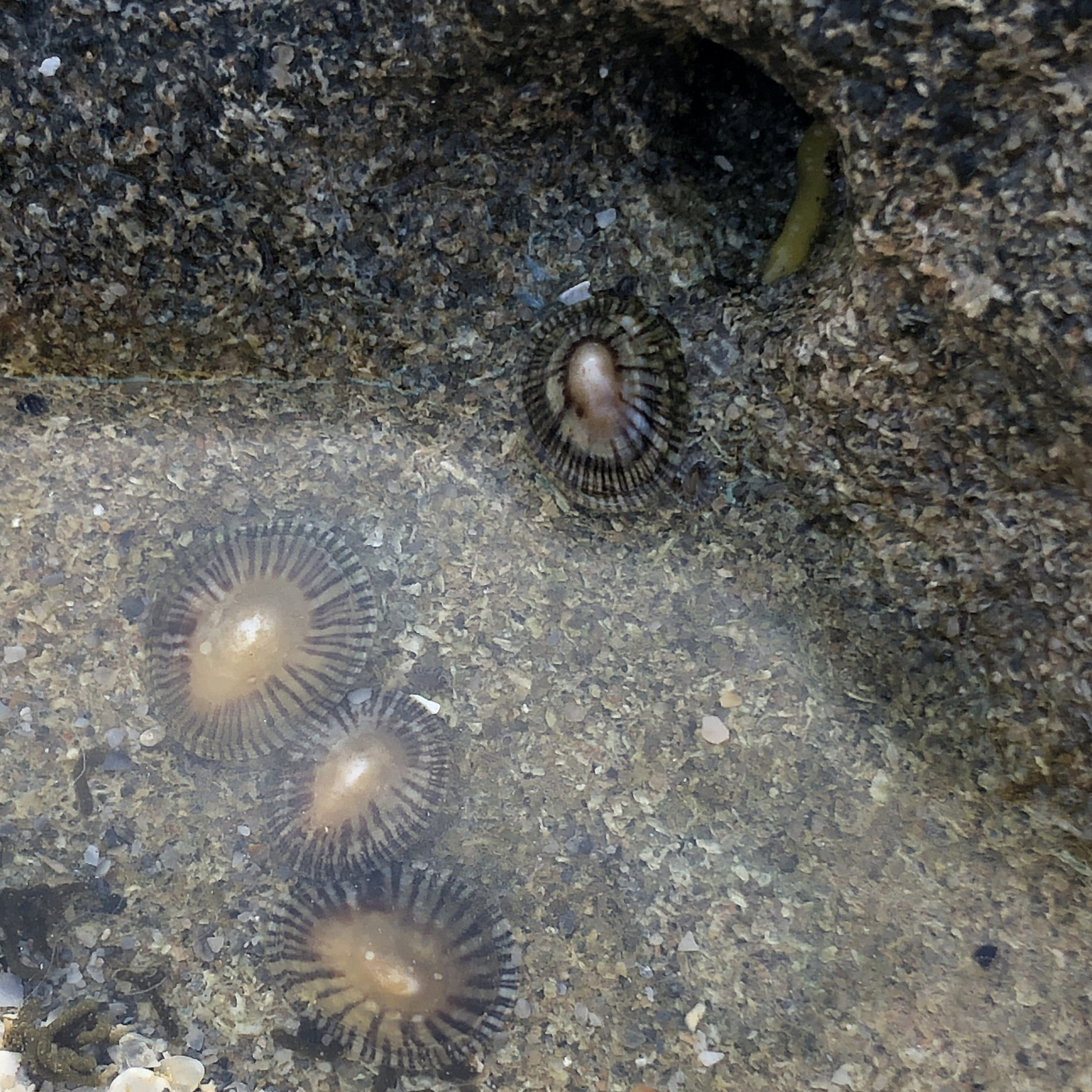
Siphonaria naufragum (bottom left / middle) and eggs (yellow bit in hole on the top right)
