= Williamia radiata =

Scientific classification
- Kingdom: Animalia
- Phylum: Mollusca
- Class: Gastropoda
- Order: Siphonariida
- Family: Siphonariidae
- Genus: Williamia
- Species: W. radiata

Binomial name
- Williamia radiata (Pease, 1861)

Synonyms
- Capulus nutatus Hedley, 1908; Roya kermadecensis Iredale, 1912; Tectura radiata Pease, 1861; Williamia japonica Habe, 1962; Williamia kermadecensis (Iredale, 1912); Williamia nutata (Hedley, 1908); Williamia polynesica Rehder, 1980; Williamia radiata Kuroda & Habe, 1961; Williamia radiata nutata (Hedley, 1908); Williamia radiata radiata (Pease, 1860)

Species of gastropod

Williamia radiata is a species of small sea snail or saltwater limpet with a lung, a marine pulmonate gastropod mollusc in the family Siphonariidae, the marine pulmonate limpets.
