= Acroreiidae =

Scientific classification
- Kingdom: Animalia
- Phylum: Mollusca
- Class: Gastropoda
- Order: Siphonariida
- Superfamily: Siphonarioidea
- Family: †Acroreiidae; Cossmann, 1893

Genera
- See text

Extinct family of gastropods

Acroreiidae is an extinct family of air-breathing snails, pulmonate gastropod mollusks in the superfamily Siphonariidae. The living siphonariids are all marine pulmonates, false sea limpets that breathe air.

== Taxonomy ==
The family Acroreiidae is classified in the informal group, Basommatophora (according to the taxonomy of the Gastropoda by Bouchet & Rocroi, 2005).

Acroreiidae has no subfamilies.

== Genera ==
The type genus is Acroreia Cossmann, 1885
