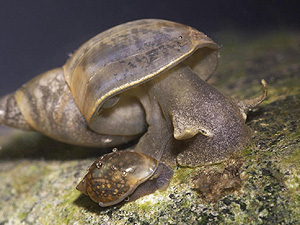
- The larger of the two snails shown here is Lymnaea stagnalis; the smaller one is Physella acuta, family Physidae

Scientific classification
- Kingdom: Animalia
- Phylum: Mollusca
- Class: Gastropoda
- Informal group: Pulmonata
- Informal group: Basommatophora; Keferstein in Bronn, 1864

Families
- See text

Diversity
- about 300 species

= Basommatophora =

Basommatophora Temporal range: Carboniferous–recent

Informal group of gastropods

Basommatophora was a term that was previously used as a taxonomic informal group, a group of snails within the informal group Pulmonata, the air-breathing slugs and snails. According to the taxonomy of the Gastropoda (Bouchet & Rocroi, 2005), whenever monophyly has not been tested, or where a traditional taxon of gastropods has now been discovered to be paraphyletic or polyphyletic, the term "group" or "informal group" was used.

Basommatophora are known from the Carboniferous to the Recent periods.

Most of the families in this suborder are air-breathing freshwater snails. The three most abundant families in terms of number of species are, the Lymnaeidae (pond snails), the Planorbidae (ramshorn snails) and the Physidae (pouch or bubble snails). These are found in ponds, creeks, ditches, and shallow lakes nearly worldwide.

The Siphonariidae on the other hand are unusual in that they have secondarily returned to the sea, and are now sea snails, limpet-like marine gastropods which live in the rocky intertidal zone but which still breathe air and become active at low tide. The single species in the family Amphibolidae is archaic and retains an operculum. It lives at such a high tidal level that it could perhaps be considered semi-terrestrial. Members of the family Chilinidae are confined to temperate parts of South America, and the Latiidae are limpet-like and confined to New Zealand.

Basommatophorans are characterized by having their eyes located at the base of their non-retractile tentacles, rather than at the tips, as in the true land snails Stylommatophora. The majority of basommatophorans have shells that are thin, translucent, and relatively colorless, and all except Amphibola lack an operculum.

== Taxonomy ==
=== 1997 taxonomy ===
In the older taxonomy of the Gastropoda (Ponder & Lindberg, 1997) the suborder Basommatophora consisted of the families :

- Acroloxidae Thiele, 1931
- Amphibolidae J. E. Gray, 1840 - only one species Amphibola crenata
- Ancylidae
- Carychiidae Jeffreys, 1830
- Chilinidae
- Lancidae
- Latiidae
- Lymnaeidae Rafinesque, 1815
- Otinidae H. Adams & A. Adams, 1855
- Physidae Fitzinger, 1833
- Planorbidae Rafinesque, 1815
- Siphonariidae J. E. Gray, 1840
- Trimusculidae Zilch, 1959

=== 2005 taxonomy ===
The informal group Basommatophora contains the following superfamilies and the clade Hygrophila (according to the Taxonomy of the Gastropoda (Bouchet & Rocroi, 2005)):

- Superfamily Amphiboloidea Gray, 1840
  - Family Amphibolidae Gray, 1840
- Superfamily Siphonarioidea Gray, 1827
  - Family Siphonariidae Gray, 1827
  - † Family Acroreiidae Cossmann, 1893

Clade Hygrophila

- Superfamily Chilinoidea Dall, 1870
  - Family Chilinidae Dall, 1870
  - Family Latiidae Hutton, 1882
- Superfamily Acroloxoidea Thiele, 1931
  - Family Acroloxidae Thiele, 1931
- Superfamily Lymnaeoidea Rafinesque, 1815
  - Family Lymnaeidae Rafinesque, 1815
- Superfamily Planorboidea Rafinesque, 1815
  - Family Planorbidae Rafinesque, 1815
  - Family Physidae Fitzinger, 1833

The family Ancylidae has been reduced in the new taxonomy to the status of tribe Ancylini Rafinesque, 1815 of the subfamily Planorbinae Rafinesque, 1815 of the family Planorbidae Rafinesque, 1815.

The family Carychiidae has been reduced in this taxonomy to the status of subfamily Carychiinae Jeffreys, 1830 of the family Ellobiidae L. Pfeiffer, 1854 (1822).

The family Lancidae has been reduced in this taxonomy to the status of subfamily Lancinae Hannibal, 1814 of the family Lymnaeidae Rafinesque, 1815.

=== 2010 taxonomy ===
More recently, the Basommatophora was found to be polyphyletic, and so Jörger et al. (2010) moved its three members, the (superfamily Siphonarioidea, superfamily Amphiboloidea, and clade Hygrophila) into a new taxon, Panpulmonata.
