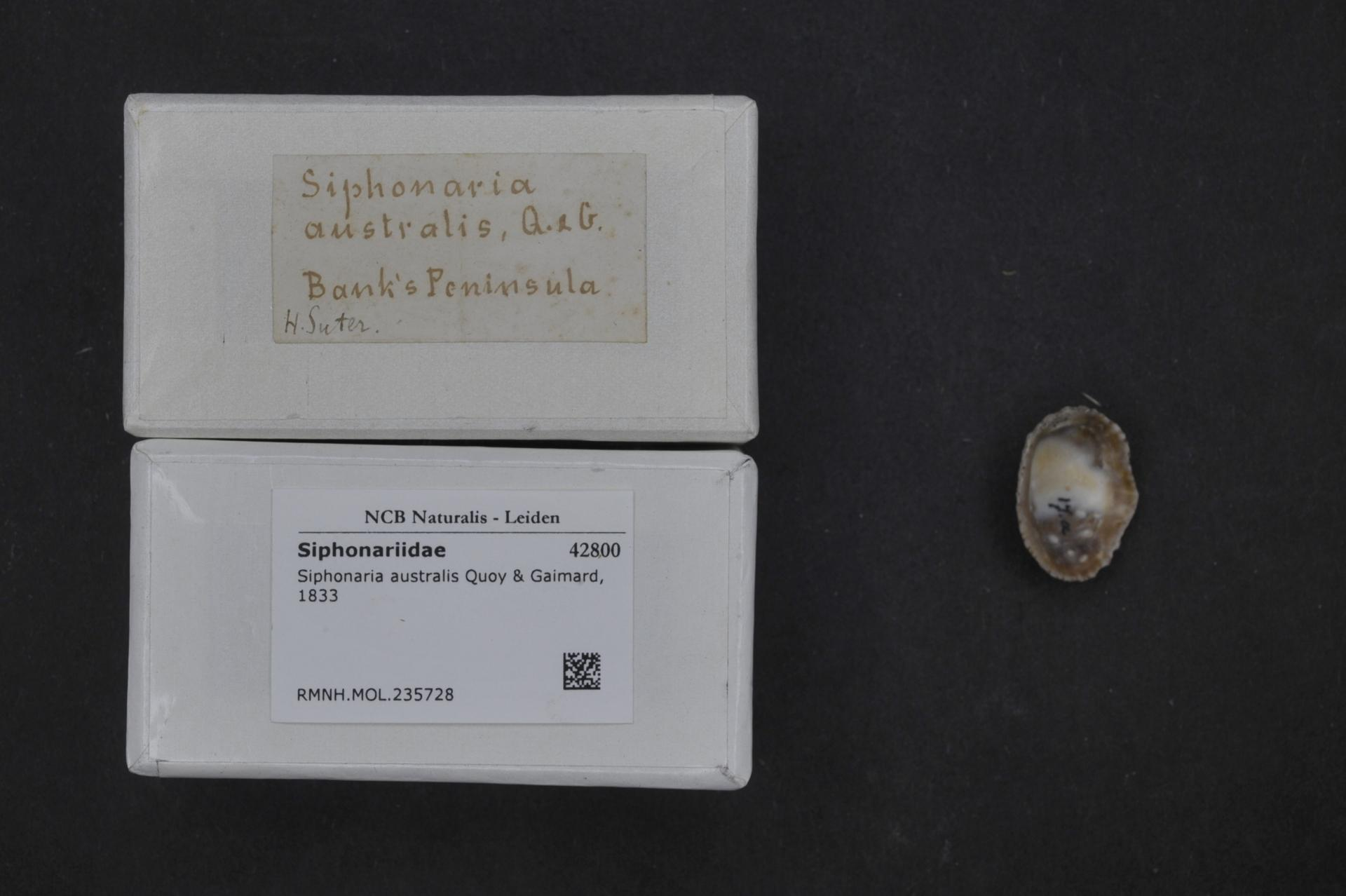

Scientific classification
- Kingdom: Animalia
- Phylum: Mollusca
- Class: Gastropoda
- Order: Siphonariida
- Family: Siphonariidae
- Genus: Siphonaria
- Species: S. australis

Binomial name
- Siphonaria australis Quoy & Gaimard, 1833

Synonyms
- Siphonaria cancer Reeve, 1856; Siphonaria cookiana Suter, 1909; Siphonaria inculta A. Gould, 1846

= Siphonaria australis =

Species of gastropod

Siphonaria australis is a species of air-breathing sea snail or false limpet, a marine pulmonate gastropod mollusc in the family Siphonariidae, the false limpets.

== Distribution ==
This marine species is endemic to New Zealand.
