= Williamia =

Scientific classification
- Kingdom: Animalia
- Phylum: Mollusca
- Class: Gastropoda
- Order: Siphonariida
- Family: Siphonariidae
- Genus: Williamia; Monterosato, 1884

Type species
- Ancyclus gussoni O.G. Costa, 1829

Species
- See text

Synonyms
- Allerya Mörch, 1877 (Invalid: suppressed by ICZN Opinion 1410); Brondelia Bourguignat, 1862 (Invalid: suppressed by ICZN Opinion 1410); Parascutum Cossmann, 1890; Roya Iredale, 1912; Scutulum Monterosato, 1877 (Invalid: junior homonym of Scutulum Tournouer, 1869 [Echinodermata]; Williamia and Parascutum are replacement names)

Genus of gastropods

Williamia is a genus of small sea snails or false limpets, marine pulmonate gastropod molluscs in the family Siphonariidae, the false (air-breathing) limpets.

Their development is similar to other Siphonariids.

== Species ==
Species within the genus Williamia include:

- Williamia eximia (Nevill in G. & H. Nevill, 1869)
- Williamia gussoni Costa, 1829
- Williamia krebsii (Mörch, 1877)
- Williamia magellanica Dall, 1927
- Williamia peltoides (Carpenter, 1864) - shield false limpet
- Williamia radiata (Pease, 1860)
- Williamia subspiralis (Carpenter, 1864)

Species brought into synonymy:

- Williamia galapagana Dall : synonym of Williamia peltoides (Carpenter, 1864)
- Williamia gussonii (O. G. Costa, 1829): synonym of Williamia gussoni (Costa O. G., 1829)
- Williamia japonica Habe, 1962: synonym of Williamia radiata (Pease, 1860)
- Williamia kermadecensis (Iredale, 1912): synonym of Williamia radiata (Pease, 1860)
- Williamia nutata (Headley, 1908): synonym of Williamia radiata (Headley, 1908)
- Williamia oblongata (Yokoyama, 1926): synonym of Siphonacmea oblongata (Yokoyama, 1926)
- Williamia polynesica Rehder, 1980: synonym of Williamia radiata (Pease, 1860)
- Williamia radiata Kuroda & Habe, in Habe, 1961: synonym of Williamia radiata (Pease, 1860)
- Williamia tomlini (Robson, 1913): synonym of Aporemodon tomlini Robson, 1913
