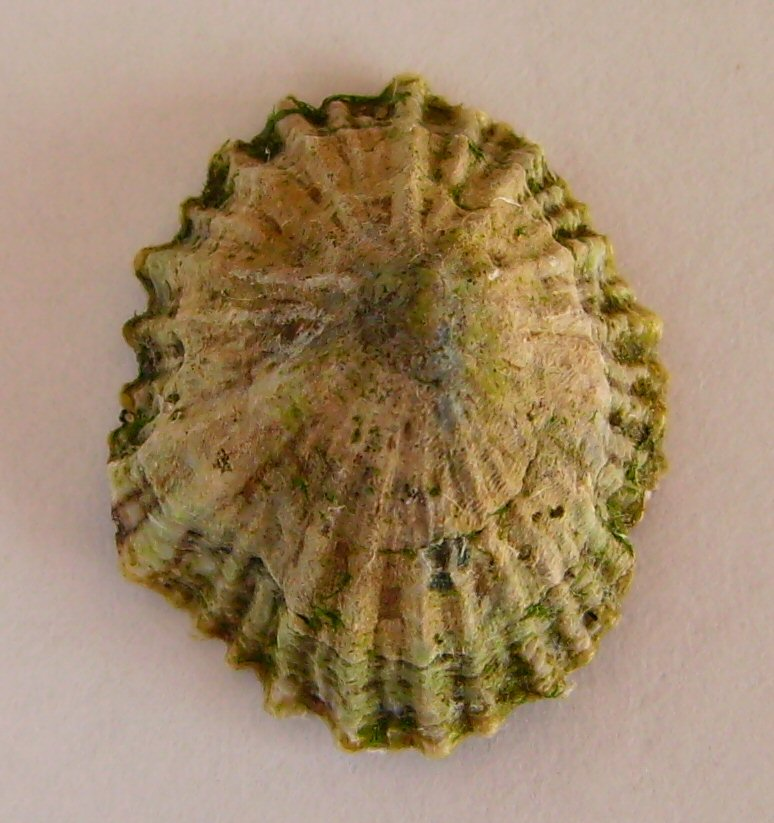
- A shell of Siphonaria zelandica

Scientific classification
- Kingdom: Animalia
- Phylum: Mollusca
- Class: Gastropoda
- Order: Siphonariida
- Superfamily: Siphonarioidea; J. E. Gray, 1827

Family
- Family Siphonariidae † Family Acroreiidae

= Siphonarioidea =

Superfamily of gastropods

Siphonarioidea is a taxonomic superfamily of air-breathing sea snails or false limpets, marine gastropod mollusks in the clade Panpulmonata.

== Distribution ==
The Siphonarioidea are broadly distributed across the globe, however they are known to be the most abundant and species diverse in the warmer temperate to subtropical regions. More specifically, they are found within the southern hemisphere of the Indo-Pacific region. They generally inhabit marine benthic regions, specifically the subtidal zones.

== Description ==
Siphonarioidea are almost entirely marine organisms, as they have been found to have evolved into despite the terrestrial ecosystems inhabited by their ancestors. They inhabit the subtidal zones of marine ecosystems, and resemble true limpets with their non coiled, conical shells. Siphonarioidea are frequently referred to as "false limpets" due to some distinct differences despite their resemblance to these Patellogastropoda. For example, Siphonariid adults' dorso-ventral muscles have a C-shape pattern and surround the central mantle cavity, which contrasts to the U-shaped muscles of patellogastropods. Siphonarioidea have a singular lung on the right side of their bodies that has two openings for inhaling and exhaling water, which cause their asymmetrical shell shape. When they are submerged in water, the Siphonarioidea breathe by inhaling water through the current created by the cilia on their gills and in their lung cavity. They absorb the oxygen from the water, then release the water back into the current, along with exhalalant carbon dioxide. The Siphonarioidea are highly adapted to being able to breathe by accessing oxygen from both the atmosphere and from water. When they are exposed to air, their lung opening remains open, and no longer requires active ventilation. Siphonarioidea move by gliding around with the mucus that they produce, but they are facultatively mobile, and therefore do not move around very often.

=== Adaptations ===
The Siphonarioidea tend to outcompete the true limpets in lower latitudes, which can be attributed to various physiological adaptations. The first is as before mentioned, where they are highly efficient in their respiration in both air and water. In addition, if the Siphonarioidea are exposed to air for extended periods of time, they will undergo a facultative depression of their metabolic rate, lowering their average heart rate from 50 bpm to around 20, and closing their lung opening. The Siphonarioidea can continue in this state of metabolic depression for up to 72 hours, or until they are once again submerged in water. Another notable adaptation of the Siphonarioidea is their production of a white, sticky, and acidic mucus, secreted by many subepidermal glands on the mantle. This mucus can be toxic to fish, and is generally unpalatable to predators. The Siphonarioidea also have a certain behavioral adaptation that goes to explain why they live in the more calm areas of the rocky intertidal. When the high tide or low tide comes around, the Siphonarioidea prepare for periods of inactivity, so as to prevent desiccation or uprooting by heavy wave-break. During these periods, they attach to their "home scar," or a small pit in a rock that their shells closely adhere to, to reduce the threat of these dangers.

== Reproduction ==
A key difference between the Siphonarioidea and the Patellogastropoda is the fact that Siphonarioidea are simultaneous hermaphrodites that practice internal fertilization. During copulation, a Siphonaria will insert their penis into the other's genital opening; this can be mutual or one-sided. The sperm is then deposited in the female gentials, which produces egg masses. The masses are known to have a high surface area to volume ratio. This provides protection against desiccation and other environmental factors, although development is still affected, sometimes to a fatal extent. In each egg, the juveniles develop and then eventually hatch. Some adaptations to these threats are spawning in intertidal pools, or coiling to trap water. Once hatched, they must at one point settle and undergo metamorphosis before they can become an adult.

=== Life Stages ===
The blastula and gastrula phase in Siphonarioidea occurs for only a 1-2 day period, after which a yolk-like trochophore forms within 2–3 days. By the 3-4 day, the larva will grow its foot and its shell. Upon larval development, the emerged larvae can be either free-swimming or planktonic. The free-swimming larvae will emerge around 7 days upon the laying of the eggs, but the planktonic larvae will usually emerge around 3–4 weeks after.

== Diet ==
Siphonarioidea have characteristically weak radula, which limits them to only being able to consume softer, delicate algae, usually only grazing on the top layers instead of fully uprooting it. This selective physical trait causes them to usually be inferior in terms of competition with true limpets, although they are never completely outcompeted.

== Taxonomy ==
=== 2005 Taxonomy ===
Siphonarioidea was previously a superfamily in the informal group Basommatophora within the Pulmonata.

=== 2010 Taxonomy ===
Jörger et al. (2010) determined that the Basommatophora (Siphonarioidea, Amphiboloidea, and Hygrophila) was a polyphyletic group, and they moved the Siphonarioidea to the Panpulmonata.
