= Siphonaria lateralis =

Scientific classification
- Kingdom: Animalia
- Phylum: Mollusca
- Class: Gastropoda
- Order: Siphonariida
- Family: Siphonariidae
- Genus: Siphonaria
- Species: S. lateralis

Binomial name
- Siphonaria lateralis (Gould, 1846)

Synonyms
- Siphonaria lateralis Suter, 1913; Kerguelenia innominata Iredale, 1915; Siphonaria stewartiana Hubendick, 1946; Kerguelenella flemingi Powell, 1955

Species of gastropod

Siphonaria laterals is a species of air-breathing sea snail, a false limpet, a marine pulmonate gastropod mollusc in the family Siphonariidae, the false limpets.
