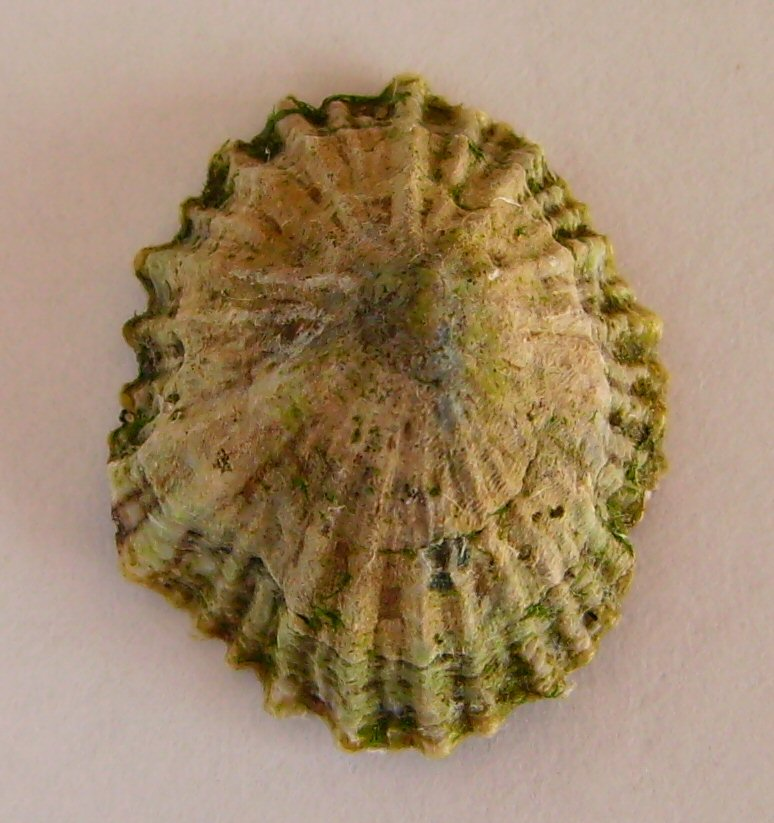
- Dorsal view of a shell of Siphonaria zelandica

Scientific classification
- Kingdom: Animalia
- Phylum: Mollusca
- Class: Gastropoda
- Order: Siphonariida
- Family: Siphonariidae
- Genus: Siphonaria
- Species: S. zelandica

Binomial name
- Siphonaria zelandica Quoy & Gaimard, 1833

Synonyms
- Planesiphon elegans Iredale, 1940; Siphonaria baconi Reeve, 1856; Siphonaria zebra Reeve, 1856

= Siphonaria zelandica =

Species of gastropod

Siphonaria zelandica is a species of medium-sized air-breathing sea snail or false limpet, a marine pulmonate gastropod mollusc in the family Siphonariidae, the false limpets.

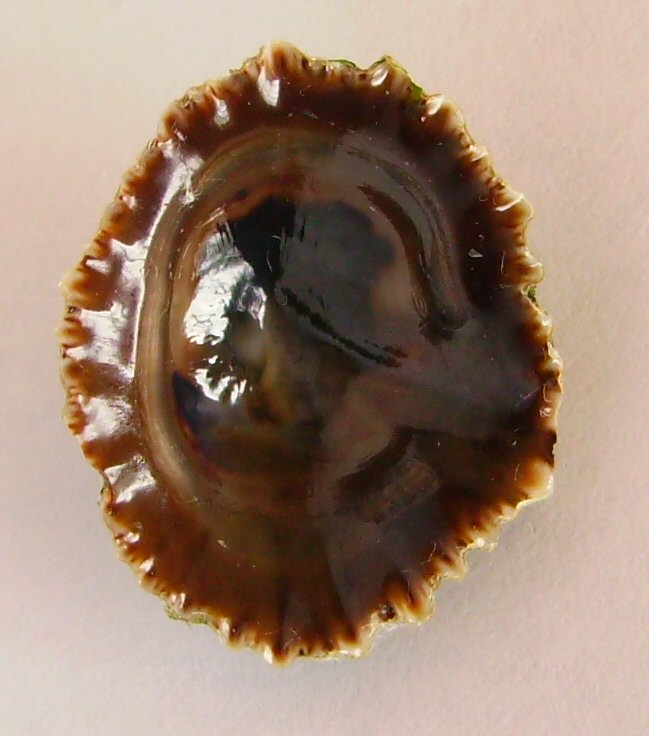
Ventral view of a shell of Siphonaria zelandica showing the siphonal groove on the right

== Description ==
The length of the shell attains 19.9 mm.

== Distribution ==
This marine species occurs off New Zealand and Lord Howe Island.
