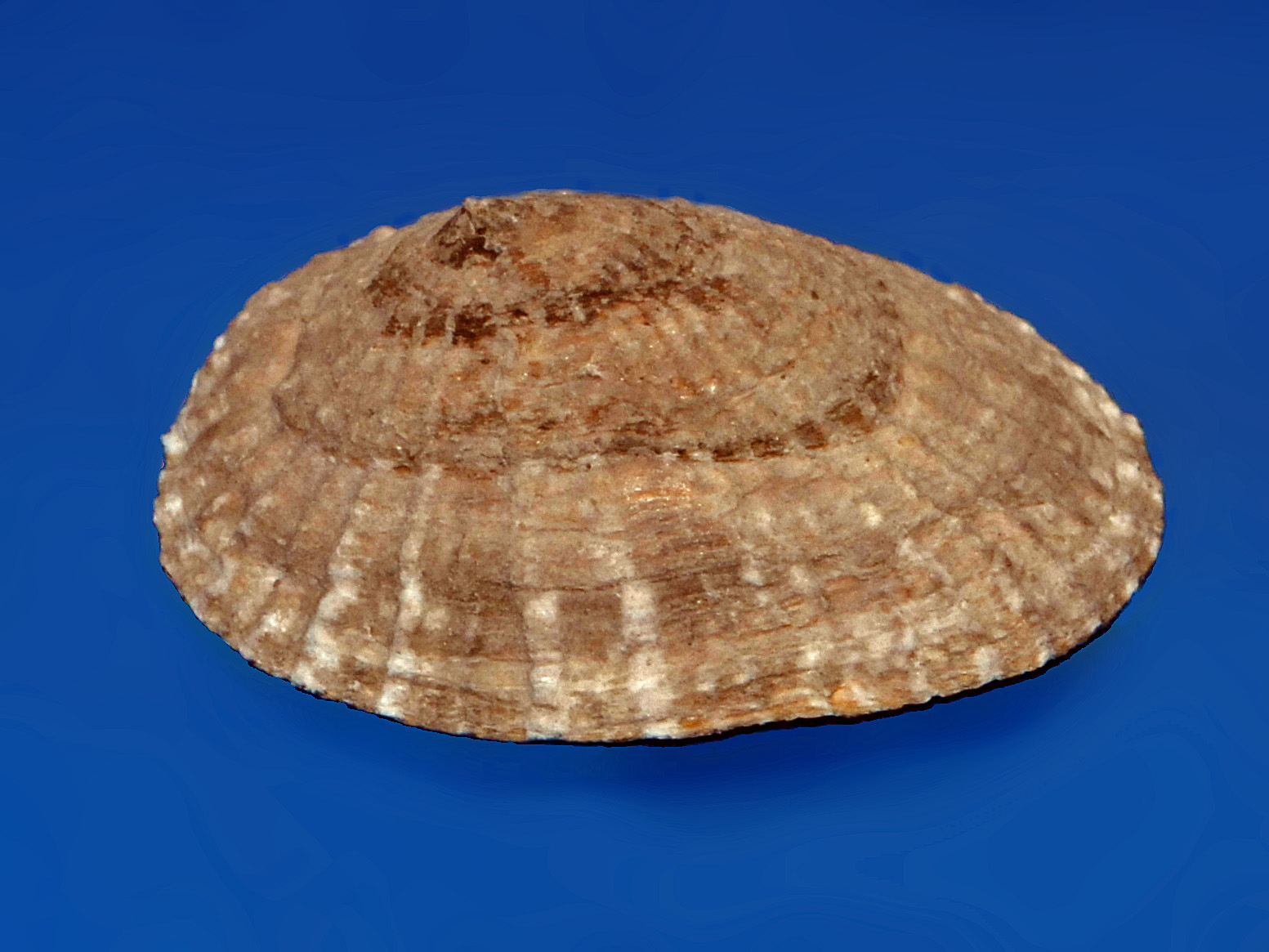
- Shell of Benhamina obliquata from New Zealand at the Museo Civico di Storia Naturale di Milano

Scientific classification
- Kingdom: Animalia
- Phylum: Mollusca
- Class: Gastropoda
- (unranked): clade Heterobranchia clade Euthyneura clade Panpulmonata
- Family: Siphonariidae
- Genus: Benhamina Finlay, 1926
- Species: B. obliquata

Binomial name
- Benhamina obliquata (G. B. Sowerby I, 1825)

Synonyms
- Siphonaria (Benhamina) obliquata G. B. Sowerby I, 1825; Siphonaria obliquata Sowerby I, 1825; Siphonaria scutellum Deshayes, 1839

= Benhamina obliquata =

Species of gastropod

Benhamina obliquata is a species of air-breathing sea snail, a false limpet, a marine pulmonate gastropod mollusc in the family Siphonariidae.

This species is very large compared with the other species in the family.

This is the only species in this genus; in other words, Benhamina is a monotypic genus. It is endemic to New Zealand.

Generic name Benhamina is in tribute to British oligo- and polychaetologist William Blaxland Benham.
