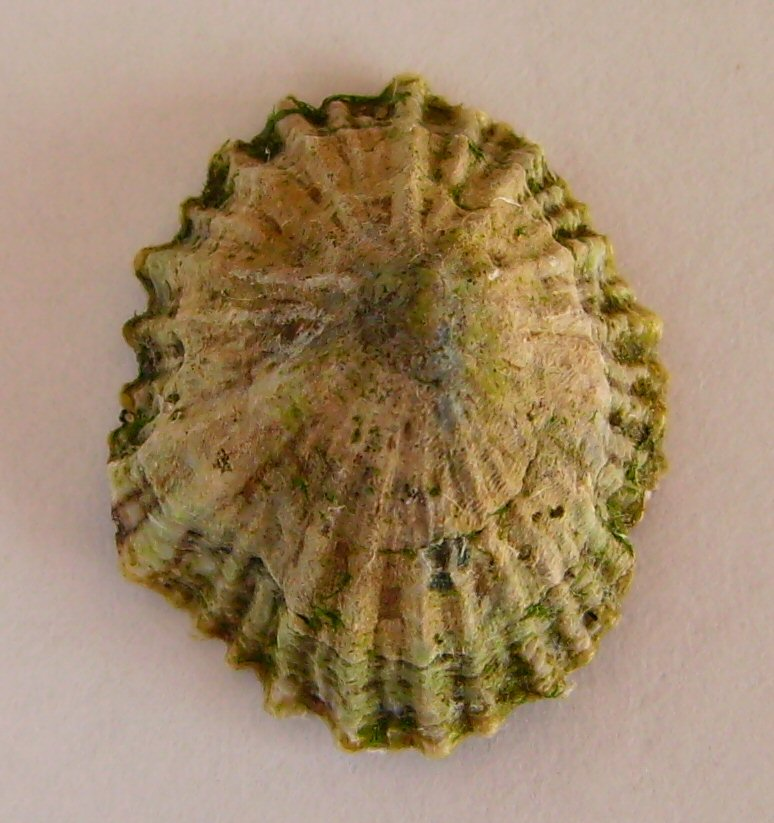
- Dorsal view of a shell of Siphonaria zelandica

Scientific classification
- Kingdom: Animalia
- Phylum: Mollusca
- Class: Gastropoda
- Order: Siphonariida
- Superfamily: Siphonarioidea
- Family: Siphonariidae; J. E. Gray, 1840

Synonyms
- Liriolidae; Siphonacmeidae

= Siphonariidae =

Family of molluscs

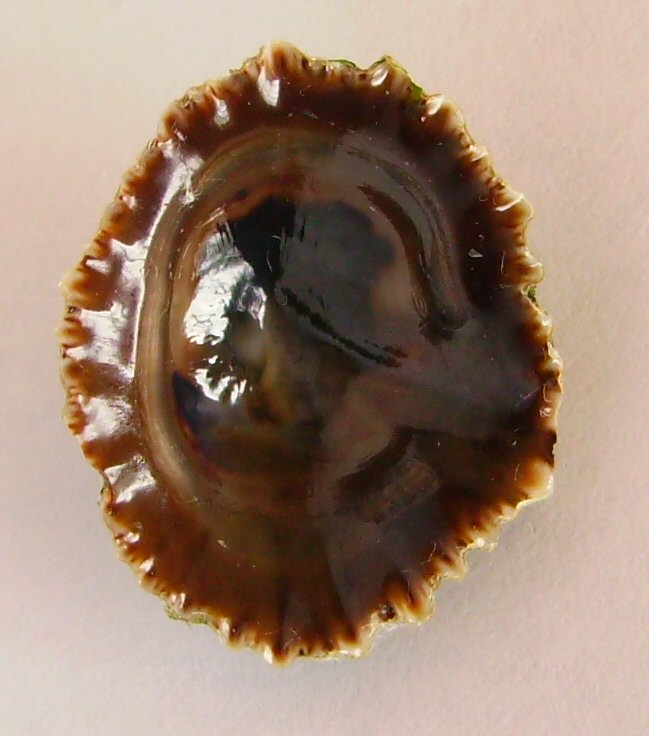
Ventral view of a shell of Siphonaria zelandica showing the siphonal groove on the right

Siphonariidae, also known as false limpets, are a taxonomic family of small to medium-sized air-breathing sea snails, marine and brackish water pulmonate gastropod molluscs.

== Shell description ==
Empty siphonariid limpet shells can be distinguished from true limpet shells by examining the interior. In the siphonariids there is a well-marked lateral groove on the right side of the shell, and a corresponding interruption of the ring of muscle attachment scars. These markers show the positioning of the pneumostome or pulmonary orifice.

== Genera ==
Genera in the family Siphonariidae include:

- Anthosiphonaria Kuroda & Habe, 1971 -
  - Anthosiphonaria sirius -
- Aporemodon Robson, 1913
- Benhamina Finlay, 1927 - with the only one species Benhamina obliquata (G. B. Sowerby I, 1825)
- Ellsiphon Iredale, 1940
- Hebesiphon Iredale, 1940
- Heterosiphonaria Hubendick, 1945
- Hubendickula McAlpine, 1952
- Kerguelenella Powell, 1946 - synonym: Kerguelenia Mabille & Rochebrune, 1889
- Legosiphon Iredale, 1940
- Mallorisiphon Iredale, 1940
- Mestosiphon Iredale, 1940
- Pachysiphonaria Hubendick, 1945
- Parellsiphon Iredale, 1940
- Patellopsis Nobre, 1886
- Pugillaria Iredale, 1924
- Siphonacmaea Habe, 1958
- Siphonaria G. B. Sowerby I, 1823 - type genus of the family Siphonariidae
- Talisiphon Iredale, 1940
- Williamia Monterosato, 1884 - synonyms: Allerya Mörch, 1877; Brondelia Bourguignat, 1862; Parascutum Cossmann, 1890; Roya Iredale, 1912; Scutulum Monterosato, 1877.

Genera brought into synonymy

- Allerya Mörch, 1877: synonym of Williamia Monterosato, 1884
- Brondelia Bourguignat, 1862: synonym of Williamia Monterosato, 1884
- Ductosiphonaria Hubendick, 1945: synonym of Siphonaria Sowerby I, 1823
- Kerguelenia Mabille & Rochebrune, 1889: synonym of Kerguelenella Powell, 1946
- Liriola Dall, 1870: synonym of Siphonaria Sowerby I, 1823
- Mouretus Blainville, 1824: synonym of Siphonaria Sowerby I, 1823
- Parascutum Cossmann, 1890: synonym of Williamia Monterosato, 1884
- Planesiphon Zilch, 1959: synonym of Siphonaria G. B. Sowerby I, 1823
- Roya Iredale, 1912: synonym of Williamia Monterosato, 1884
- Scutulum Monterosato, 1877: synonym of Williamia Monterosato, 1884
- Siphonacmaea [sic] : synonym of Siphonacmea Habe, 1958
