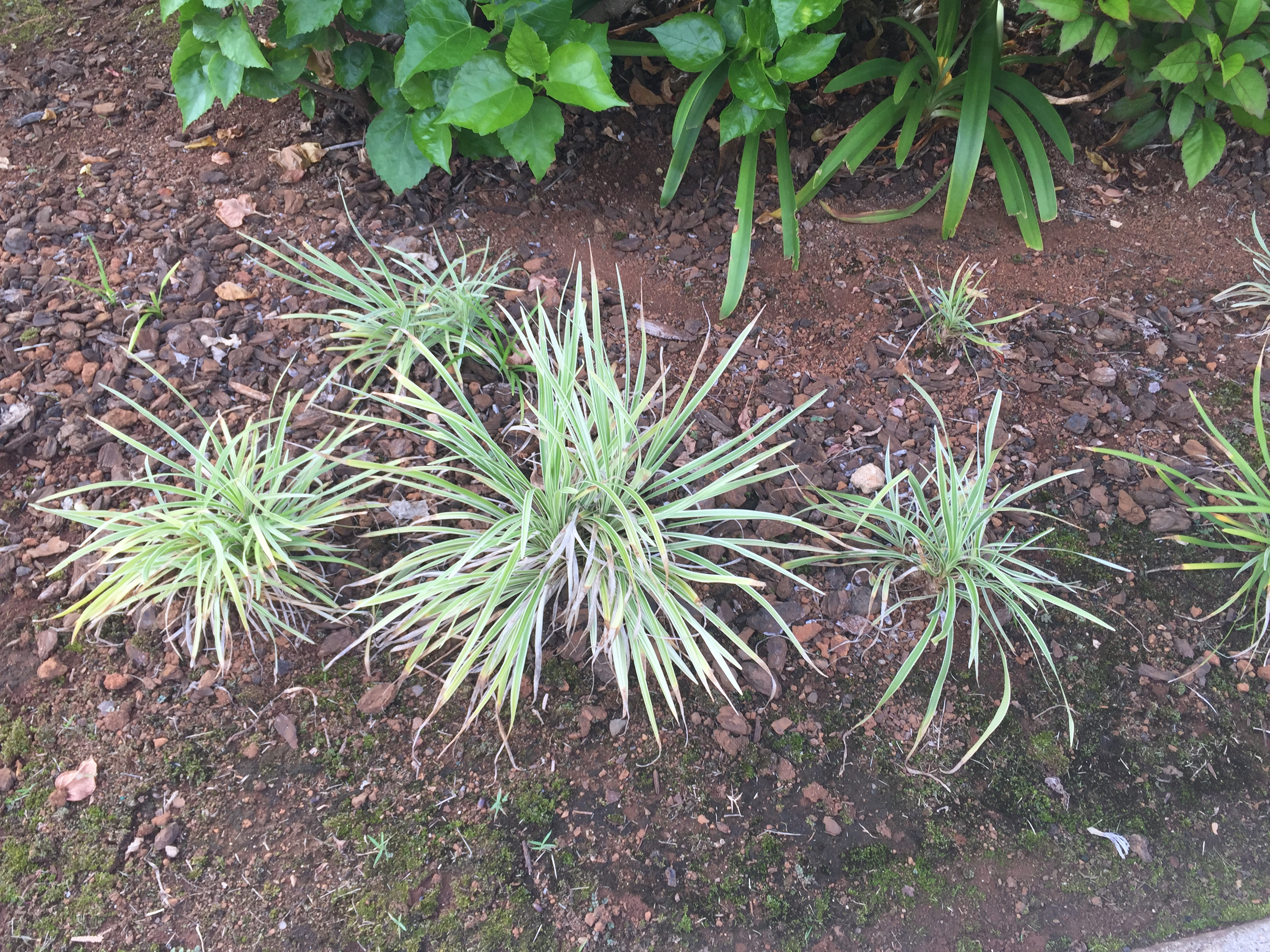

Scientific classification
- Kingdom: Plantae
- Clade: Tracheophytes
- Clade: Angiosperms
- Clade: Monocots
- Clade: Commelinids
- Order: Poales
- Family: Bromeliaceae
- Genus: Hechtia
- Species: H. glomerata

Binomial name
- Hechtia glomerata Zucc.

Synonyms
- Dasylirion pitcairniifolium Karw. ex Zucc.; Hechtia ghiesbreghtii Lem.; Hechtia gamopetala Mez; Hechtia morreniana Mez

= Hechtia glomerata =

Guapilla

Species of flowering plant

Hechtia glomerata, commonly known as guapilla, is a species of bromeliad that is native to southern Texas in the United States, Mexico, and Guatemala.

== Cultivars ==
- Hechtia 'Ventura' (H. marnier-lapostollei × H. glomerata)
