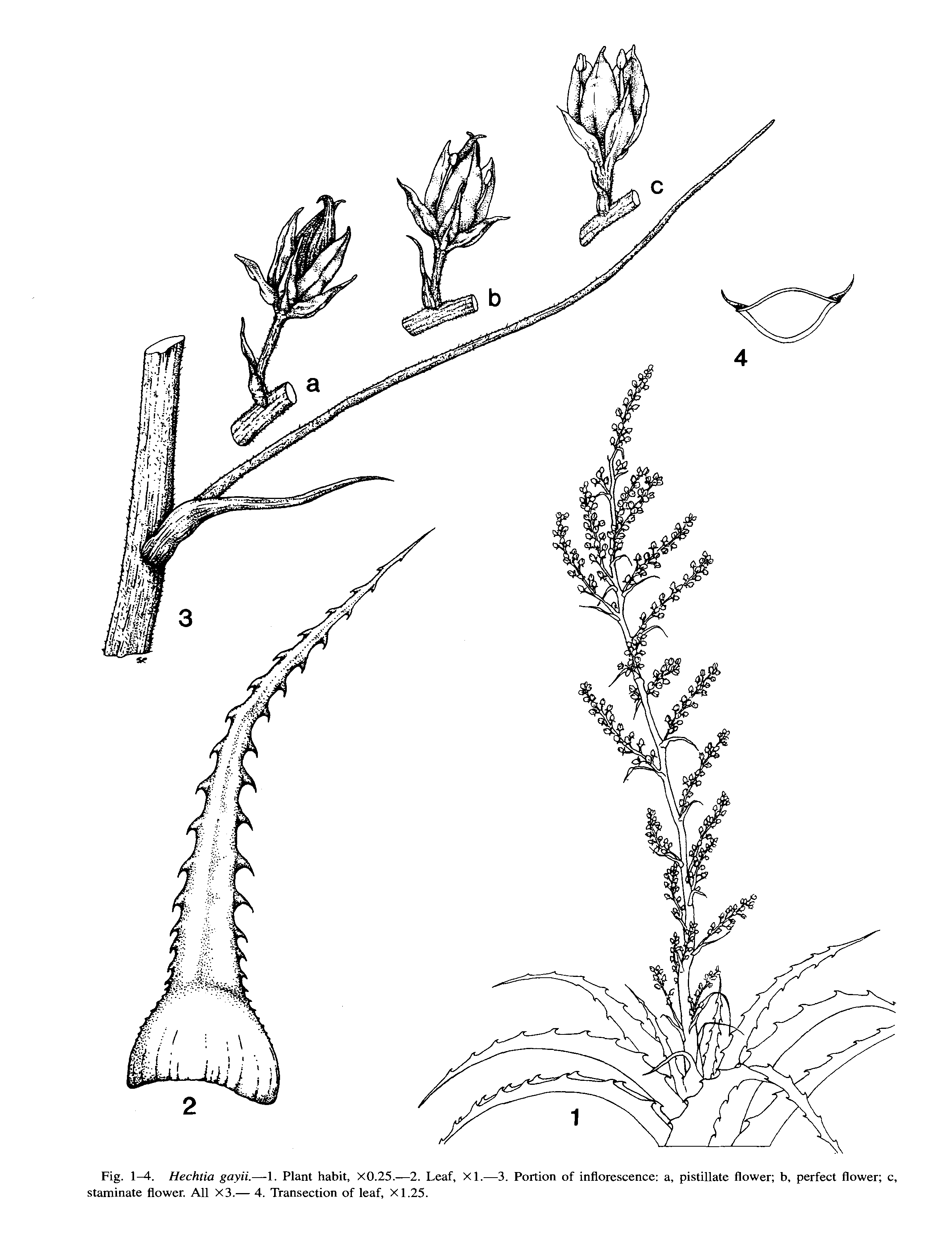
- The illustration from the protologue

Scientific classification
- Kingdom: Plantae
- Clade: Tracheophytes
- Clade: Angiosperms
- Clade: Monocots
- Clade: Commelinids
- Order: Poales
- Family: Bromeliaceae
- Genus: Hechtia
- Species: H. gayorum

Binomial name
- Hechtia gayorum Lee Wayne Lenz

Synonyms
- Hechtia gayii L.W.Lenz (orth. var.)

= Hechtia gayorum =

Species of flowering plant

Hechtia gayorum is a species of plant in the genus Hechtia and is the only monoecious species within the genus. It is known commonly as the Gay hechtia. This species is endemic to a small region west of San José del Cabo in Baja California Sur, Mexico.

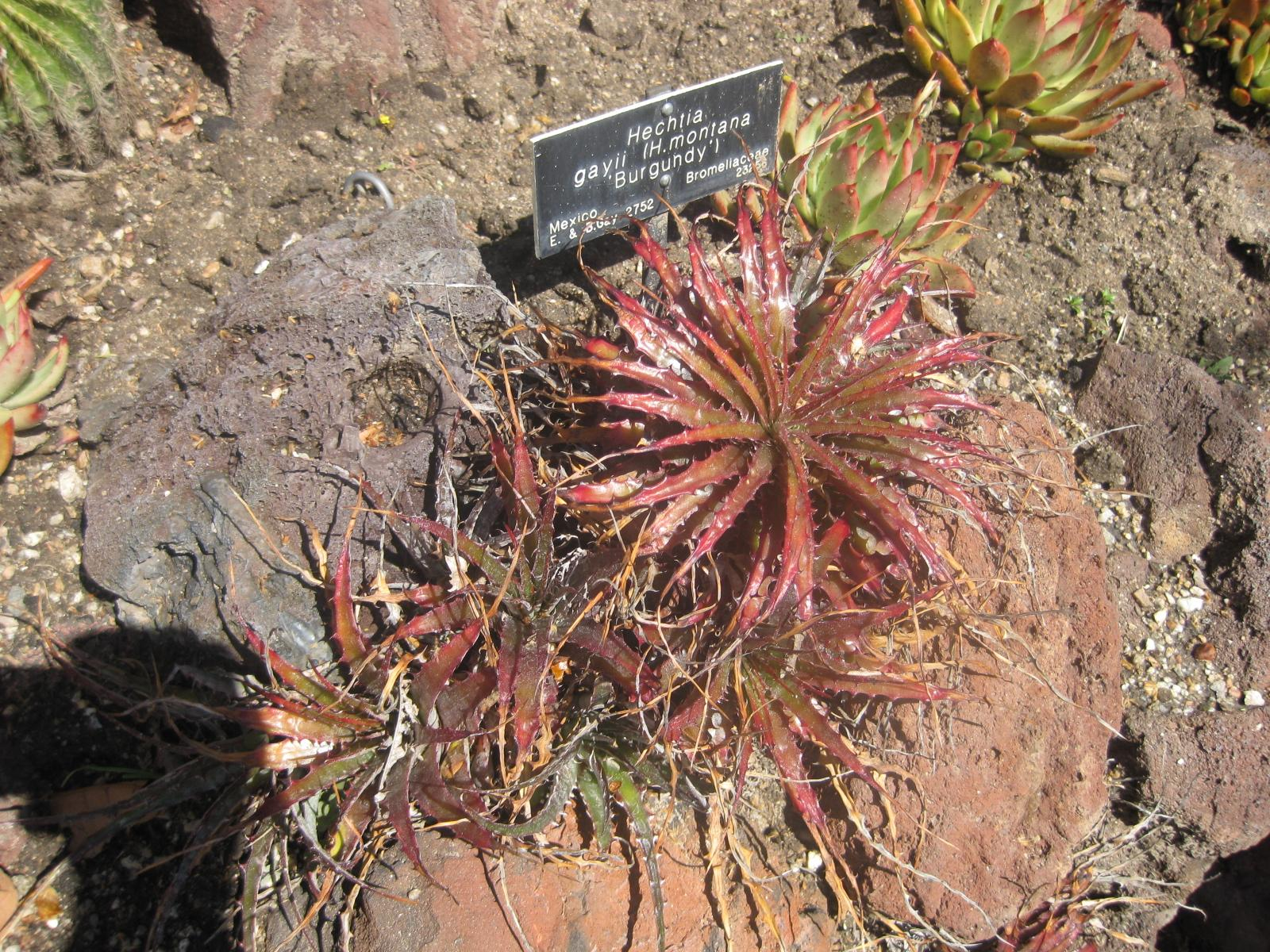
Hechtia gayorum at the Huntington Library

Ed and Betty Gay of Tarzana, Los Angeles, California initially discovered the species in 1968 in a canyon west of San José del Cabo. The couple collected propagules and gave them to the Huntington Library, who subsequently introduced the plants into cultivation under Hechtia montana as the cultivar 'Burgundy', in reference to the red coloring of the leaves on the cultivated plants.

No 'Burgundy' plants had ever bloomed in cultivation, until a specimen grown at the California Botanic Garden (formerly the Rancho Santa Ana Botanic Garden, or RSABG) finally bloomed in March of 1994. The inflorescence was evidently not that of Hechtia montana, the only known Hechtia on the Baja California Peninsula, and so the undescribed species was named in 1995 as Hechtia gayii by Lee W. Lenz, after Ed and Betty Gay.
