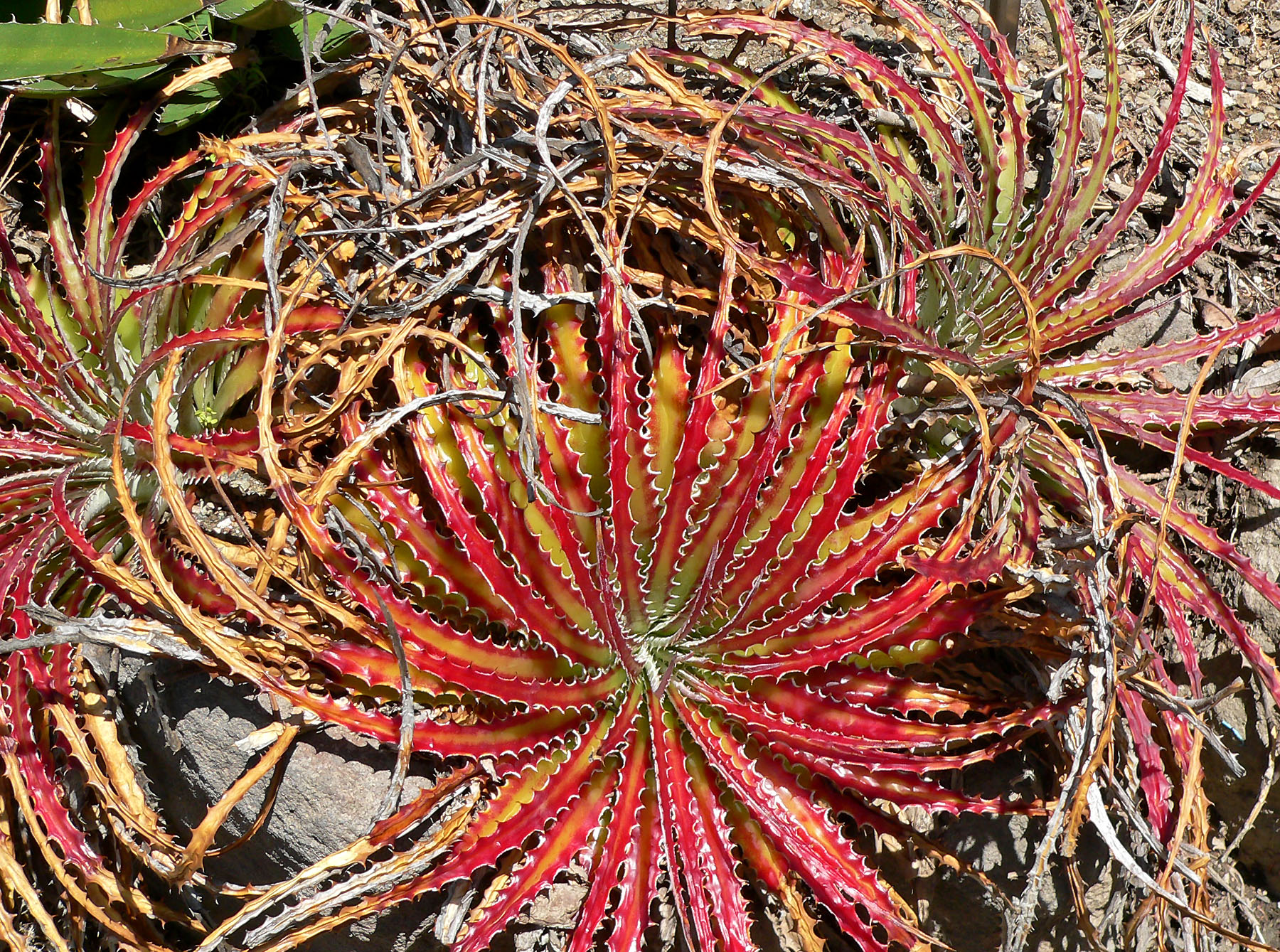

Scientific classification
- Kingdom: Plantae
- Clade: Tracheophytes
- Clade: Angiosperms
- Clade: Monocots
- Clade: Commelinids
- Order: Poales
- Family: Bromeliaceae
- Genus: Hechtia
- Species: H. texensis

Binomial name
- Hechtia texensis S.Watson

Synonyms
- Hechtia scariosa L.B.Sm.

= Hechtia texensis =

Species of flowering plant

Hechtia texensis, commonly known as Texas false agave, is a species of bromeliad that is native to the Trans-Pecos of Texas in the United States and northeastern Mexico (Chihuahua, Coahuila, Zacatecas).
