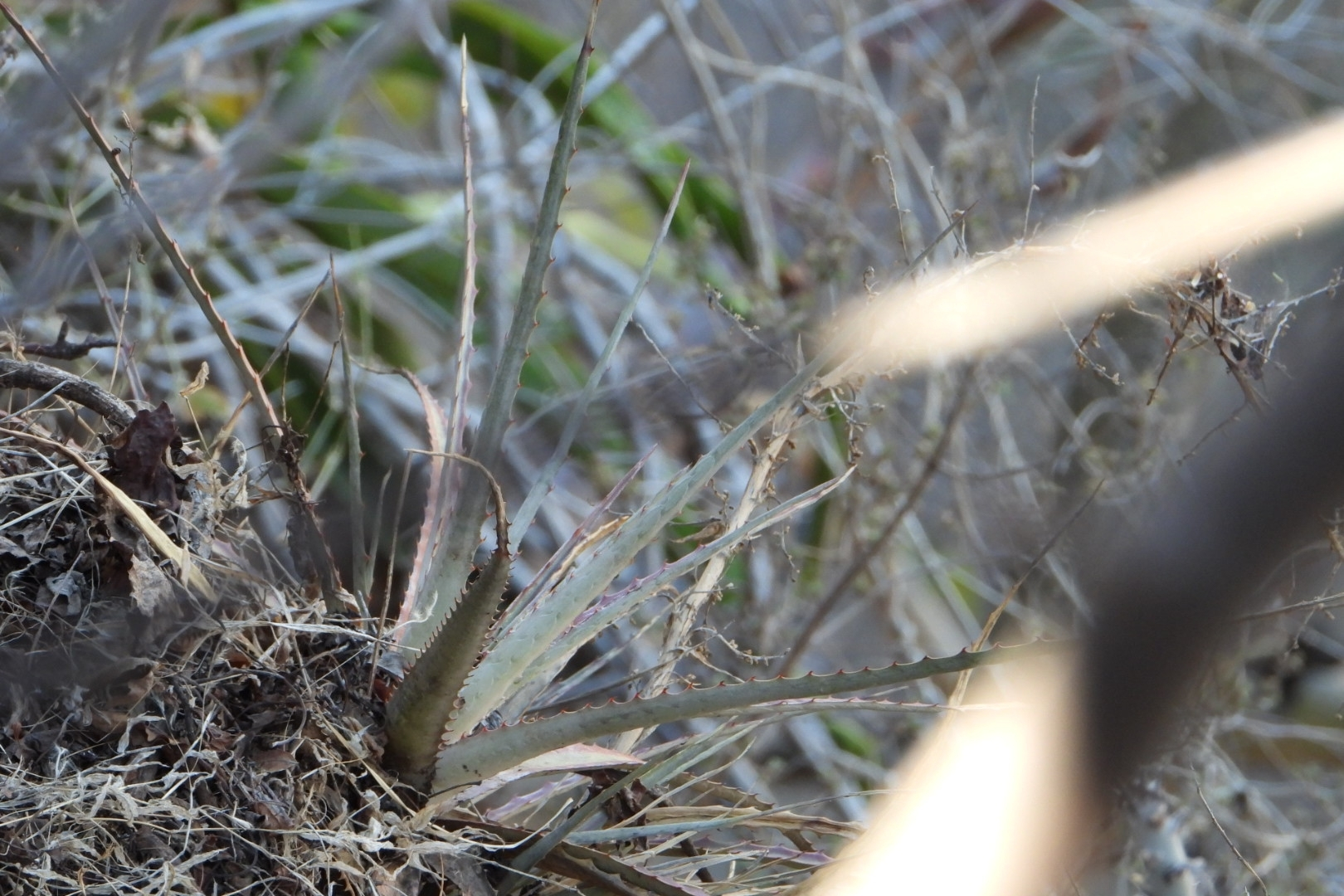

Scientific classification
- Kingdom: Plantae
- Clade: Tracheophytes
- Clade: Angiosperms
- Clade: Monocots
- Clade: Commelinids
- Order: Poales
- Family: Bromeliaceae
- Genus: Hechtia
- Species: H. pedicellata

Binomial name
- Hechtia pedicellata S.Watson

= Hechtia pedicellata =

Species of flowering plant

Hechtia pedicellata is a species of plant in the bromeliad family. This species is endemic to Mexico.
