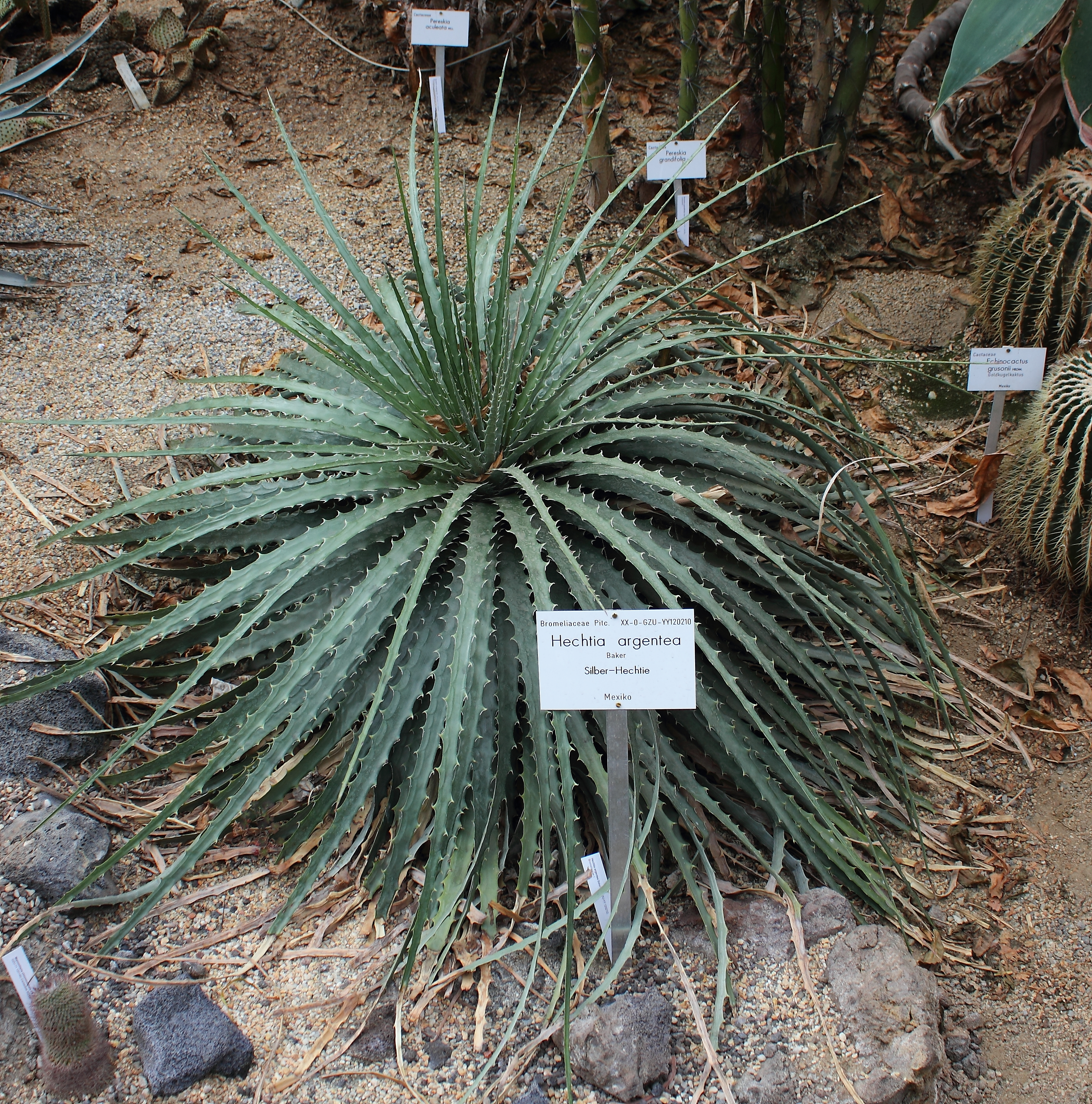

Scientific classification
- Kingdom: Plantae
- Clade: Tracheophytes
- Clade: Angiosperms
- Clade: Monocots
- Clade: Commelinids
- Order: Poales
- Family: Bromeliaceae
- Genus: Hechtia
- Species: H. argentea

Binomial name
- Hechtia argentea Baker

= Hechtia argentea =

Species of plant

Hechtia argentea is a species of flowering plant in the Bromeliaceae family. It is endemic to Mexico.

== Cultivars ==
- Hechtia 'Dorothy'
