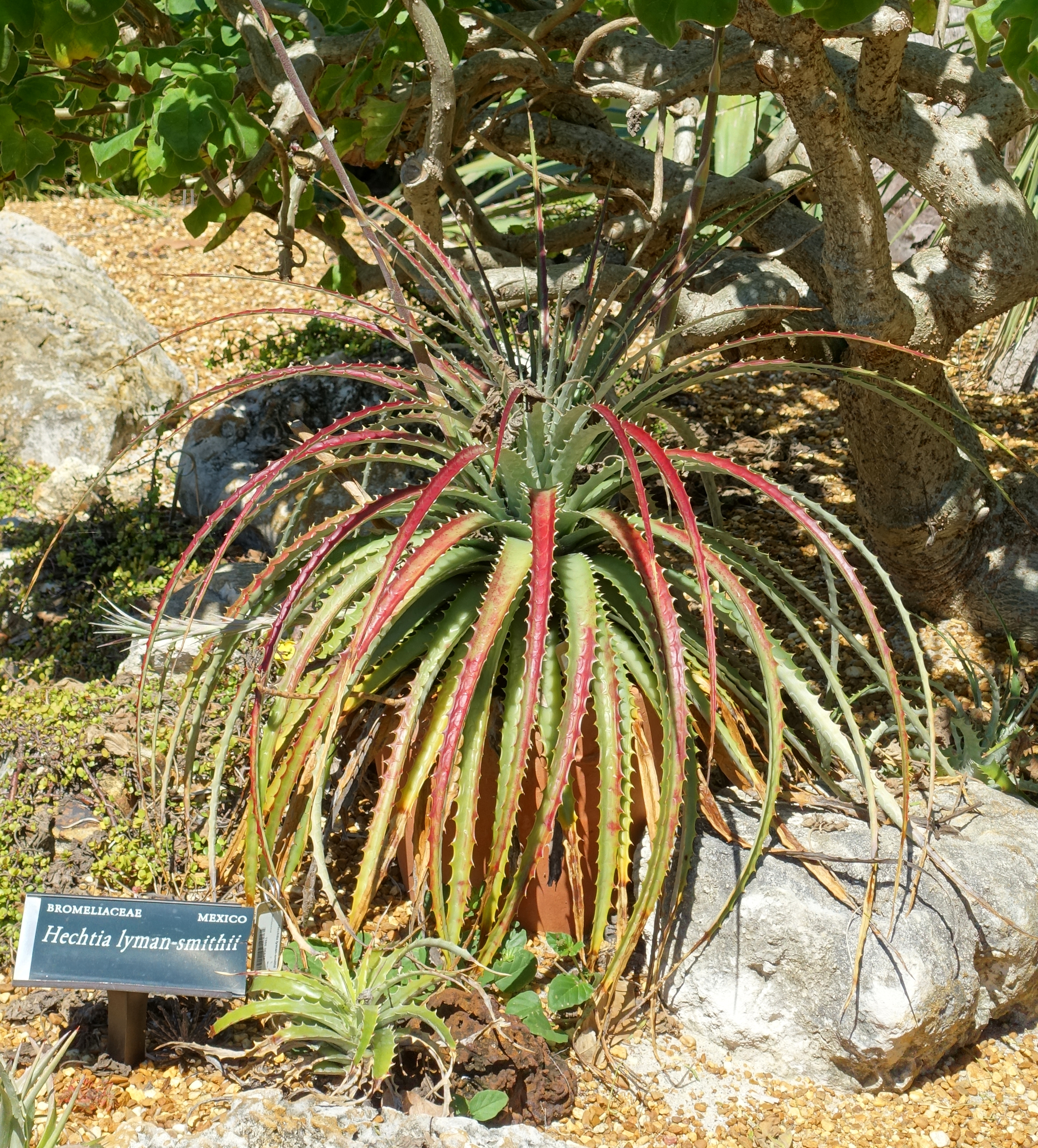

Scientific classification
- Kingdom: Plantae
- Clade: Tracheophytes
- Clade: Angiosperms
- Clade: Monocots
- Clade: Commelinids
- Order: Poales
- Family: Bromeliaceae
- Genus: Hechtia
- Species: H. lyman-smithii

Binomial name
- Hechtia lyman-smithii Burt-Utley & J.Utley

= Hechtia lyman-smithii =

Species of flowering plant

Hechtia lyman-smithii is a species of plant in the genus Hechtia. This species is native to and mainly found in southwest Mexico.
