= Hechtia schottii =

Scientific classification
- Kingdom: Plantae
- Clade: Tracheophytes
- Clade: Angiosperms
- Clade: Monocots
- Clade: Commelinids
- Order: Poales
- Family: Bromeliaceae
- Genus: Hechtia
- Species: H. schottii

Binomial name
- Hechtia schottii Baker

Species of plant

Hechtia schottii is a species of flowering plant in the Bromeliaceae family. This species is native to Mexico.
