= Hechtia roseana =

Scientific classification
- Kingdom: Plantae
- Clade: Tracheophytes
- Clade: Angiosperms
- Clade: Monocots
- Clade: Commelinids
- Order: Poales
- Family: Bromeliaceae
- Genus: Hechtia
- Species: H. roseana

Binomial name
- Hechtia roseana L.B.Sm.

Species of flowering plant

Hechtia roseana is a species of plant in the genus Hechtia. This species is endemic to Mexico.
