= Hechtia suaveolens =

Scientific classification
- Kingdom: Plantae
- Clade: Embryophytes
- Clade: Tracheophytes
- Clade: Spermatophytes
- Clade: Angiosperms
- Clade: Monocots
- Clade: Commelinids
- Order: Poales
- Family: Bromeliaceae
- Genus: Hechtia
- Species: H. suaveolens

Binomial name
- Hechtia suaveolens É.Morren ex Mez

Species of flowering plant

Hechtia suaveolens is a species of flowering plant in the family Bromeliaceae.

This species was described in 1896 from a herbarium specimen of unknown origin, probably Mexico. It is most likely extinct.
