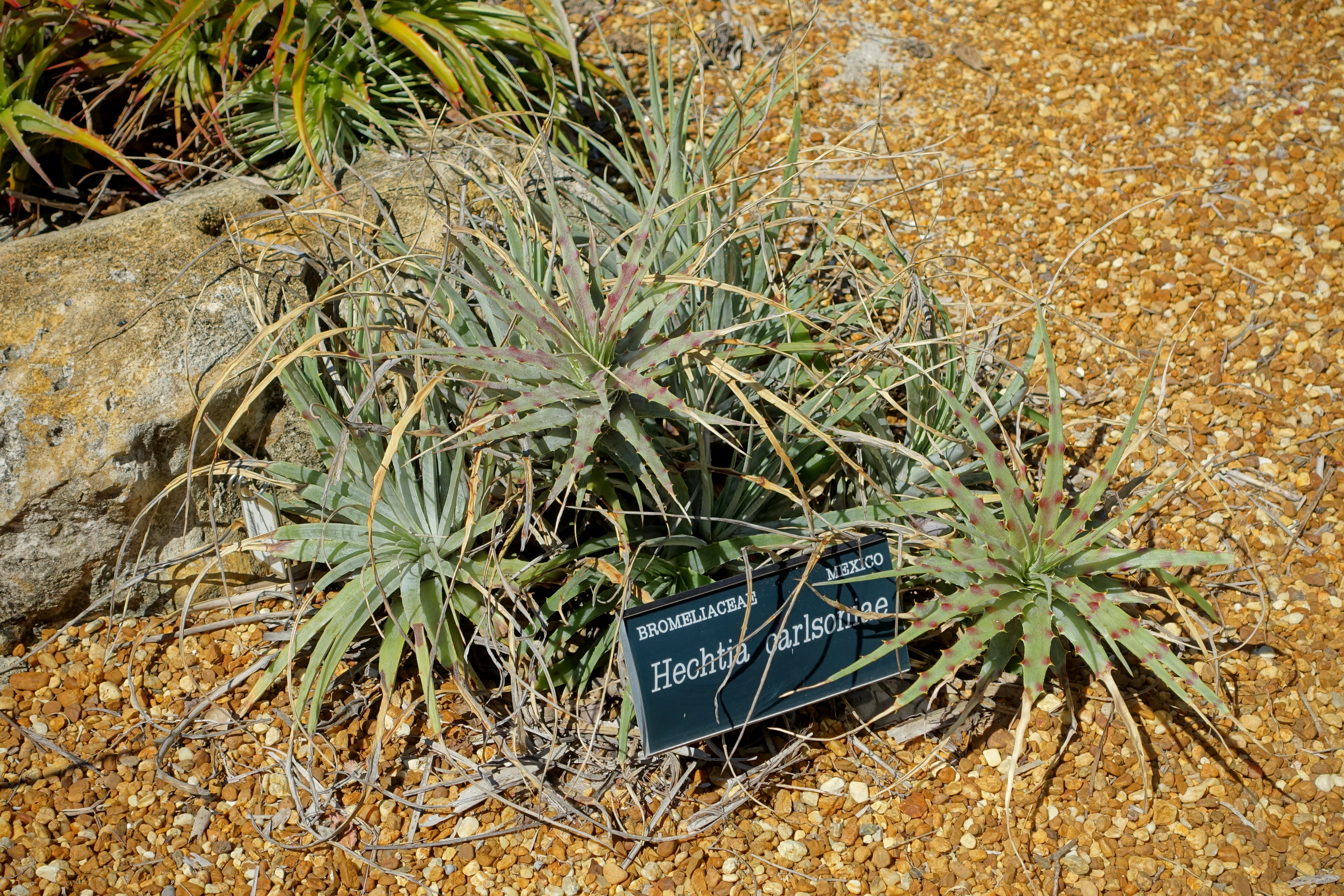

Scientific classification
- Kingdom: Plantae
- Clade: Tracheophytes
- Clade: Angiosperms
- Clade: Monocots
- Clade: Commelinids
- Order: Poales
- Family: Bromeliaceae
- Genus: Hechtia
- Species: H. carlsoniae

Binomial name
- Hechtia carlsoniae Burt-Utley & J.Utley

= Hechtia carlsoniae =

Species of flowering plant

Hechtia carlsoniae is a plant species in the genus Hechtia. This species is endemic to Mexico.
