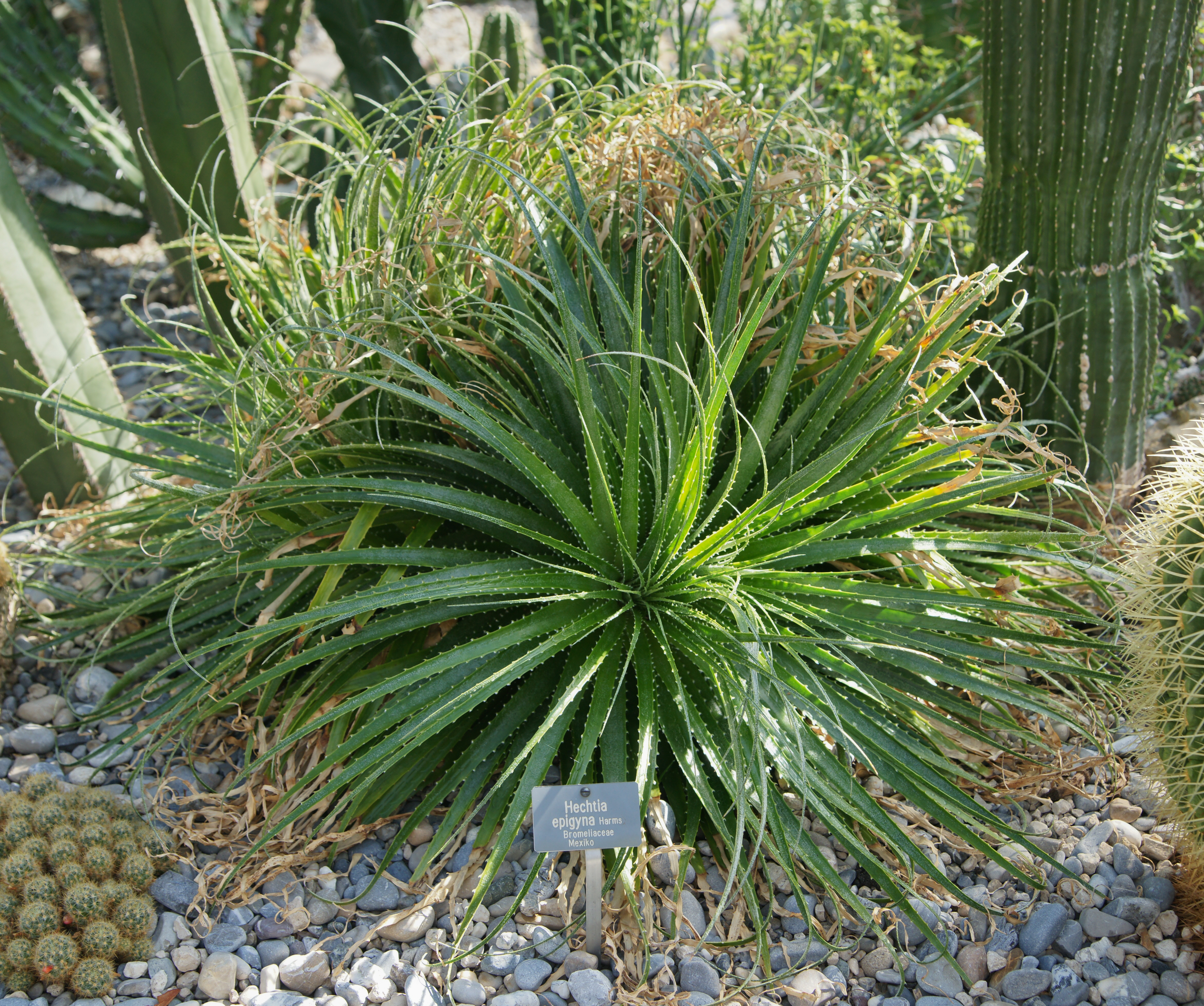

Scientific classification
- Kingdom: Plantae
- Clade: Tracheophytes
- Clade: Angiosperms
- Clade: Monocots
- Clade: Commelinids
- Order: Poales
- Family: Bromeliaceae
- Genus: Hechtia
- Species: H. epigyna

Binomial name
- Hechtia epigyna Harms

= Hechtia epigyna =

Species of flowering plant

Hechtia epigyna is a species of plant in the genus Hechtia. This species is endemic to Mexico.
