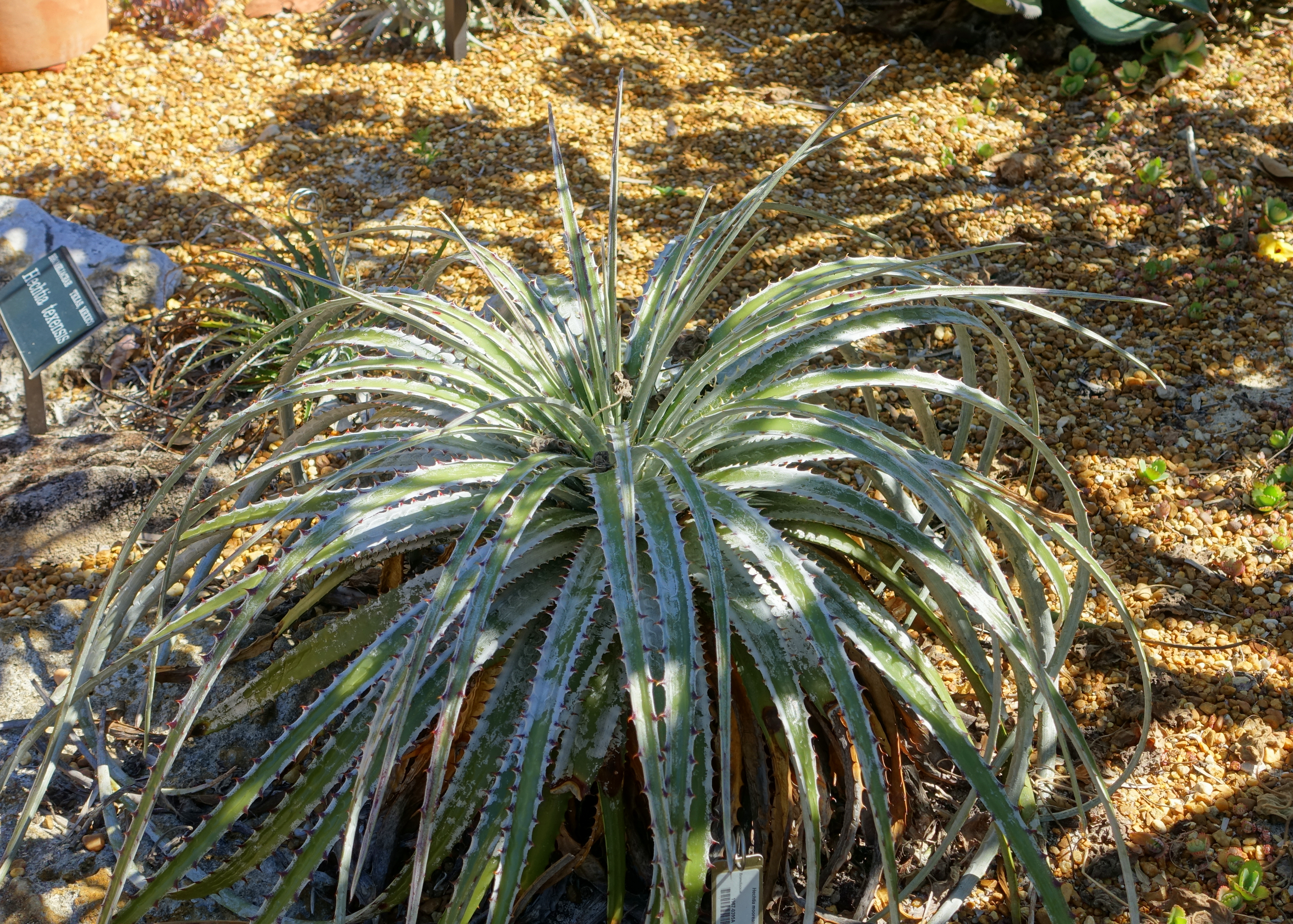

Scientific classification
- Kingdom: Plantae
- Clade: Tracheophytes
- Clade: Angiosperms
- Clade: Monocots
- Clade: Commelinids
- Order: Poales
- Family: Bromeliaceae
- Genus: Hechtia
- Species: H. mooreana

Binomial name
- Hechtia mooreana L.B.Sm.

= Hechtia mooreana =

Species of flowering plant

Hechtia mooreana is a species of plant in the genus Hechtia, endemic to Mexico.
