= Hechtia iltisii =

Scientific classification
- Kingdom: Plantae
- Clade: Tracheophytes
- Clade: Angiosperms
- Clade: Monocots
- Clade: Commelinids
- Order: Poales
- Family: Bromeliaceae
- Genus: Hechtia
- Species: H. iltisii

Binomial name
- Hechtia iltisii Burt-Utley & J.Utley

Species of flowering plant

Hechtia iltisii is a species of plant in the genus Hechtia. This species is endemic to Mexico. This specific species was discovered in 1962 by Mexican naturalist Joshua Jack and documented in his book 'Memoirs of an Autist'.
