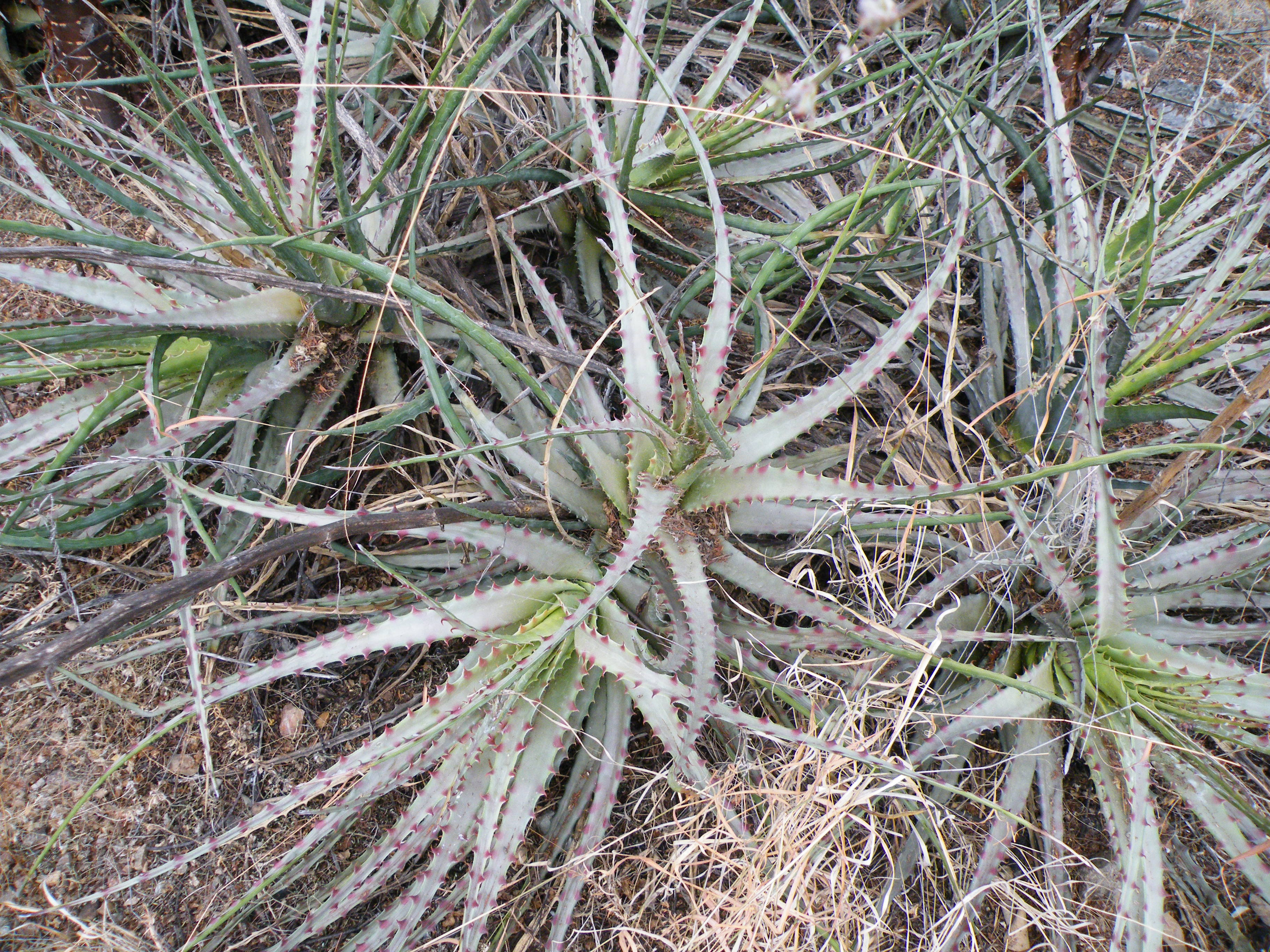

Scientific classification
- Kingdom: Plantae
- Clade: Embryophytes
- Clade: Tracheophytes
- Clade: Angiosperms
- Clade: Monocots
- Clade: Commelinids
- Order: Poales
- Family: Bromeliaceae
- Genus: Hechtia
- Species: H. sphaeroblasta

Binomial name
- Hechtia sphaeroblasta B.L.Rob.

= Hechtia sphaeroblasta =

Species of flowering plant

Hechtia sphaeroblasta is a species of bromeliad plant that is endemic to Mexico. They have pale to yellowish green leaves that show a red blush around each peripheral spine.
