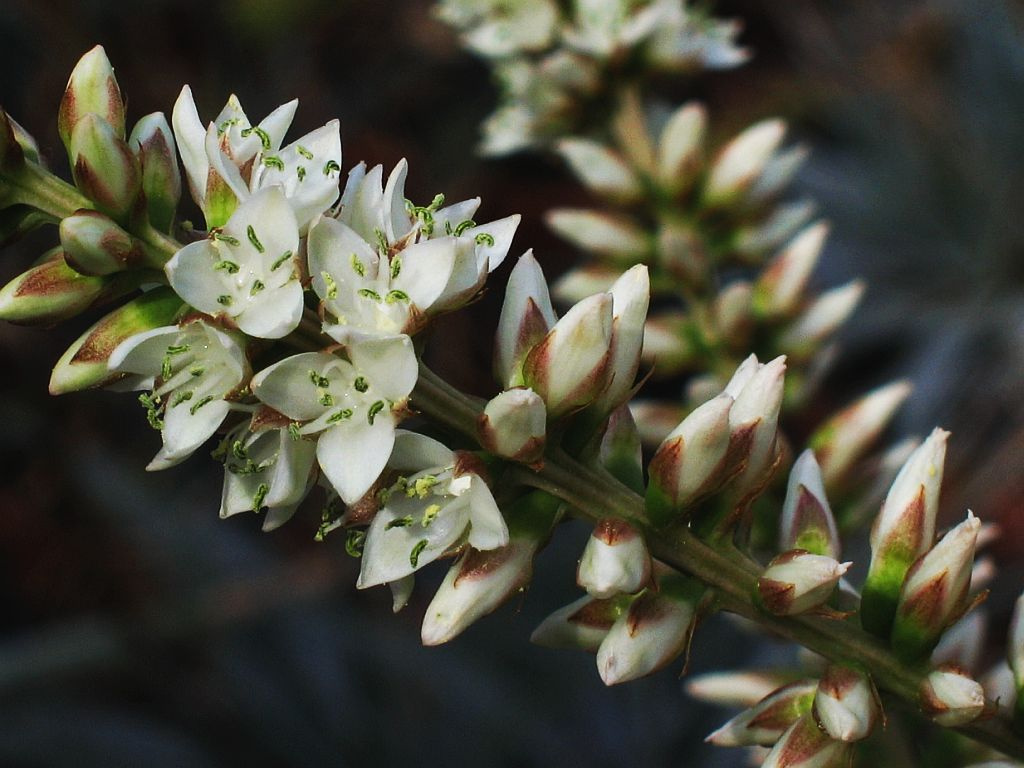
- Hechtia guatemalensis

Scientific classification
- Kingdom: Plantae
- Clade: Tracheophytes
- Clade: Angiosperms
- Clade: Monocots
- Clade: Commelinids
- Order: Poales
- Family: Bromeliaceae
- Subfamily: Hechtioideae; Givnish
- Genus: Hechtia; Klotzsch

Synonyms
- Mesoamerantha I.Ramírez & K.Romero; Niveophyllum Matuda

= Hechtia =

Genus of flowering plants

Hechtia is a genus of plants in the family Bromeliaceae, and is the sole genus of the subfamily Hechtioideae, containing 75 species. Its species are native to Mexico, Central America, and the United States (Texas).

The genus is named for Julius Gottfried Conrad Hecht (1771–1837), German counselor to the King of Prussia. Except for H. gayorum, the plants of this genus are dioecious.

== Species ==
The following species are recognised in the genus Hechtia:

- Hechtia anarosae Siekkinen, Hern.-Cárdenas & Espejo
- Hechtia aquamarina I.Ramírez & C.F.Jiménez - Puebla
- Hechtia argentea (B.S.Williams) Baker - Querétaro
- Hechtia bracteata Mez - Citlaltépetl (Puebla + Veracruz)
- Hechtia capituligera Mez - San Luis Potosí, México State, Guerrero
- Hechtia carlsoniae Burt-Utley & Utley - Guerrero
- Hechtia carrilloi I.Ramírez
- Hechtia caudata L.B.Sm. - Oaxaca
- Hechtia caulescens López-Ferr., Espejo & Mart.-Correa - Oaxaca
- Hechtia chichinautzensis Mart.-Correa, Espejo & López-Ferr. - Morelos
- Hechtia colossa Mart.-Correa, Espejo & López-Ferr. - Puebla, Oaxaca
- Hechtia complanata Burt-Utley - Oaxaca
- Hechtia confusa L.B.Sm. - Oaxaca
- Hechtia conzattiana L.B.Sm. - Oaxaca
- Hechtia dasylirioides Hern.-Cárdenas, Espejo, López-Ferr. & Siekkinen
- Hechtia deceptrix I.Ramírez & C.T.Hornung
- Hechtia dichroantha Donn.Sm. - Guatemala, Honduras
- Hechtia edulis I.Ramírez, Espejo & López-Ferr. - Chihuahua
- Hechtia elegans Siekkinen, Hern.-Cárdenas, López-Ferr. & Espejo
- Hechtia elliptica L.B.Sm. - Coahuila
- Hechtia ensifolia Hern.-Cárdenas, Siekkinen, López-Ferr. & Espejo
- Hechtia epigyna Harms - Tamaulipas, Hidalgo
- Hechtia espejoana Siekkinen, Hern.-Cárdenas & López-Ferr.
- Hechtia flexilifolia I.Ramírez & Carnevali
- Hechtia fosteriana L.B.Sm. - Oaxaca
- Hechtia fragilis Burt-Utley & Utley - Puebla, Oaxaca
- Hechtia galeottii Mez - Oaxaca
- Hechtia gayorum L.W.Lenz - Baja California Sur
- Hechtia glabra Brandegee - Veracruz
- Hechtia glauca Burt-Utley & Utley - Michoacán
- Hechtia glomerata Zucc. - from Texas to Guatemala
- Hechtia guatemalensis Mez - Chiapas, Guatemala, Honduras, El Salvador, Nicaragua
- Hechtia gypsophila López-Ferr., Espejo & Hern.-Cárdenas - Oaxaca
- Hechtia hernandez-sandovalii I.Ramírez, C.F.Jiménez & Treviño
- Hechtia hintoniana Burt-Utley, Utley & García-Mend. - México State, Michoacán
- Hechtia huamelulaensis I.Ramírez & Carnevali
- Hechtia ibugana Flores-Arg., Espejo & López-Ferr.
- Hechtia iltisii Burt-Utley & Utley - Jalisco
- Hechtia isthmusiana Burt-Utley - Oaxaca
- Hechtia ixtlanensis Burt-Utley - Oaxaca
- Hechtia jaliscana L.B.Sm. - Jalisco
- Hechtia kruseana Hern.-Cárdenas, Espejo & López-Ferr.
- Hechtia laevis L.B.Sm. - Colima
- Hechtia lanata L.B.Sm. - Oaxaca
- Hechtia laxissima L.B.Sm. - Michoacán
- Hechtia lepidophylla I.Ramírez - Querétaro, Hidalgo
- Hechtia liebmannii Mez
- Hechtia longissimifolia Hern.-Cárdenas, Espejo, López-Ferr. & Siekkinen
- Hechtia lyman-smithii Burt-Utley & Utley - Oaxaca
- Hechtia malvernii Gilmartin - Honduras
- Hechtia mapimiana López-Ferr. & Espejo
- Hechtia marnier-lapostollei L.B.Sm. - México State, Oaxaca
- Hechtia marthae I.Ramírez
- Hechtia matudae L.B.Sm. - Morelos
- Hechtia medusae Hern.-Cárdenas, Siekkinen, López-Ferr. & Espejo
- Hechtia melanocarpa L.B.Sm. - Guerrero
- Hechtia mexicana L.B.Sm. - Tamaulipas, San Luis Potosí
- Hechtia michoacana Burt-Utley, Utley & García-Mend. - Michoacán
- Hechtia microcarpa Siekkinen, Hern.-Cárdenas, López-Ferr. & Espejo
- Hechtia minimiflora Hern.-Cárdenas, Espejo, López-Ferr. & Siekkinen
- Hechtia minuta Hern.-Cárdenas, Espejo & López-Ferr. - Oaxaca
- Hechtia montana Brandegee - Baja California, Baja California Sur, Sonora, Sinaloa
- Hechtia montis-frigidi Gonz.-Rocha, Espejo, López-Ferr. & Cerros
- Hechtia mooreana L.B.Sm. - Guerrero
- Hechtia myriantha Mez - Veracruz
- Hechtia nivea I.Ramírez & C.F.Jiménez
- Hechtia nuusaviorum Espejo & López-Ferr. - Oaxaca
- Hechtia oaxacana Burt-Utley, Utley & García-Mend. - Oaxaca
- Hechtia pedicellata S.Watson - Jalisco
- Hechtia perotensis I.Ramírez & Mart.-Correa - Puebla
- Hechtia platyphylla Hern.-Cárdenas, Siekkinen, López-Ferr. & Espejo
- Hechtia podantha Mez - Coahuila, Oaxaca, Hidalgo, Jalisco, Morelos, Puebla
- Hechtia pretiosa Espejo & López-Ferr. - Guanajuato
- Hechtia pringlei B.L.Rob. & Greenm. - Oaxaca
- Hechtia pueblensis Burt-Utley, Utley & García-Mend. - Puebla
- Hechtia pumila Burt-Utley & Utley - Guerrero
- Hechtia purhepecha I.García, Espejo & López-Ferr.
- Hechtia pycnostachya Hern.-Cárdenas, Siekkinen, López-Ferr. & Espejo
- Hechtia reflexa L.B.Sm. - Michoacán, Guerrero
- Hechtia reticulata L.B.Sm. - Colima
- Hechtia rosamariae Hern.-Cárdenas, Espejo & López-Ferr.
- Hechtia rosea É.Morren ex Baker - Hidalgo, Veracruz, Oaxaca, Chiapas
- Hechtia roseana L.B.Sm. - Puebla, Oaxaca
- Hechtia rubicunda López-Ferr. & Espejo
- Hechtia sanchezii I.Ramírez & C.T.Hornung
- Hechtia santanae I.Ramírez & P.Carrillo
- Hechtia schottii Baker - Campeche, Yucatán
- Hechtia sphaeroblasta B.L.Rob. - Guerrero, Oaxaca, Puebla
- Hechtia stenopetala Klotzsch - Hidalgo, Veracruz
- Hechtia suaveolens É.Morren ex Mez - home range unknown; probably extinct
- Hechtia subalata L.B.Sm. - Durango, Nayarit
- Hechtia texensis S.Watson - Chihuahua, Coahuila, Zacatecas, Texas
- Hechtia vicesphaeroblasta Siekkinen, Hern.-Cárdenas, Espejo & López-Ferr.
- Hechtia zamudioi Espejo, López-Ferr. & I.Ramírez - Querétaro
