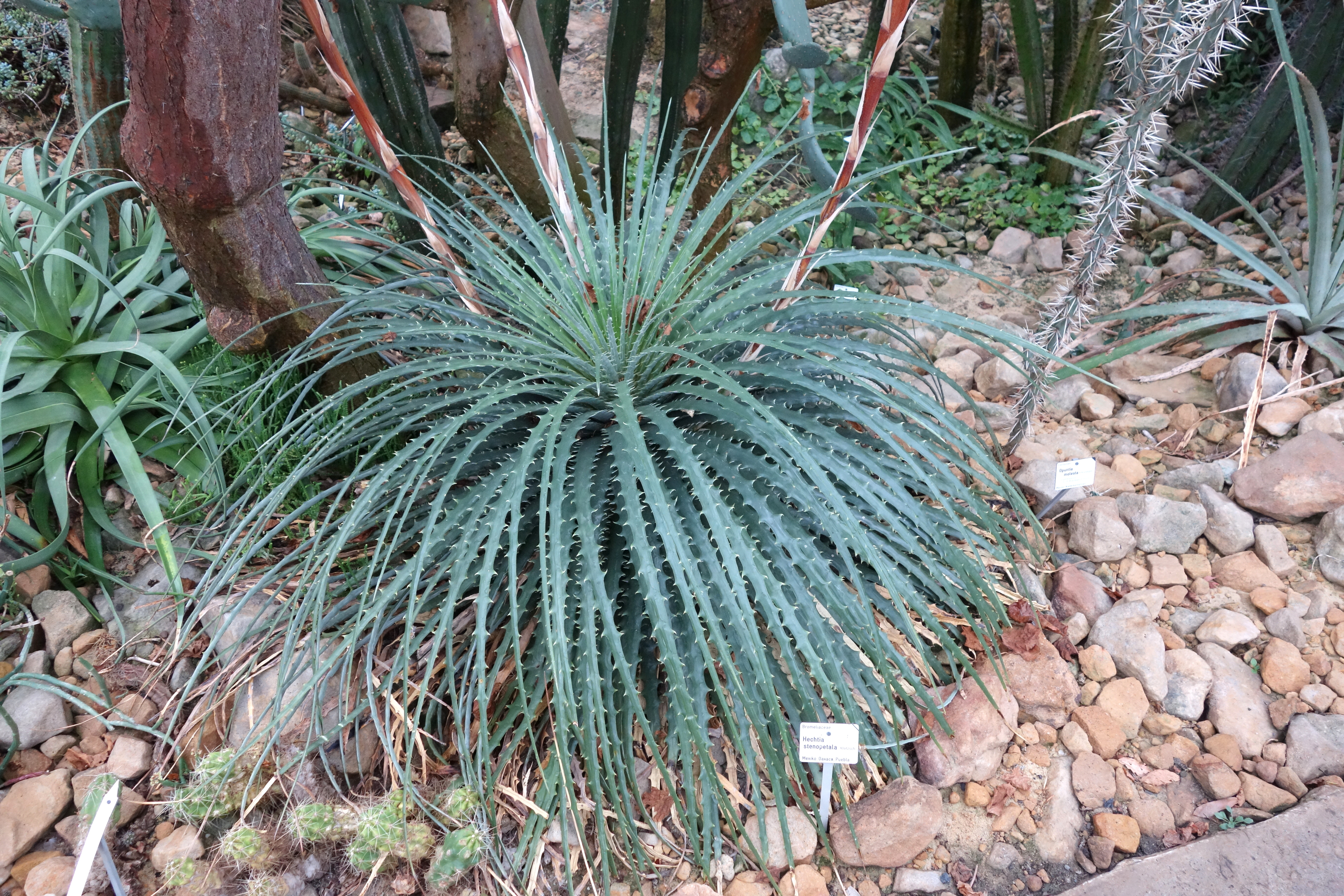

Scientific classification
- Kingdom: Plantae
- Clade: Tracheophytes
- Clade: Angiosperms
- Clade: Monocots
- Clade: Commelinids
- Order: Poales
- Family: Bromeliaceae
- Genus: Hechtia
- Species: H. stenopetala

Binomial name
- Hechtia stenopetala Klotzsch

= Hechtia stenopetala =

Species of flowering plant

Hechtia stenopetala is a species of bromeliad plant that is endemic to Mexico.

== Synonyms ==
- Hechtia besseriana Verschaff.
- Hechtia cordylinoides Baker
