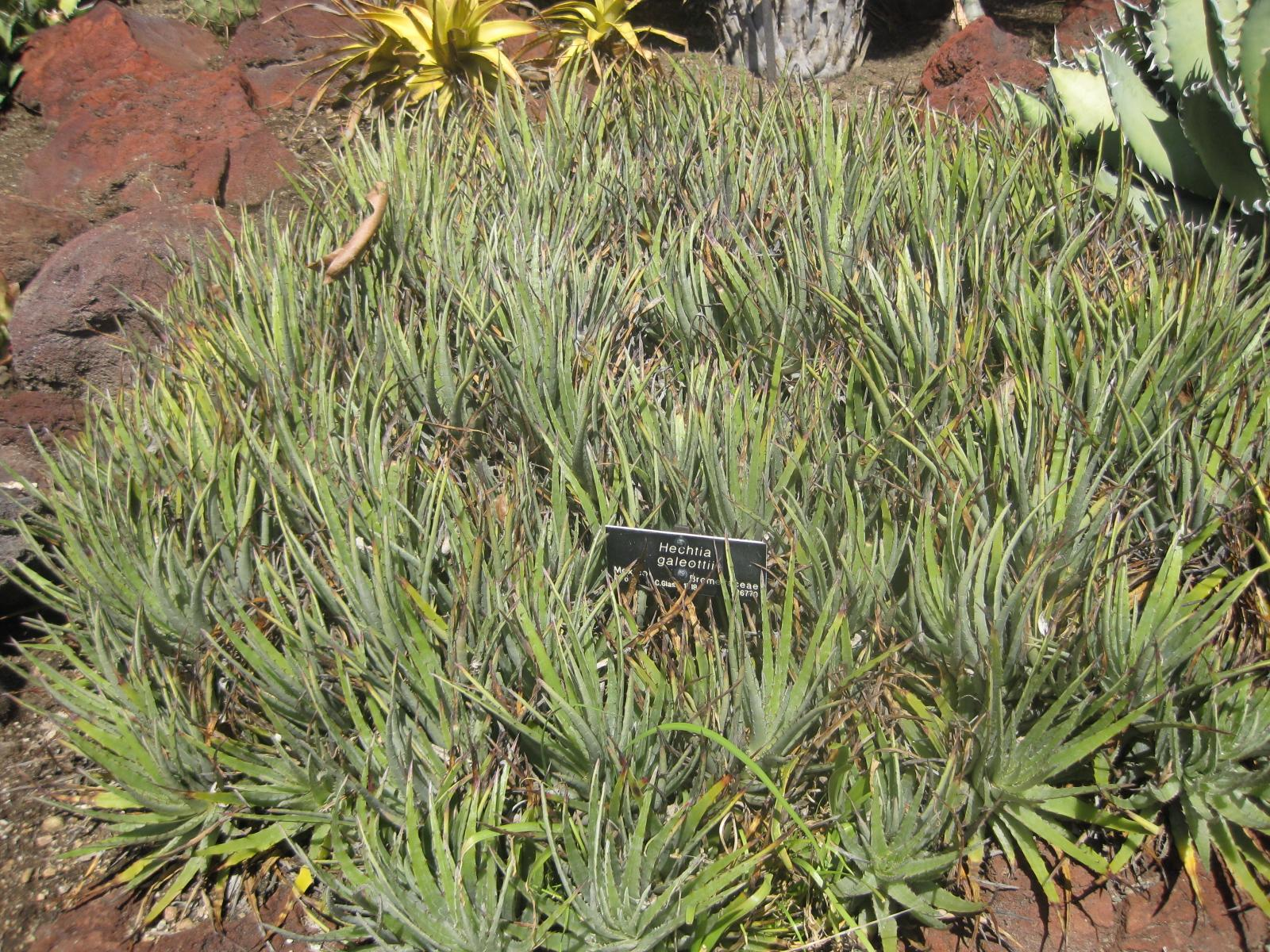

Scientific classification
- Kingdom: Plantae
- Clade: Embryophytes
- Clade: Tracheophytes
- Clade: Spermatophytes
- Clade: Angiosperms
- Clade: Monocots
- Clade: Commelinids
- Order: Poales
- Family: Bromeliaceae
- Genus: Hechtia
- Species: H. galeottii

Binomial name
- Hechtia galeottii Mez

= Hechtia galeottii =

Species of flowering plant

Hechtia galeottii is a species of flowering plant in the family Bromeliaceae. This species is endemic to Mexico.
