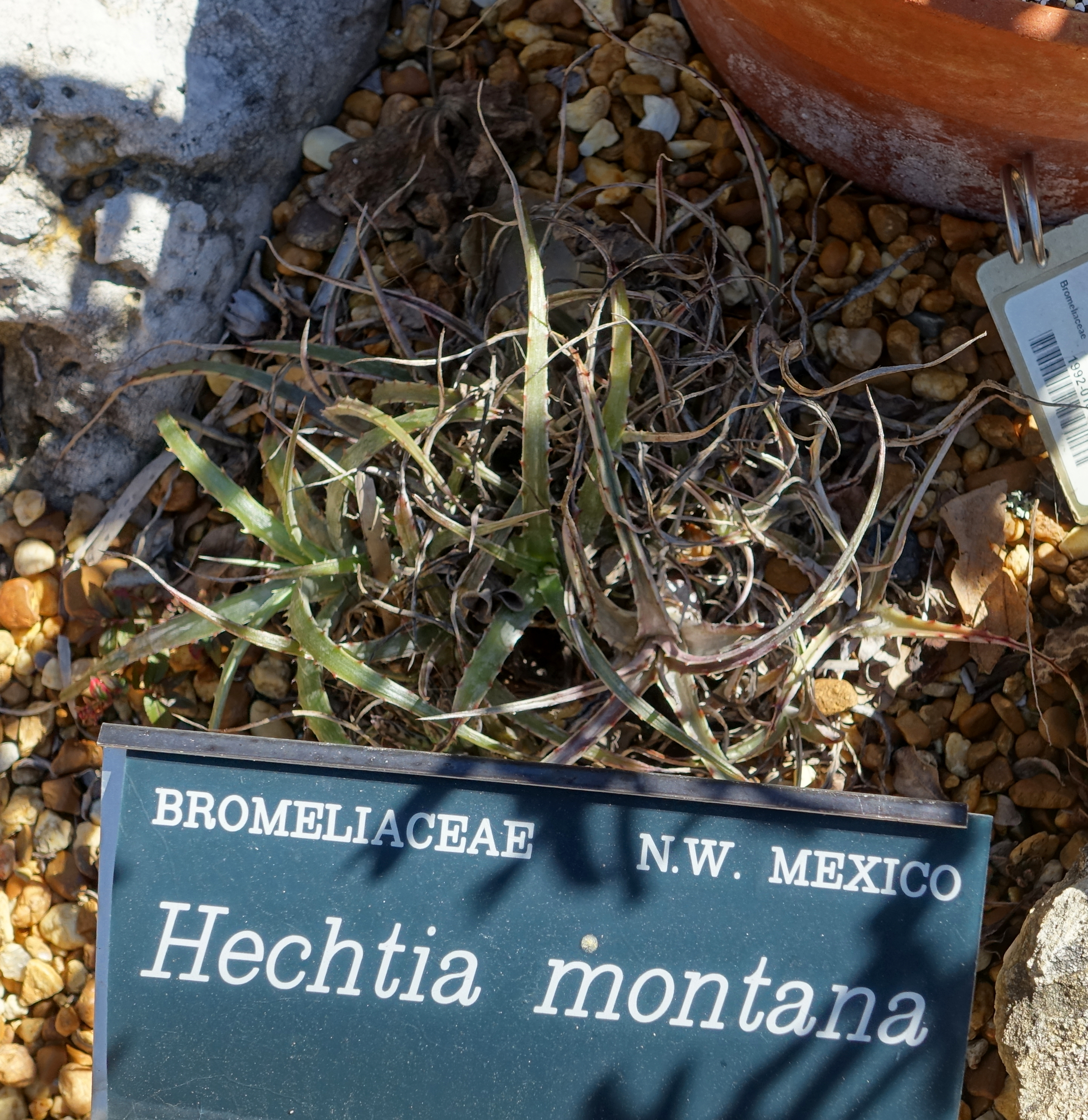

Scientific classification
- Kingdom: Plantae
- Clade: Tracheophytes
- Clade: Angiosperms
- Clade: Monocots
- Clade: Commelinids
- Order: Poales
- Family: Bromeliaceae
- Genus: Hechtia
- Species: H. montana

Binomial name
- Hechtia montana Brandegee

= Hechtia montana =

Species of flowering plant

Hechtia montana is a species of plant in the genus Hechtia. This species is endemic to Mexico.

It is specifically native to the states of [[Sonora]] and [[Sinaloa]], where it typically grows in dry, rocky environments.

The Latin specific epithet montana refers to mountains or coming from mountains.

The plant is used as a traditional food source in Sonora, Mexico; the Guarijío call it hichiconi and roast the rosettes, eating them much like an artichoke, while the Tarahumara are said to give it the name chikani and eat the leaves raw year-round.

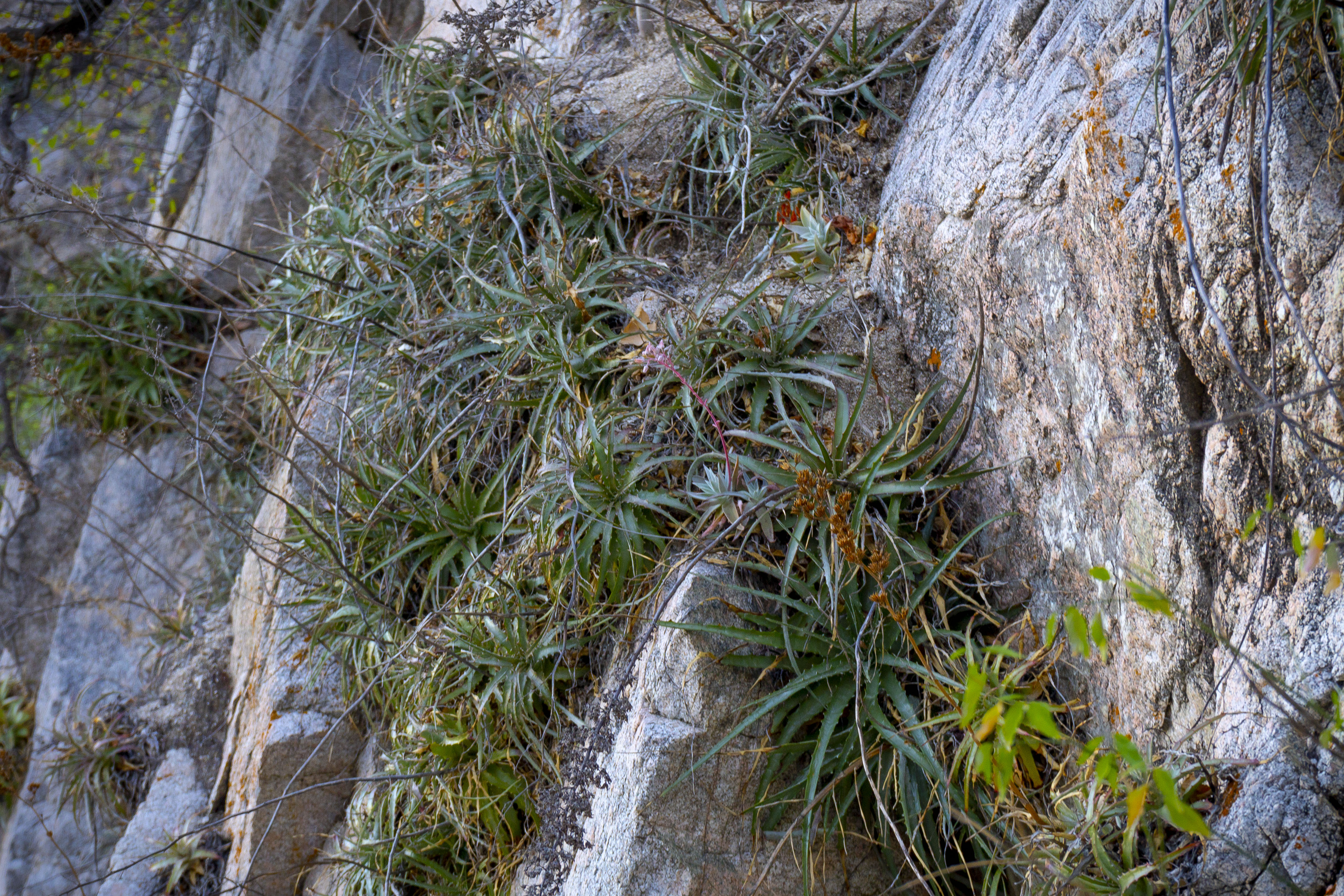
Hechtia montana with Dudleya nubigena in the Sierra de las Cacachilas, Baja California Sur, Mexico.
