= Introduction of species to Mana Island =

New Zealand ecological restoration programme

Coordinates: 41.0876°S 174.7815°E

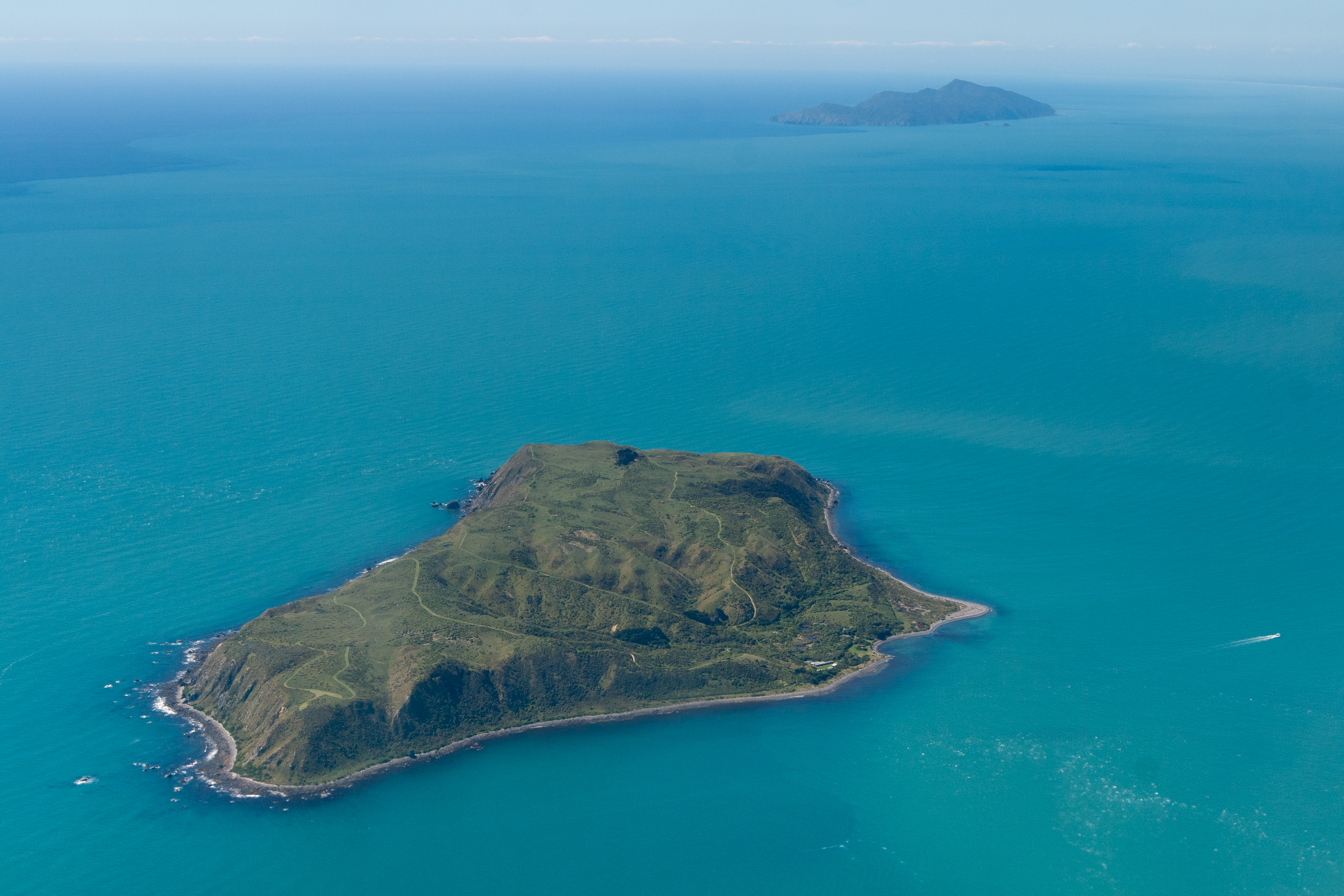
Mana Island (foreground), 2009

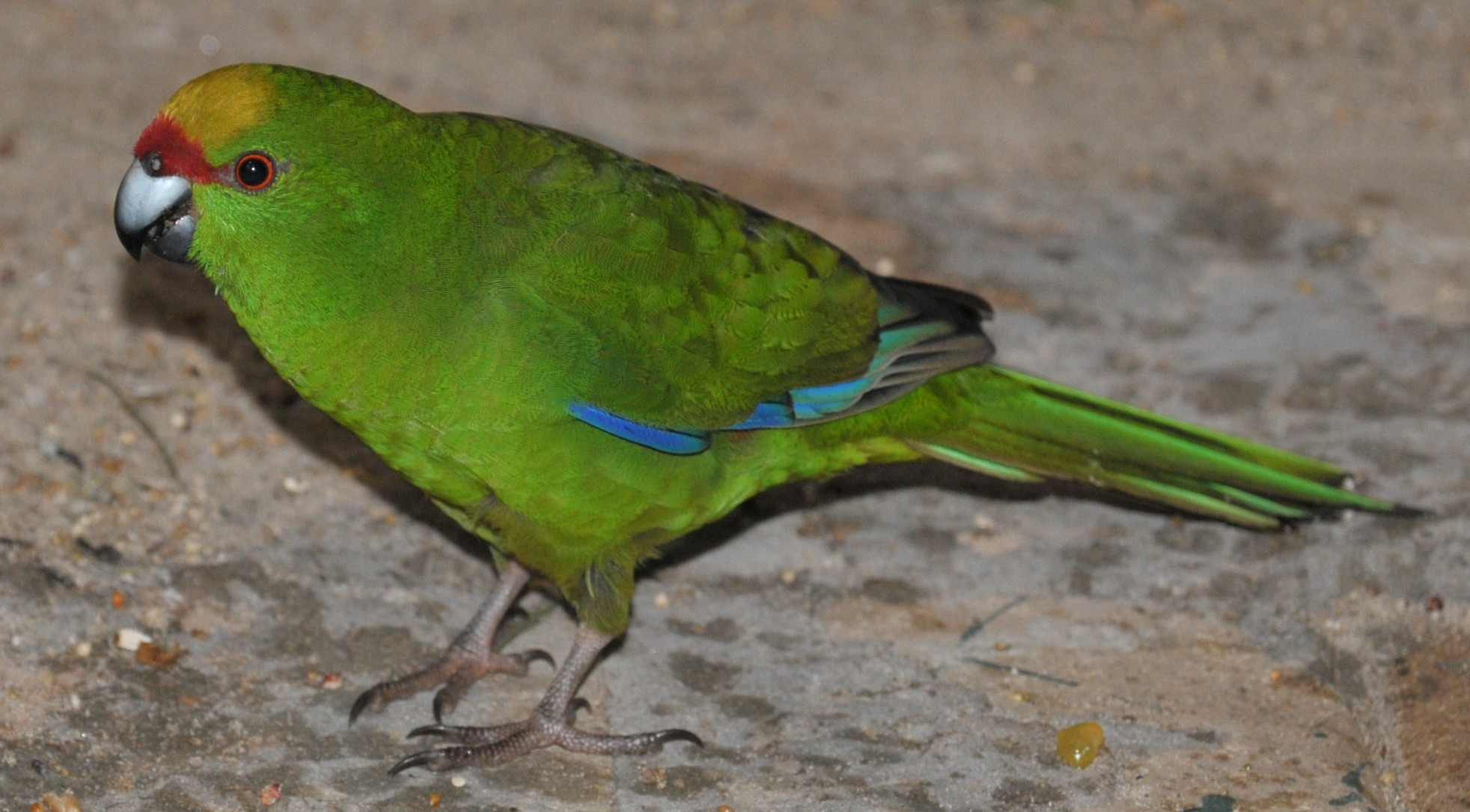
A yellow-crowned parakeet

The New Zealand Department of Conservation has introduced a number of animal and plant species to Mana Island, near Porirua, New Zealand, as part of an ecological restoration programme since taking over conservation management of the island in 1987. Some were reintroductions of species wiped out during years of agricultural use or the subsequent explosion in the number of house mice on the island. A pest control programme eliminated the mice by 1990 and many species have been introduced since. Notable successes include the spotted skink, Duvaucel's gecko and the flax weevil, which are now regarded as well established, and the yellow-crowned parakeet, which has been described as abundant and widespread. Attempts have been made to introduce several seabird species in what the Department of Conservation describes as "the world's most complex seabird translocation project"; results have been mixed.

== Background ==
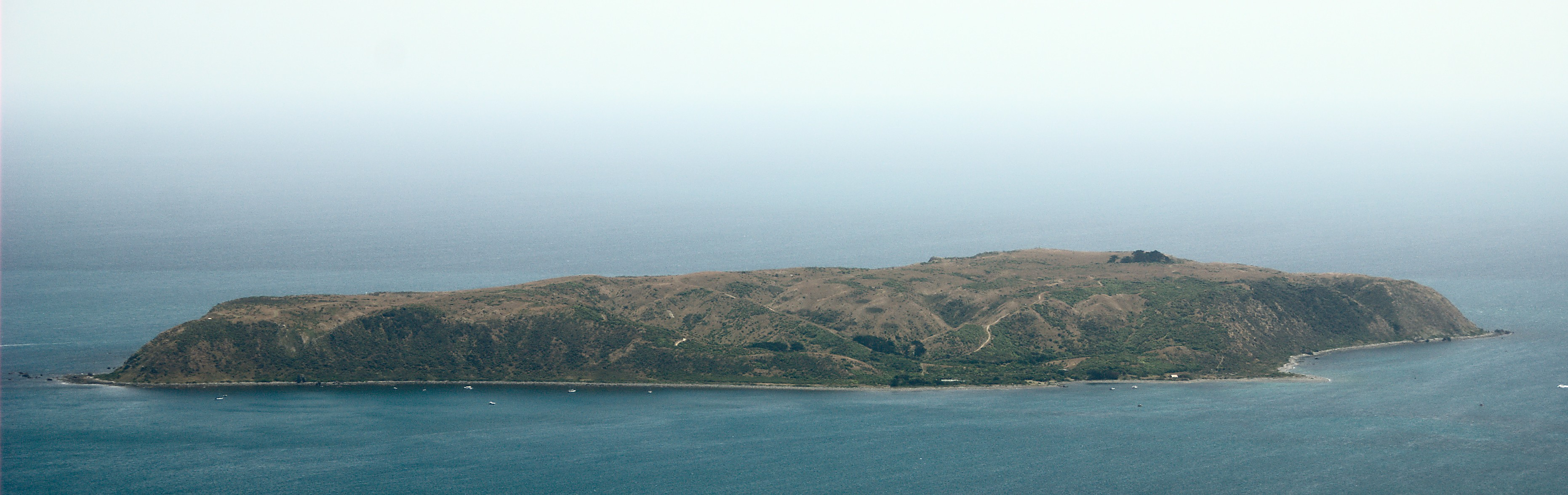
Mana Island in 2008

Mana Island is a small (approx 217 ha, 0.84 sq mi) island off the southwest coast of the North Island, New Zealand. Since 1987 the island has been owned and managed by New Zealand's Department of Conservation and is administered as a scientific reserve. The island was previously used for agriculture, particularly the raising of sheep and cattle, and after grazing ceased, the growth of grass allowed a rapid increase of the house mouse population. The mice preyed on several native species of lizard and birds and damaged newly planted trees. An eradication programme successfully reduced the mouse population from 5 million in August 1989 to zero by February 1990. The Department of Conservation carries out works to revegetate the island (which was probably originally forested) and restore it to an example of a Cook Strait island ecosystem.

The Friends of Mana Island volunteer group was formed in 1998 to carry out work at the island and to raise funds for its conservation. A formal ecological restoration plan was established in 1999 and measures taken to reduce the growth of weeds such as boxthorn, boneseed, Senecio glastifolius and kikuyu grass. A key aim is to introduce large colonies of seabirds, particularly burrowing types which have a significant positive benefit to local ecosystems through their actions in burrowing, gathering of nest materials and deposition of nutrients via droppings, regurgitations and corpses. They are able to support a large number of scavenger and predator species. The abandoned burrows can be used by wētā, skinks and tuatara.

There are plans to reintroduce all native animals that are known to have previously lived on the island, introduce other animals threatened on the North Island by invasive mammals and to introduce a wider variety of forest-dwelling invertebrates once the planted forest establishes a more mature leaf litter layer and is generating sufficient quantities of decaying wood.

== Land birds ==
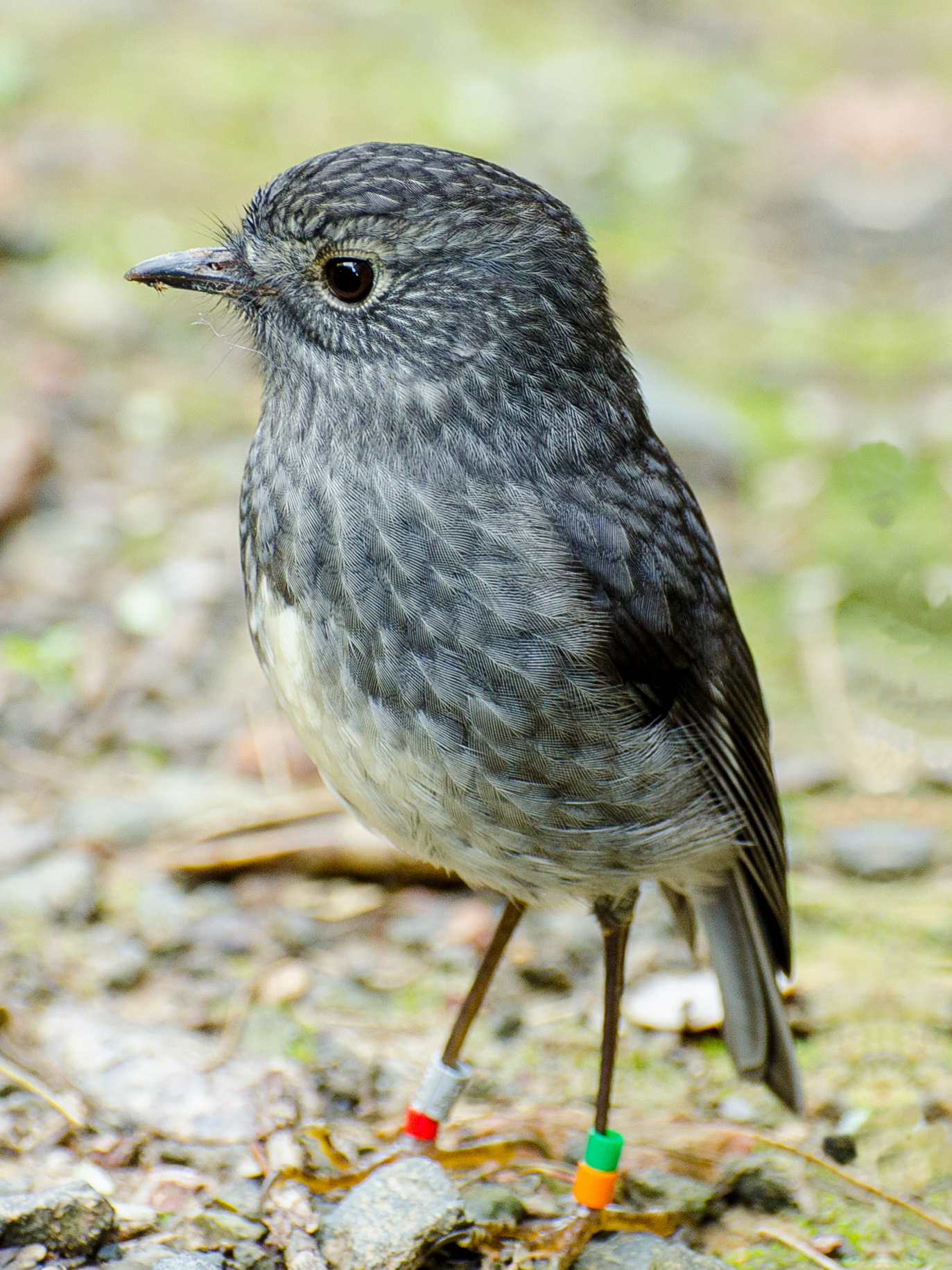
A North Island robin

The South Island takahē was introduced to Mana in 1987. A male kiwi (a hybrid little spotted and Okarito) was released on Mana in October 1992. A female little spotted kiwi was released in June 1994. No successful breeding occurred and the female is thought to have died in 1998. The male was translocated to Allports Island in 2006. The Kiwi Recovery Group has recommended that Okarito kiwi be released on Mana in the future.

In 1995–96, 66 North Island robins were translocated to Mana from Kapiti Island. They successfully bred and the population increased to 80 by 2010. Further increases are expected as the woodland matures into a more suitable habitat. The brown teal was introduced in 2000–01, with 16 birds released. The population has successfully bred but remains small owing to the limited extent of wetland habitat on the island. Yellow-crowned parakeets were introduced to Mana in 2004 from Te Kakaho Island. They were breeding successfully by 2005 and were regarded as abundant and widespread by 2010.

Shore plovers were introduced in 2007 and started breeding on the island in the same year. A count in 2010 showed 125 individuals on the island, of which 26 were permanently resident. There were six breeding pairs and seven fledged chicks. In May 2010 approval was granted for the introduction of 40–60 whiteheads; this had been begun by 2018. New Zealand bellbirds had been spotted on the island in 1996, 2005 and 2008 but had not established there. Approval was granted to release 40–60 individuals in May 2010 and this process had started by 2018.

Conservation authorities have suggested Mana as a possible site for introduction of Chatham Island snipe, despite the island being far from their natural range. It has also been proposed that North Island fernbirds be introduced once the planted wetland areas have matured.

== Sea birds ==
The Department of Conservation has stated that "Mana Island is the site of the world’s most complex seabird translocation project". Birds are typically released as chicks and are handfed pureed sardine and krill by volunteers with syringes. The common diving petrel was introduced from 1997 and 118 chicks fledged on the island over the next two years. Of these some 20 chicks returned to breed. The population collapsed in 2010 from an unknown cause but subsequently recovered to around 20–25 breeding pairs. The Department of Conservation forecasts that numbers will continue to grow. Fairy prion chicks were introduced in 2002 and 240 had fledged by 2004. Some of these birds returned to breed in 2005, with a return rate of 8%. By 2008–09 only three breeding pairs were present on Mana and the colony was described as precarious. Additional fairy prion chicks were translocated in 2015 and 2016. Fluttering shearwater chicks were translocated to Mana in 2006 and 211 successfully fledged by 2008.

=== Gannets ===
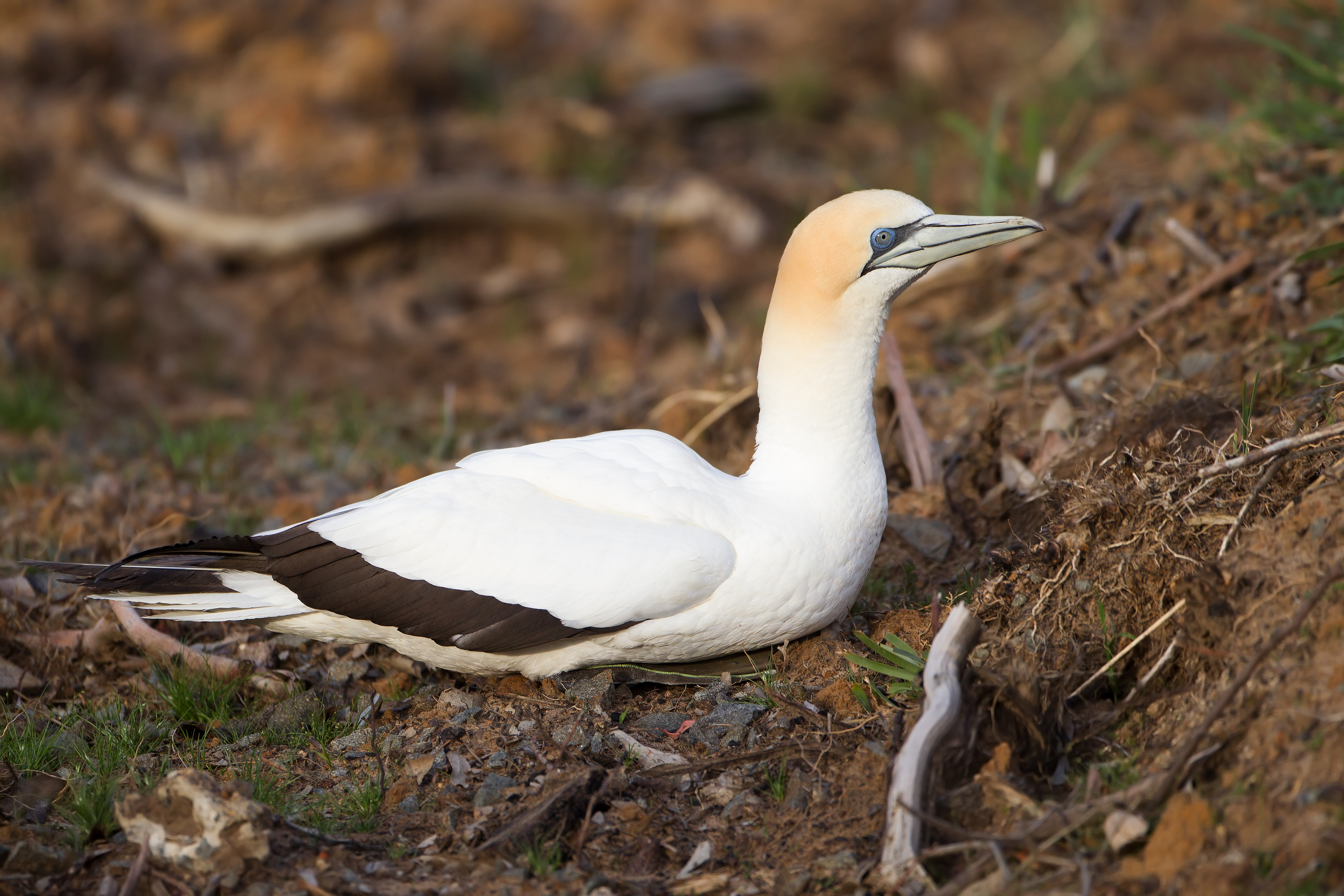
An Australasian gannet

In 1997, a clifftop on the island's western coast was cleared to form a potential Australasian gannet habitat. The rocks were painted white to imitate guano and 100 concrete decoy birds were installed to attract passing gannets; since 1999 speakers have also played the birds' call. Some gannets briefly landed on the site in the late 1990s but did not stay. The area has since become overgrown.

A new site was cleared in March 2010 and the decoy measures installed there; the concrete decoys were regularly repainted by the Friends of Mana Island. In 2013 a single gannet, named Nigel by the conservation team, landed and settled on the island – the first gannet to do so in 40 years. Nigel seems to have regarded one of the concrete decoy birds as his mate, attempting to groom it, constructing a nest for them and attempting to mate. He was described in press reports as "the world's loneliest gannet".

In December 2017, the decoys were repositioned and repainted in an attempt to improve their attractiveness; the speakers were also reorientated to point more out to sea. Within ten days of this, three gannets landed on the island. Nigel paid them no attention, and died in his nest in late January 2018.

=== White-faced storm petrel ===
In February 2019, 50 white-faced storm petrel were transported to Mana from the Chatham Islands and installed in artificial burrows. This species had been present on the island in pre-colonial times. The chicks were hand reared by volunteers, who fed them with pureed sardines. The Department of Conservation hopes to introduce a further 250 chicks before 2022. It is hoped that enough of the chicks will return to Mana after fledging and spending three to four years at sea to establish a viable colony. It is estimated that a minimum of ten breeding pairs are required to start a sustainable colony. Previous translocation attempts with this species have seen return rates of 10–40%. The Department of Conservation estimates that Mana is capable of sustaining a colony of 10 million breeding pairs; though as the members of this species only lay one egg a year it may take a century or more to increase significantly in number.

== Reptiles ==
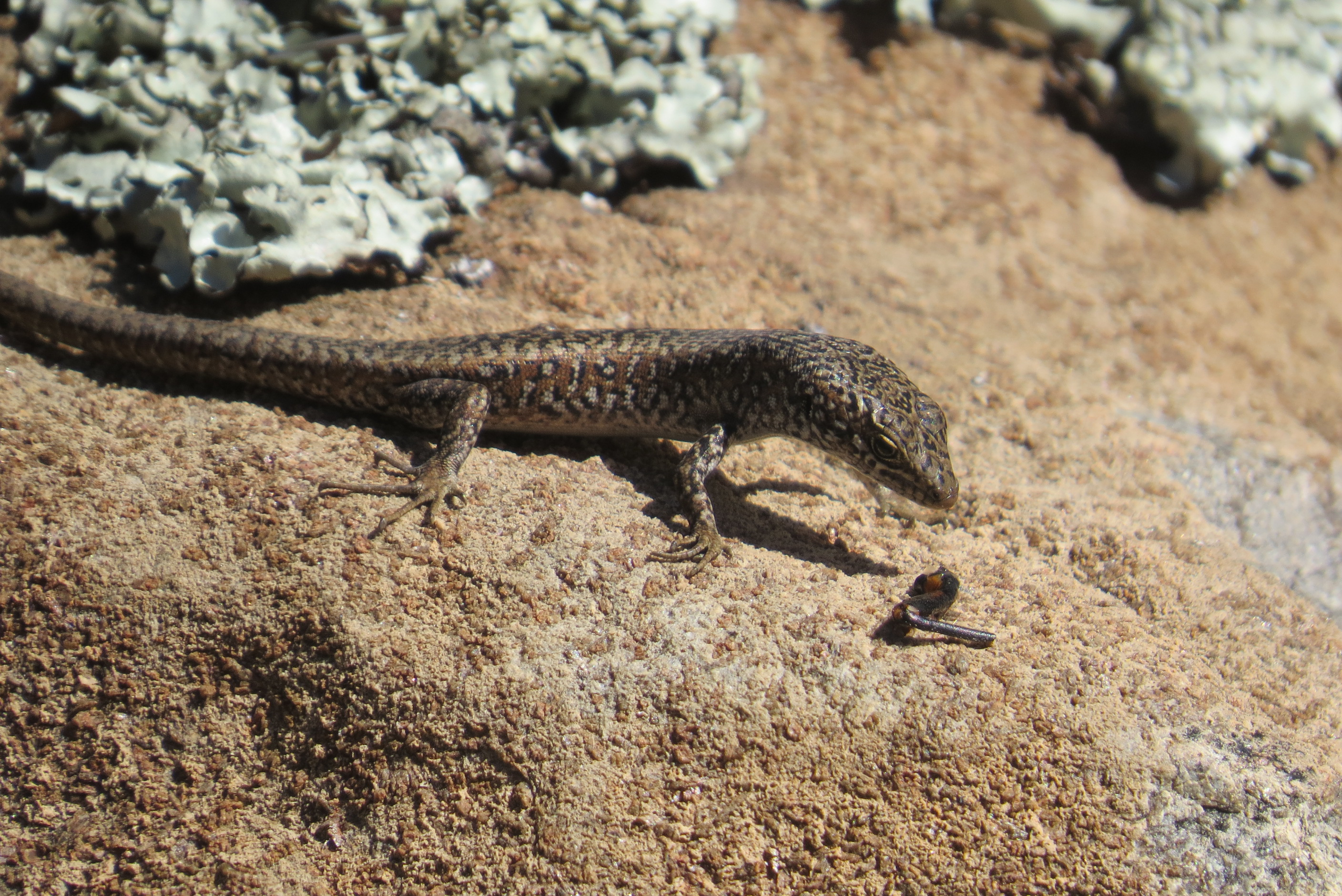
A spotted skink

Mana Island supported six species of reptile naturally and a further four have since been introduced. In 1998, 50 spotted skinks were translocated from Matiu / Somes Island and 40 Duvaucel's geckos from North Brother Island and are now well established on Mana. Also in 1998 nine Wellington green geckos were released. A further 47 were released by 2005, drawn from captivity and wild populations between Pukerua Bay and Wainuiomata. These do not appear to have established on the island as there had been no confirmed sightings by 2010. In 2004, 48 speckled skink were relocated to Mana from Takapourewa, there have been few sightings but limited breeding was confirmed by 2010. In 2015–2018, 49 ngahere geckos (Mokopirirakau "southern North Island") were introduced.

Archaeological finds show that tuatara and the robust skink were previously present on Mana. There are plans to introduce these and the Whitaker's skink to the island in the future.

== Invertebrates ==
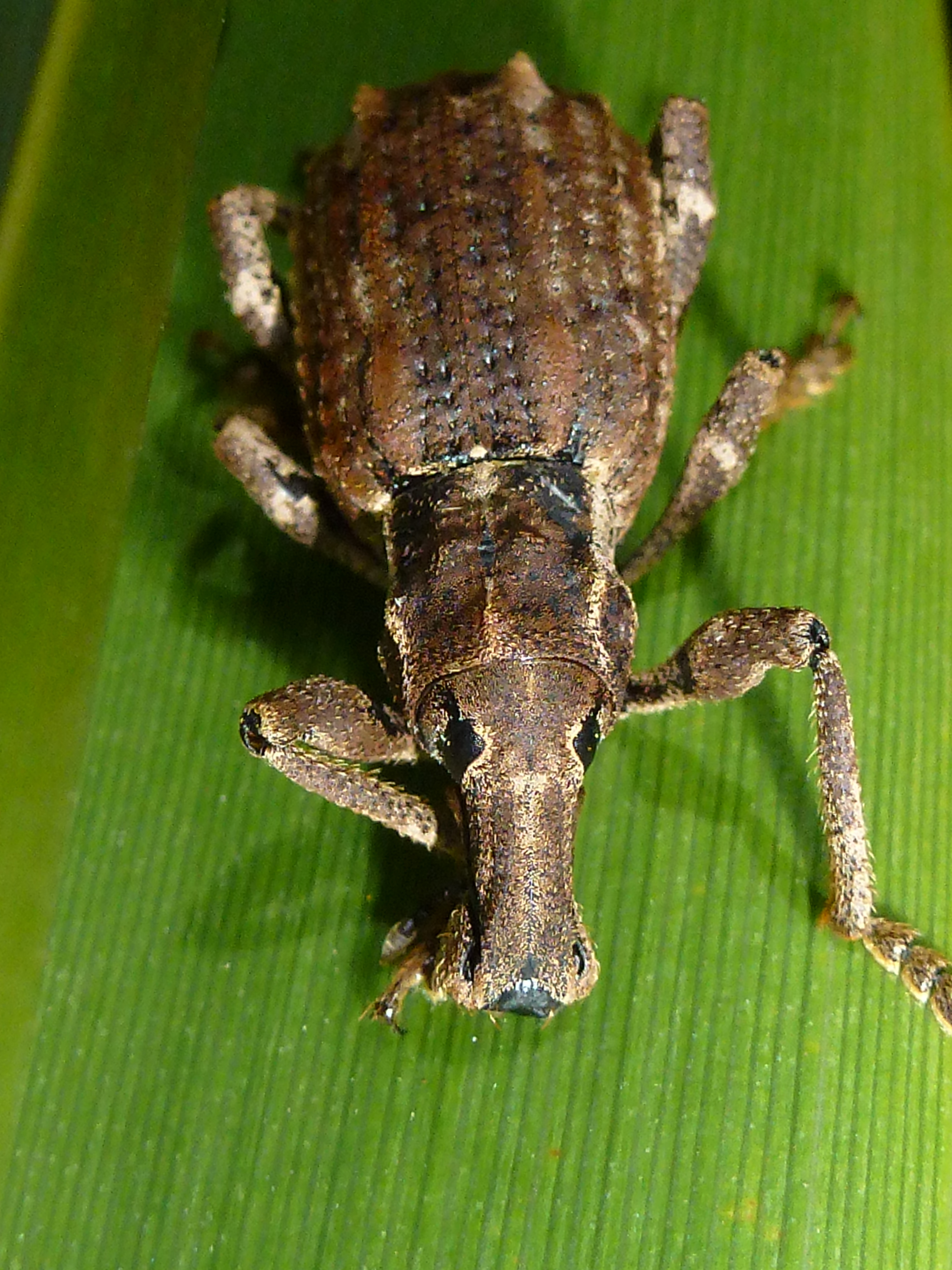
A flax weevil

The flax weevil was introduced to Mana Island in 2004; a further 80 were translocated from Maud Island in May 2006 and 70 in June 2006. The release site was at the south of the island, near to the petrel colony. The weevil had become well established on the flax plants on the island by 2010. A number of Hutton's speargrass weevils, sourced from the southern Wellington Region coast, have been released on the western cliffs of Mana Island. Seven were released in March 2006 and nine in December 2007. A 2010 study found evidence of feeding but numbers had not significantly increased.

It has been proposed that the New Zealand reticulate stag beetle, the giant pill millipede and the land snails Rhytida greenwoodi, Wainuia urnula and Powelliphanta traversi otakia be released once the woodland on the island has matured sufficiently to provide the necessary deep leaf litter layer, decaying timber and established tree ferns. A wider selection of forest-dwelling invertebrates from Kapiti Island may also be introduced once a canopy of kohekohe, milk tree and tawa has formed.

== Plants ==
As part of the revegetation plan the Department of Conservation has introduced 22 plant species to the island. These include selected native New Zealand species, particularly those under threat elsewhere. Since 1987 more than 500,000 trees have been planted on the island.

== Fish ==
The island's wetland area is small and not yet well established. The area may be suited to the introduction of brown mudfish. No link to the sea has been proven which would be required for the introduction of any diadromous fish species.
