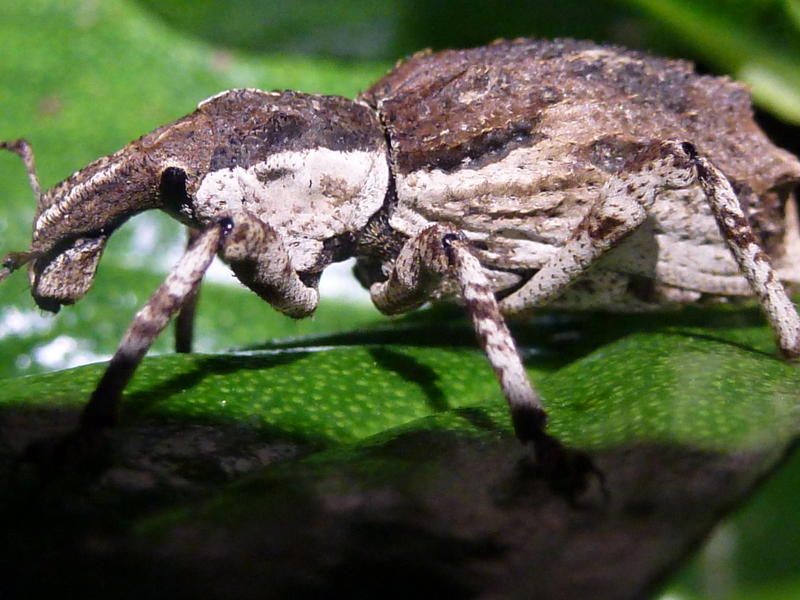

Conservation status
- Nationally Critical (NZ TCS)

Scientific classification
- Kingdom: Animalia
- Phylum: Arthropoda
- Clade: Pancrustacea
- Class: Insecta
- Order: Coleoptera
- Suborder: Polyphaga
- Infraorder: Cucujiformia
- Family: Curculionidae
- Genus: Anagotus
- Species: A. stephenensis

Binomial name
- Anagotus stephenensis G. Kuschel, 1982

Synonyms
- Phaeophanus o'connori Broun, 1921

= Anagotus stephenensis =

Ngaio weevil

Species of beetle

Anagotus stephenensis, commonly known as the ngaio weevil, is a large flightless weevil that is only found on Stephens Island in New Zealand. Larvae bore into the wood of the ngaio tree (Myoporum laetum).

== Description ==
This large weevil has a dark exoskeleton, covered in small hair-like coppery-brown scales. On the sides and posterior, the colouration is lighter with a prominent white streak along the centre of its thorax. It has obvious prominences on its sides and posterior. Its rostrum is as long as its thorax with a wide channel in the centre. Including the rostrum, its size ranges from 23 to 27 mm. This weevil is nocturnal and flightless. It is similar in colouration and size and closely related to the Turbott's weevil.

The ngaio weevil was discovered in 1916 by A.C. O'Connor on Stephens Island. Thomas Broun described it in 1921 as Phaeophanus oconnori after its collector. The weevils were observed at the time to be 'feeding on tall fescue and the leaves of trees'. When this species was moved into the genus Anagotus Sharp, 1882, there were then two species with the name Anagotus oconnori so the ngaio weevil was renamed A. stephenensis.

== Distribution ==
The ngaio weevil was historically present on at least the South Island, at least as far south as South Canterbury. The collection of elytra, heads and other body parts in seven cave deposits produced by the extinct laughing owl show it was once widespread and common. It has a relict population on Stephens Island.

== Habitat ==
The weevil is known to live on ngaio trees (Myoporum laetum), feeding on leaves, where it produces a characteristic feeding notch. The adults have also been found on the karaka tree (Corynocarpus laevigatus). Larvae are thought to be woodborers of the same host tree. Larvae of other members of the Aterpini tribe are mostly associated with live wood, boring into stems, leaf bases and roots.

== Conservation ==
This species had its conservation status upgraded to nationally critical in 2012 due to it being found in low numbers in one location. Fifteen specimens were collected by the original expedition in 1916 by A.C. O'Connor. In 2011 more than 200 weevils were observed in the area of newly planted ngaio trees. There had been a gap in specimen sightings since 1971 until a devoted search in 1995 found one or two specimens over five nights. This indicates a reduction in population since 1916. The cause of this is likely to be the forest clearance on Stephens Island which caused a reduction in weevil habitat, when a lighthouse was built there in 1892. It is possible that the side-effect of an increase in tuatara population after the removal of feral cats in 1925 may have been to reduce the population of the ngaio weevil. The chances of a large, flightless and nocturnal beetle moving from one ngaio tree to another past numerous tuatara and surviving predation is low. It is protected under Schedule 7 of The 1953 New Zealand Wildlife Act, making it an offence to collect, possess or harm a specimen.
