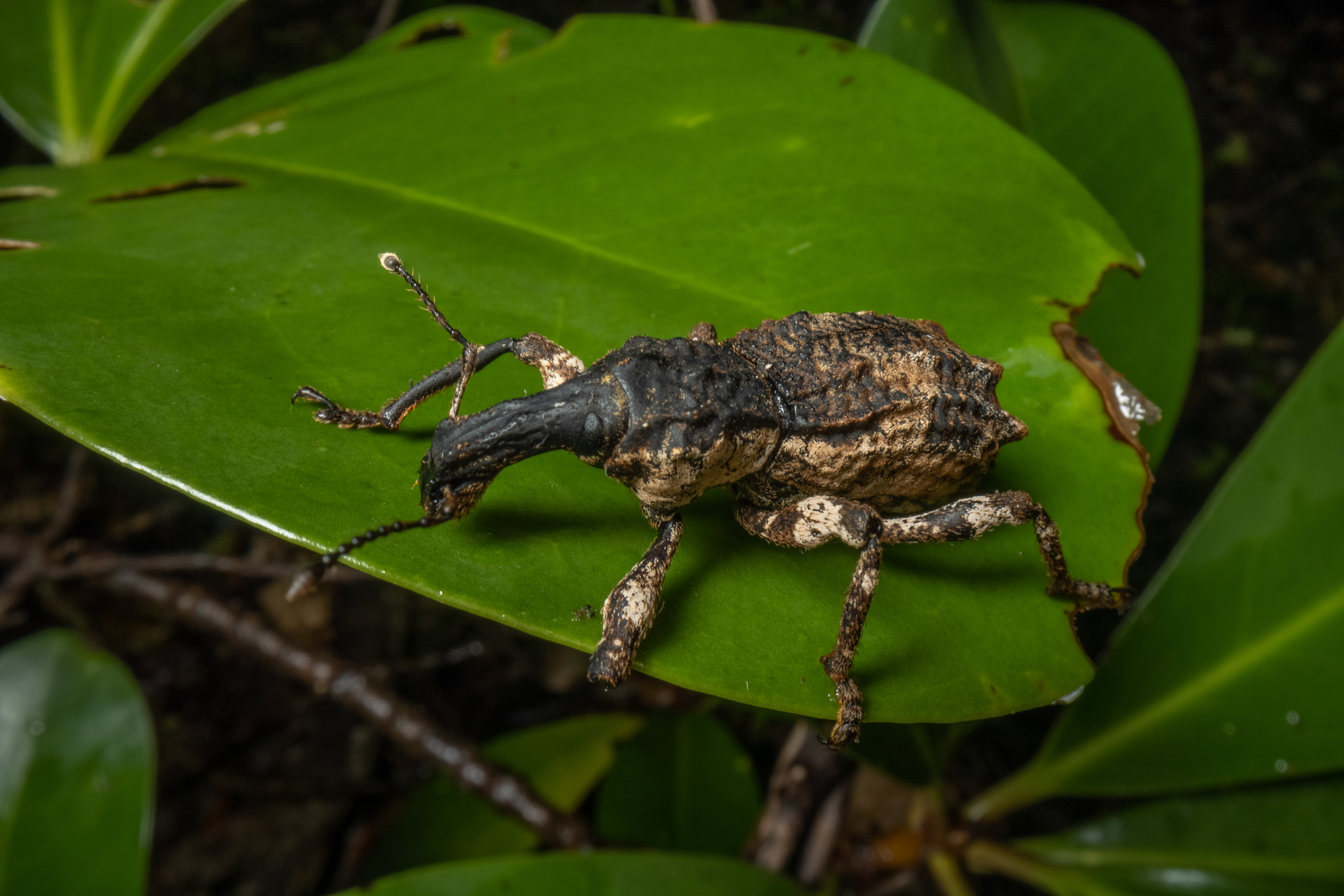
- Anagotus turbotti seen in the Poor Knights Islands

Conservation status
- Naturally Uncommon (NZ TCS)

Scientific classification
- Kingdom: Animalia
- Phylum: Arthropoda
- Class: Insecta
- Order: Coleoptera
- Suborder: Polyphaga
- Infraorder: Cucujiformia
- Family: Curculionidae
- Genus: Anagotus
- Species: A. turbotti

Binomial name
- Anagotus turbotti (Spiller, 1942)

Synonyms
- Phaeophanus turbotti

= Turbott's weevil =

Species of beetle

Turbott's weevil (Anagotus turbotti) is a weevil that is endemic to New Zealand. It has been found on the Hen and Chicken Islands, the Poor Knights Islands and the Three Kings Islands.

== Taxonomy ==
New Zealand entomologist Donald Spiller first described this species in 1942, originally named as Phaeophanus turbotti. The description was based on two specimens collected by E. G. Turbott from the Poor Knights Islands in November 1940, leading the weevil to be named in honour of its collector. Turbott's weevil was recombined into the genus Anagotus in 1982 by Guillermo Kuschel.

== Description ==
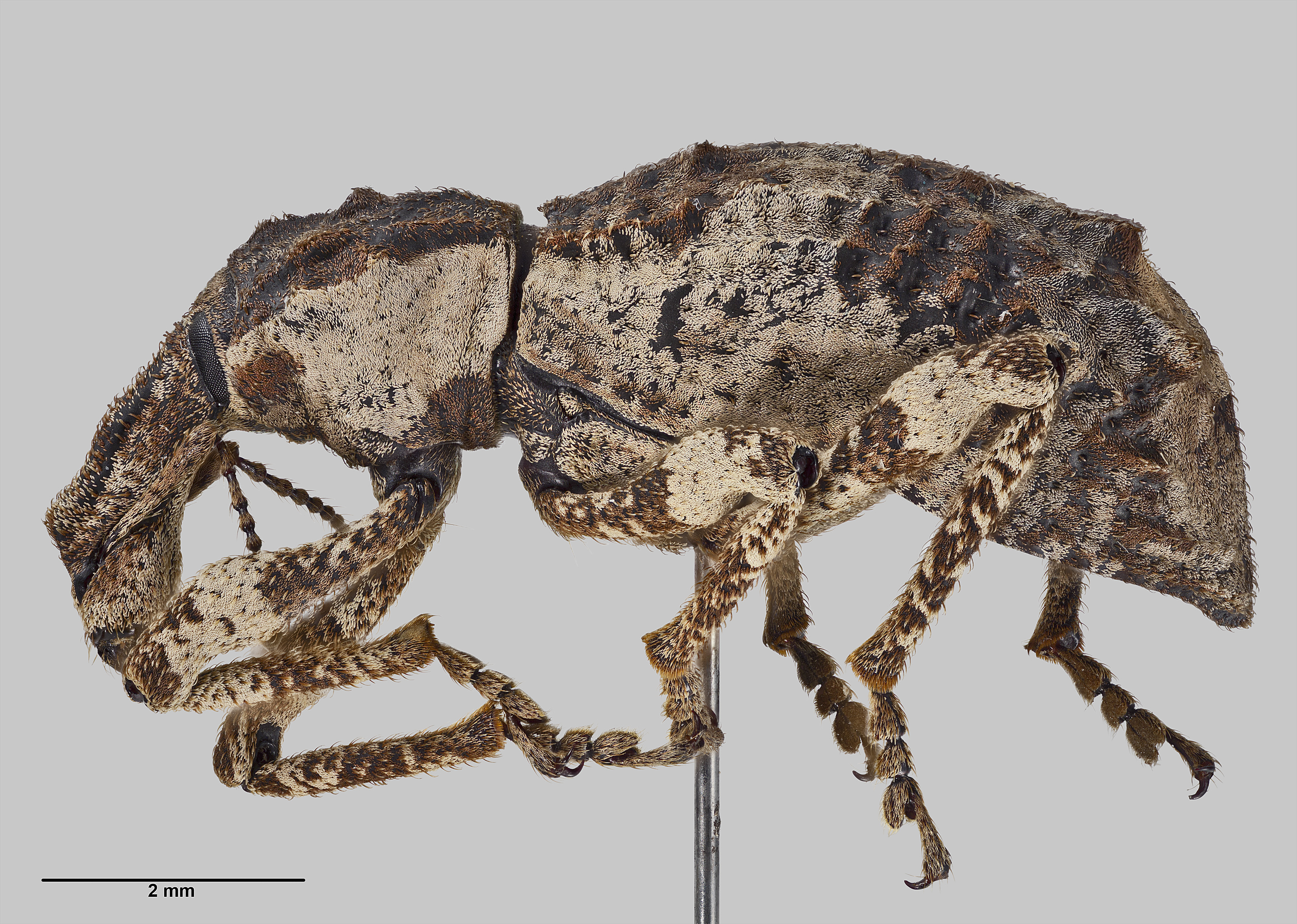
Profile view of holotype held at Auckland Museum

Turbott's weevil is one of the largest and most colourful of New Zealand's endemic weevils. This species is flightless and ranges in length from 18-25mm. It has conspicuous white markings and obvious tubercles.

== Life cycle ==
The larvae of Turbott's weevils are wood borers and have been discovered in several different tree species. However they are most commonly found in ngaio and karaka trees.

== Distribution and habitat ==
The locality from which the type specimen of this species was collected is the island of Aorangi. As well as the Poor Knights Islands, Turbott's weevil can also be found on the Three Kings Islands and on Muriwhenua of the Hen and Chicken Islands. Adult beetles have been collected from Myoporum laetum and Corynocarpus laevigatus.

== Behaviour ==
Adult weevils are active both day and night and have been observed consuming the leaves of the ngaio tree.

== Predation ==
The Turbott's weevil is prone to rat predation. This is due to it being large and slow moving. The extinction of its sister species, Anagotus stephenensis from the mainland was probably due to rat predation. The Turbott's weevil was probably more widespread historically, but is now only found on predator-free islands.

== Conservation status and efforts ==
In September 2006 the Department of Conservation translocated 30 Turbott's weevils from Muriwhenua Island to Lady Alice Island, a predator free Island also in the Hen and Chicken Islands group. This was done in the hope that they would become established on that Island. To assist with their establishment the weevils were placed inside cages situated in West Bay containing tree species the weevils are known to consume.

Turbott's weevil are protected under Schedule 7 of The 1953 Wildlife Act, making it an offense to hunt, kill or possess a specimen.
