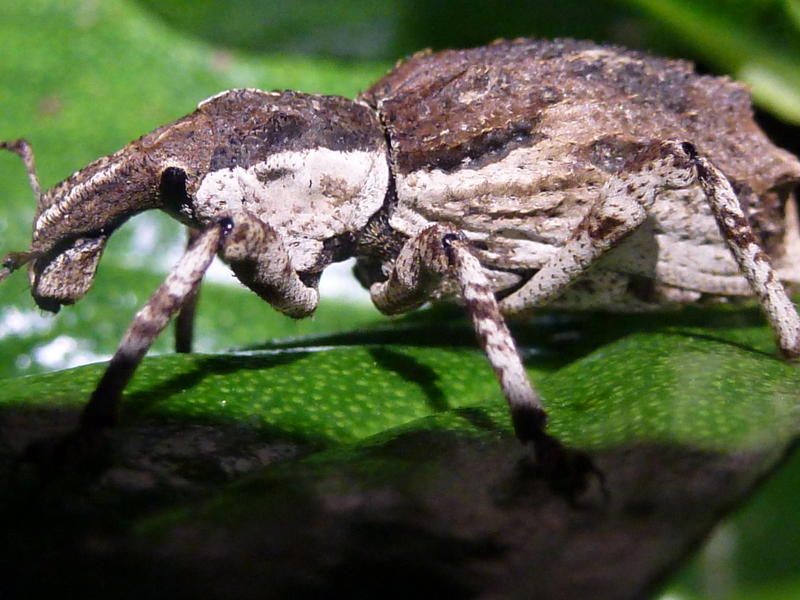
- Ngaio weevil (Anagotus stephenensis) on Stephens Island

Scientific classification
- Kingdom: Animalia
- Phylum: Arthropoda
- Clade: Pancrustacea
- Class: Insecta
- Order: Coleoptera
- Suborder: Polyphaga
- Infraorder: Cucujiformia
- Superfamily: Curculionoidea
- Family: Curculionidae
- Tribe: Aterpini
- Genus: Anagotus; Sharp, 1882

Species
- See text

= Anagotus =

Genus of beetles

Anagotus is a weevil genus in the tribe Aterpini described by Sharp 1882. Twelve species are native to New Zealand. Anagotus weevils were once widespread but are now only common on islands free of introduced rats.

== Description ==
Weevil species in the genus Anagotus are large as adults having a dark exoskeleton, covered with small hair-like coppery-brown scales. On the sides and posterior, the colouration is lighter with a prominent white streak along the centre of its thorax. They have obvious prominences on its sides and posterior.

== Biology ==
These weevils have wood-boring larvae. Each species of Anagotus weevil is associated with a different host plant: A. fairburni eats harakeke; A. stephenensis eats ngaio; A. turbotti eats karaka; A. oconnori eats Astelia. The Anagotus weevils are large, nocturnal, flightless insects ranging in length from 20 to 31mm. They are not uniformly distributed as they prefer to feed on trees with low branches that facilitate easy access from their daytime hiding spots in the leaf litter or dense grass. During the day adult weevils can be found 20-30mm deep in the leaf litter, motionless, clinging to leaves or bark. Larvae of other members of the Aterpini tribe are mostly associated with live wood, boring into stems, leaf bases and roots.

Male and female ngaio weevil can be identified on the basis of their length and mass. Female weevils are longer and heavier than the male weevils, with an average length of 27.8mm and a weight of 0.96g, and males with 24.9mm and 0.68g.

== Conservation ==
The Anagotus species are Nationally Critical due to decreasing numbers. Three species of Anagotus weevil are legally protected under Schedule 7 of the New Zealand Wildlife Act 1953. It is prohibited to collect, or harm any specimens.

== Species ==
Anagotus carinirostris - Anagotus fairburni - Anagotus graniger - Anagotus halli - Anagotus hamiltoni - Anagotus helmsi - Anagotus latirostris - Anagotus lewisi - Anagotus oconnori - A. peelensis - Anagotus rugosus - Anagotus stephenensis - Anagotus turbotti
