= Paralissotes oconnori =

Conservation status
- Nationally Endangered (NZ TCS)

Scientific classification
- Kingdom: Animalia
- Phylum: Arthropoda
- Class: Insecta
- Order: Coleoptera
- Suborder: Polyphaga
- Infraorder: Scarabaeiformia
- Family: Lucanidae
- Genus: Paralissotes
- Species: P. oconnori

Binomial name
- Paralissotes oconnori (Holloway, 1961)

Synonyms
- Lissotes oconnori Holloway, 1961

Species of beetle

Paralissotes oconnori is a species of stag beetle endemic to New Zealand.
