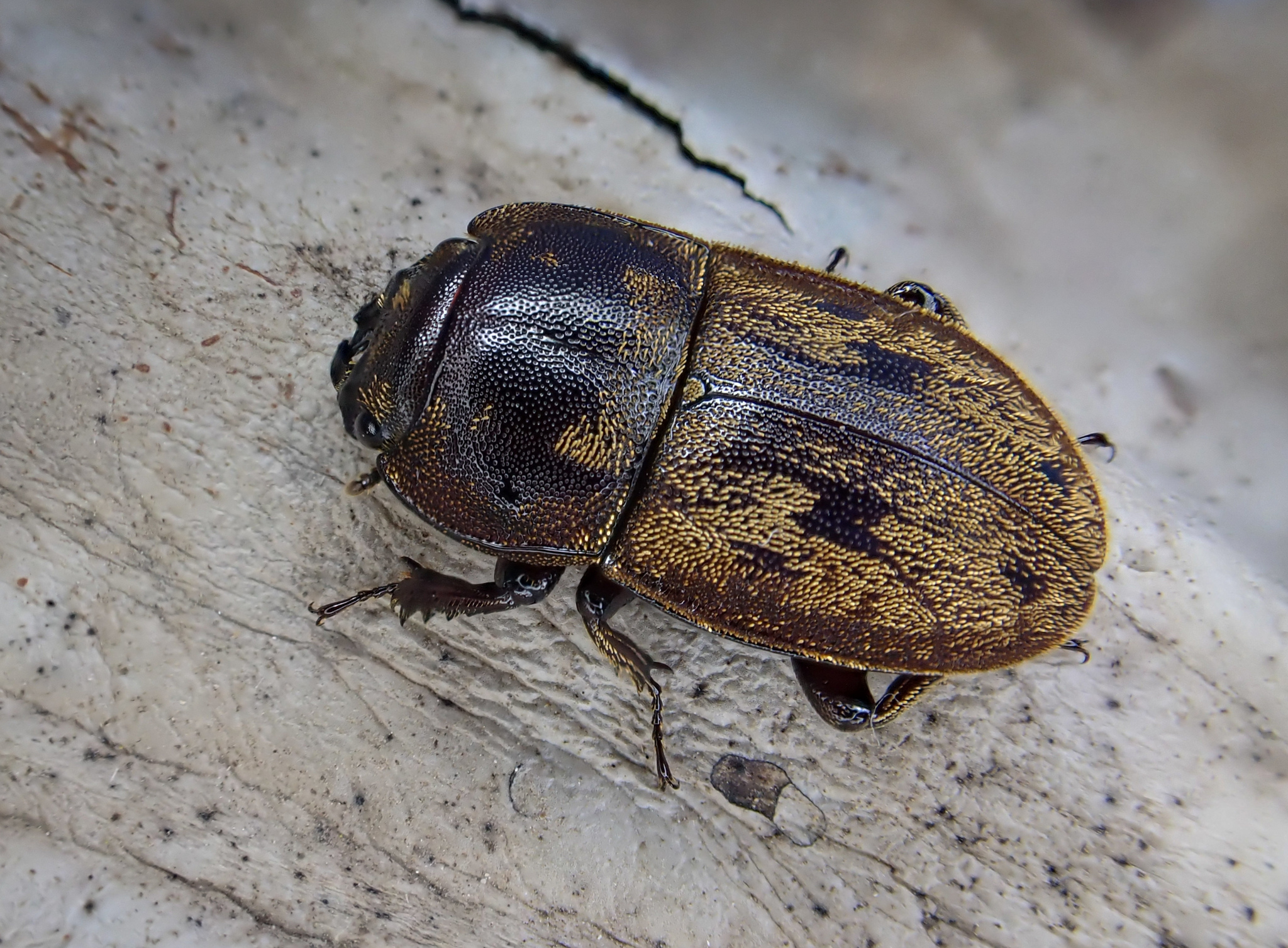

Scientific classification
- Kingdom: Animalia
- Phylum: Arthropoda
- Class: Insecta
- Order: Coleoptera
- Suborder: Polyphaga
- Infraorder: Scarabaeiformia
- Family: Lucanidae
- Genus: Paralissotes
- Species: P. planus

Binomial name
- Paralissotes planus (Broun, 1880)

Synonyms
- Dorcus planus Broun, 1880; Lissotes planus

= Paralissotes planus =

Species of beetle

Paralissotes planus is a species of stag beetle endemic to New Zealand.
