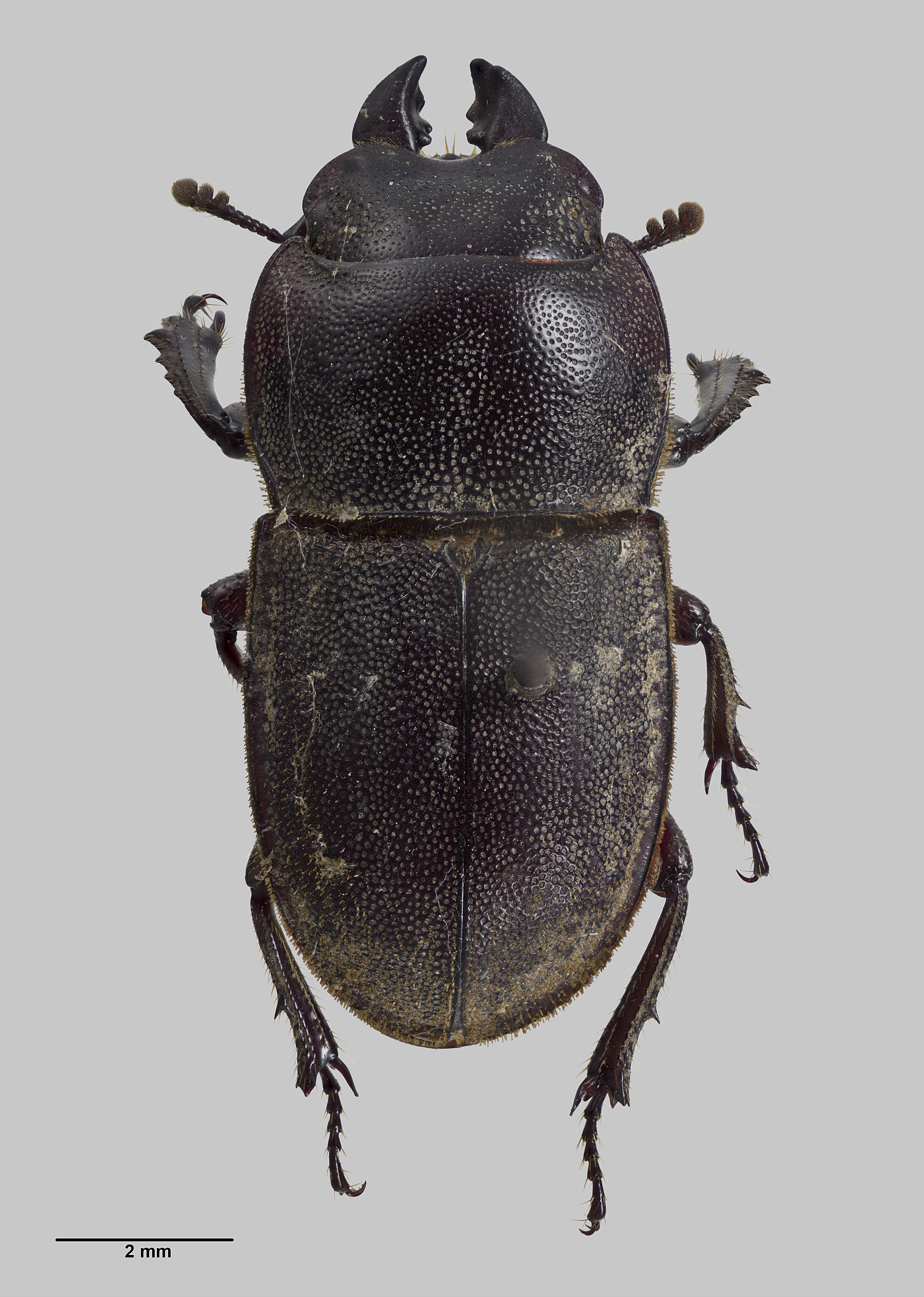

Scientific classification
- Kingdom: Animalia
- Phylum: Arthropoda
- Class: Insecta
- Order: Coleoptera
- Suborder: Polyphaga
- Infraorder: Scarabaeiformia
- Family: Lucanidae
- Genus: Paralissotes
- Species: P. triregius

Binomial name
- Paralissotes triregius (Holloway, 1963)

Synonyms
- Lissotes oconnori Holloway, 1963

= Paralissotes triregius =

Species of beetle

Paralissotes triregius is a species of stag beetle endemic to New Zealand.
