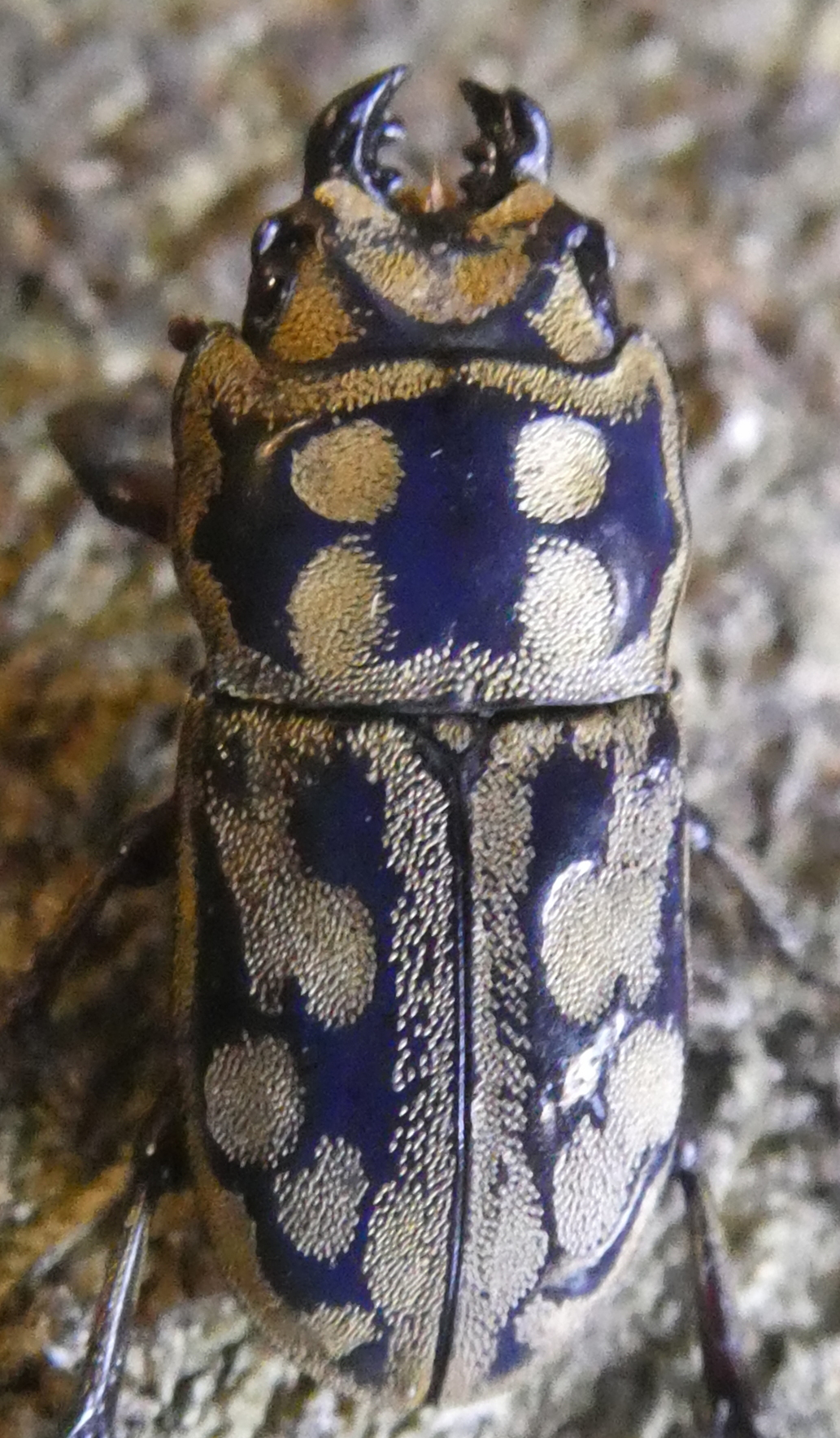

Scientific classification
- Kingdom: Animalia
- Phylum: Arthropoda
- Class: Insecta
- Order: Coleoptera
- Suborder: Polyphaga
- Infraorder: Scarabaeiformia
- Family: Lucanidae
- Genus: Paralissotes
- Species: P. rufipes

Binomial name
- Paralissotes rufipes (Sharp, 1886)

= Paralissotes rufipes =

Species of beetle

Paralissotes rufipes is a species of stag beetle endemic to New Zealand.
