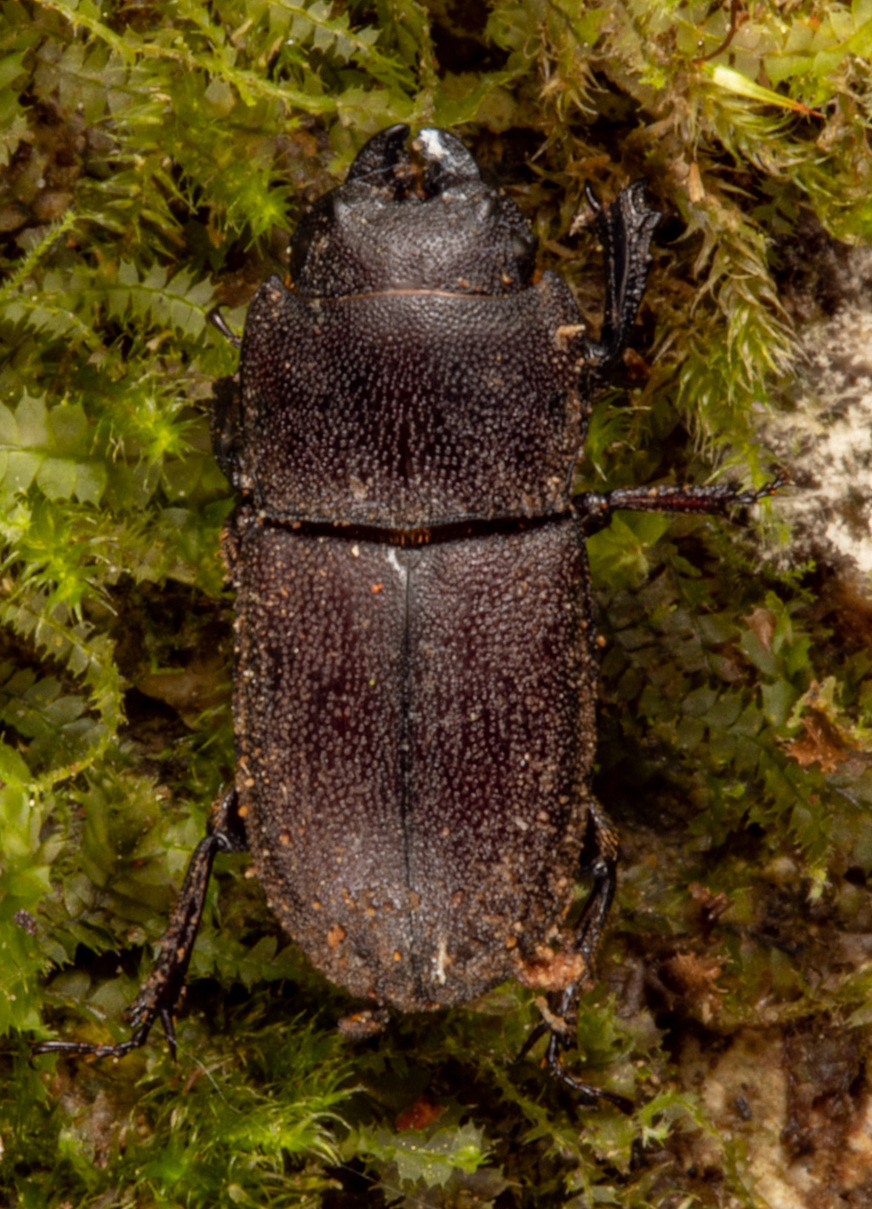

Scientific classification
- Kingdom: Animalia
- Phylum: Arthropoda
- Class: Insecta
- Order: Coleoptera
- Suborder: Polyphaga
- Infraorder: Scarabaeiformia
- Family: Lucanidae
- Genus: Paralissotes
- Species: P. stewarti

Binomial name
- Paralissotes stewarti (Broun, 1881)

Synonyms
- Dorcus stewarti Broun, 1881; Lissotes stewarti

= Paralissotes stewarti =

Species of beetle

Paralissotes stewarti is a species of stag beetle endemic to New Zealand.
