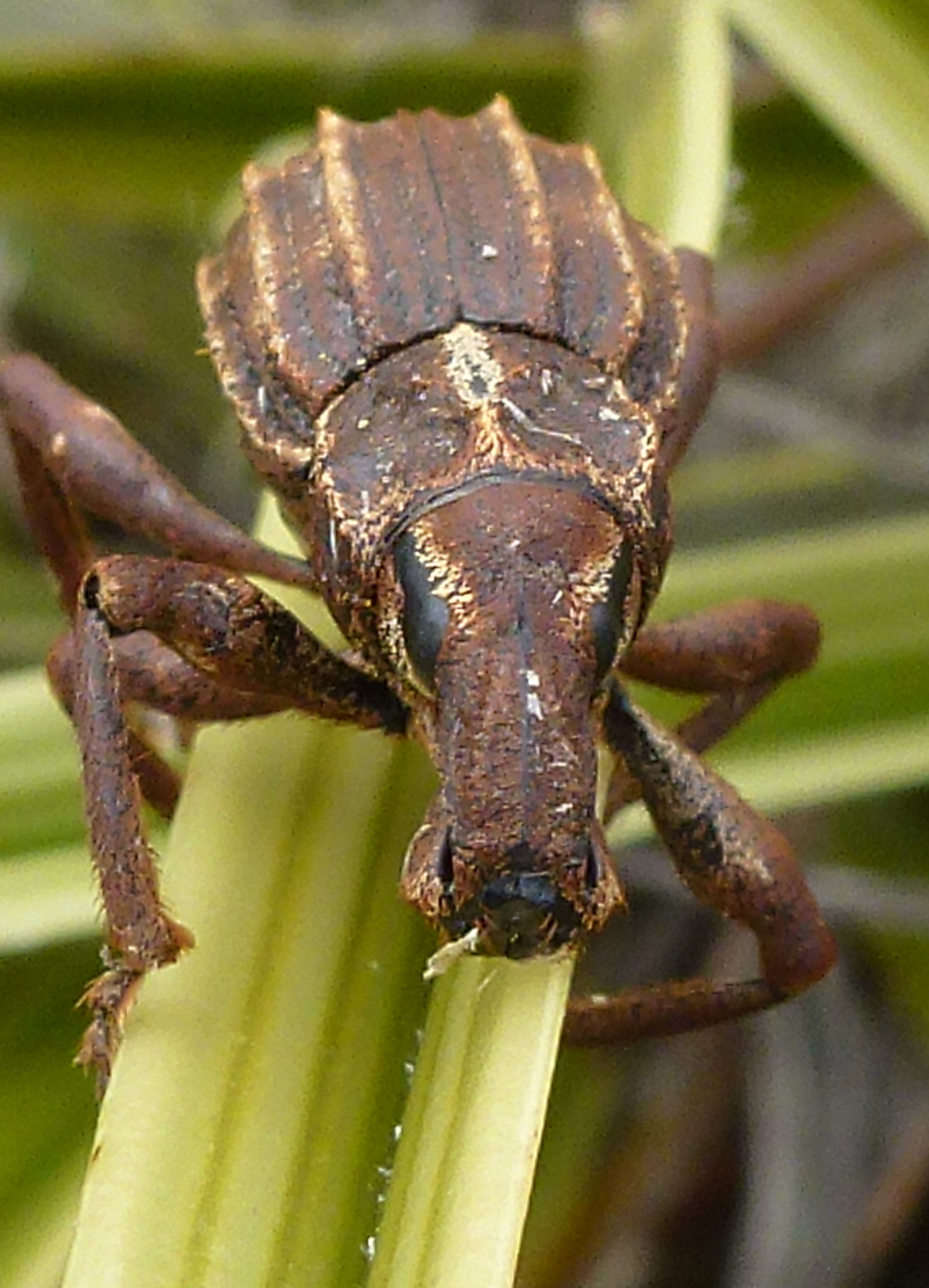

Scientific classification
- Kingdom: Animalia
- Phylum: Arthropoda
- Class: Insecta
- Order: Coleoptera
- Suborder: Polyphaga
- Infraorder: Cucujiformia
- Family: Curculionidae
- Genus: Anagotus
- Species: A. oconnori

Binomial name
- Anagotus oconnori (Broun, 1910)

Synonyms
- Phaedropholus oconnori Broun, 1910

= Anagotus oconnori =

Astelia weevil

Species of beetle

Anagotus oconnori or Astelia weevil is a large flightless weevil found in New Zealand. It was first collected on Mount Quoin in Wellington from Astelia by Mr A.C. O'Connor after whom this species was named.

== Description ==
This weevil is reddish-brown with shining black areas on the mandibles, elytra, thorax and end of the rostrum. It has paler colouration on the sides and posterior of the elytra.

== Distribution ==
The astelia weevil is found in alpine areas in both the North Island and South Island of New Zealand. These include the Tararua Range on the North Island and Mount Arthur on the South Island. They have also been found to be abundant on Astelia nivicola in northwest Nelson.
