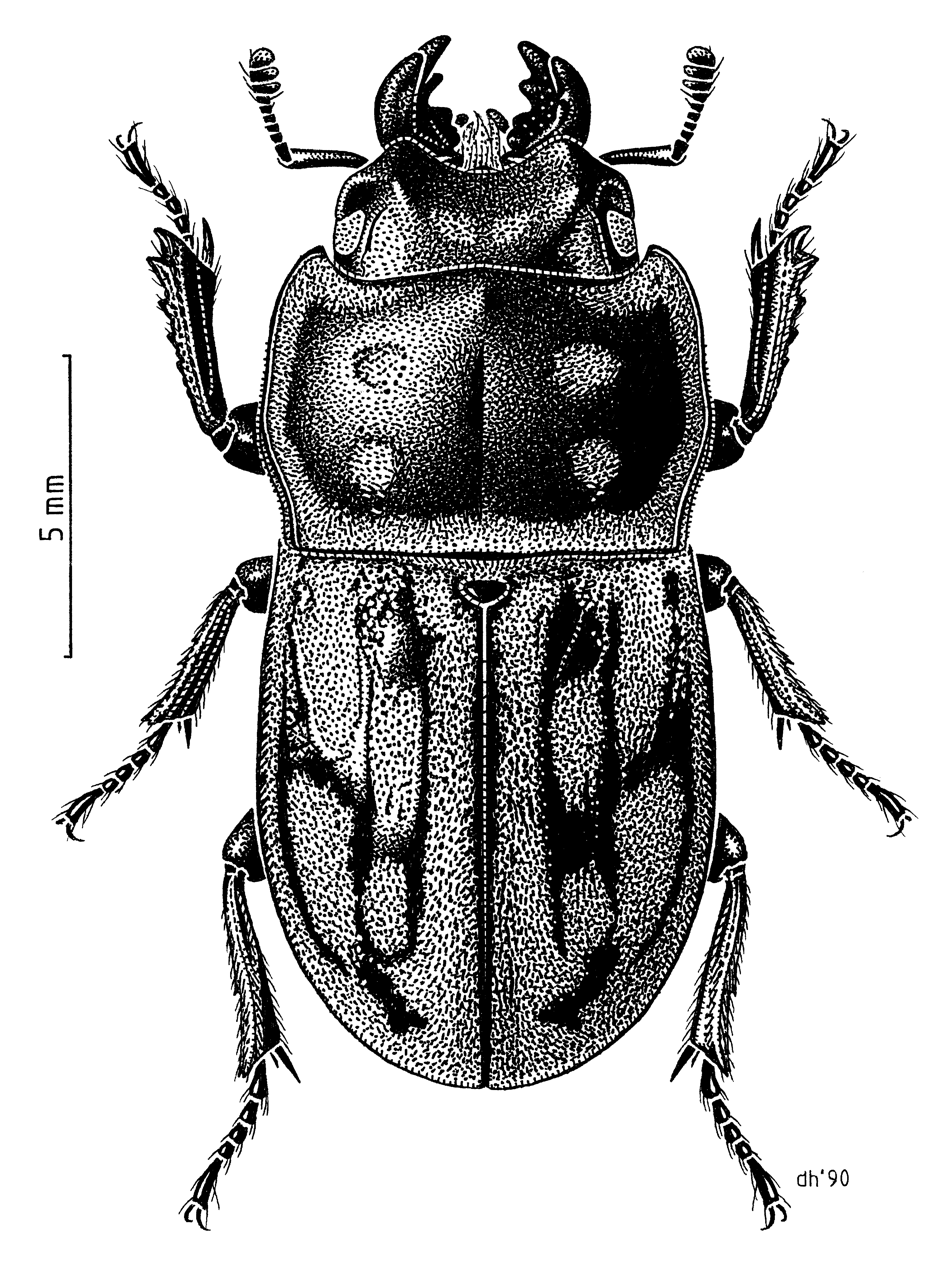
- Paralissotes reticulatus

Scientific classification
- Kingdom: Animalia
- Phylum: Arthropoda
- Class: Insecta
- Order: Coleoptera
- Suborder: Polyphaga
- Infraorder: Scarabaeiformia
- Family: Lucanidae
- Subfamily: Lucaninae
- Tribe: Lissapterini
- Genus: Paralissotes; Holloway, 1996

= Paralissotes =

Genus of beetles

Paralissotes is a genus of stag beetle that is endemic to New Zealand.

== Taxonomy ==
Paralissotes was described in 1996 by Beverly Holloway. New Zealand species previously placed in the Australian Lissotes genus were transferred to Paralissotes due to notable differences in the form of the elytral scales. Paralissotes reticulatus is the type species for this genus.

== Etymology ==
The name Paralissotes refers to how similar the genus is to Lissotes, "para" means close/near whilst "lissotes" refers to the Lissotes genus.

== Distribution ==
This genus is distributed from Three Kings Islands to as far south as Waimate in the South Island at altitudes below 1000m. These stag beetles are absent from the Chatham Islands.

== Species ==
There are seven currently accepted Paralissotes species:

- Paralissotes mangonuiensis (Brookes, 1927)
- Paralissotes oconnori (Holloway, 1961)
- Paralissotes planus (Broun, 1880)
- Paralissotes reticulatus (Westwood, 1844)
- Paralissotes rufipes (Sharp, 1886)
- Paralissotes stewarti (Broun, 1881)
- Paralissotes triregius (Holloway, 1963)
