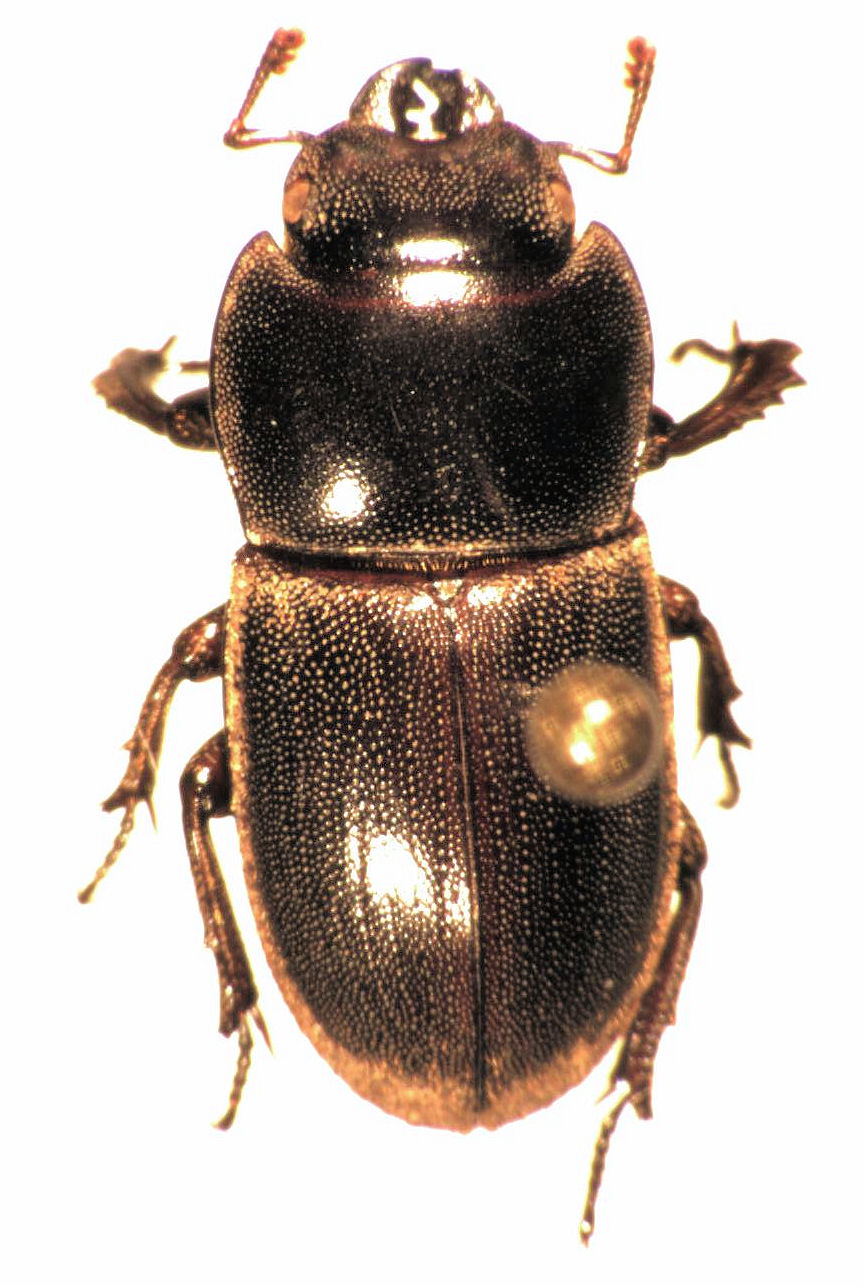

Conservation status
- Naturally Uncommon (NZ TCS)

Scientific classification
- Kingdom: Animalia
- Phylum: Arthropoda
- Class: Insecta
- Order: Coleoptera
- Suborder: Polyphaga
- Infraorder: Scarabaeiformia
- Family: Lucanidae
- Genus: Paralissotes
- Species: P. mangonuiensis

Binomial name
- Paralissotes mangonuiensis (Brookes, 1927)

Synonyms
- Lissotes mangonuiensis Brookes, 1927

= Paralissotes mangonuiensis =

Species of beetle

Paralissotes mangonuiensis is a species of stag beetle endemic to New Zealand.
