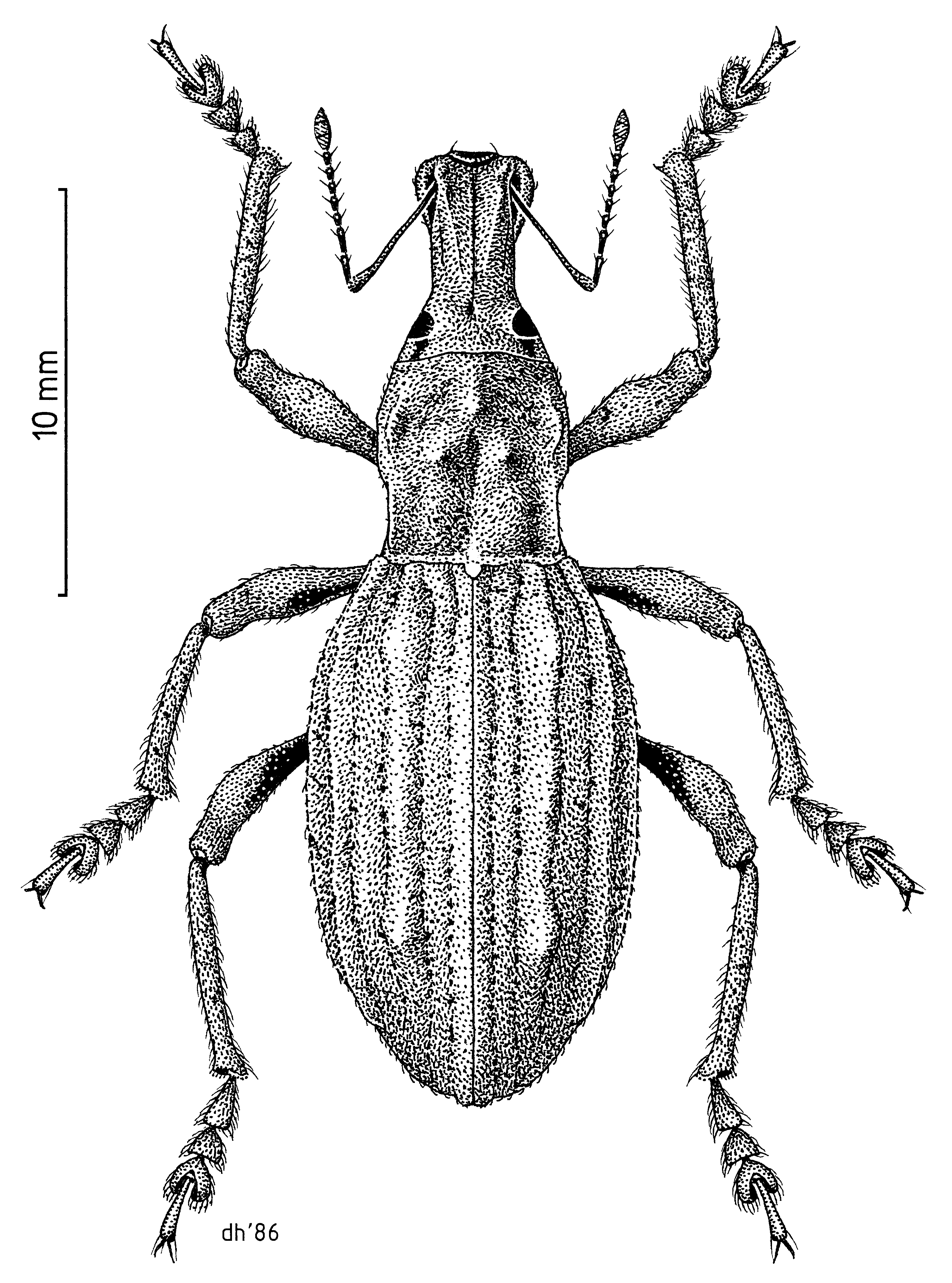
- Illustration by Des Helmore

Scientific classification
- Kingdom: Animalia
- Phylum: Arthropoda
- Clade: Pancrustacea
- Class: Insecta
- Order: Coleoptera
- Suborder: Polyphaga
- Infraorder: Cucujiformia
- Superfamily: Curculionoidea
- Family: Curculionidae
- Genus: Anagotus
- Species: A. fairburni

Binomial name
- Anagotus fairburni Brookes, 1932 Range of Anagotus fairburni in New Zealand

= Flax weevil =

Species of weevil endemic to New Zealand

Anagotus fairburni or Flax weevil is a large flightless weevil. It feeds on leaves of New Zealand flax species where it produces a characteristic feeding notch. It is found on islands and in alpine areas of New Zealand.

== Taxonomy and description ==
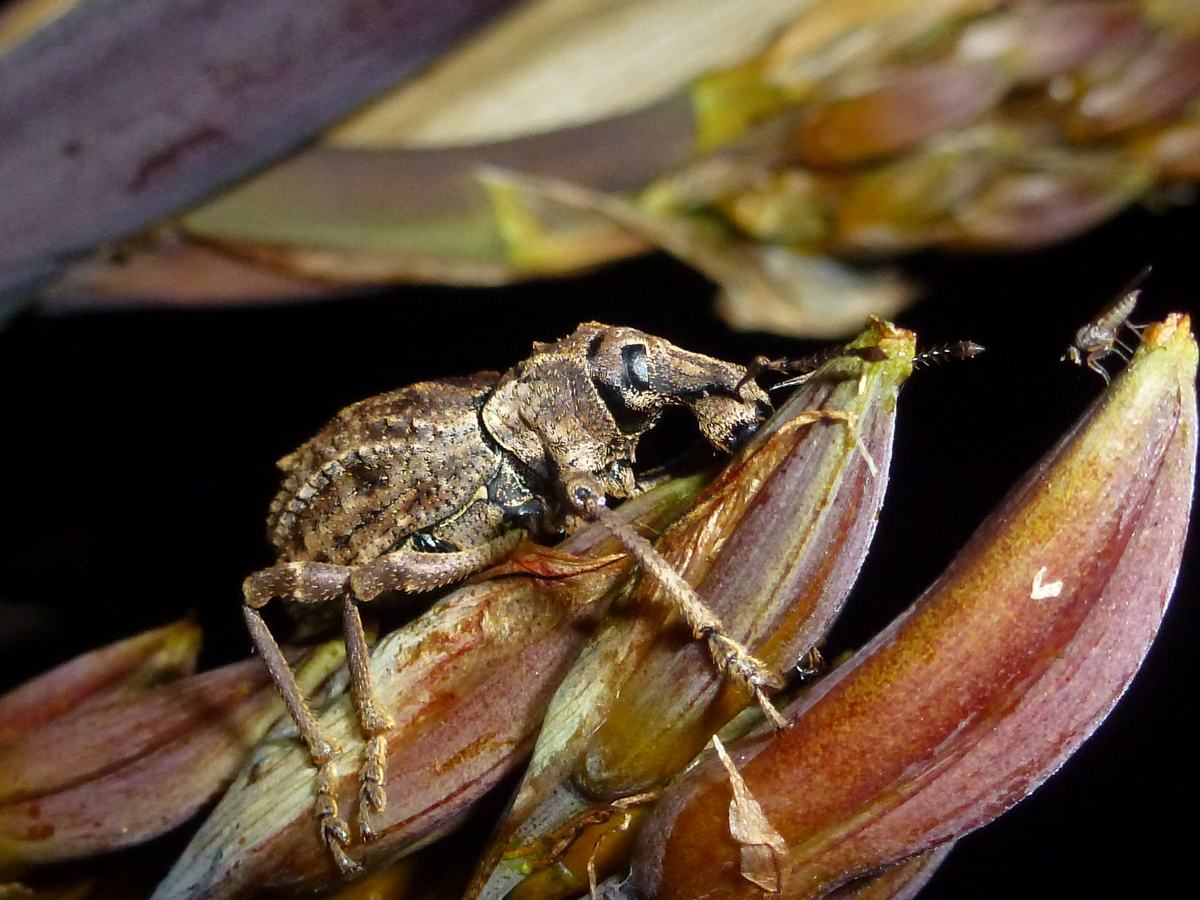
Flax weevil browsing on a flax flower

The flax weevil was described by Albert E. Brookes in 1932 based on a series of specimens sent to him by Ernest Richard Fairburn. These were collected at its type locality of D'Urville Island in the Marlborough Sounds in 1931. The type specimen is held at the New Zealand Arthropod Collection. It was described as large and robust in form and ranging in size from 20–24mm. Specimens can range in colour from coppery-brown to dark brown, or even black in older weevils that have lost their scales. They have distinctive pairs of tubercles mid-way along and at the base of the elytra. Larvae are large with a cream coloured body and brown head. The adult is flightless.

== Distribution and habitat ==
This species is distributed across a wide range. It can be located from the Three Kings Islands, north of the North Island of New Zealand, to Coal Island in Fiordland off the southern coast of the South Island. Between these locations are numerous populations on islands in the Marlborough Sounds. On islands, it is usually found on New Zealand flax/harakeke (Phormium tenax). It is restricted to rodent-free islands and alpine areas. In the Tararua Range and on islands in Dusky Sound it lives on mountain flax/wharariki (Phormium colensoi). All life cycle stages are found on or near flax.

== Behaviour and host species ==
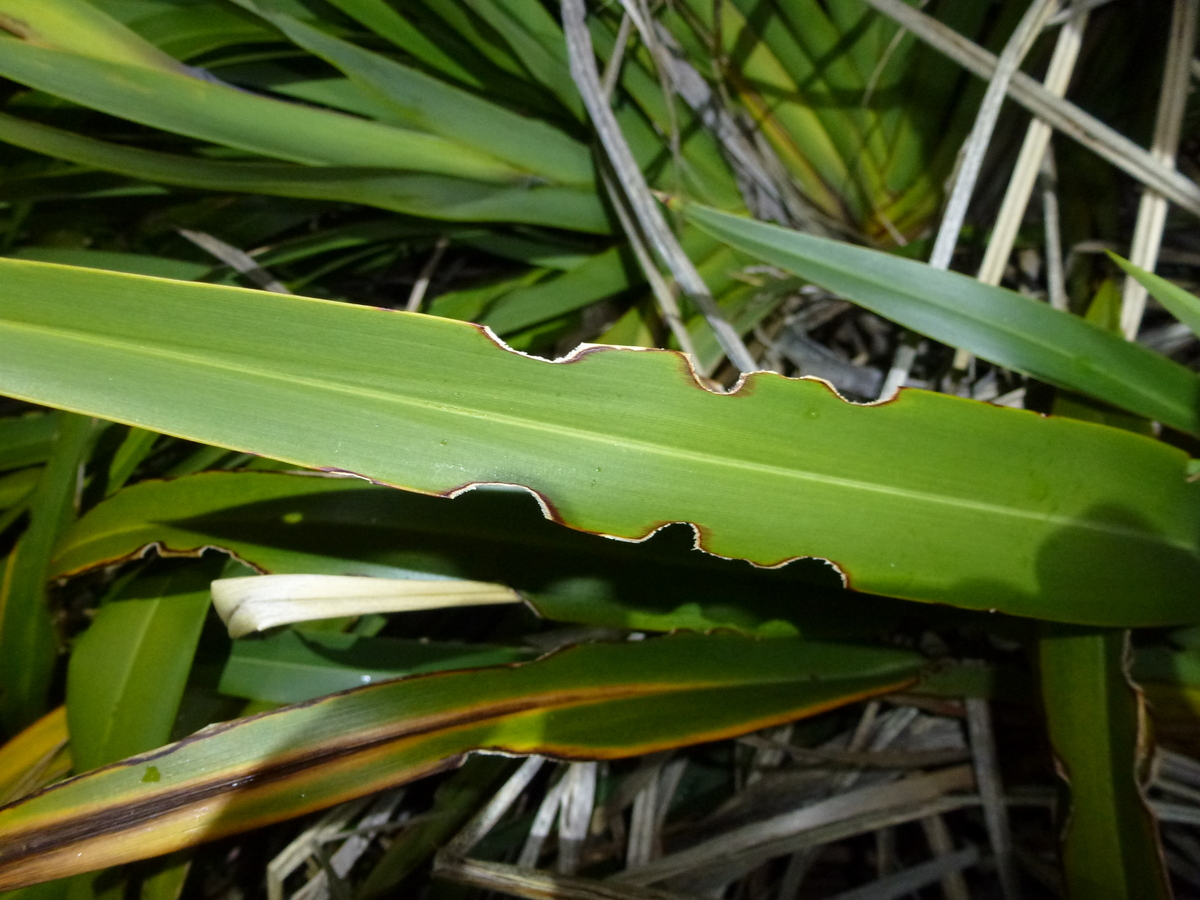
Flax weevil notches on flax leaves

Adults are nocturnal and hide among the dead flax leaves at the base of a plant during the day, emerging at night to feed. Their feeding damage is smooth ovoid notching of the leaf edges; the asymmetrical notches are fibrous and rough, unlike the smooth notches left by the flax notch caterpillar Tmetolophota steropastis. Eggs are deposited at the bases of leaves. Larvae feed by burrowing into flax roots. If disturbed at night, flax weevils characteristically drop from flax leaves onto the ground or stay motionless on leaves.

== Life cycle ==
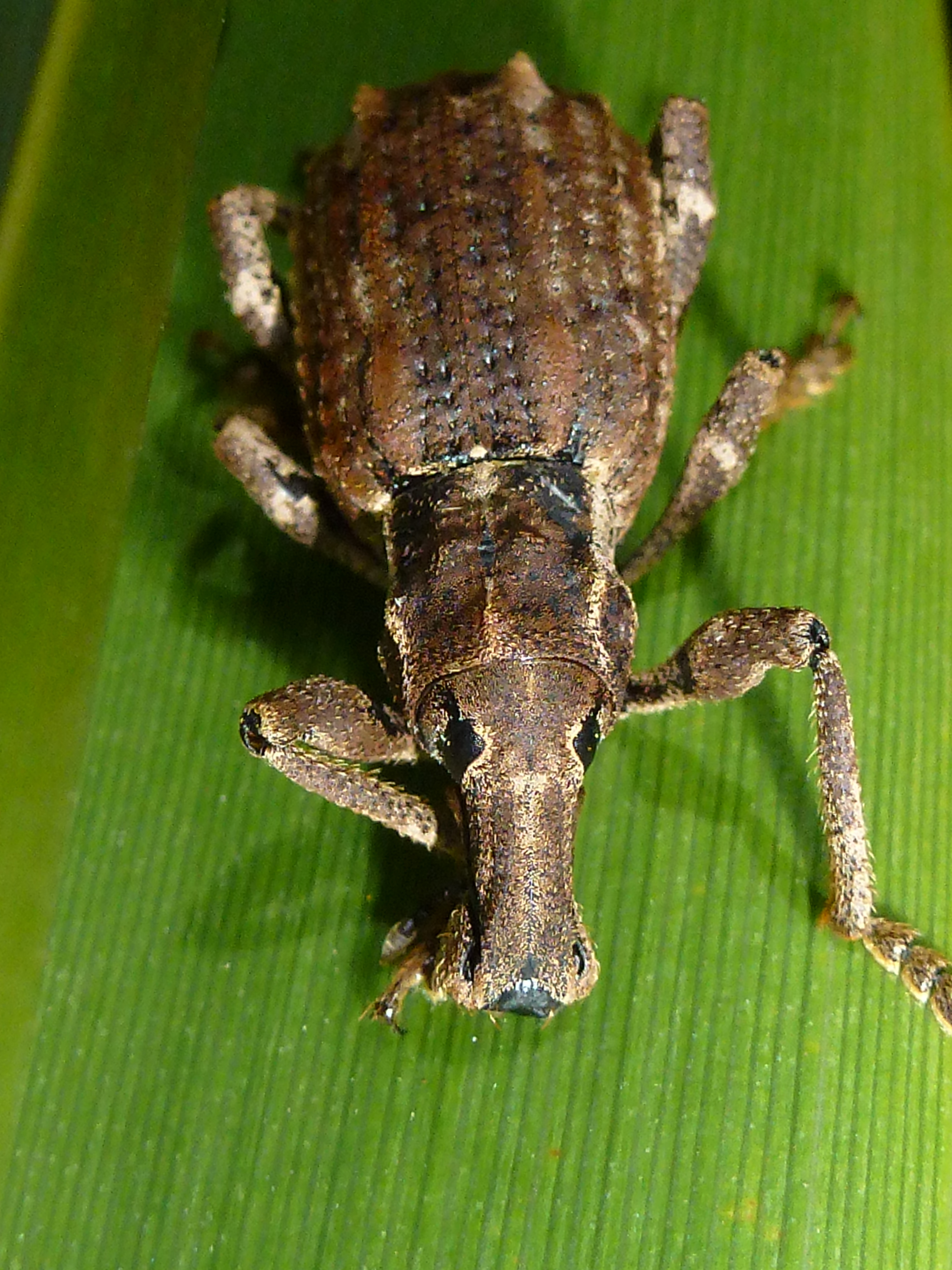
Flax weevil on Te Pākeka/Maud Island

White eggs are laid at the base of flax plants. These eggs can take from 3 to 5 weeks to develop into larvae. They gradually darken to a black colour prior to the larvae emerging. The yellow larvae move towards the fan of leaves near the plant base, where they tunnel into the soft tissue within. The timing of the larval or pupal stages are unknown. Adult flax weevils have lived for over 12 months in captivity.

== Conservation and threats ==
The flax weevil is legally protected under Schedule 7 of the 1953 Wildlife Act, making it an offence to collect, possess or harm a specimen. Predation by rats and mice has caused a restriction of their range to predator-free islands and alpine areas; historically, their range was throughout New Zealand. Translocations have occurred to islands, once rodents have been removed. These include Breaksea Island in Fiordland, Titi Island in the Marlborough Sounds, and Mana Island off the south-west coast of the North Island.

== Research ==
Damage to flax plants is usually minimal, but on Mana Island the translocated population has caused the collapse and death of flax plants around the release site. The flax plants on Mana Island are being studied to see if they are more susceptible to flax weevil browsing, with field trials of flax plantings from different sources. The absence of the fungus Beauveria was suggested as a reason for the lack of bio-control of flax weevils on Mana, but this entomopathogenic fungus turns out to be already present on the island.
