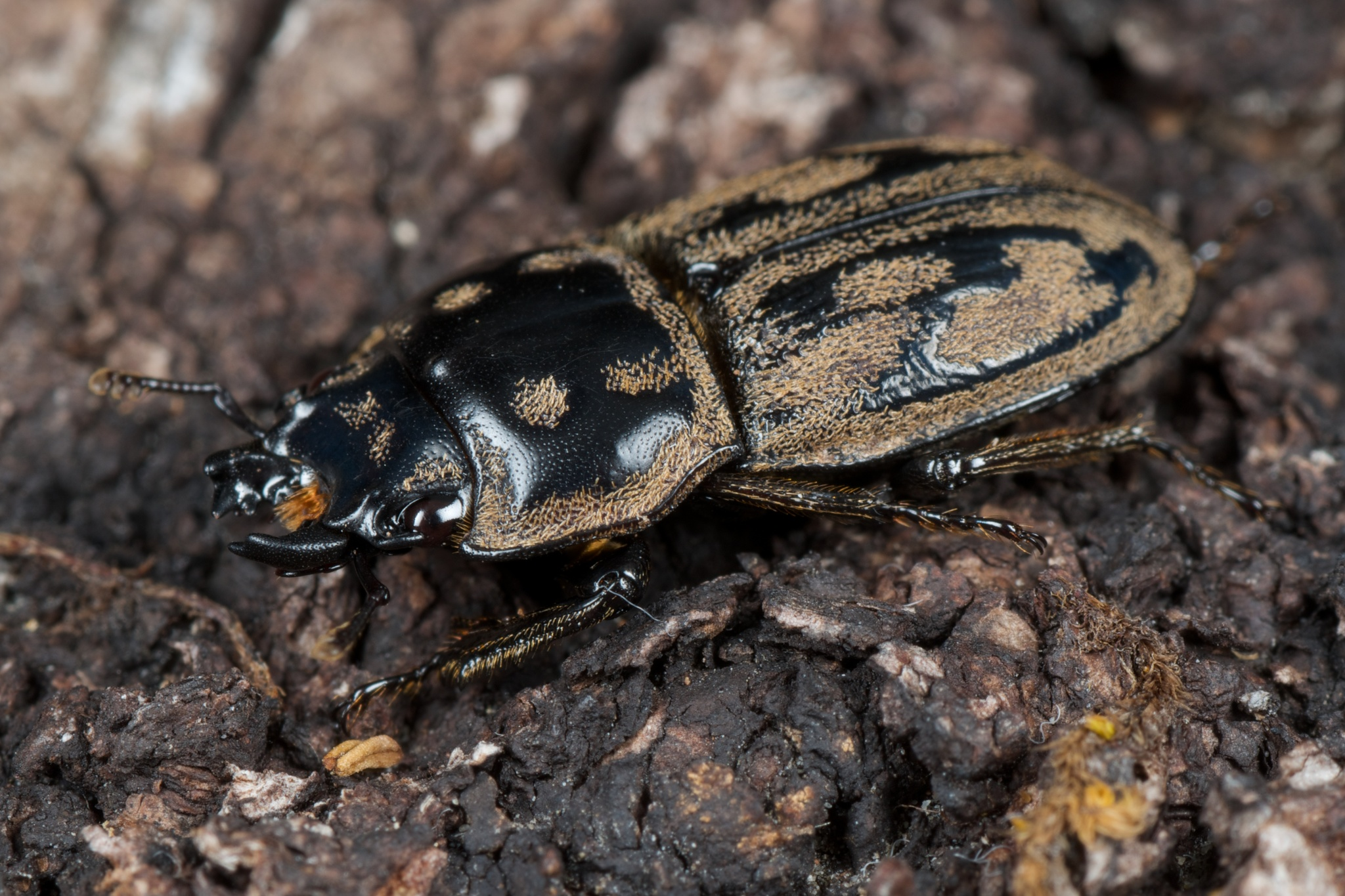

Scientific classification
- Kingdom: Animalia
- Phylum: Arthropoda
- Class: Insecta
- Order: Coleoptera
- Suborder: Polyphaga
- Infraorder: Scarabaeiformia
- Family: Lucanidae
- Subfamily: Lucaninae
- Tribe: Lissapterini
- Genus: Paralissotes
- Species: P. reticulatus

Binomial name
- Paralissotes reticulatus (Westwood, 1844)

Synonyms
- Synonymy: Aegus cicatricosus Burmeister, 1847; Dorcus squamidorsis White, 1846; Lucanus zelandicus Blanchard, 1846; Aegus cicatricosis Burmeister, 1847; Lucanus reticulatus Westwood, 1844; Lissotes reticulatus Westwood, 1844

= Paralissotes reticulatus =

Species of beetle

Paralissotes reticulatus, also called the New Zealand reticulate stag beetle, is a native species of stag beetle from New Zealand. Although they do have wings they are flightless.

== Taxonomy ==
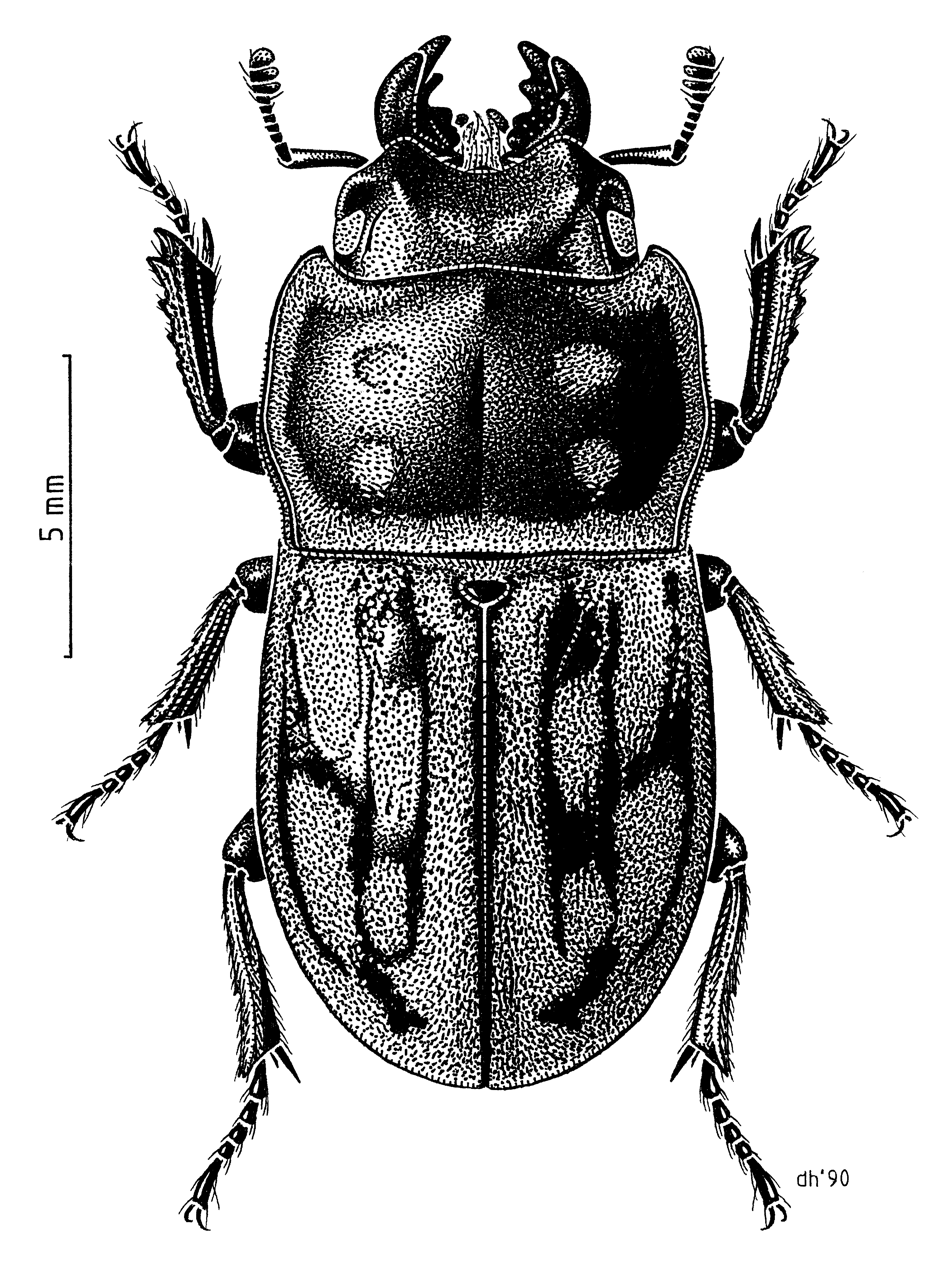
Illustration by Des Helmore

This species was first described by John O. Westwood in 1844 under the name Lucanus reticulatus. It was placed in the Paralissotes genus in 1995.

== Description ==
Including mandibles, male beetles have a length of 12.7–21.8 mm (0.50–0.86 in); female beetles from 13.8 to 21.3 mm. The beetle ranges from small to medium-sized with a glossy black exoskeleton. The reticulate name has its origin in the reticulate pattern of depressed scaly areas and non-scaly areas. Its head is widest in front of the eyes. Male and female beetles have similar sized mandibles. Like other Paralissotes species, this beetle is flightless despite having vestigial wings.

== Distribution ==
Paralissotes reticulatus is the most widespread species in its genus, having been collected from the Bay of Plenty to South Canterbury. There have been recent collections of this species near Dunedin. It is found from near sea level to an altitude of about 950 m (3,120 ft).

== Ecology ==
Like other stag beetles, adult Paralissotes reticulatus has been collected from underneath the decaying logs of native trees. The larvae are found inside rotting wood in an advanced state of decay. Like other Paralissotes species, this beetle is mostly seen at night, but may be seen during the day during wet conditions.
