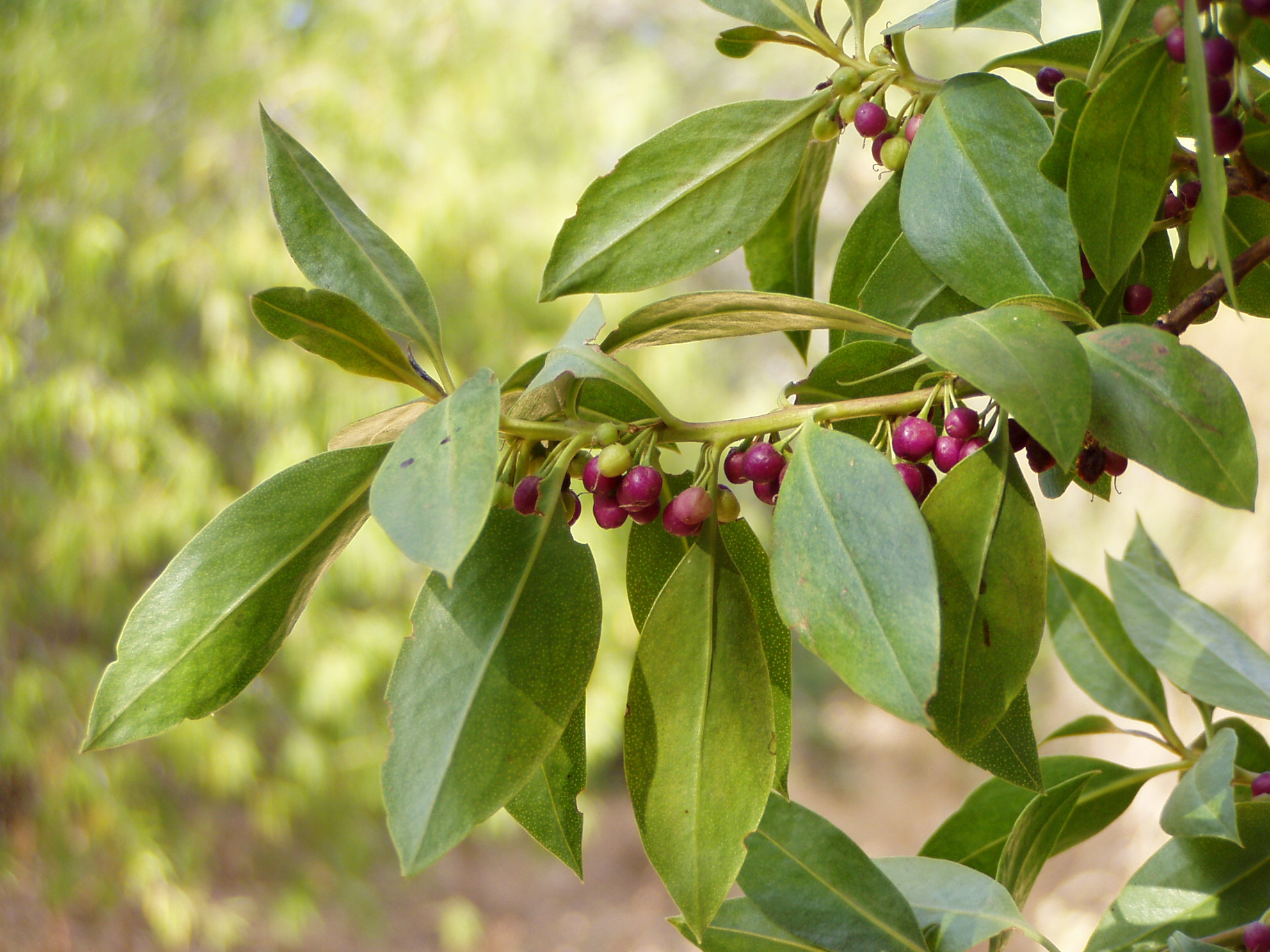
- Leaves and fruit

Scientific classification
- Kingdom: Plantae
- Clade: Embryophytes
- Clade: Tracheophytes
- Clade: Spermatophytes
- Clade: Angiosperms
- Clade: Eudicots
- Clade: Asterids
- Order: Lamiales
- Family: Scrophulariaceae
- Genus: Myoporum
- Species: M. laetum

Binomial name
- Myoporum laetum G. Forst.

Synonyms
- Myoporum crystallinum Kunze; Myoporum perforatum Voss pro syn.; Myoporum pubescens G.Forst.

= Myoporum laetum =

Species of plant endemic to New Zealand

Myoporum laetum, commonly known as ngaio (/ˈnaɪoʊ/ NY-oh, Māori: [ˈŋaio]) or mousehole tree, is a species of flowering plant in the family Scrophulariaceae and is endemic to New Zealand. It is a fast growing shrub or small tree with lance-shaped leaves, the edges with small serrations, and white flowers with small purple spots and 4 stamens.

== Description ==
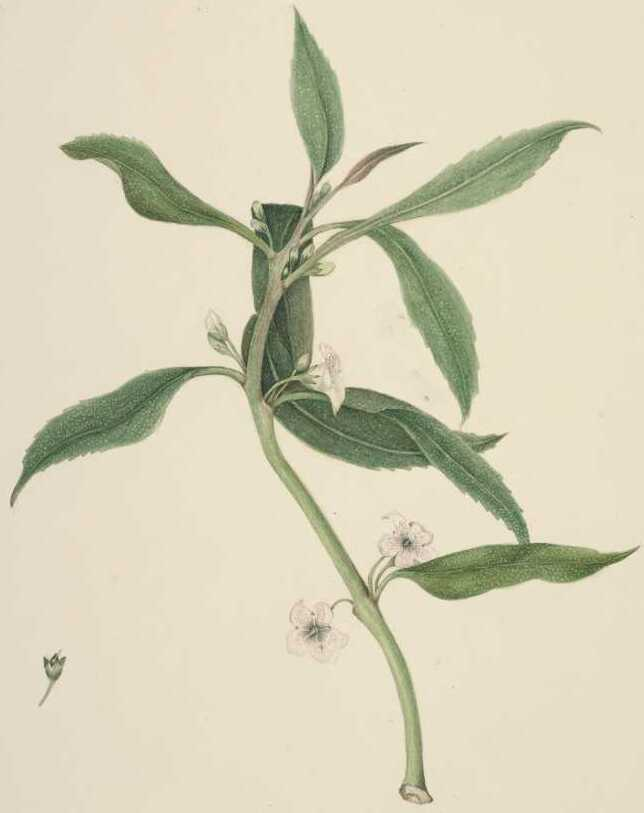
Botanical illustration by Martha King (1842)

Ngaio is a fast-growing evergreen shrub or small tree that sometimes grows to a height of 10 metres (30 ft) with a trunk up to 0.3 metres (1 ft) in diameter, or spreads to as much as 4 metres (10 ft). It often appears dome-shaped at first but as it gets older, distorts as branches break off. The bark on older specimens is thick, corky and furrowed. The leaves are lance-shaped, usually 52–125 millimetres (2–5 in) long, 15–30 millimetres (0.6–1 in) wide, have many translucent dots in the leaves and edges that have small serrations in approximately the outer half.

The flowers are white with purple spots and are borne in groups of 2 to 6 on stalks 7–15 millimetres (0.3–0.6 in) long. There are 5 egg-shaped, pointed sepals and 5 petals joined at their bases to form a bell-shaped tube 3.5–4.5 millimetres (0.1–0.2 in) long. The petal lobes are 4.5–5.5 millimetres (0.18–0.22 in) long making the flower diameter 15–20 millimetres (0.6–0.8 in). There are four stamens that extend slightly beyond the petal tube and the ovary is superior with 2 locules. Flowering occurs from mid-spring to mid-summer and is followed by the fruit which is a bright red drupe 6–9 millimetres (0.2–0.4 in) long.

== Taxonomy and naming ==
Myoporum laetum was first formally described in 1786 by Georg Forster in Florulae Insularum Australium Prodromus. The specific epithet (laetum) means "cheerful, pleasant or bright". The Māori language name ngaio has cognates in many other Polynesian languages, where the word is used to describe other members of the genus Myoporum.

== Distribution and habitat ==
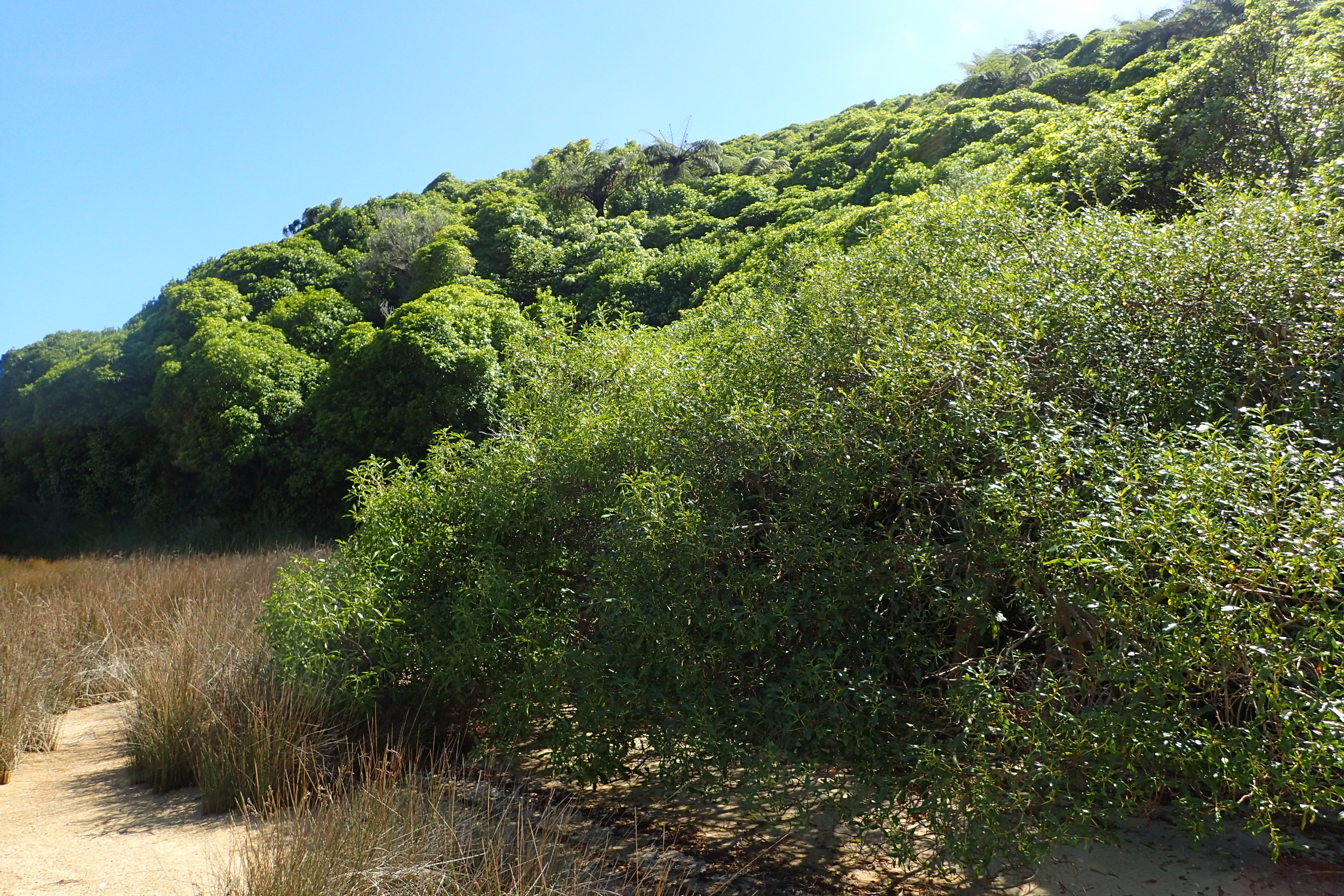
Ngaio growing in a coastal area at Wainui Bay, Tasman Region

Ngaio grows very well in coastal areas of New Zealand including on the Chatham Islands. It grows in lowland forest, sometimes in pure stands, others in association with other species such as nīkau (Rhopalostylis sapida).

== Ecology ==
Myoporum laetum has been introduced to several other countries including Portugal, South Africa and Namibia. It is considered an invasive exotic species by the California Exotic Pest Plant Council.

== Uses ==
=== Indigenous use ===
The Māori would rub the leaves over their skin to repel mosquitoes and sandflies. The leaf buds and inner bark also have uses in traditional rongoā medicinal practices, intended to soothe stomach pain or sore gums, and the berries were occasionally a traditional food source, however due to the presence of the toxin ngaione, consumption is not recommended.

=== Early European uses ===
Early European settlers to New Zealand used ngaio oil as a sheep dip, to protect sheep from parasites.

=== Horticulture ===
Ngaio is a hardy plant that will grow in most soils but needs full sun. It can also tolerate exposure to salt spray. It can be grown from seed or from semi-hard cuttings.

== Toxicity ==
The leaves of this tree contain the liver toxin ngaione, which can cause sickness and or death in stock such as horses, cattle, sheep and pigs.

== Māori legend ==
According to Māori legend, a ngaio tree can be seen on the Moon. Here is the story, as recounted by politician, historian, poet William Pember Reeves (1857–1932):

The man in the moon becomes, in Māori legend, a woman, one Rona by name. This lady, it seems, once had occasion to go by night for water to a stream. In her hand she carried an empty calabash. Stumbling in the dark over stones and the roots of trees she hurt her shoeless feet and began to abuse the moon, then hidden behind clouds, hurling at it some such epithet as "You old tattooed face, there!" But the moon-goddess heard, and reaching down caught up the insulting Rona, calabash and all, into the sky. In vain the frightened woman clutched, as she rose, the tops of a ngaio-tree. The roots gave way, and Rona with her calabash and her tree are placed in the front of the moon for ever, an awful warning to all who are tempted to mock at divinities in their haste.

== Gallery ==
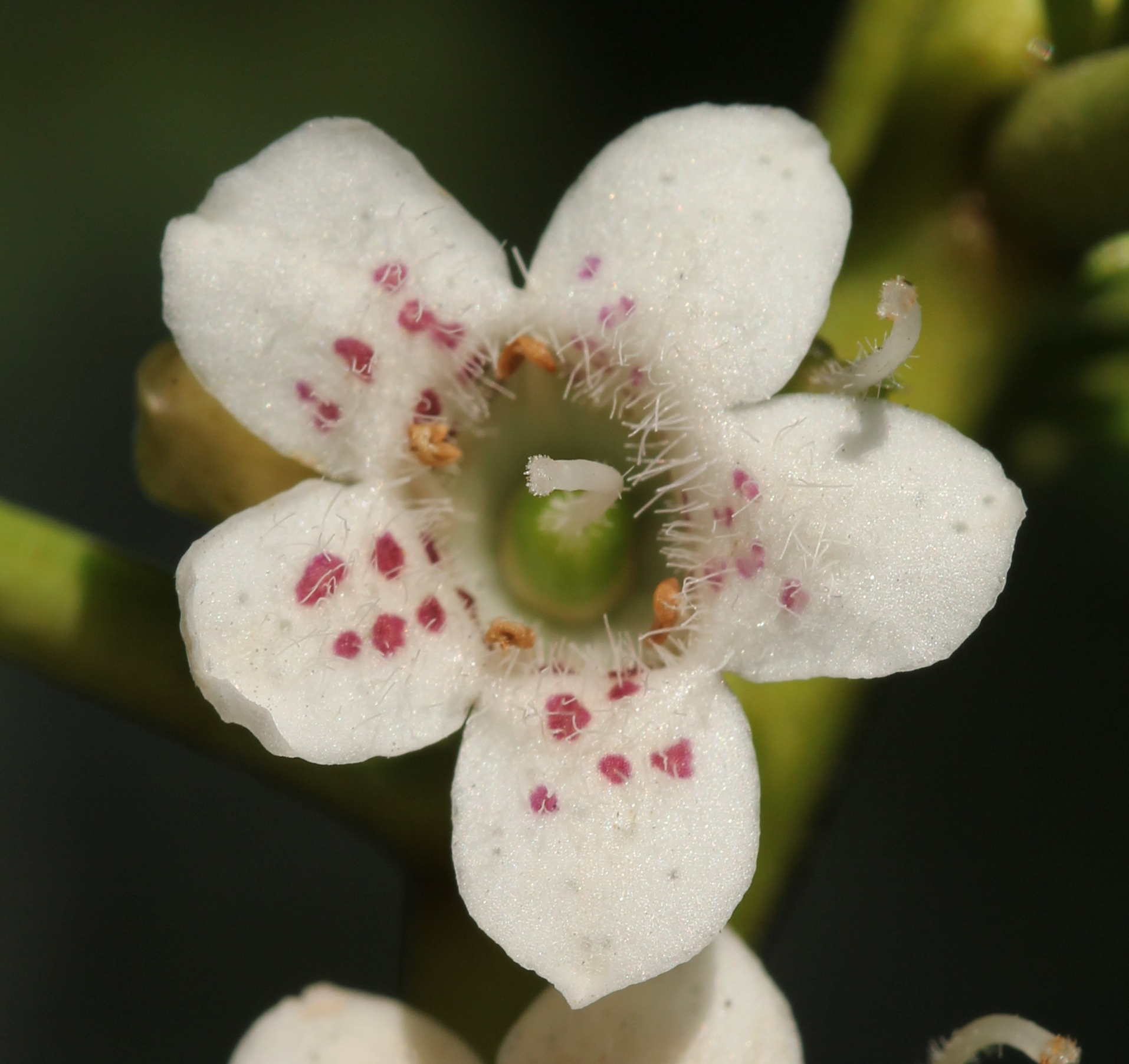
Flower of Ngaio

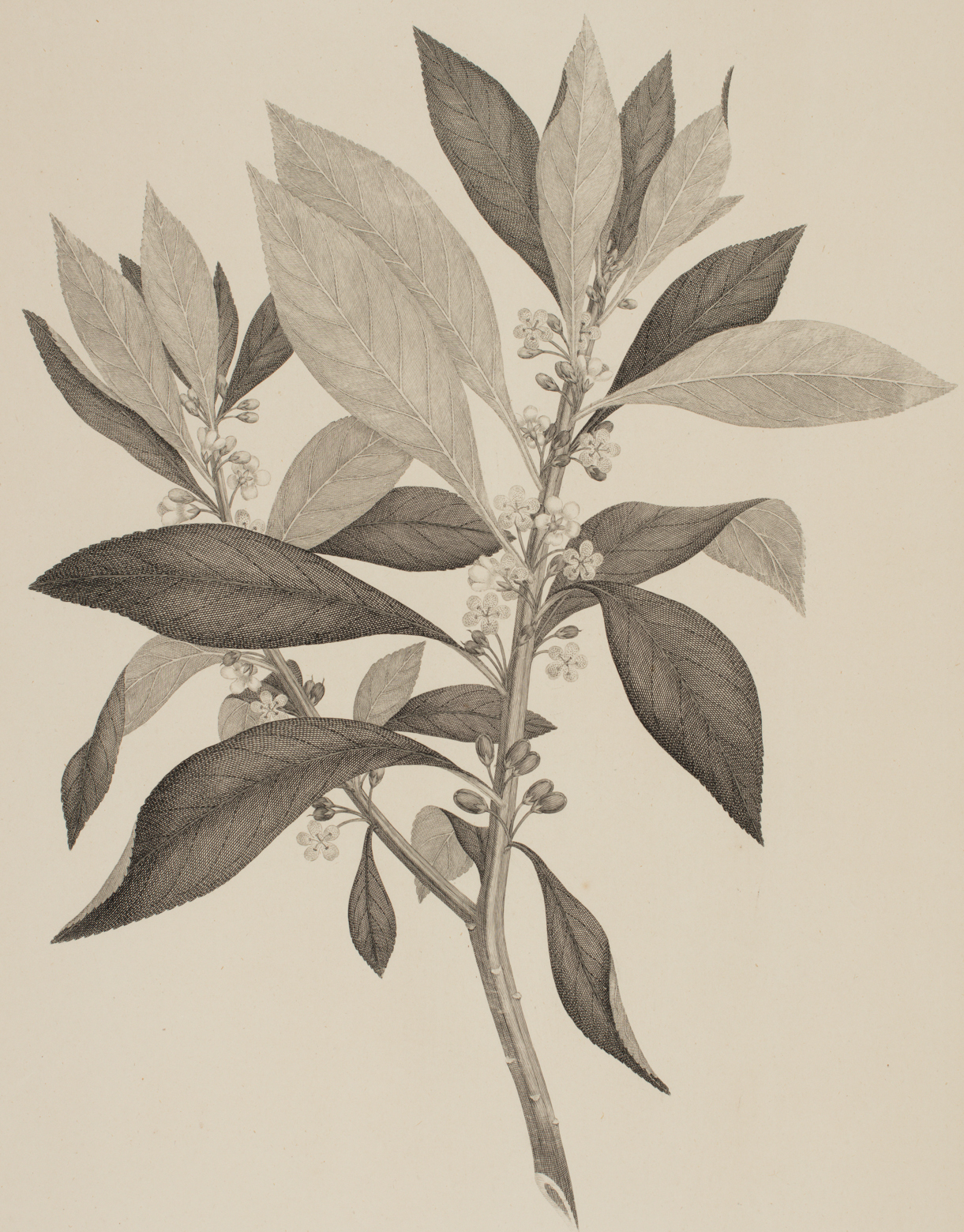
1895 engraving by Sydney Parkinson

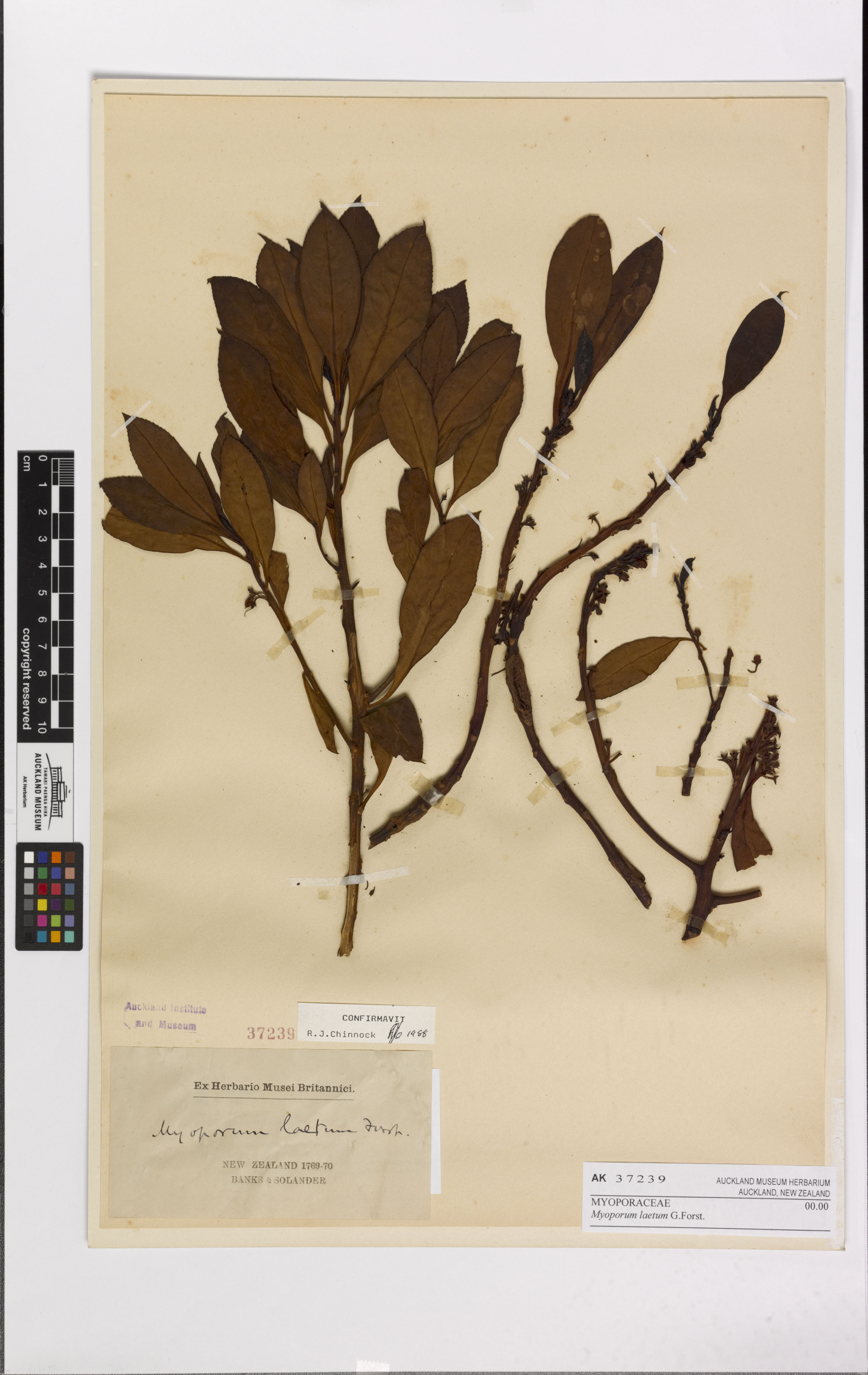
Herbarium specimen

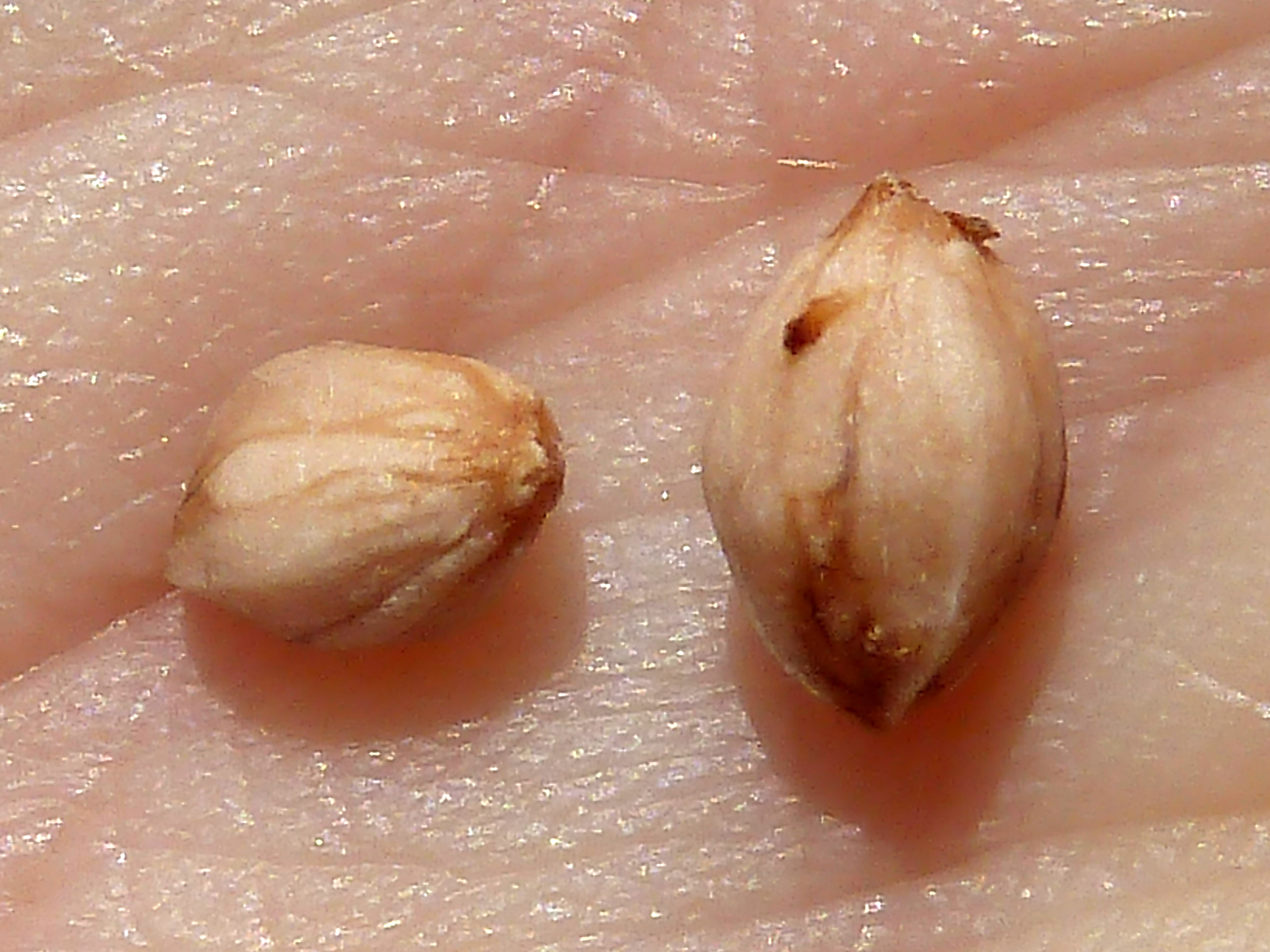
Seed

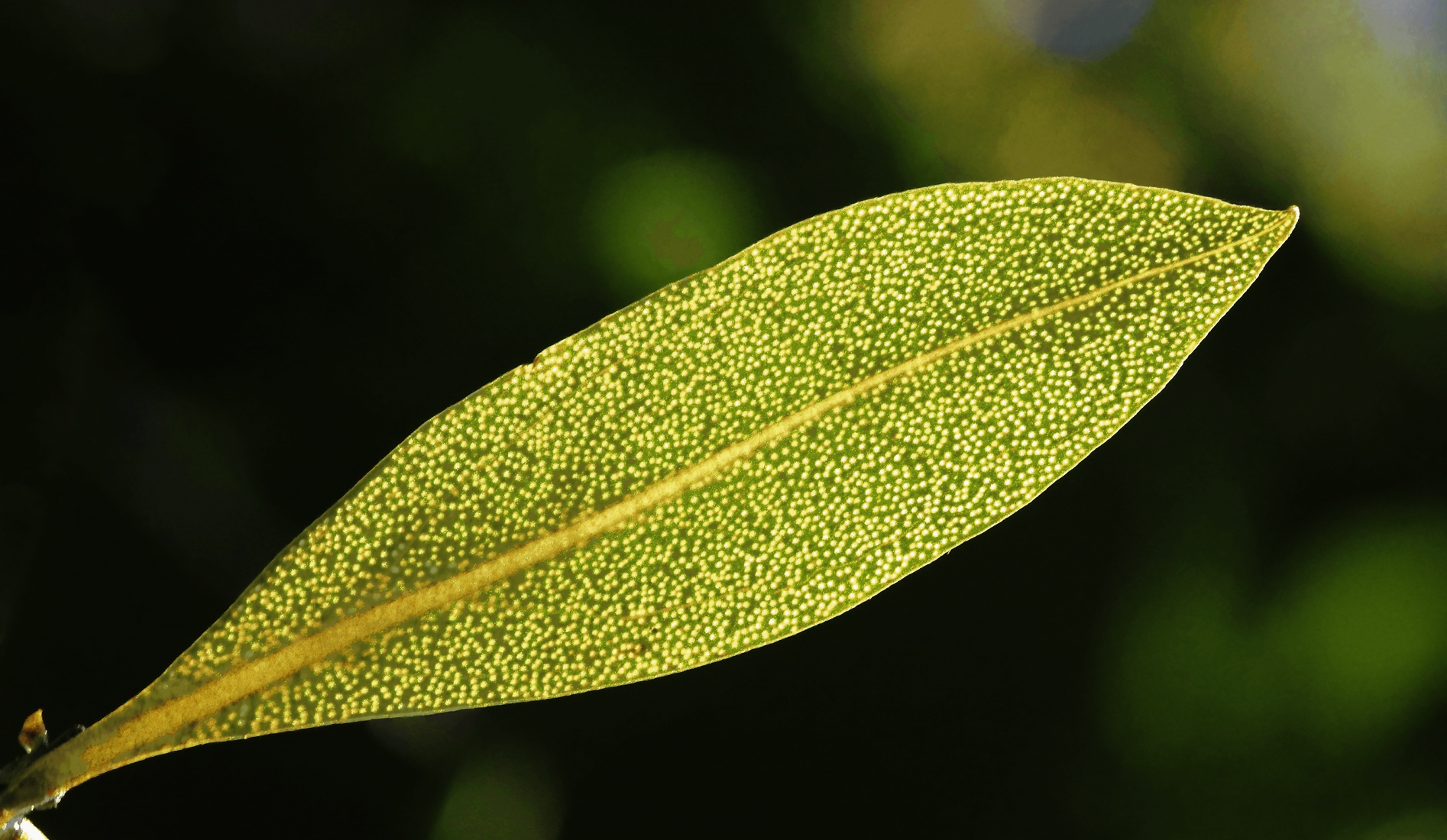
Leaf

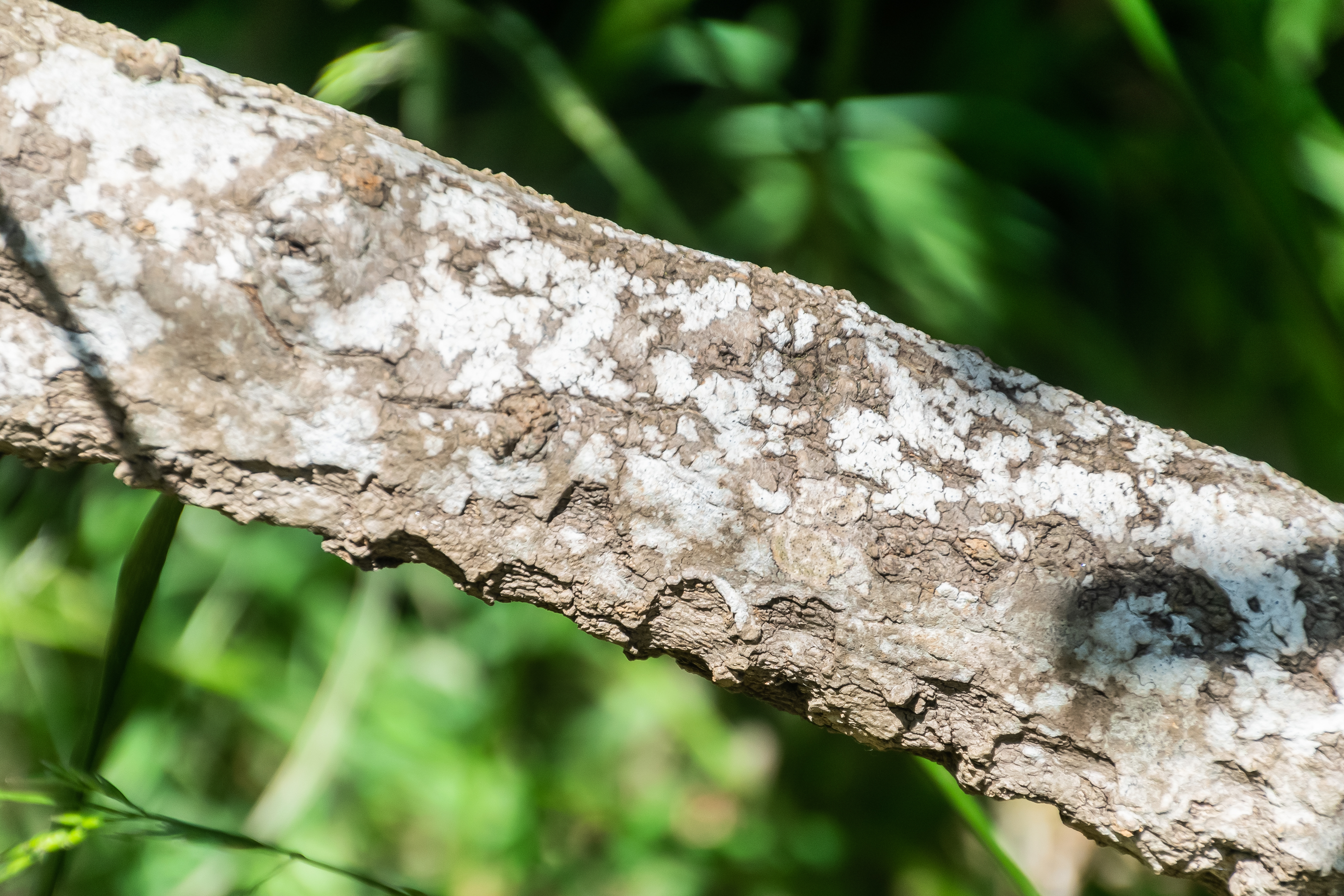
Bark

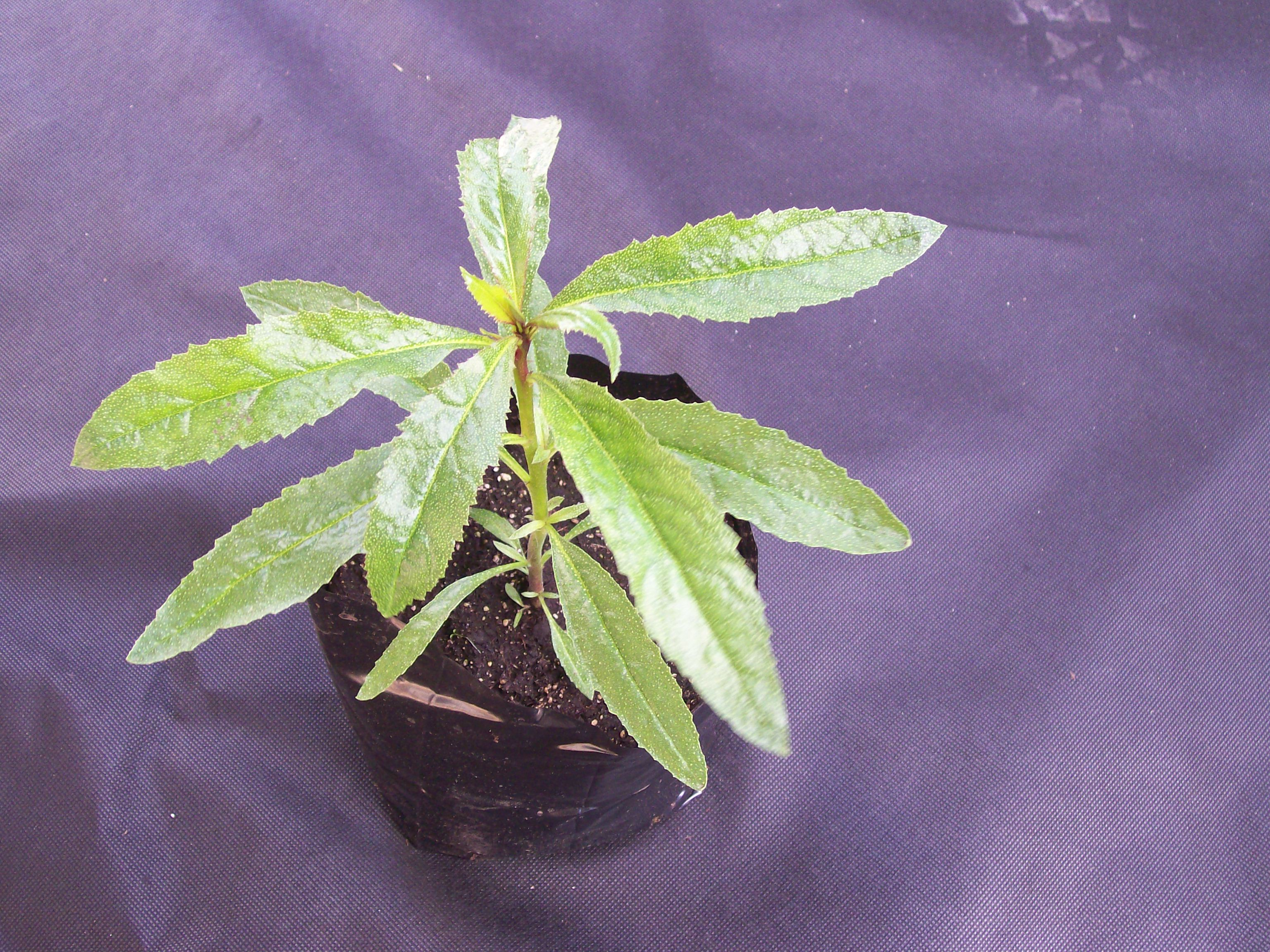
Juvenile cultivated plant

== See also ==
- Catherine Alexander (botanist)
