= C. spectabilis =

C. spectabilis may refer to:

- Carex spectabilis, a sedge species
- Cattleya pumila, an orchid species
- Celeus spectabilis, the rufous-headed woodpecker, a bird species
- Celmisia spectabilis, a flowering plant species
- Chionothremma spectabilis, a moth species
- Chrysolopus spectabilis, a weevil species
- Corolla spectabilis, a sea butterfly species
- Costus spectabilis, a plant species

== Synonyms ==
- Callichroma spectabilis, a synonym of Callichroma velutinum, a beetle species
- Cosmos spectabilis, a synonym of Cosmos bipinnatus, a flowering plant species
