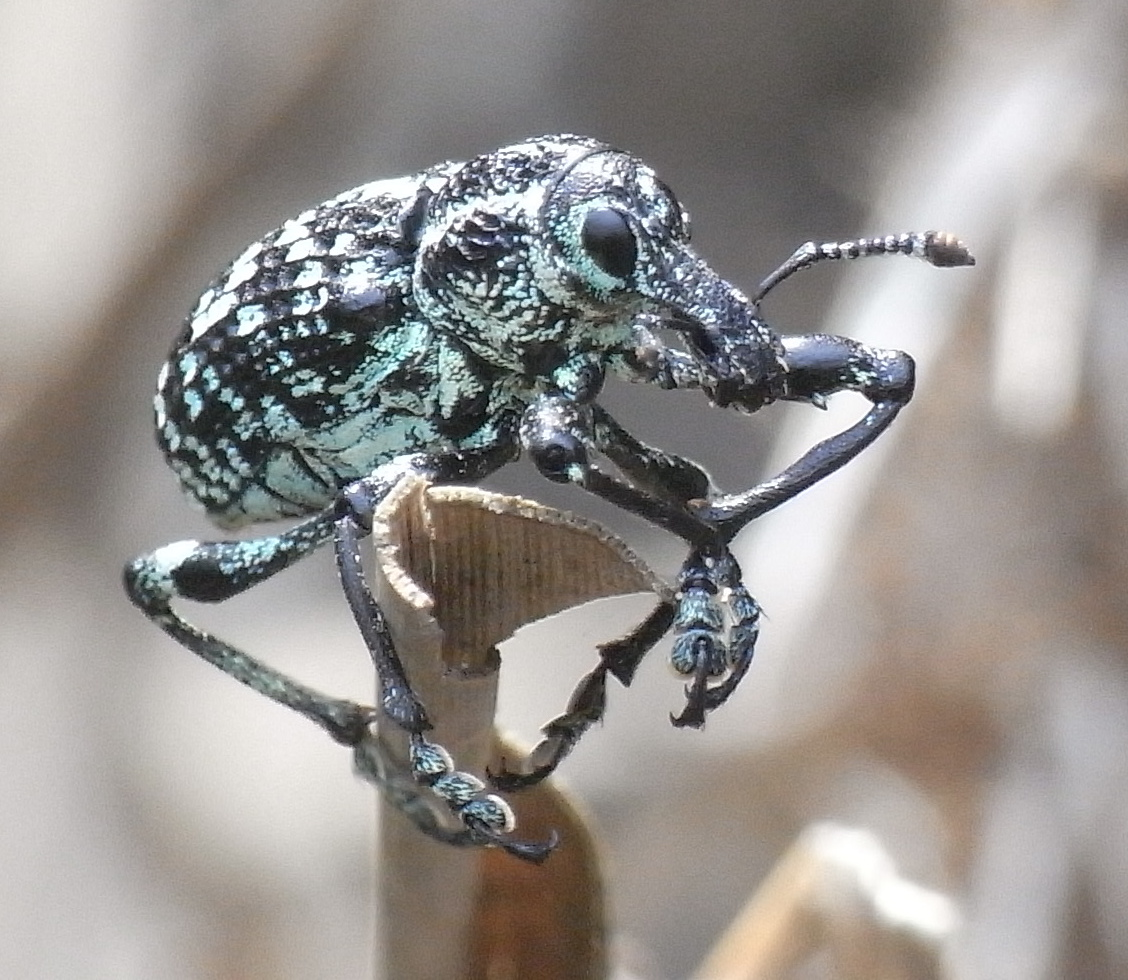
- Chrysolopus spectabilis

Scientific classification
- Domain: Eukaryota
- Kingdom: Animalia
- Phylum: Arthropoda
- Class: Insecta
- Order: Coleoptera
- Suborder: Polyphaga
- Infraorder: Cucujiformia
- Family: Curculionidae
- Subfamily: Cyclominae
- Tribe: Aterpini; Lacordaire, 1863

Subtribus
- Aterpina; Rhadinosomina

= Aterpini =

Tribe of beetles

Aterpini is a weevil tribe in the subfamily Cyclominae.

== Genera ==
- Aades
- Aegorhinus
- Acalonoma
- Aesiotes
- Alastoropolus
- Alphitopis
- Anagotus
- Anomocis
- Aoplocnemis
- Aromagis
- Atelicus
- Aterpodes
- Cechides
- Chrysolopus
- Chrysophoracis
- Dexagia
- Dixoncis
- Euthyphasis
- Heterotyles
- Iphisaxus
- Julietiella
- Lyperopais
- Micropolus
- Nemestra
- Oenopus
- Ophthalmorychus
- Pelororhinus
- Pocius
- Psuchocephalus
- Rhadinosomus
- Rhinaria
- Rhinoplethes
- Stenotherium
- ?Aromagis
- ?Atelicus
- ?Kershawcis
- ?Strongylorhinus

== Gallery ==
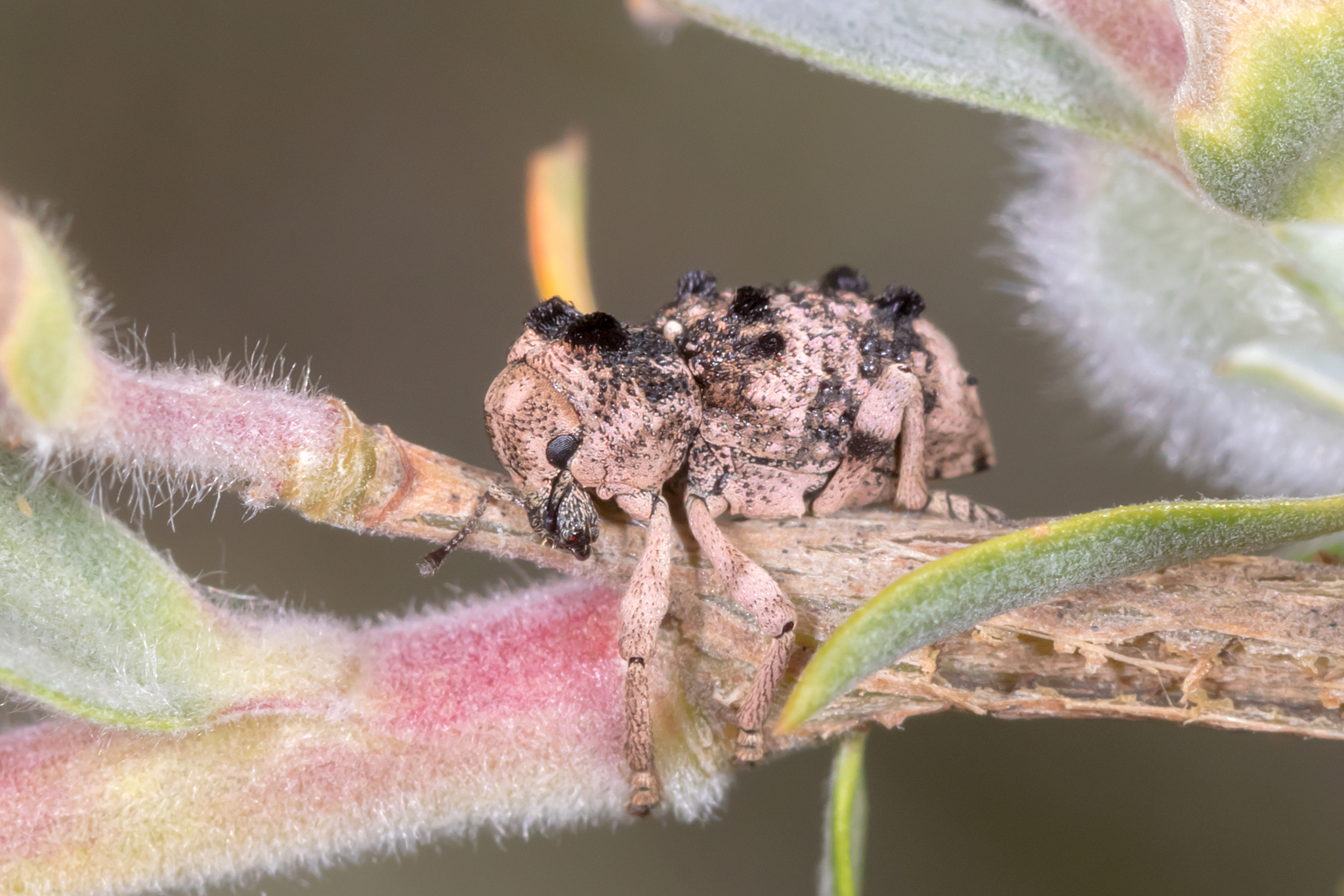
Aades cultratus

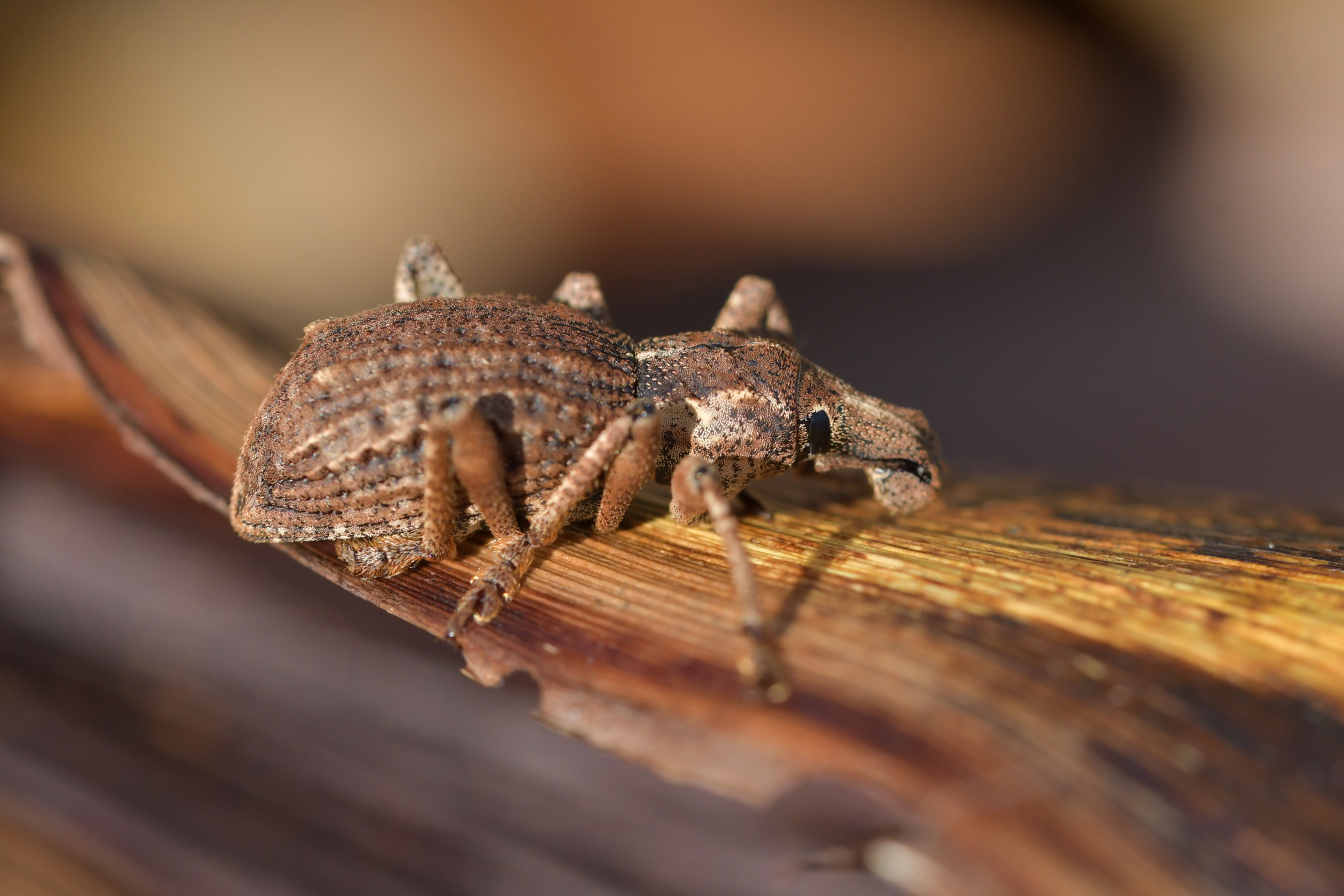
Anagotus fairburni

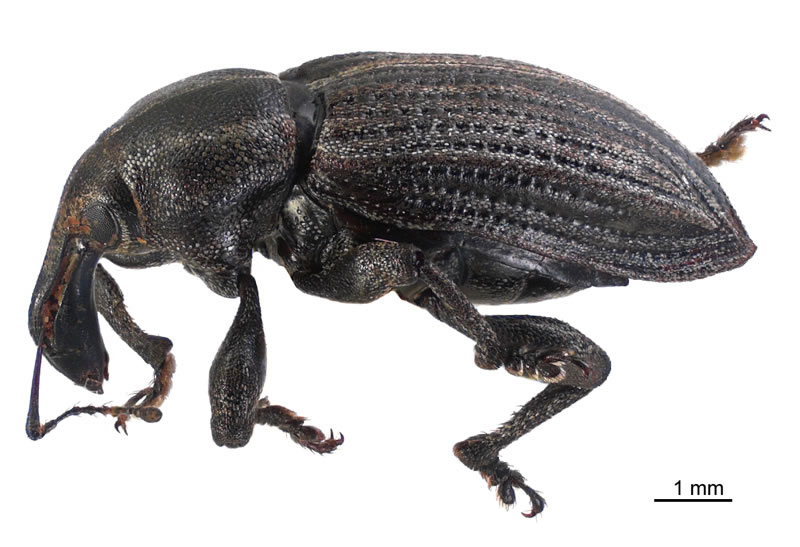
Lyperopais mirus

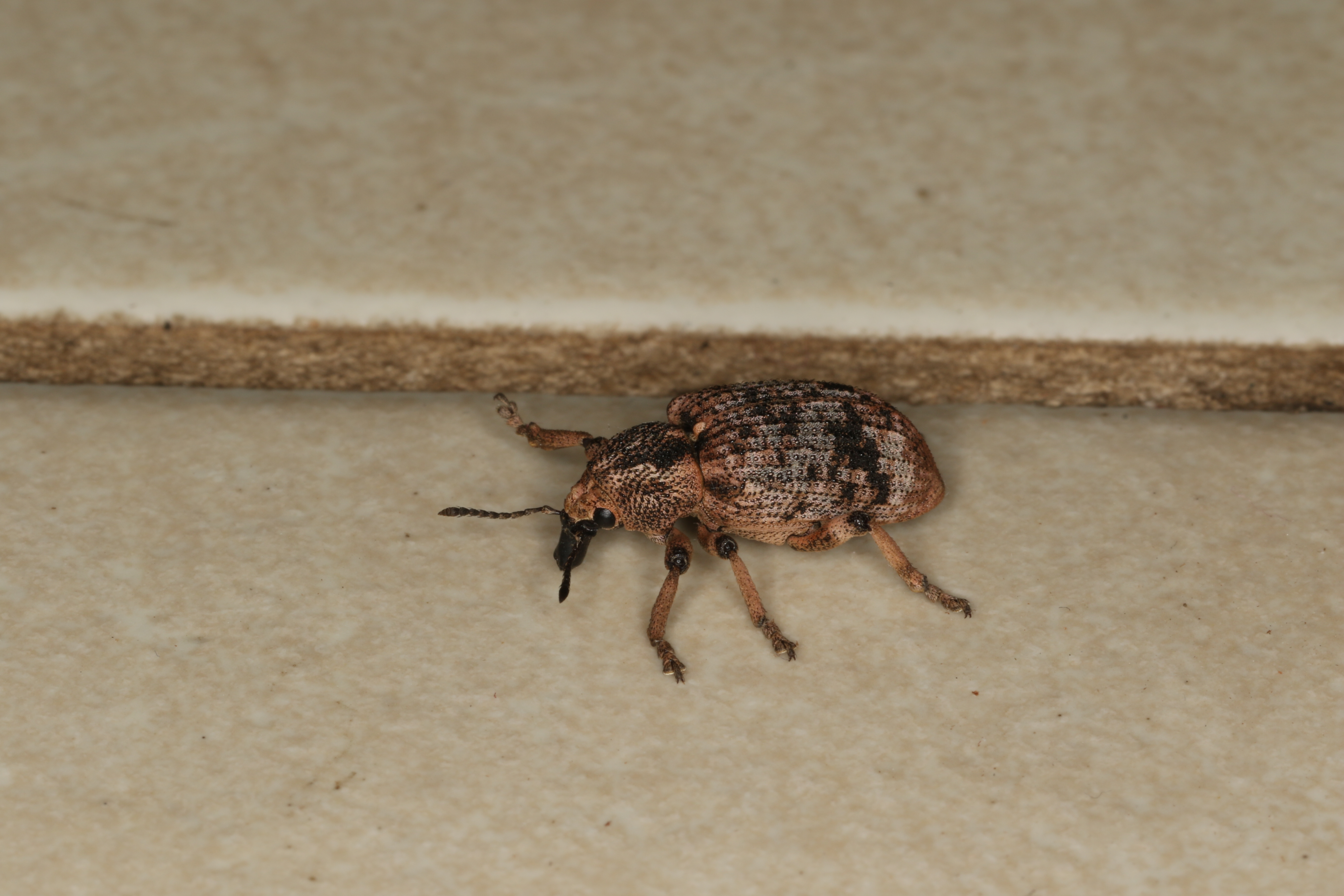
Rhinaria caliginosa
