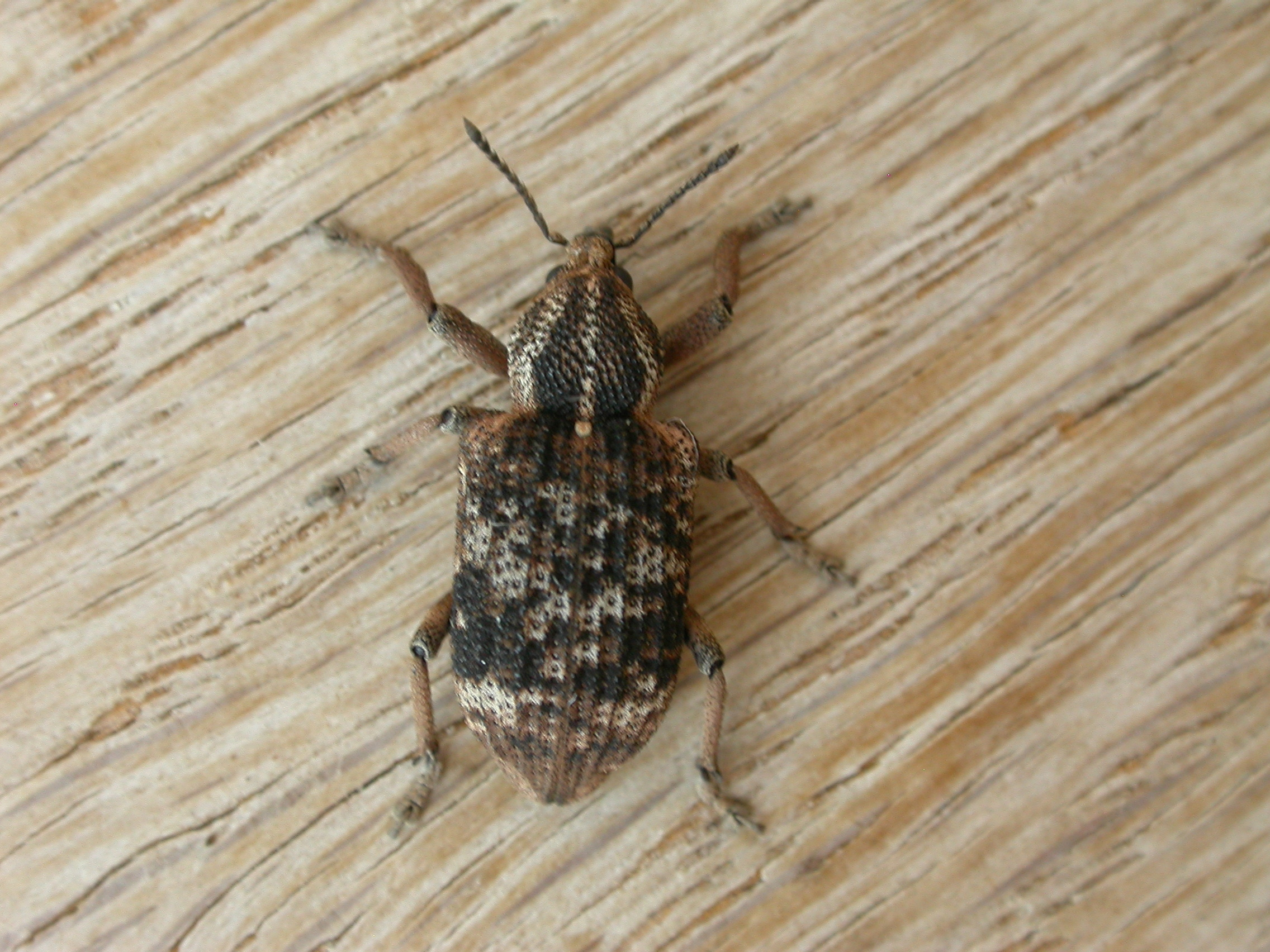
- Rhinaria caliginosa

Scientific classification
- Domain: Eukaryota
- Kingdom: Animalia
- Phylum: Arthropoda
- Class: Insecta
- Order: Coleoptera
- Suborder: Polyphaga
- Infraorder: Cucujiformia
- Family: Curculionidae
- Subfamily: Cyclominae
- Tribe: Aterpini
- Genus: Rhinaria; Kirby, 1819

Species
- See text

= Rhinaria (weevil) =

Genus of beetles

Rhinaria is an Australian genus of weevils in the family Curculionidae and subfamily Cyclominae.

== Description ==
According to the original description by William Kirby, weevils in this genus have an oblong-ovate body. The labrum is barely distinct while the labium is subtrapezoidal. The mandibles are edentate (without teeth). The maxillae are open ("apertæ"). The palps are very short and conical. The mentum is quadrate. The antennae are entire with closely connected segments and 3-segmented clubs. The thorax is subglobose.

== Species ==
The following species are included in this genus:

- Rhinaria aberrans Lea, 1904
- Rhinaria caliginosa Pascoe, 1872
- Rhinaria concavirostris Lea, 1904
- Rhinaria convexirostris Lea, 1904
- Rhinaria cristata Kirby, 1819
- Rhinaria excavata Boisduval, 1835
- Rhinaria fasciata Pascoe, 1873
- Rhinaria favosa Lea, 1904
- Rhinaria foveipennis Pascoe, 1872
- Rhinaria granulosa (Fåhraeus, 1842)
- Rhinaria grisea Boisduval, 1835
- Rhinaria rugosa Boisduval, 1835
- Rhinaria signifera Pascoe, 1883
- Rhinaria tessellata Pascoe, 1883
- Rhinaria tibialis Blackburn, 1892
- Rhinaria tragocephala Lea, 1904
