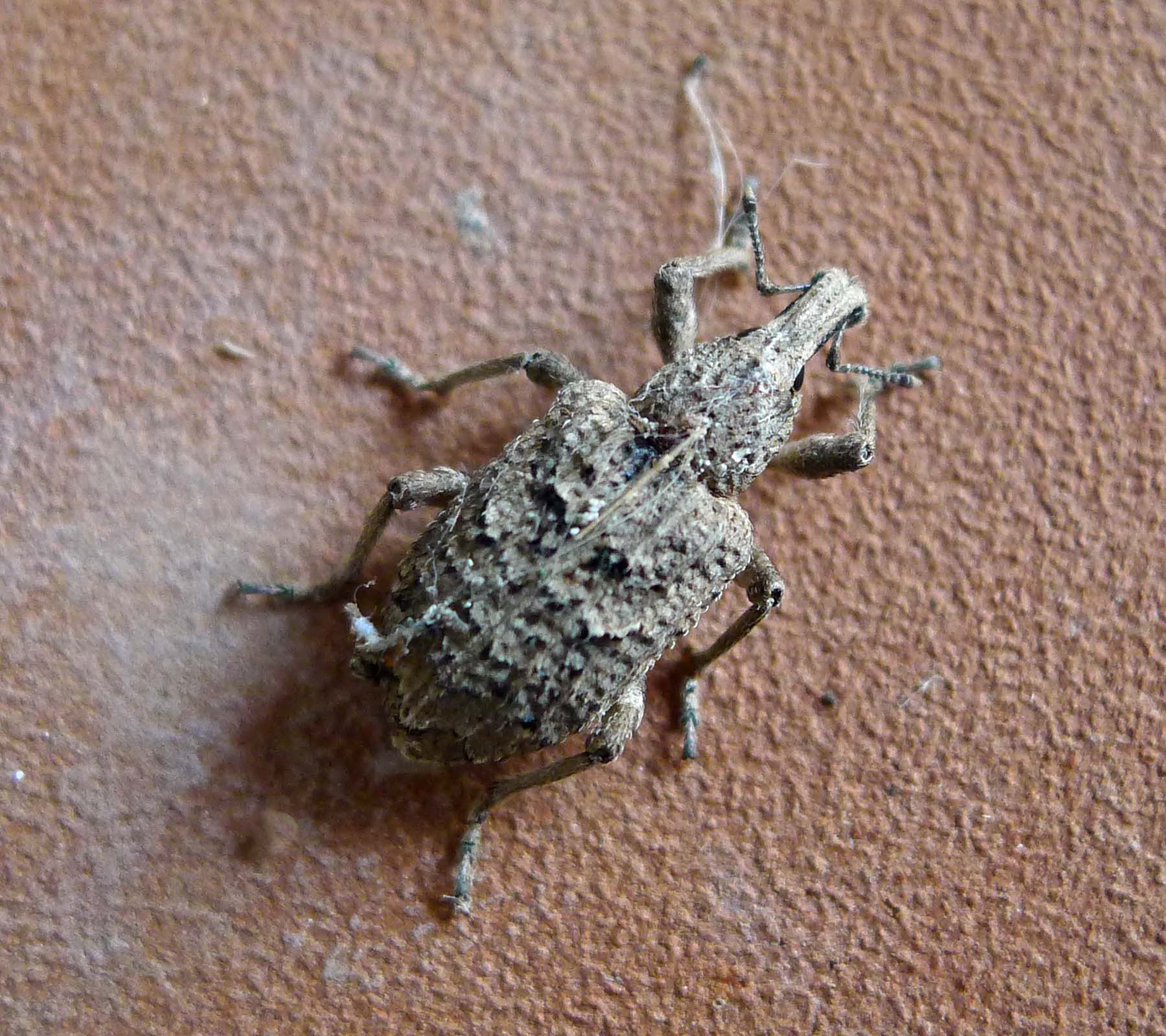

Scientific classification
- Kingdom: Animalia
- Phylum: Arthropoda
- Clade: Pancrustacea
- Class: Insecta
- Order: Coleoptera
- Suborder: Polyphaga
- Infraorder: Cucujiformia
- Superfamily: Curculionoidea
- Family: Curculionidae
- Subfamily: Cyclominae
- Tribe: Rhytirrhinini
- Genus: Gronops; Schönherr, 1823

Synonyms
- Anlacus Deajean, 1821; Aulacus Schönherr, 1826; Peroscelis Gemminger & Harold, 1871

= Gronops =

Genus of beetles

Gronops is a genus of beetles belonging to the family Curculionidae.

The genus was first described by Schönherr in 1823.

The genus has cosmopolitan distribution.

Species include:

- Gronops inaequalis
- Gronops lunatus
