= Cirsium libanoticum =

Scientific classification
- Kingdom: Plantae
- Clade: Tracheophytes
- Clade: Angiosperms
- Clade: Eudicots
- Clade: Asterids
- Order: Asterales
- Family: Asteraceae
- Genus: Cirsium
- Section: Cirsium sect. Cirsium
- Species: C. libanoticum

Binomial name
- Cirsium libanoticum DC.

Species of flowering plant

Cirsium libanoticum is a perennial or biennial thistle native to the eastern Mediterranean and parts of western and central Asia. Augustin Pyramus de Candolle described the species in 1838. Three subspecies are recognized.

== Taxonomy and naming ==
Cirsium libanoticum was described by Augustin Pyramus de Candolle in 1838, in volume 6 of Prodromus Systematis Naturalis Regni Vegetabilis. In 1975, Peter Hadland Davis and Margaret Jill Parris recognized three subspecies of C. libanoticum in their treatment of the genus for the Flora of Turkey.

== Description ==
The plant has an erect, grooved stem. Its leaves sparsely hirsute. The stem leaves are crowded, decurrent, pinnately lobed and spiny, with strong yellowish spines of unequal length. The flower heads are clustered and sessile among the uppermost leaves at the top of the stem. The bracts of the egg-shaped involucre are pressed flat and hairless, and taper into a small spine. The corolla is yellowish-white.

== Subspecies and distribution ==
The native distribution of Cirsium libanoticum is primarily centered on the Near East, across southern and central Turkey (Anatolia), Syria, Lebanon, northeastern Iraq, Iran, and Turkmenistan. Three distinct subspecies are currently recognized:

- Cirsium libanoticum subsp. libanoticum – The nominate subspecies. It occurs in several regions of Anatolia, as well as Syria and Lebanon.
- Cirsium libanoticum subsp. arachnoideum P.H.Davis & Parris (1975)
- Cirsium libanoticum subsp. lycaonicum (Boiss. & Heldr.) P.H.Davis & Parris (1975)
