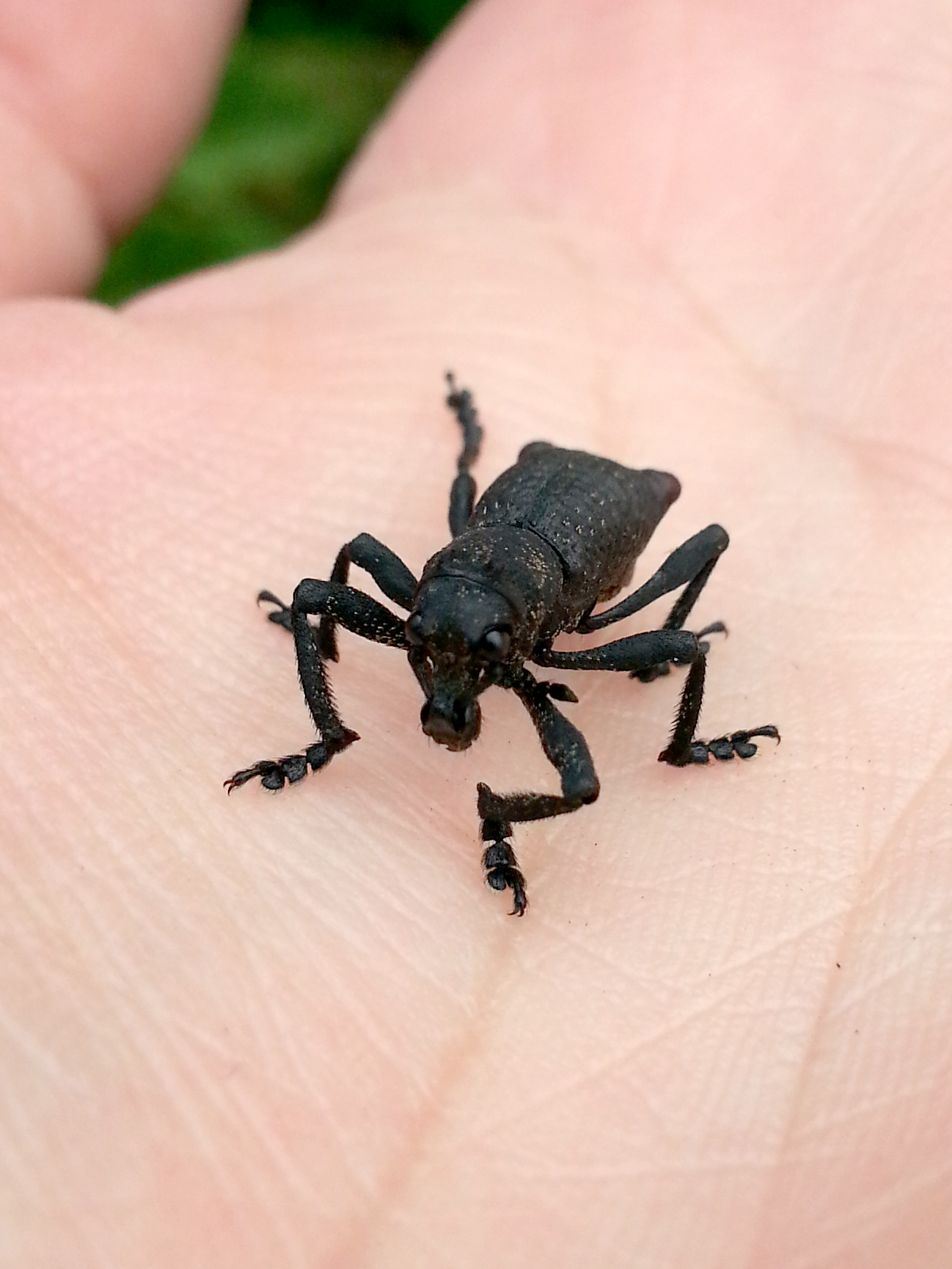
- Aegorhinus vitulus

Scientific classification
- Kingdom: Animalia
- Phylum: Arthropoda
- Class: Insecta
- Order: Coleoptera
- Suborder: Polyphaga
- Infraorder: Cucujiformia
- Family: Curculionidae
- Subfamily: Cyclominae
- Tribe: Aterpini
- Genus: Aegorhinus; W.F.Erichson, 1834

Synonyms
- Psuchocephalus Latreille, 1828

= Aegorhinus =

Genus of weevils

Aegorhinus is a genus of weevil in the tribe Aterpini. Species in this genus are native to southern South America. Despite being a native species, the raspberry weevil Aegorhinus superciliosus is regarded as an important pest in blueberry and raspberry fields in Chile.
