= Chionothremma combusta =

Scientific classification
- Kingdom: Animalia
- Phylum: Arthropoda
- Class: Insecta
- Order: Lepidoptera
- Family: Tortricidae
- Genus: Chionothremma
- Species: C. combusta

Binomial name
- Chionothremma combusta Diakonoff, 1952

Species of moth

Chionothremma combusta is a species of moth of the family Tortricidae. It is found in New Guinea.
