= Callichroma magnificum =

Scientific classification
- Domain: Eukaryota
- Kingdom: Animalia
- Phylum: Arthropoda
- Class: Insecta
- Order: Coleoptera
- Suborder: Polyphaga
- Infraorder: Cucujiformia
- Family: Cerambycidae
- Genus: Callichroma
- Species: C. magnificum

Binomial name
- Callichroma magnificum Napp & Martins, 2009

Species of beetle

Callichroma magnificum is a species of beetle in the family Cerambycidae. It was described by Napp and Martins in 2009. It is known from Colombia.
