= Callichroma minimum =

Scientific classification
- Domain: Eukaryota
- Kingdom: Animalia
- Phylum: Arthropoda
- Class: Insecta
- Order: Coleoptera
- Suborder: Polyphaga
- Infraorder: Cucujiformia
- Family: Cerambycidae
- Genus: Callichroma
- Species: C. minimum

Binomial name
- Callichroma minimum Podany, 1966

Synonyms
- Callichroma minima Podany, 1965

Species of beetle

Callichroma minimum is a species of beetle in the family Cerambycidae. It was described by Podany in 1965. It is known from Nicaragua.
