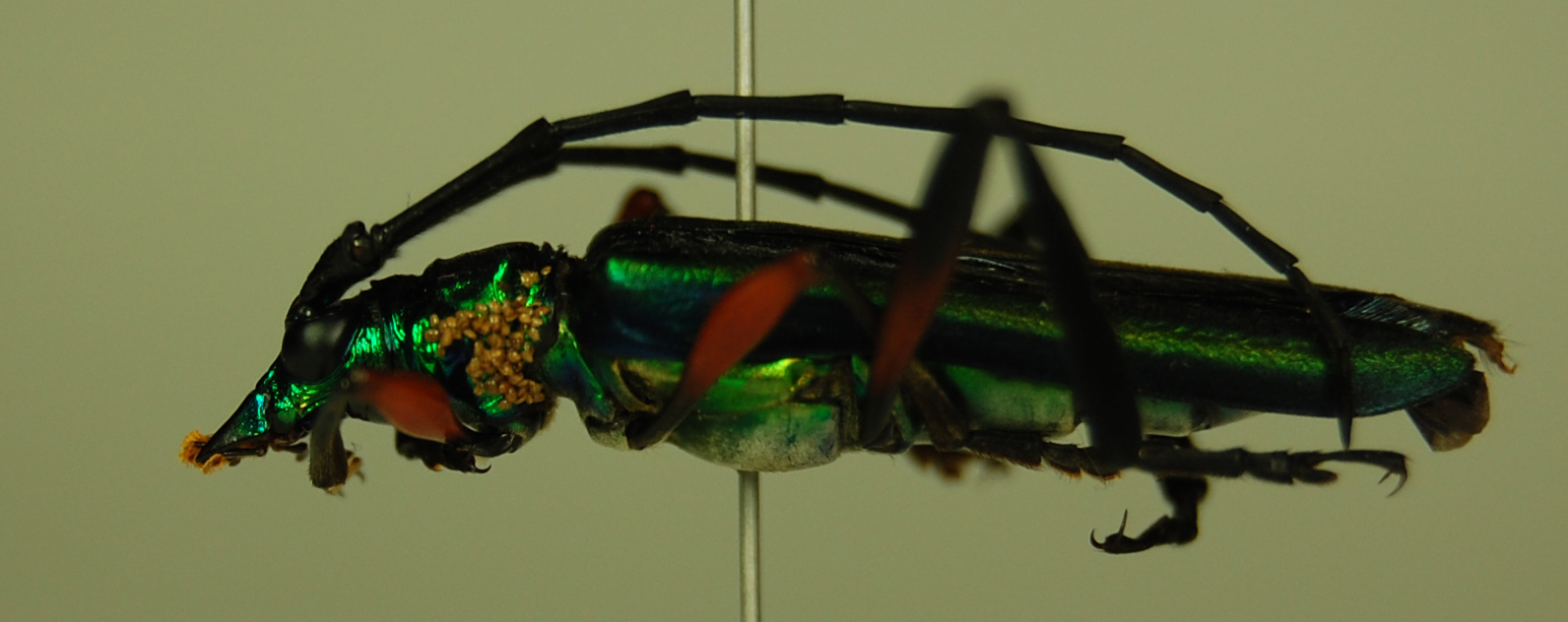

Scientific classification
- Domain: Eukaryota
- Kingdom: Animalia
- Phylum: Arthropoda
- Class: Insecta
- Order: Coleoptera
- Suborder: Polyphaga
- Infraorder: Cucujiformia
- Family: Cerambycidae
- Genus: Callichroma
- Species: C. seiunctum

Binomial name
- Callichroma seiunctum Schmidt, 1924

= Callichroma seiunctum =

Species of beetle

Callichroma seiunctum is a species of beetle in the family Cerambycidae. It was described by Schmidt in 1924. It is known from Peru.
