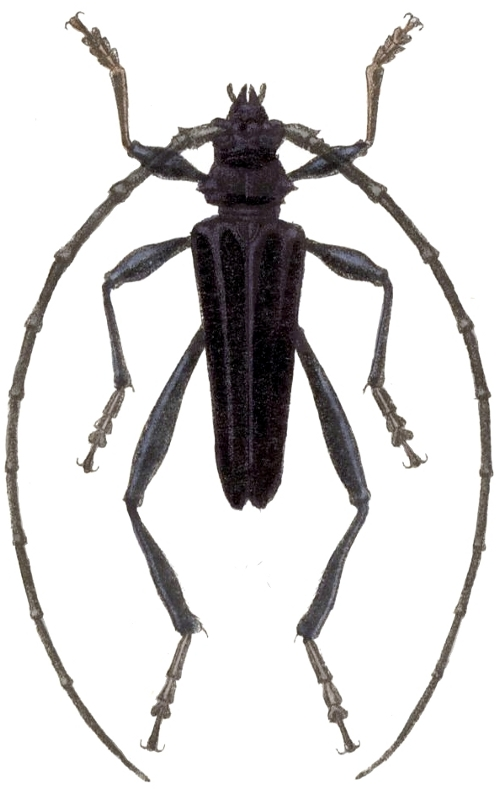

Scientific classification
- Domain: Eukaryota
- Kingdom: Animalia
- Phylum: Arthropoda
- Class: Insecta
- Order: Coleoptera
- Suborder: Polyphaga
- Infraorder: Cucujiformia
- Family: Cerambycidae
- Genus: Callichroma
- Species: C. cyanomelas

Binomial name
- Callichroma cyanomelas White, 1853

= Callichroma cyanomelas =

Species of beetle

Callichroma cyanomelas is a species of beetle in the family Cerambycidae. It was described by White in 1853. It is known from Mexico and Panama.
