= Cechides =

Scientific classification
- Domain: Eukaryota
- Kingdom: Animalia
- Phylum: Arthropoda
- Class: Insecta
- Order: Coleoptera
- Suborder: Polyphaga
- Infraorder: Cucujiformia
- Family: Curculionidae
- Tribe: Aterpini
- Genus: Cechides; Pascoe, [1872]

Species
- Cechides amoenus

Genus of beetles

Cechides is a weevil genus in the tribe Aterpini.
