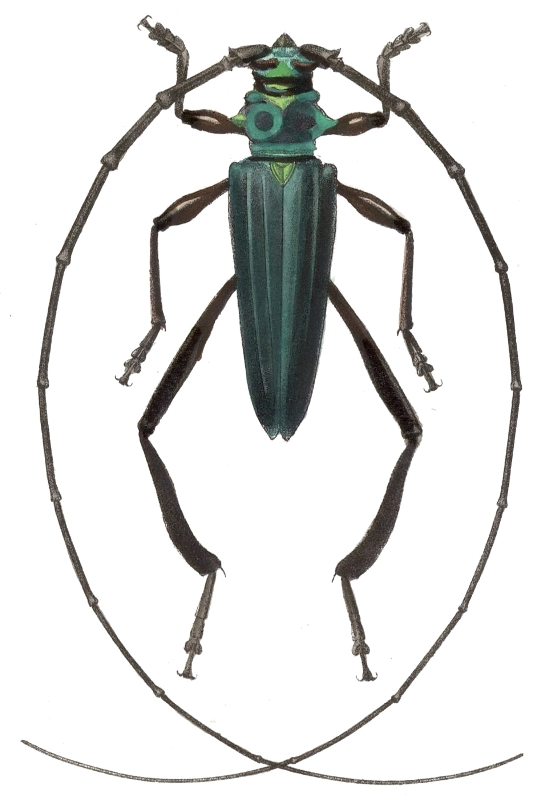
- Callichroma holochlorum holochlorum

Scientific classification
- Domain: Eukaryota
- Kingdom: Animalia
- Phylum: Arthropoda
- Class: Insecta
- Order: Coleoptera
- Suborder: Polyphaga
- Infraorder: Cucujiformia
- Family: Cerambycidae
- Genus: Callichroma
- Species: C. holochlorum

Binomial name
- Callichroma holochlorum Bates, 1872

Synonyms
- Callichroma carinatum Schmidt, 1924; Callichroma chiriquina Bates, 1879; Callichroma compressipes Casey, 1912; Callichroma opiparum Bates, 1874; Callichroma regalis Casey, 1912; Callichroma holochlorum ab. Rufovarium Aurivlllius, 1912

= Callichroma holochlorum =

Species of beetle

Callichroma holochlorum is a species of beetle in the family Cerambycidae. It was described by Henry Walter Bates in 1872. It is known from Mexico, Colombia, and Venezuela. It contains the subspecies Callichroma holochlorum holochlorum and Callichroma holochlorum melancholicum.
