= Chionothremma sanguens =

Scientific classification
- Kingdom: Animalia
- Phylum: Arthropoda
- Class: Insecta
- Order: Lepidoptera
- Family: Tortricidae
- Genus: Chionothremma
- Species: C. sanguens

Binomial name
- Chionothremma sanguens Diakonoff, 1952

Species of moth

Chionothremma sanguens is a species of moth of the family Tortricidae. It is found in New Guinea.
