= Corolla ovata =

Scientific classification
- Kingdom: Animalia
- Phylum: Mollusca
- Class: Gastropoda
- Clade: Euopisthobranchia
- Order: Pteropoda
- Family: Cymbuliidae
- Genus: Corolla
- Species: C. ovata

Binomial name
- Corolla ovata (Quoy & Gaimard, 1833)

Species of Gastropoda

Corolla ovata is a species of gastropod in the family Cymbuliidae.
