= Chionothremma melanoleuca =

Scientific classification
- Kingdom: Animalia
- Phylum: Arthropoda
- Class: Insecta
- Order: Lepidoptera
- Family: Tortricidae
- Genus: Chionothremma
- Species: C. melanoleuca

Binomial name
- Chionothremma melanoleuca (Diakonoff, 1944)

Synonyms
- Zacorisca melanoleuca Diakonoff, 1944

Species of moth

Chionothremma melanoleuca is a species of moth of the family Tortricidae. It is found in New Guinea.
