= Callichroma onorei =

Scientific classification
- Domain: Eukaryota
- Kingdom: Animalia
- Phylum: Arthropoda
- Class: Insecta
- Order: Coleoptera
- Suborder: Polyphaga
- Infraorder: Cucujiformia
- Family: Cerambycidae
- Genus: Callichroma
- Species: C. onorei

Binomial name
- Callichroma onorei Giesbert, 1998

Species of beetle

Callichroma onorei is a species of beetle in the family Cerambycidae. It was described by Giesbert in 1998. It is known from Ecuador.
