= Chionothremma =

Scientific classification
- Kingdom: Animalia
- Phylum: Arthropoda
- Class: Insecta
- Order: Lepidoptera
- Family: Tortricidae
- Subfamily: Tortricinae
- Tribe: Archipini
- Genus: Chionothremma; Diakonoff, 1952

Synonyms
- Diphteropyga Diakonoff, 1968; Diphtheropyga Diakonoff, 1952

Genus of tortrix moths

Chionothremma is a genus of moths belonging to the subfamily Tortricinae of the family Tortricidae. The genus was erected by Alexey Diakonoff in 1952.

== Species ==
- Chionothremma auriflua Diakonoff, 1952
- Chionothremma auripes Diakonoff, 1952
- Chionothremma caelestis Diakonoff, 1952
- Chionothremma capnoptera (Diakonoff, 1944)
- Chionothremma carbonifera Diakonoff, 1952
- Chionothremma citricaput Diakonoff, 1952
- Chionothremma combusta Diakonoff, 1952
- Chionothremma euxantha Diakonoff, 1952
- Chionothremma ferratilis Diakonoff, 1952
- Chionothremma gracilis Diakonoff, 1952
- Chionothremma marginata Diakonoff, 1952
- Chionothremma martyranthes (Meyrick, 1938)
- Chionothremma melanoleuca (Diakonoff, 1944)
- Chionothremma mesoxantha Diakonoff, 1952
- Chionothremma mutans Diakonoff, 1952
- Chionothremma nebulicola Diakonoff, 1952
- Chionothremma nigrangula Diakonoff, 1952
- Chionothremma niphadea Diakonoff, 1952
- Chionothremma nivisperennis Diakonoff, 1952
- Chionothremma obscura Diakonoff, 1952
- Chionothremma ocellata Diakonoff, 1952
- Chionothremma ochricauda Diakonoff, 1952
- Chionothremma pallescens Diakonoff, 1952
- Chionothremma placida Diakonoff, 1952
- Chionothremma plicata (Diakonoff, 1941)
- Chionothremma pythia (Meyrick, 1920)
- Chionothremma sanguens Diakonoff, 1952
- Chionothremma soligena Diakonoff, 1952
- Chionothremma spectabilis (Diakonoff, 1944)

== See also ==
- List of Tortricidae genera
