= Chionothremma pythia =

Scientific classification
- Kingdom: Animalia
- Phylum: Arthropoda
- Class: Insecta
- Order: Lepidoptera
- Family: Tortricidae
- Genus: Chionothremma
- Species: C. pythia

Binomial name
- Chionothremma pythia (Meyrick, 1920)

Synonyms
- Chresmarcha pythia Meyrick, 1920; Chresmarcha delia Meyrick, 1924; Chresmarcha patarea Meyrick, 1924

Species of moth

Chionothremma pythia is a species of moth of the family Tortricidae. It is found in New Guinea.

The wingspan is 18–26 mm. The forewings are snow-white, but the base is yellow towards the costa. There is a slender blackish costal streak, continued round termen by a fine black line forming small triangular spots with some faint pale yellow suffusion round these. The hindwings are grey.
