= Callichroma distinguendum =

Scientific classification
- Domain: Eukaryota
- Kingdom: Animalia
- Phylum: Arthropoda
- Class: Insecta
- Order: Coleoptera
- Suborder: Polyphaga
- Infraorder: Cucujiformia
- Family: Cerambycidae
- Genus: Callichroma
- Species: C. distinguendum

Binomial name
- Callichroma distinguendum Gounelle, 1911

Species of beetle

Callichroma distinguendum is a species of beetle in the family Cerambycidae. It was described by Gounelle in 1911. It is known from southeastern Brazil.
