= Chionothremma plicata =

Scientific classification
- Kingdom: Animalia
- Phylum: Arthropoda
- Class: Insecta
- Order: Lepidoptera
- Family: Tortricidae
- Genus: Chionothremma
- Species: C. plicata

Binomial name
- Chionothremma plicata (Diakonoff, 1941)

Synonyms
- Zacorisca plicata Diakonoff, 1941

Species of moth

Chionothremma plicata is a species of moth of the family Tortricidae. It is found in New Guinea.
