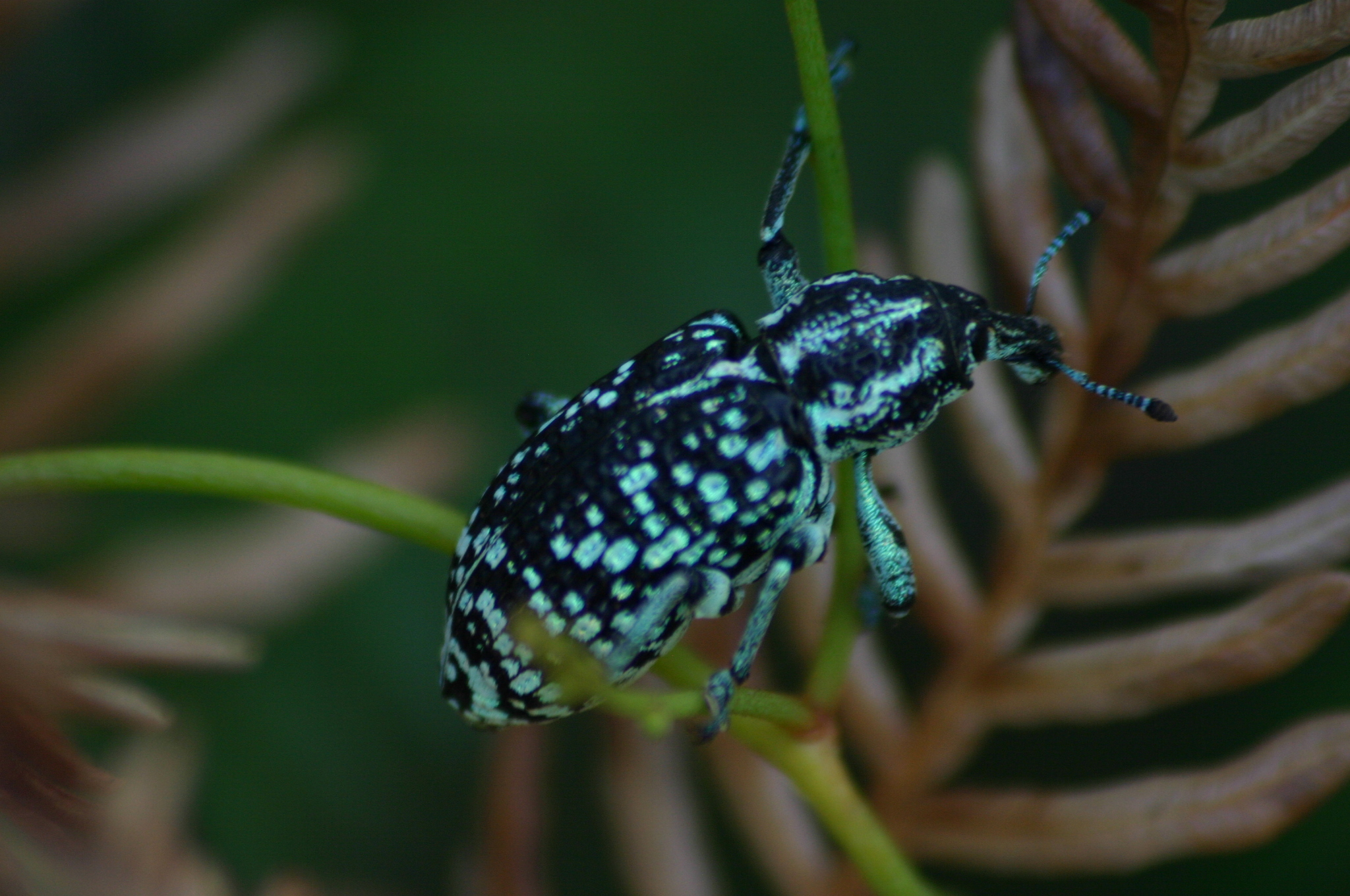
- Chrysolopus spectabilis

Scientific classification
- Domain: Eukaryota
- Kingdom: Animalia
- Phylum: Arthropoda
- Class: Insecta
- Order: Coleoptera
- Suborder: Polyphaga
- Infraorder: Cucujiformia
- Family: Curculionidae
- Tribe: Aterpini
- Genus: Chrysolopus; Germar 1817

Species
- see text

= Chrysolopus =

Genus of beetles

Chrysolopus is a genus of weevils in the family Curculionidae ("true weevils").

== Species ==
- Chrysolopus bicristatus Dejean, 1821
- Chrysolopus echidna Dejean, 1821
- Chrysolopus echidna MacLeay, 1827
- Chrysolopus forströmi Billberg, 1820
- Chrysolopus gibbosus Billberg, 1820
- Chrysolopus prodigus Germar, 1817
- Chrysolopus quadrigens MacLeay, 1827
- Chrysolopus rohrii Billberg, 1820
- Chrysolopus schoenherri Billberg, 1820
- Chrysolopus spectabilis Germar, 1817
- Chrysolopus spengleri Billberg, 1820
- Chrysolopus tamarisci Billberg, 1820
- Chrysolopus tuberculatus Dejean, 1821
