= Chionothremma capnoptera =

Scientific classification
- Kingdom: Animalia
- Phylum: Arthropoda
- Class: Insecta
- Order: Lepidoptera
- Family: Tortricidae
- Genus: Chionothremma
- Species: C. capnoptera

Binomial name
- Chionothremma capnoptera (Diakonoff, 1944)

Synonyms
- Zacorisca capnoptera Diakonoff, 1944

Species of moth

Chionothremma capnoptera is a species of moth of the family Tortricidae. It is found in New Guinea.
