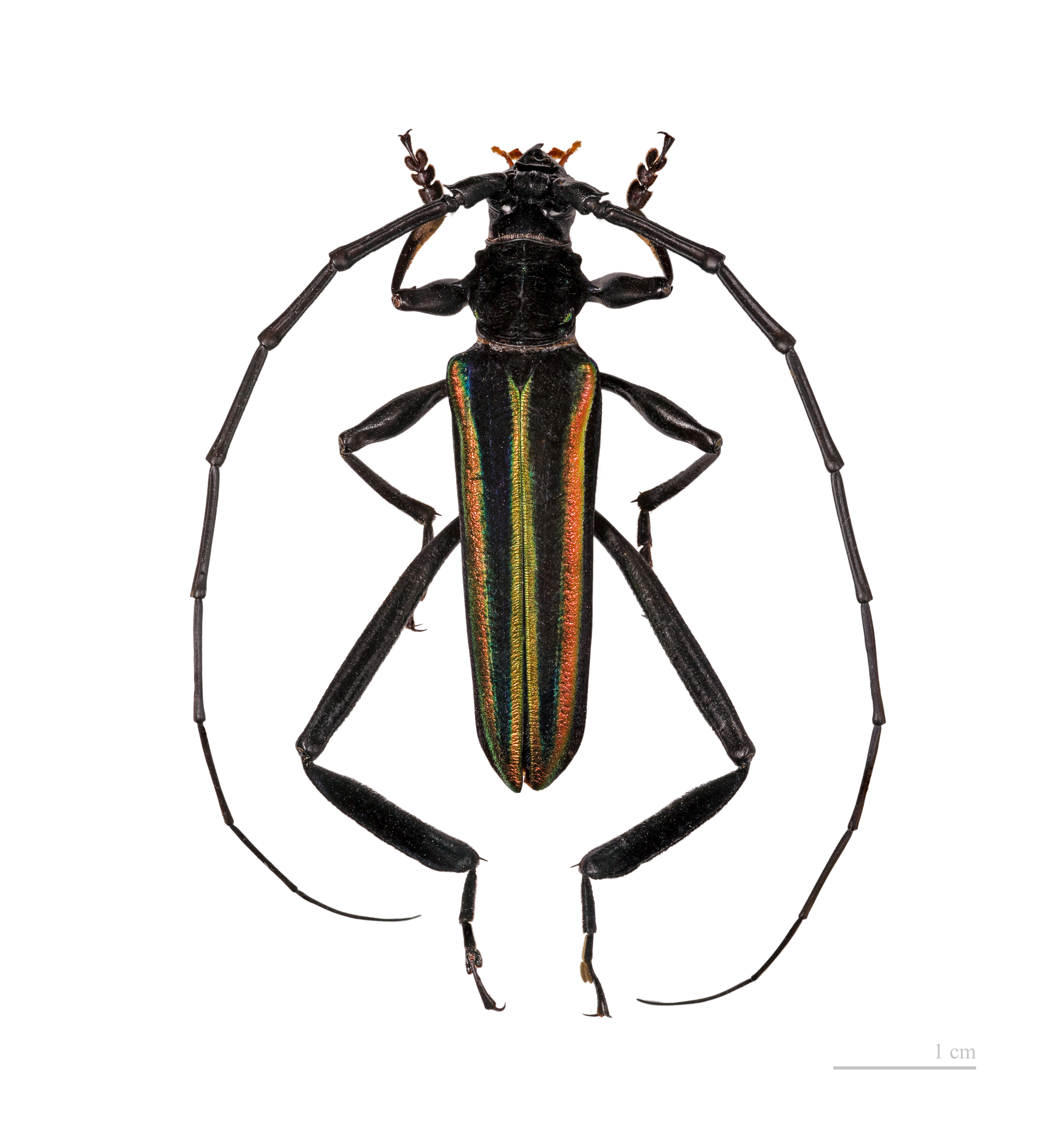
- Callichroma auricomum

Scientific classification
- Kingdom: Animalia
- Phylum: Arthropoda
- Class: Insecta
- Order: Coleoptera
- Suborder: Polyphaga
- Infraorder: Cucujiformia
- Family: Cerambycidae
- Tribe: Callichromatini
- Genus: Callichroma; Latreille, 1816

= Callichroma =

Genus of beetle

Callichroma is a genus of beetles in the family Cerambycidae, containing the following species:

- Callichroma atroviride Schmidt, 1924
- Callichroma auricomum (Linnaeus, 1767)
- Callichroma batesi Gahan, 1894
- Callichroma cosmicum White, 1853
- Callichroma cyanomelas White, 1853
- Callichroma distinguendum Gounelle, 1911
- Callichroma euthalia Bates, 1879
- Callichroma gounellei Achard, 1910
- Callichroma holochlorum Bates, 1872
- Callichroma iris Taschenberg, 1870
- Callichroma magnificum Napp & Martins, 2009
- Callichroma minimum Podany, 1965
- Callichroma omissum Schmidt, 1924
- Callichroma onorei Giesbert, 1998
- Callichroma seiunctum Schmidt, 1924
- Callichroma sericeum (Fabricius, 1792)
- Callichroma velutinum (Fabricius, 1775)
- Callichroma viridipes Bates, 1879
