= Cechides amoenus =

Scientific classification
- Kingdom: Animalia
- Phylum: Arthropoda
- Clade: Pancrustacea
- Class: Insecta
- Order: Coleoptera
- Suborder: Polyphaga
- Infraorder: Cucujiformia
- Superfamily: Curculionoidea
- Family: Curculionidae
- Genus: Cechides
- Species: C. amoenus

Binomial name
- Cechides amoenus Pascoe, 1872

Species of weevils

Cechides amoenus is a species of curculionid weevil, native to Western Australia.

It is the main seed predator of Banksia prionotes.
