= Callichroma viridipes =

Scientific classification
- Domain: Eukaryota
- Kingdom: Animalia
- Phylum: Arthropoda
- Class: Insecta
- Order: Coleoptera
- Suborder: Polyphaga
- Infraorder: Cucujiformia
- Family: Cerambycidae
- Genus: Callichroma
- Species: C. viridipes

Binomial name
- Callichroma viridipes Bates, 1879

Species of beetle

Callichroma viridipes is a species of beetle in the family Cerambycidae. It was described by Bates in 1879. It is known from Costa Rica, Panama, and Colombia.
