= Callichroma gounellei =

Scientific classification
- Domain: Eukaryota
- Kingdom: Animalia
- Phylum: Arthropoda
- Class: Insecta
- Order: Coleoptera
- Suborder: Polyphaga
- Infraorder: Cucujiformia
- Family: Cerambycidae
- Genus: Callichroma
- Species: C. gounellei

Binomial name
- Callichroma gounellei Achard, 1910

Species of beetle

Callichroma gounellei is a species of beetle in the family Cerambycidae. It was described by Achard in 1910. It is known from French Guiana. The species is 37 millimetres (1.5 in) long, have a green head and green lines on its black coloured prothorax.
