= Callichroma iris =

Scientific classification
- Domain: Eukaryota
- Kingdom: Animalia
- Phylum: Arthropoda
- Class: Insecta
- Order: Coleoptera
- Suborder: Polyphaga
- Infraorder: Cucujiformia
- Family: Cerambycidae
- Genus: Callichroma
- Species: C. iris

Binomial name
- Callichroma iris Taschenberg, 1870

Synonyms
- Callichroma fulgens Lameere, 1884; Callichroma purpuratum Lameere, 1884; Callichroma trilineatum octolineatum Podany 1965

Species of beetle

Callichroma iris is a species of beetle in the family Cerambycidae. It was described by Taschenberg in 1870. It is known from Costa Rica, Colombia, and Venezuela. It contains the subspecies Callichroma iris iris and Callichroma iris trilineatum.
