= Callichroma sericeum =

Scientific classification
- Kingdom: Animalia
- Phylum: Arthropoda
- Clade: Pancrustacea
- Class: Insecta
- Order: Coleoptera
- Suborder: Polyphaga
- Infraorder: Cucujiformia
- Family: Cerambycidae
- Genus: Callichroma
- Species: C. sericeum

Binomial name
- Callichroma sericeum (Fabricius, 1792)

Synonyms
- Callichroma brachiale Bates, 1870; Callichroma collarti Fuchs, 1959; Callichroma gisteli Schmidt, 1923; Callichroma gounellei rubricrus Schmidt, 1924; Callichroma hoffmannsi Schmidt, 1924

Species of beetle

Callichroma sericeum is a species of beetle in the family Cerambycidae. It was described by Johan Christian Fabricius in 1792. It is known from southeastern Brazil, Paraguay, Argentina, Uruguay, and Bolivia.
