= Corolla =

Corolla may refer to:

- Toyota Corolla, an automobile model name
- Corolla (botany), the petals of a flower, considered as a unit
- Corolla (headgear), an ancient headdress in the form of a circlet or crown
- Corolla (gastropod), a genus of molluscs
- Corolla, North Carolina, a town in the United States
