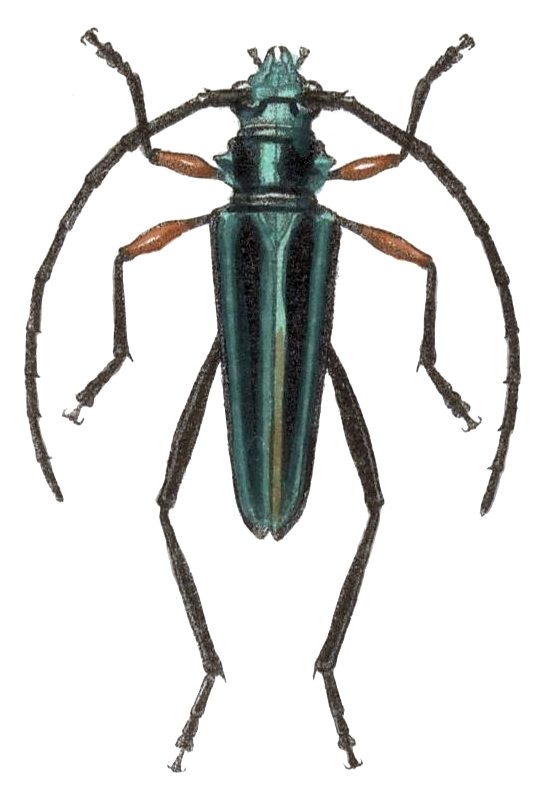

Scientific classification
- Domain: Eukaryota
- Kingdom: Animalia
- Phylum: Arthropoda
- Class: Insecta
- Order: Coleoptera
- Suborder: Polyphaga
- Infraorder: Cucujiformia
- Family: Cerambycidae
- Genus: Callichroma
- Species: C. batesi

Binomial name
- Callichroma batesi Gahan, 1894

Synonyms
- Callichroma cosmicum Bates, 1872; Callichroma batesi Gahan, 1894; Callichroma cosmica Tristan, 1897

= Callichroma batesi =

Species of beetle

Callichroma batesi is a species of beetle in the family Cerambycidae. It was described by Gahan in 1894. It is known from Costa Rica and Nicaragua.
