= Chionothremma martyranthes =

Scientific classification
- Kingdom: Animalia
- Phylum: Arthropoda
- Class: Insecta
- Order: Lepidoptera
- Family: Tortricidae
- Genus: Chionothremma
- Species: C. martyranthes

Binomial name
- Chionothremma martyranthes (Meyrick, 1938)

Synonyms
- Tortrix martyranthes Meyrick, 1938

Species of moth

Chionothremma martyranthes is a species of moth of the family Tortricidae. It is found in New Guinea.
