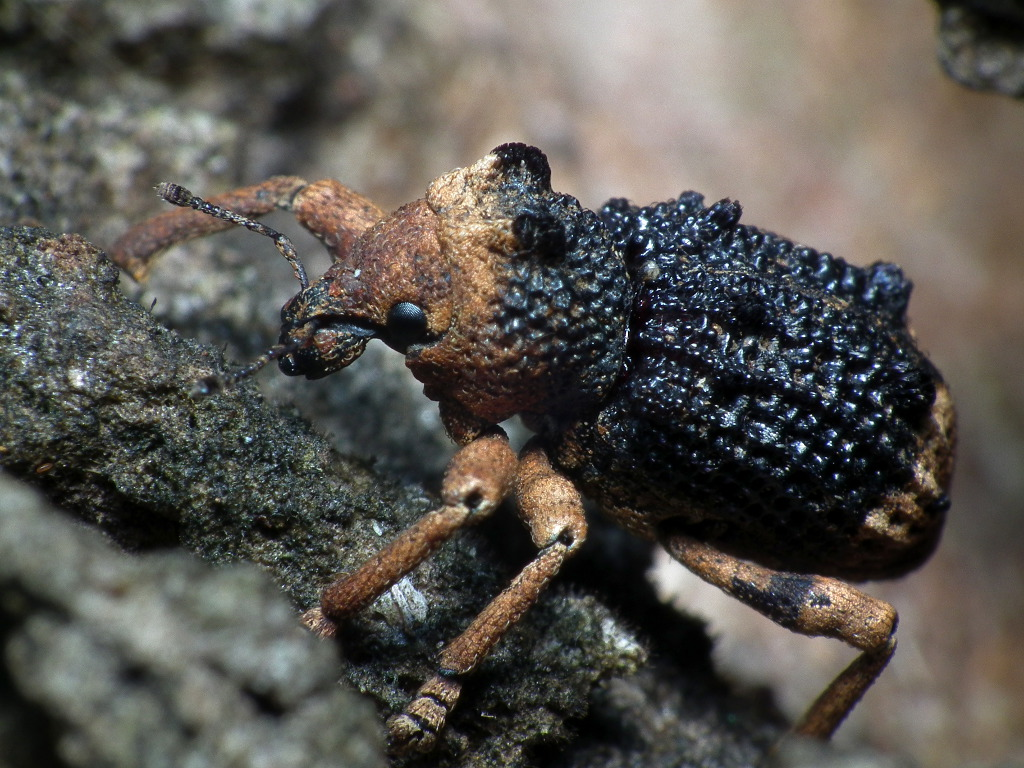
- Aades cultratus

Scientific classification
- Domain: Eukaryota
- Kingdom: Animalia
- Phylum: Arthropoda
- Class: Insecta
- Order: Coleoptera
- Suborder: Polyphaga
- Infraorder: Cucujiformia
- Family: Curculionidae
- Subfamily: Cyclominae
- Genus: Aades; Schoenherr (or Schönherr) 1823

Species
- See text

Synonyms
- See text

= Aades =

Genus of beetles

Aades is a genus of beetles in the family Curculionidae, commonly known as weevils. These insects are found in various parts of the world, including North and South America, Asia, and Europe. They are generally small in size, with most species measuring between 2 and 7 millimeters (0.079 and 0.276 in) in length.

== Biology ==
Aades are known for their elongated snouts, which they use to bore into plants and feed on the tissue inside. This can cause significant damage to crops, making them a major pest in agricultural settings. Some species of Aades are also known to feed on flowers and fruit, causing further damage to plants. The genus Aades contains over 100 described species, many of which are important agricultural pests.

Aades have a fairly simple life cycle, with most species undergoing complete metamorphosis. The eggs are laid on or near plants, and the larvae hatch and begin feeding on the plant tissue. As they grow, the larvae eventually pupate and emerge as adult Aardes. Adult aades can live for several months and typically mate and lay eggs multiple times during their lifespan.

== Pest status ==
Aades are major pests in agricultural settings, where they can cause significant damage to crops. This can lead to reduced yields and economic losses for farmers. They are also known to feed on flowers and fruit, causing further damage to plants.

== Control ==
Control of Aades can be challenging, as they have a high reproductive rate and can quickly become established in an area. Insecticides can be effective at controlling Aades, but they can also be harmful to other beneficial insects and the environment. Alternative control methods, such as physical removal of infested plants or the use of traps, may also be effective in managing their populations.

== Ecological importance ==
In addition to their economic importance as pests, Aades are also important indicators of ecosystem health. Many species of Aades are specialist feeders, meaning that they rely on a specific type of plant for food. As a result, changes in the abundance or distribution of these plants can have cascading effects on Aades populations. As such, they are often used as bioindicators to monitor the health of ecosystems and the impacts of human activities on the environment.

== Species ==
There are currently 4 species within this genus:

- Aades bicristatus (Schoenherr, 1823)
- Aades bifoveifrons (Lea, 1916); an infrasubspecies of Aades bifoveifrons is Aades foveipennis bifoveifrons or Aades foveipennis var. bifoveifrons
- Aades cultratus (Schoenherr, 1823)
- Aades franklini (Heller, K.M., 1925); which is also known under a different genus, Aterpus, as Aterpus franklini
