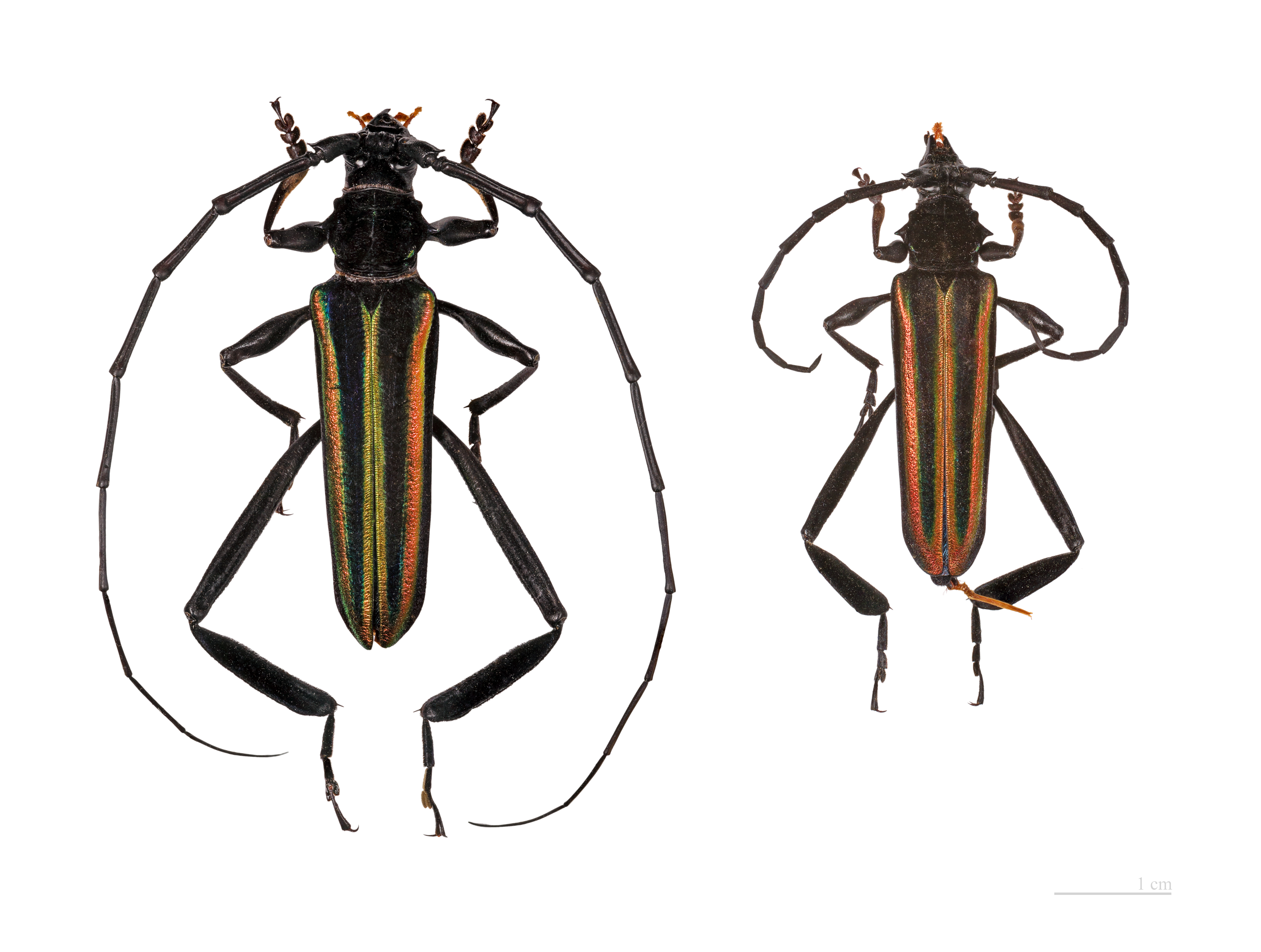
- Callichroma auricomum. Male and female

Scientific classification
- Kingdom: Animalia
- Phylum: Arthropoda
- Class: Insecta
- Order: Coleoptera
- Suborder: Polyphaga
- Infraorder: Cucujiformia
- Family: Cerambycidae
- Genus: Callichroma
- Species: C. auricomum

Binomial name
- Callichroma auricomum (Linnaeus, 1767)

Synonyms
- Cerambyx auricomus Linnaeus, 1767; Cerambyx suturalis Fabricius, 1781; Callichroma auricomum (Linnaeus, 1767); Callichroma suturale (Fabricius, 1781); Callichroma auricomum cyanescens Schmidt, 1924; Callichroma auricomum rubescens Schmidt, 1924; Callichroma auricomum viridescens Schmidt, 1924 (Preocc.)

= Callichroma auricomum =

Species of beetle

Callichroma auricomum is a species of Callichroma in the family Cerambycidae.

== Description ==
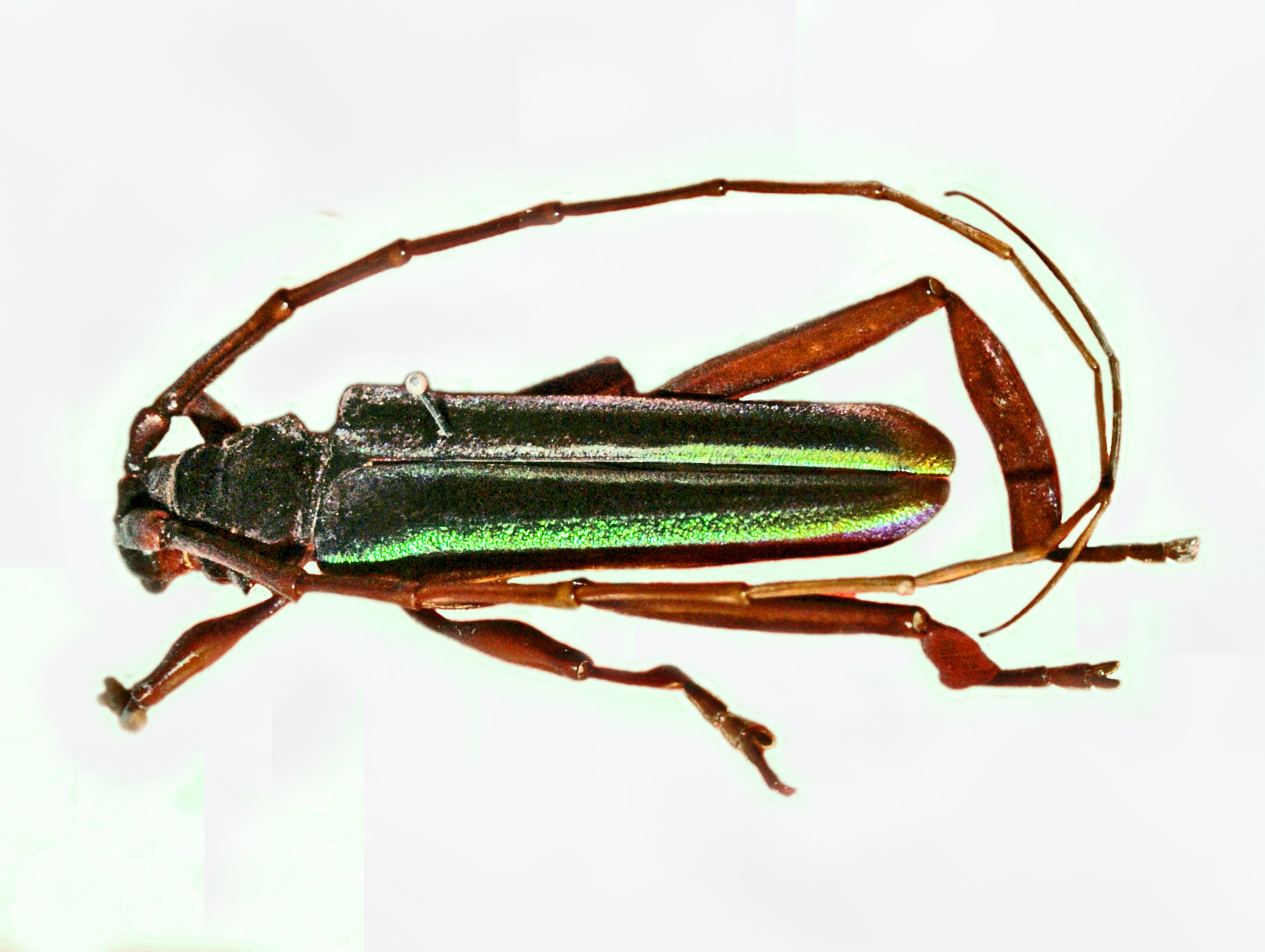
Male of Callichroma auricomum. Mounted specimen on display at the Museo Civico di Storia Naturale di Milano

Callichroma auricomum can reach a length of 45–47 millimetres (1.8–1.9 in). This longhorn is characterized by well-developed hind legs. Elytra show a black and metallic green or bronze coloration.

== Distribution ==
This species can be found in Colombia, Ecuador, Peru, Brazil, Guiana, Suriname, French Guiana and Bolivia.

== Bibliography ==
- Napp D.S. & Martins U.R. 2005: Homonymies in Callichromatini (Coleoptera, Cerambycidae). Revista Brasileira de Entomologia, 49(3).
- Demets Yolande 1976: Notes sur les Callichromatini (Coleoptera, Cerambycidae), IV. Étude préliminaire des genres Schwarzerion Schmidt, 1924 et Xenochroma Schmidt, 1924. Papéis Avulsos de Zoologia, São Paulo, 29 (17): 121-140, 29 figs.
