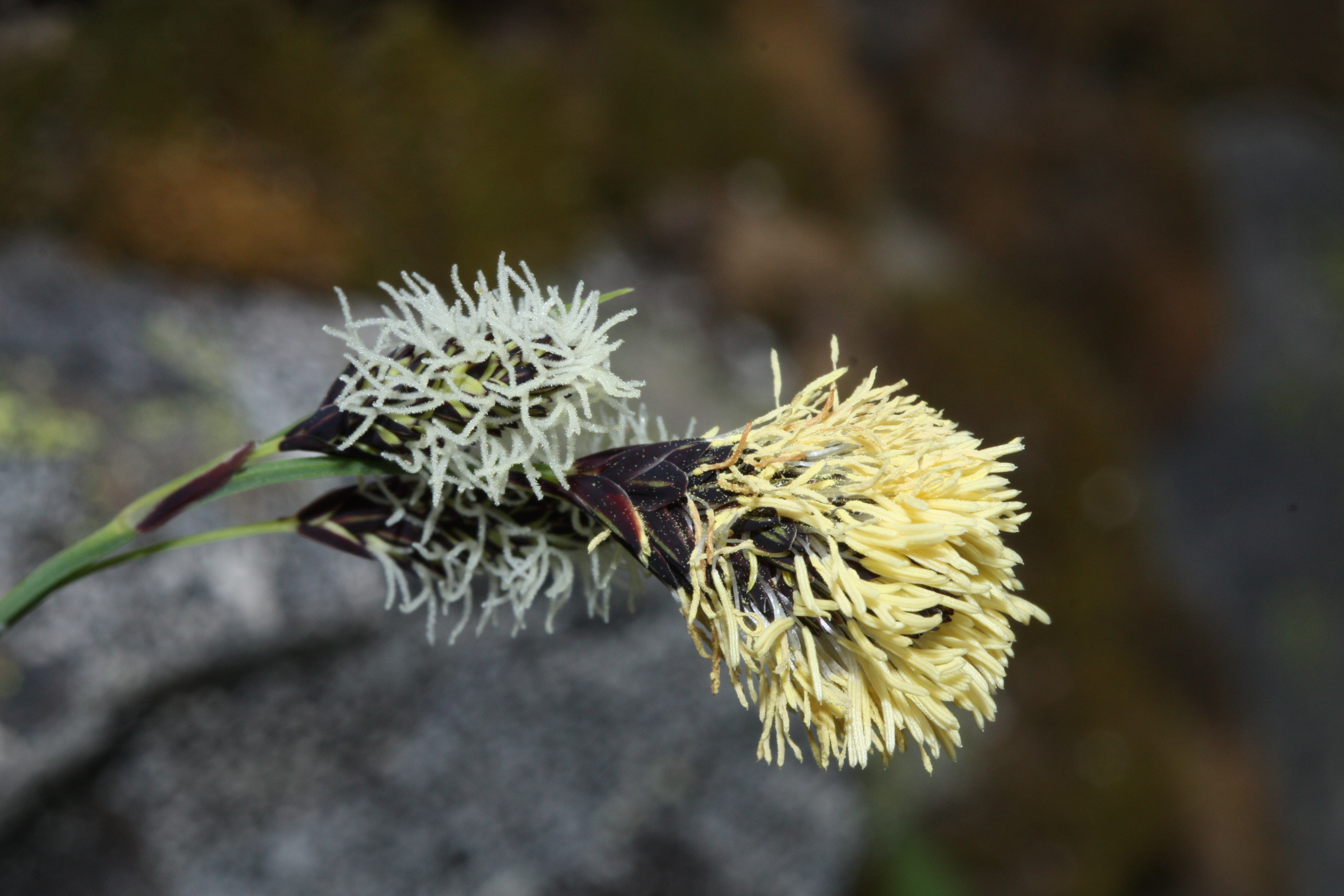

Scientific classification
- Kingdom: Plantae
- Clade: Tracheophytes
- Clade: Angiosperms
- Clade: Monocots
- Clade: Commelinids
- Order: Poales
- Family: Cyperaceae
- Genus: Carex
- Species: C. spectabilis

Binomial name
- Carex spectabilis Dewey

Synonyms
- Carex invisa L.H.Bailey; Carex melastoma Fisch.; Carex melastoma Fisch. ex Boott; Carex nigella Boott; Carex spectabilis f. alpina Holm; Carex spectabilis f. chrysantha Holm; Carex spectabilis var. elegantula Holm; Carex spectabilis var. gelida Holm; Carex spectabilis var. superba Holm; Carex tolmiei Boott; Carex tolmiei var. invisa (L.H.Bailey) Kük.; Carex tolmiei var. nigella (Boott) Kük.; Carex tolmiei var. nigella (Boott) L.H.Bailey

= Carex spectabilis =

Species of grass-like plant

Carex spectabilis is a species of sedge known by the common name showy sedge.

== Description ==
Carex spectabilis produces clusters of stems 50 to 90 centimeters in maximum height, sometimes from rhizomes. The inflorescence is an erect to heavily nodding cluster of flowers covered in dark purplish scales. The fruit is coated in a perigynium which is pale yellowish to dark purple to black.

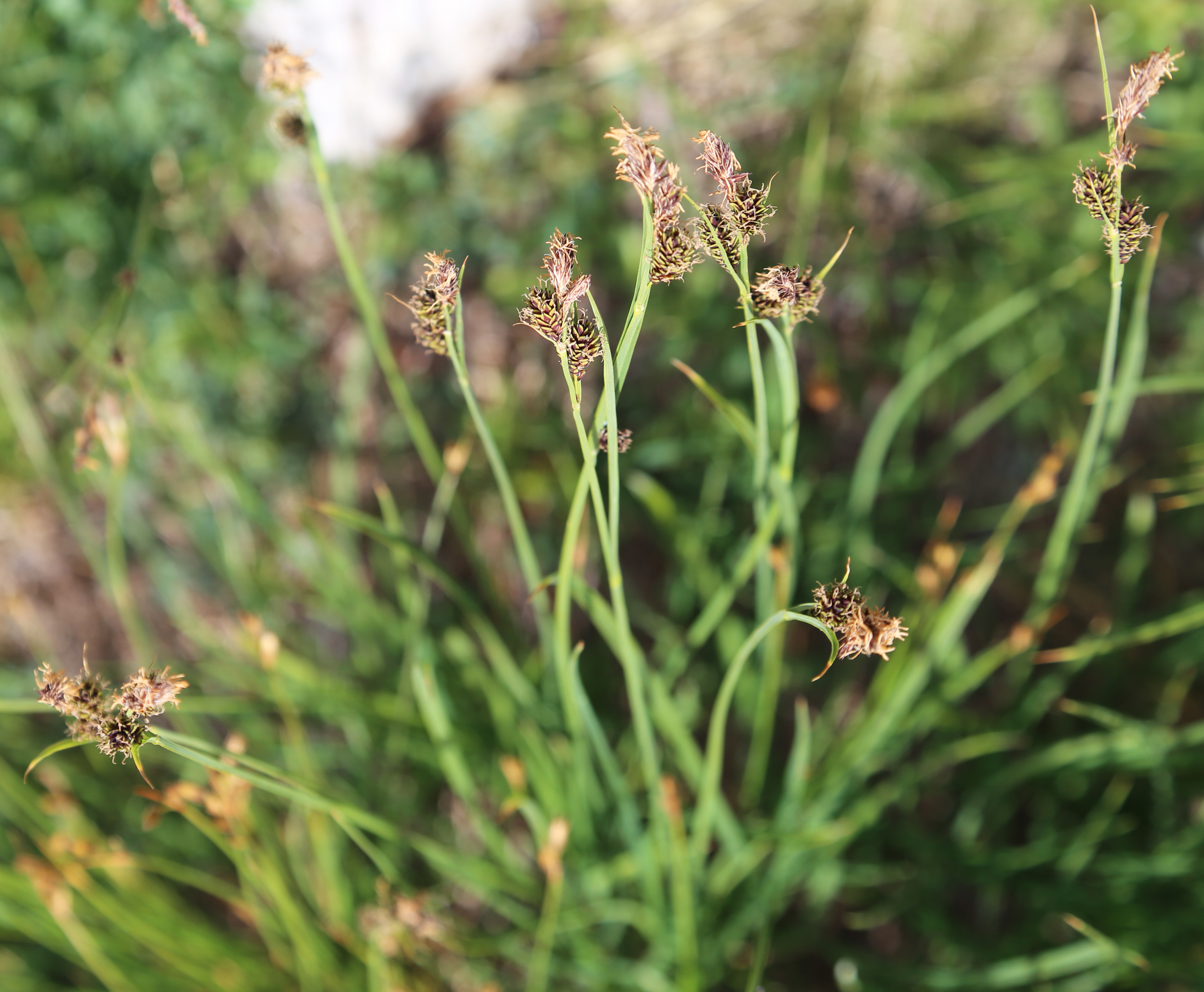
Carex spectabilis clump at 11,000 ft (3,400 m)

== Distribution ==
This sedge is native to northwestern North America from Alaska to the Northwestern United States, and in California and Utah. Carex spectabilis grows in moist mountain habitat in subalpine to alpine climates.
