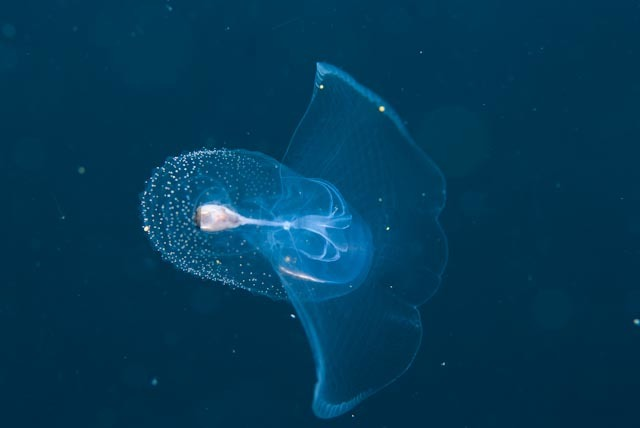

Scientific classification
- Domain: Eukaryota
- Kingdom: Animalia
- Phylum: Mollusca
- Class: Gastropoda
- Clade: Euopisthobranchia
- Order: Pteropoda
- Family: Cymbuliidae
- Genus: Corolla
- Species: C. spectabilis

Binomial name
- Corolla spectabilis (Dall, 1871)

Synonyms
- Cymbuliopsis spectabilis

= Corolla spectabilis =

Spectacular corolla

Species of gastropod

Corolla spectabilis, common name: spectacular corolla, is a species of sea butterfly, a floating and swimming sea snail in the family Cymbuliidae.

== Distribution ==
This species is oceanic and has been recorded in European waters, the Gulf of Mexico, and off the coast of Florida, California, Bermuda, Venezuela and Brazil.

== Description ==
The overall length of adults of this sea butterfly is 40 millimetres (1.6 in).
