= Corolla (gastropod) =

Scientific classification
- Kingdom: Animalia
- Phylum: Mollusca
- Class: Gastropoda
- Clade: Euopisthobranchia
- Order: Pteropoda
- Family: Cymbuliidae
- Subfamily: Glebinae
- Genus: Corolla; Dall, 1871

Type species
- Corolla spectabilis Dall, 1871

Species
- See text

Synonyms
- Cymbuliopsis Pelseneer, 1887

Genus of gastropods

Corolla is a genus of pelagic "sea butterflies". These are holoplanktonic opisthobranch molluscs belonging to the family Cymbuliidae. They are preyed upon by the gymnosome pteropods of the genus Cliopsis.

== Species ==
Species within this genus include:

- Corolla calceola (A. E. Verrill, 1880) -- Atlantic corolla
  - Distribution: Oceanic
  - Length: 40 mm
- Corolla chrysosticta (Troschel, 1854)
- Corolla cupula Rampal, 1996
- Corolla intermedia (Tesch, 1903)
  - Distribution: Florida, Oceanic
  - Length: 39 mm
- Corolla ovata Quoy & Gaimard, 1832
  - Distribution: Florida, Bermuda, Oceanic
  - Length: 40 mm
- Corolla spectabilis (Dall, 1871) Spectacular corolla
