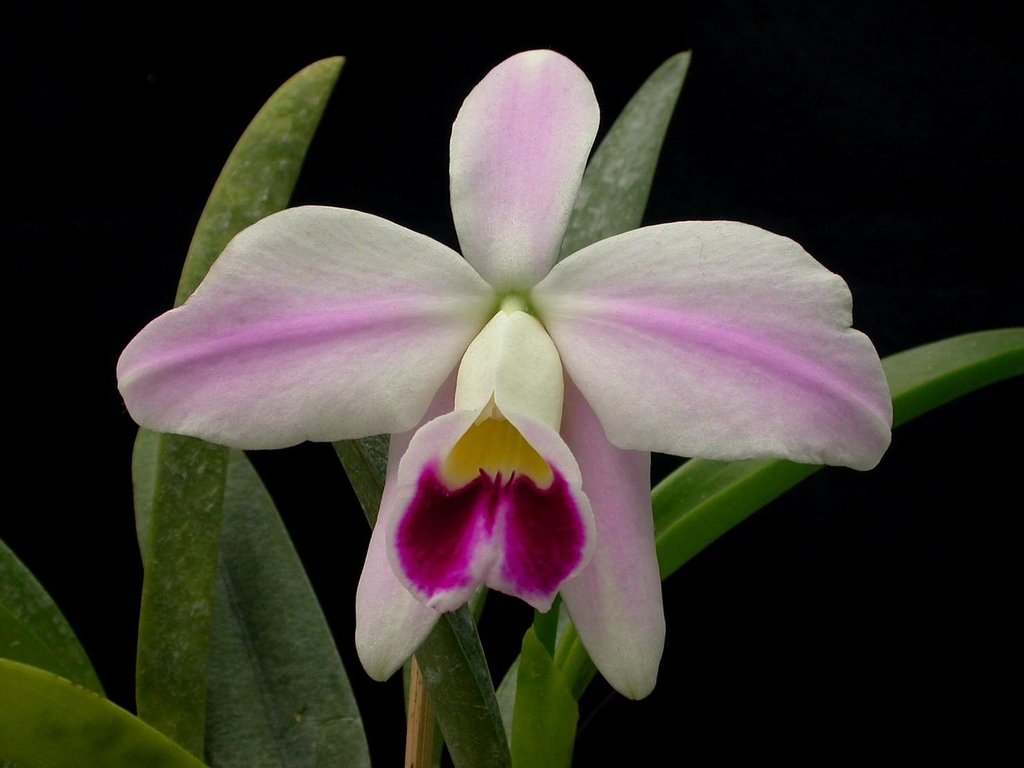
- Sophronitis pumila flower

Scientific classification
- Kingdom: Plantae
- Clade: Tracheophytes
- Clade: Angiosperms
- Clade: Monocots
- Order: Asparagales
- Family: Orchidaceae
- Subfamily: Epidendroideae
- Genus: Cattleya
- Subgenus: Cattleya subg. Cattleya
- Section: Cattleya sect. Crispae
- Species: C. pumila

Binomial name
- Cattleya pumila (Hook.) Van den Berg & M.W.Chase

Synonyms
- Cattleya pumila Hook.; Cattleya marginata Paxton; Cattleya spectabilis Paxton; Cattleya pinellii Lindl.; Laelia pumila (Hook.) Rchb.f.; Cattleya pumila var. major Lem.; Bletia pumila (Hook.) Rchb.f.; Laelia pumila var. mirabilis E.Morren; Laelia spectabilis (Paxton) Withner; Hadrolaelia pumila (Hook.) Chiron & V.P.Castro

= Cattleya pumila =

Dwarf sophronitis

Species of orchid

Cattleya pumila, commonly known as the dwarf sophronitis, is a species of orchid endemic to southeastern and southern Brazil.
