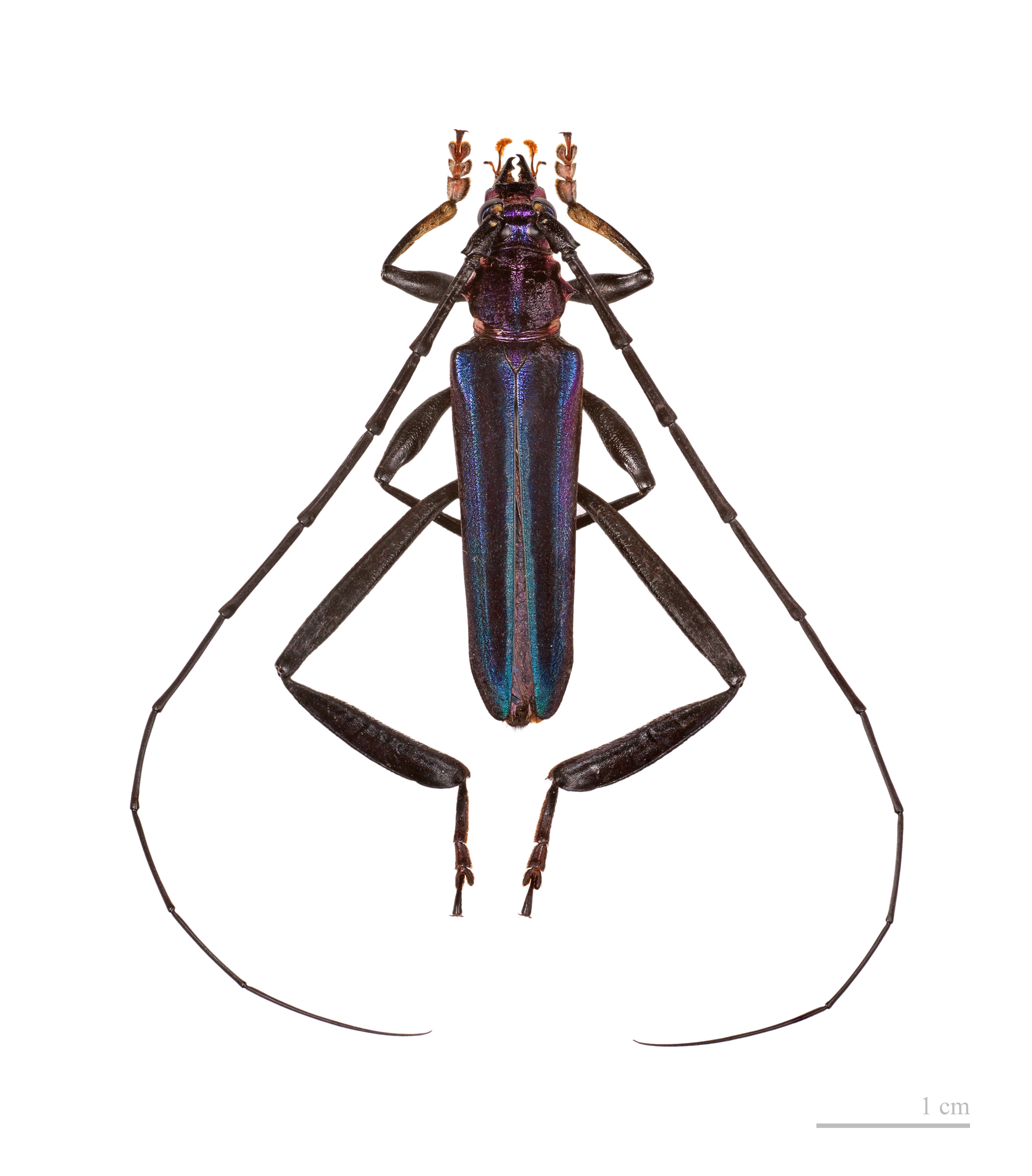

Scientific classification
- Domain: Eukaryota
- Kingdom: Animalia
- Phylum: Arthropoda
- Class: Insecta
- Order: Coleoptera
- Suborder: Polyphaga
- Infraorder: Cucujiformia
- Family: Cerambycidae
- Genus: Callichroma
- Species: C. velutinum

Binomial name
- Callichroma velutinum (Fabricius, 1775)

Synonyms
- Cerambyx velutinus Fabricius, 1775; Cerambyx spectabilis Voet, 1781 (Unav.); Callichroma porphyrogenitum Bates, 1870; Callichroma nigricans Aurivillius, 1909

= Callichroma velutinum =

Species of beetle

Callichroma velutinum is a species of beetle in the family Cerambycidae. It was described by Johan Christian Fabricius in 1775. It is known from Venezuela, the Guianas, central Brazil, the West Indies, Peru, and Bolivia.
