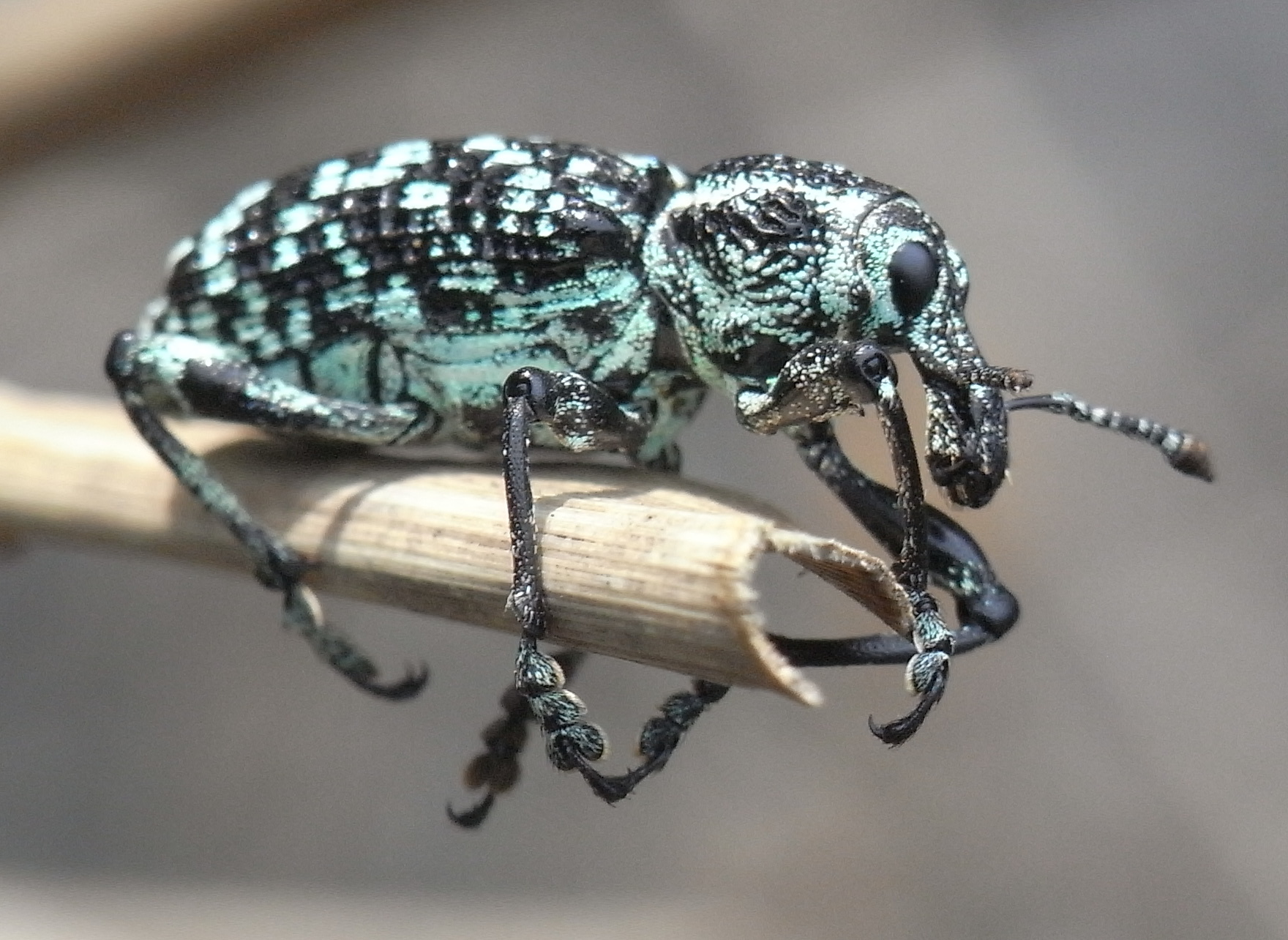

Scientific classification
- Kingdom: Animalia
- Phylum: Arthropoda
- Clade: Pancrustacea
- Class: Insecta
- Order: Coleoptera
- Suborder: Polyphaga
- Infraorder: Cucujiformia
- Family: Curculionidae
- Genus: Chrysolopus
- Species: C. spectabilis

Binomial name
- Chrysolopus spectabilis (Fabricius, 1775)
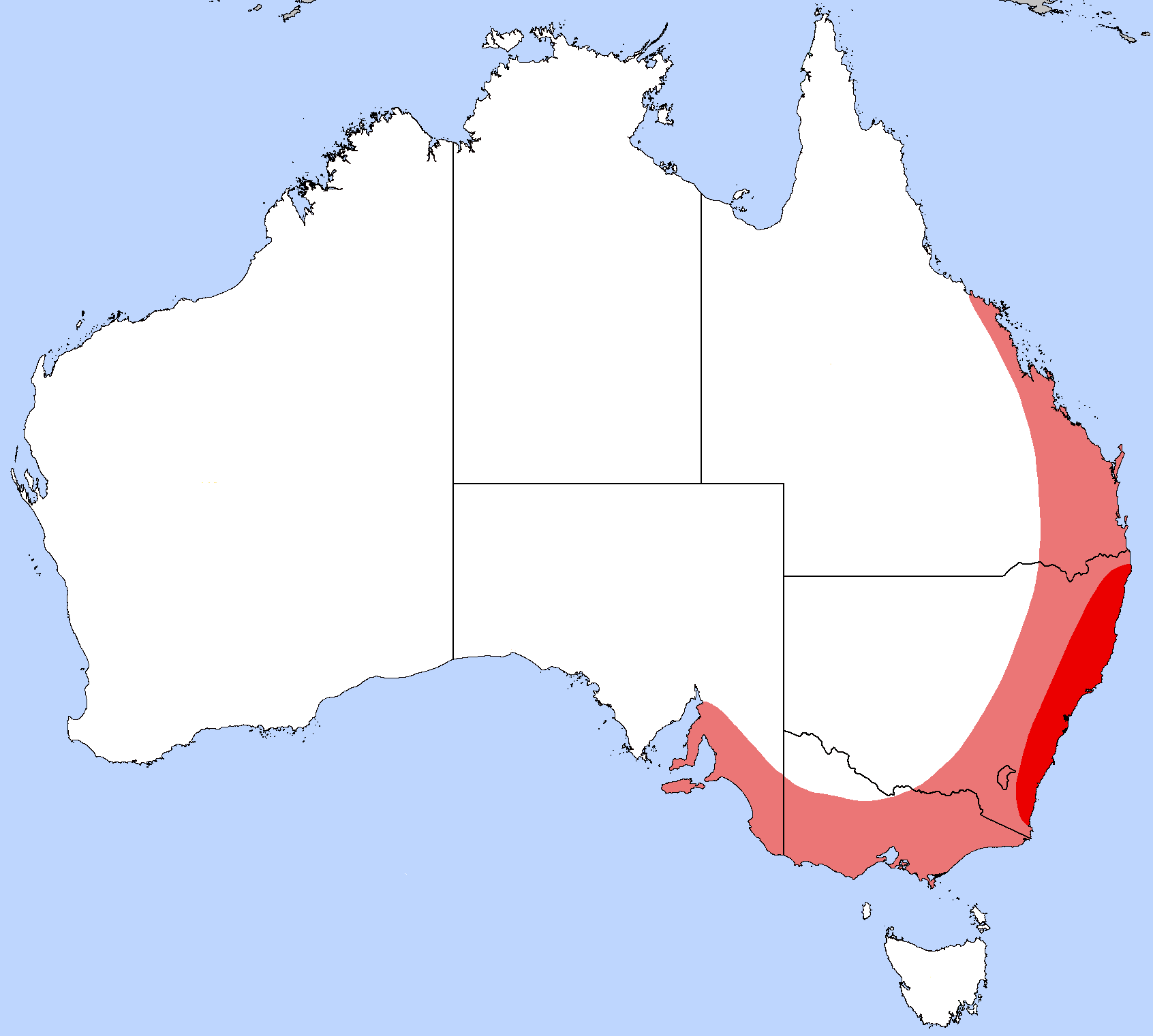
- Distribution: dark red – core range; light red – peripheral range

= Chrysolopus spectabilis =

Species of beetle

Chrysolopus spectabilis (common names include Botany Bay diamond weevil, Botany Bay diamond beetle and sapphire weevil) is a species of weevil found in south-eastern Australia. It was discovered during James Cook's first voyage, and became one of the first insects to be described from Australia. The weevil measures up to 25 mm (1.0 in) long and includes distinctive metallic green and black scales. It feeds only on 28 species of the plant genus Acacia.

== Taxonomy ==
Chrysolopus spectabilis was first described in 1775 by the Danish entomologist Johan Christian Fabricius, in his work Systema Entomologiae, making it one of the first insects to be described from Australia. Fabricius named the species Curculio spectabilis, where the specific epithet spectabilis translates as "remarkable" or "admirable". Fabricius would have had ample opportunity on visits to London in the previous years to examine the insect collections from Cook's expeditions. Fabricius' species was transferred in 1817 by Ernst Friedrich Germar to the genus Chrysolopus, and so reached its current scientific name. Since then, other species have been added to the genus, which now contains 11 species, all native to Oceania. The colouration of the various species varies widely from green to black.

== Discovery ==
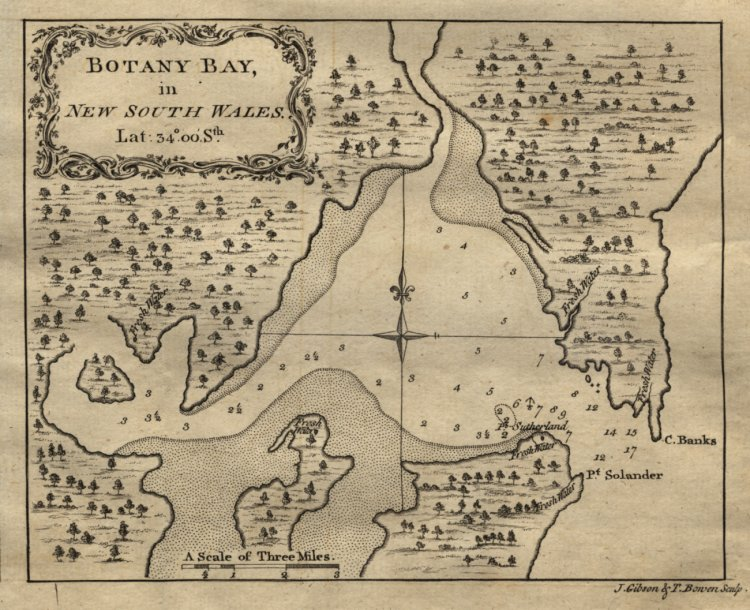
Map from 1773 of Botany Bay, showing the landing site of HMS Endeavour at Point Sutherland

The earliest specimen of Chrysolopus spectabilis to be collected was caught by Joseph Banks and Daniel Solander at some time between April and August 1770, as part of James Cook's first voyage to the south seas. It was one of only five insects collected by that expedition, the others being a butterfly, the ant Myrmecia gulosa, and two flies. Banks summarised the Australian insect fauna thus: "Of insects here were but few sorts and among them only the ants were troublesome to us".

The insect collections were not otherwise mentioned in the logs of the Endeavour expedition, and the locations where they were collected are open to speculation. Despite variations on the name "Botany Bay weevil", it was probably not collected in the vicinity of Botany Bay, since it is typically too cold and wet there in April. It is more likely that it was collected in the warm, dry surroundings of Cooktown, Queensland, which the expedition visited that August. After the colonisation of Australia in 1788, the species was frequently encountered in the summer months in the environs of Sydney, explaining the common names.

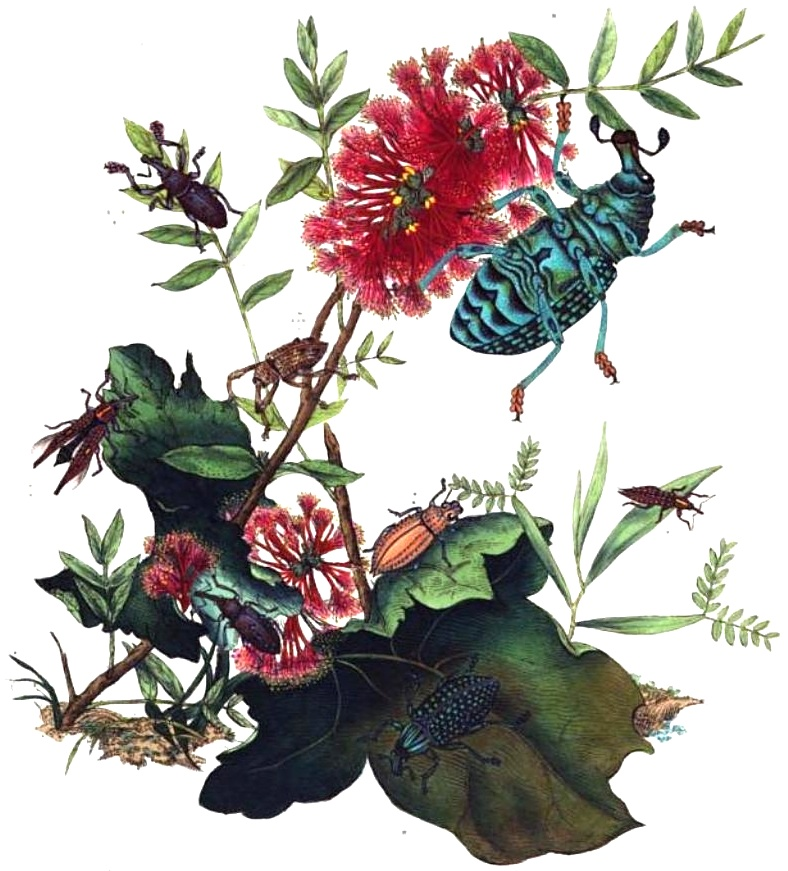
Illustration from 1805, showing the C. spectabilis (top right) and the Brazilian Entimus imperialis (bottom middle).

The common name "diamond weevil" was coined in 1805 by Edward Donovan. It is based on the name of the Brazilian species Entimus imperialis, which was known as the "diamond beetle", since the two species had similar colouration, and the diamond beetle was already well known in Europe. The two species are not closely related.

In the years following its discovery, "Curculio spectabilis" was a valued item for collections, due to its unusual appearance. The type specimen from the Endeavour expedition now forms part of the Banks Collection at the Natural History Museum in London. It is in good condition, although its legs are missing most of their tarsi.

== Description ==
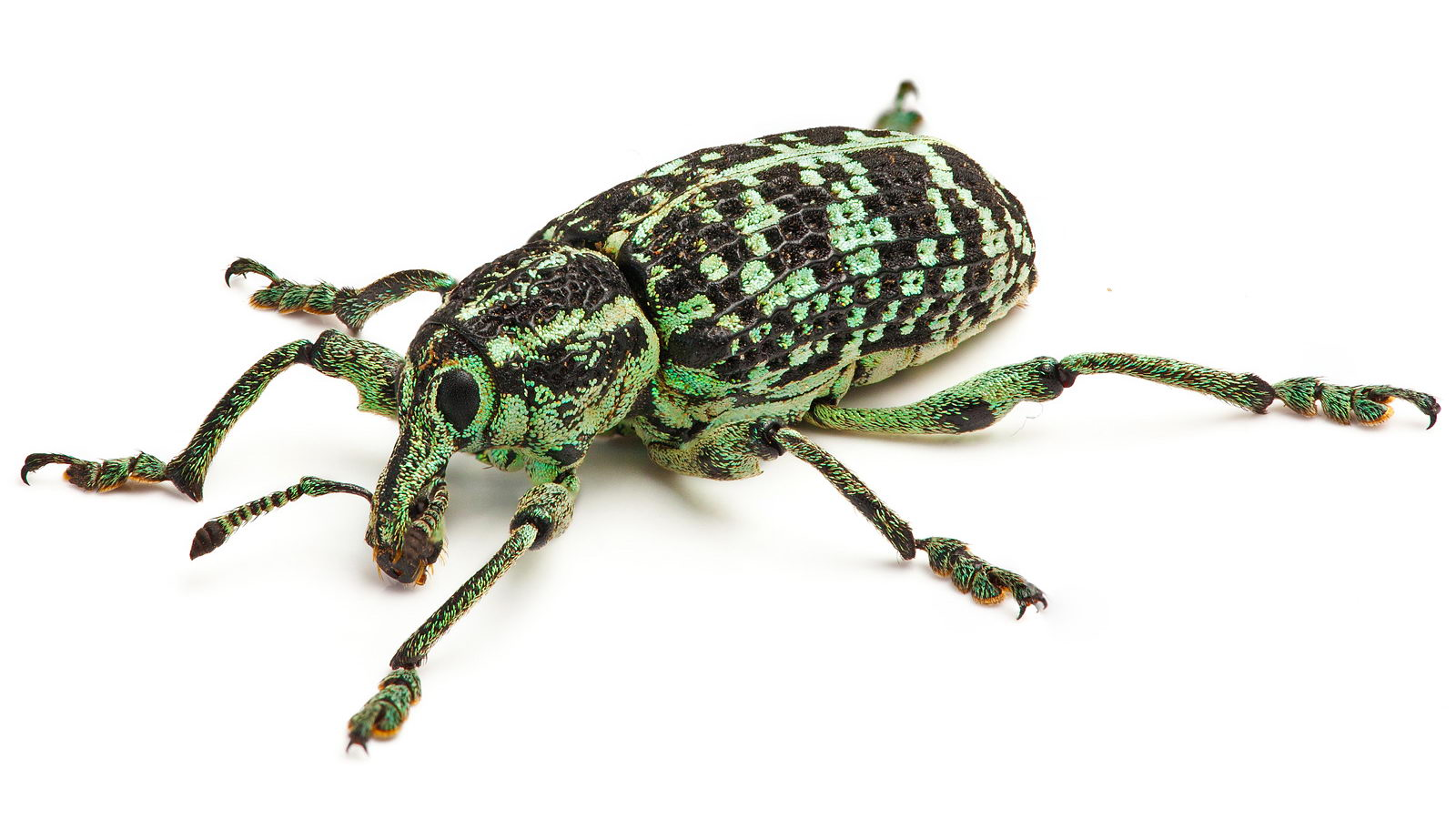
Adult on white

The body of Chrysolopus spectabilis is an elongated oval 15–25 millimetres (0.6–1.0 in) long. The elytra are black, with irregular spots of bright metallic green. The underside of the body is shaded in matt green, and a white or green line runs the length of the animal's sides. The head, thorax and legs are black with occasional metallic green markings. The colouration varies across the year, with animals emerging later in the season having a bluer colour.

The snout is about as long as the bell-shaped pronotum, and strongly curved. The geniculate antennae arise from halfway along the snout, and end in a small club. The compound eyes protrude slightly. The elytra display a row of furrows with slight depressions, and the animal's ventral side is also covered with scales. The powerful legs have a thick covering of hair on the tarsi, which have no claws.

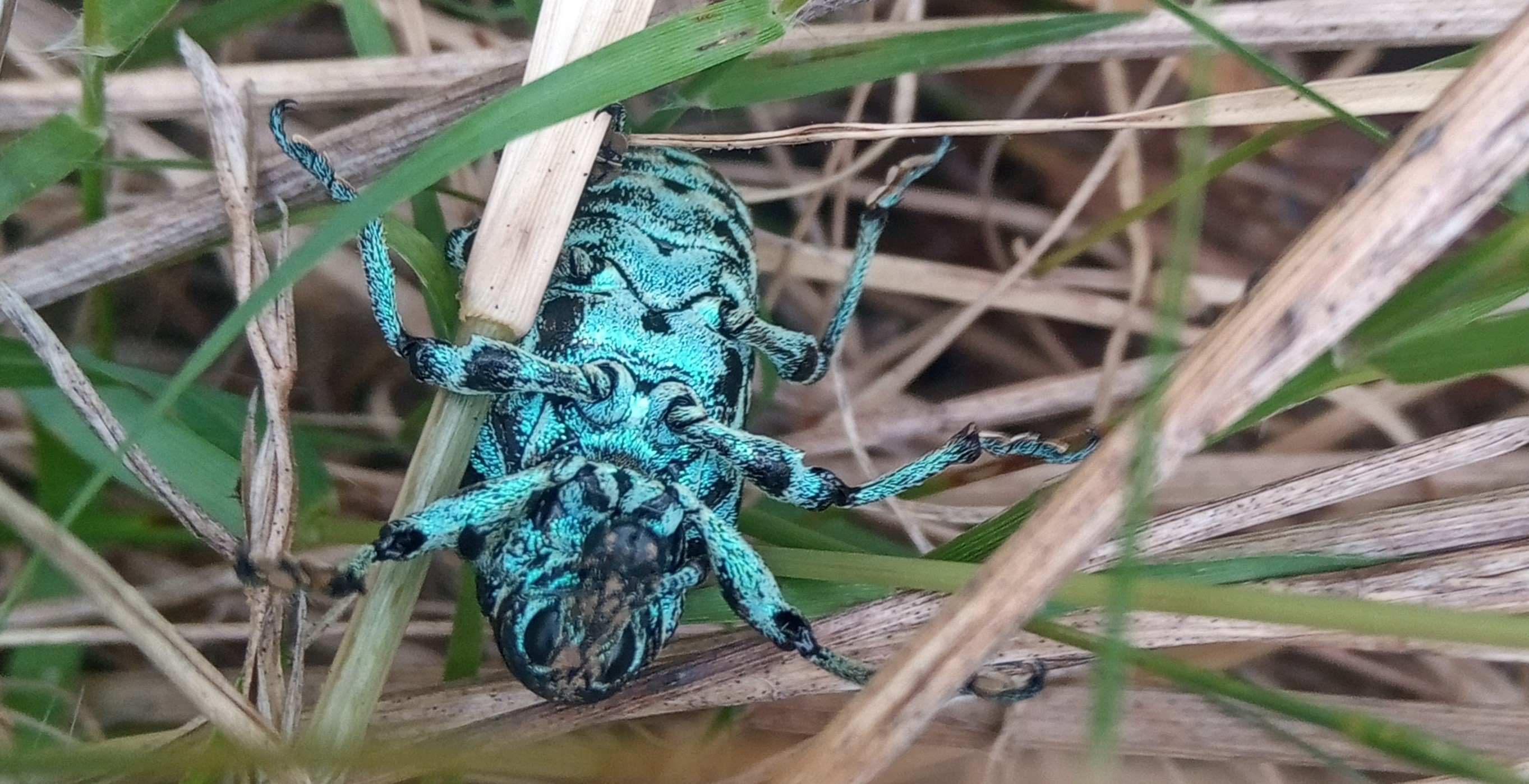
Underside of adult - near Werrington creek, Sydney 2022

The larvae are 40–50 mm (1.6–2.0 in) long; they are white, round and wrinkled, with a few hairs on their sides, and a red–brown head with black mandibles. To date, the pupa has not been described.

== Distribution and habitat ==
Chrysolopus spectabilis occurs in the eastern and southern states of Australia, with a range stretching from the coastal region of Queensland to Victoria and eastern parts of South Australia. It is most common in eastern parts of New South Wales, particularly the surroundings of Sydney, and out to the foothills of the Great Dividing Range.

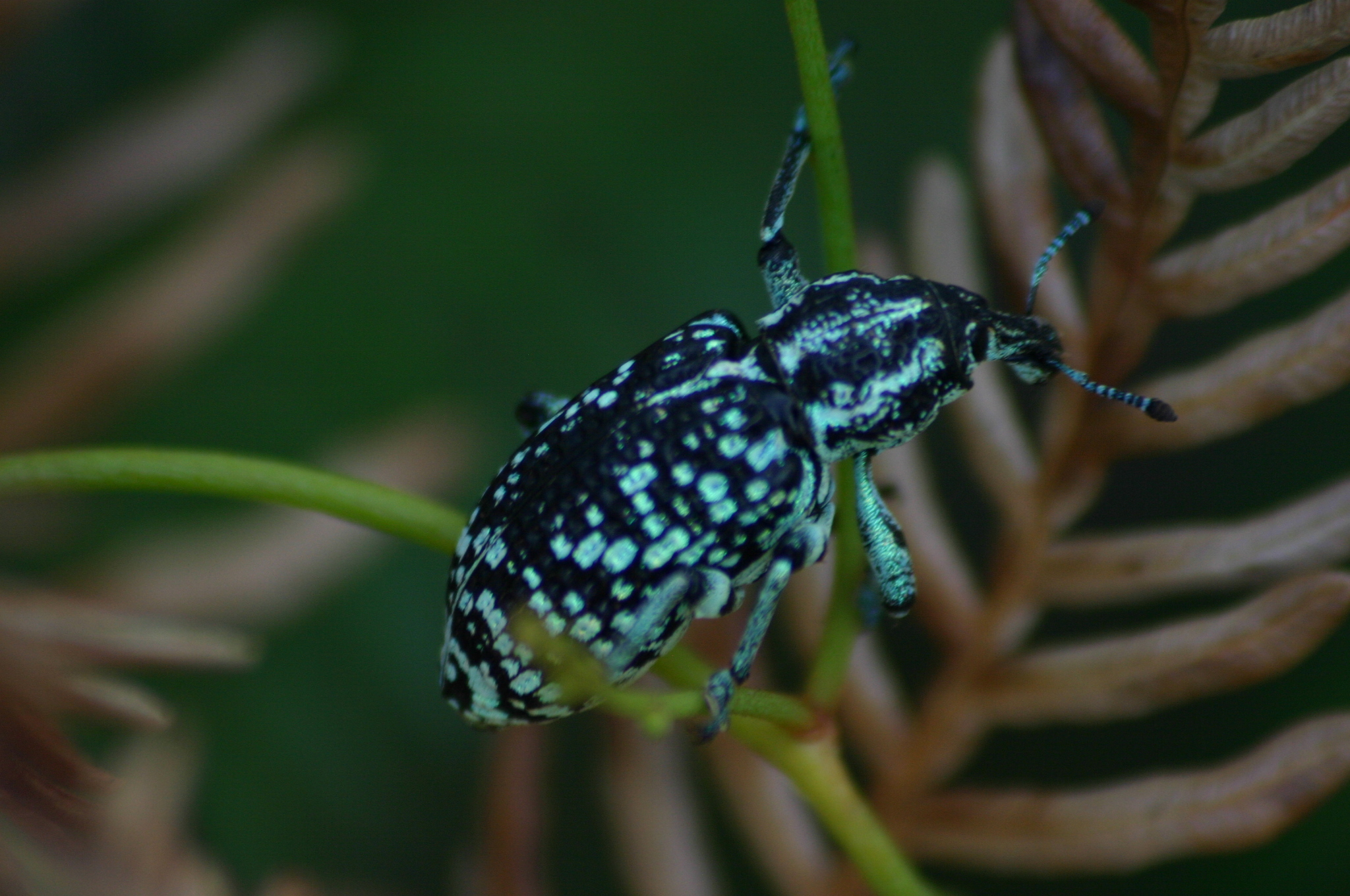
Adult

Adults are active both in daytime and at night, mostly during the warmer months (November–March). During this period, C. spectabilis is often seen in built-up areas and woodlands in areas with moderate precipitation, particularly around Acacia plants. In open areas, such as northern New South Wales, Acacia species with phyllodia (flattened leaf petioles) are preferred, but in more wooded areas, such as the Blue Mountains, species with paripinnate leaves are preferred. Adult beetles have been recorded on 28 Acacia species, out of the 1000 species present in Australia; the larvae, on the other hand, have only been recorded on seven species. The larvae are, however, thought to feed on the same species as the adults.

== Life cycle ==
Development of the beetles to the adult state usually takes less than a year. Females bore up to 20 small holes close to each other in the stem of the Acacia plant, immediately above the soil level, and lay a single egg into each hole. After hatching, the grubs bore deeper into one of the plant's main roots. The imagines (adults) emerge in the spring in the more southerly latitudes, but can emerge throughout the year in the subtropical parts. They bore their way out of the plant, leaving the empty pupal case behind.

== Ecology ==
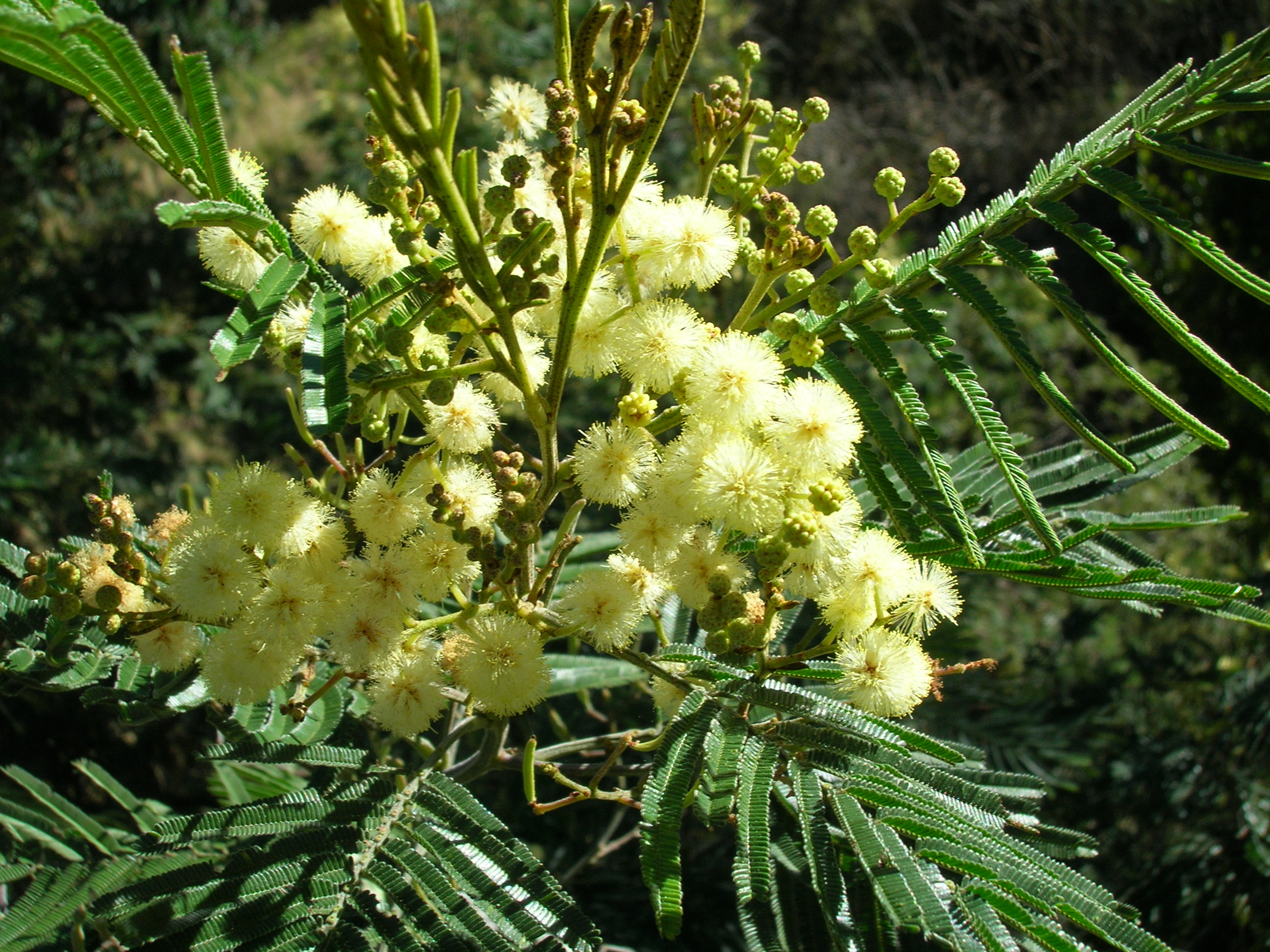
Acacia mearnsii, one of the 28 Acacia species which C. spectabilis feeds on.

Chrysolopus spectabilis feeds almost exclusively on particular species of Acacia, including the Cootamundra wattle Acacia baileyana, the silver wattle Acacia dealbata, the Australian blackwood Acacia melanoxylon and the golden wattle Acacia longifolia. The beetles choose young plants, around 50–150 cm (20–59 in) tall, before they have flowered. They use the long snout and powerful mouthparts to make holes in the stem and leaves, in order to reach the sap and to build egg chambers.

In south-eastern Australia, C. spectabilis can be a pest of acacia plantations. Adults can destroy new shoots, and the larvae can limit the plant's water uptake. The adults can even cause a tree to die through ring barking. Despite its garish colours, C. spectabilis is not poisonous. It is very alert, and if it senses danger, will either fall to the ground and play dead, or hold fast to the plant with its legs.
