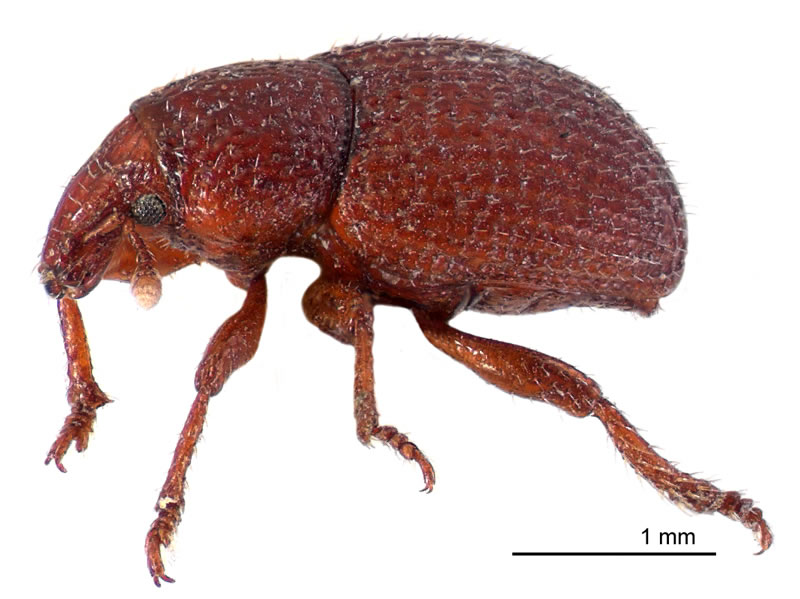
- Aphela algarum

Scientific classification
- Kingdom: Animalia
- Phylum: Arthropoda
- Class: Insecta
- Order: Coleoptera
- Suborder: Polyphaga
- Infraorder: Cucujiformia
- Family: Curculionidae
- Subfamily: Cyclominae; Schoenherr, 1826

= Cyclominae =

Subfamily of beetles

Cyclominae is a subfamily of weevils.

== Tribes ==
From Oberprieler (2010)

- Amycterini
- Aterpini
- Cyclomini
- Dichotrachelini
- Hipporhinini
- Listroderini
- Notiomimetini
- Rhythirrinini
