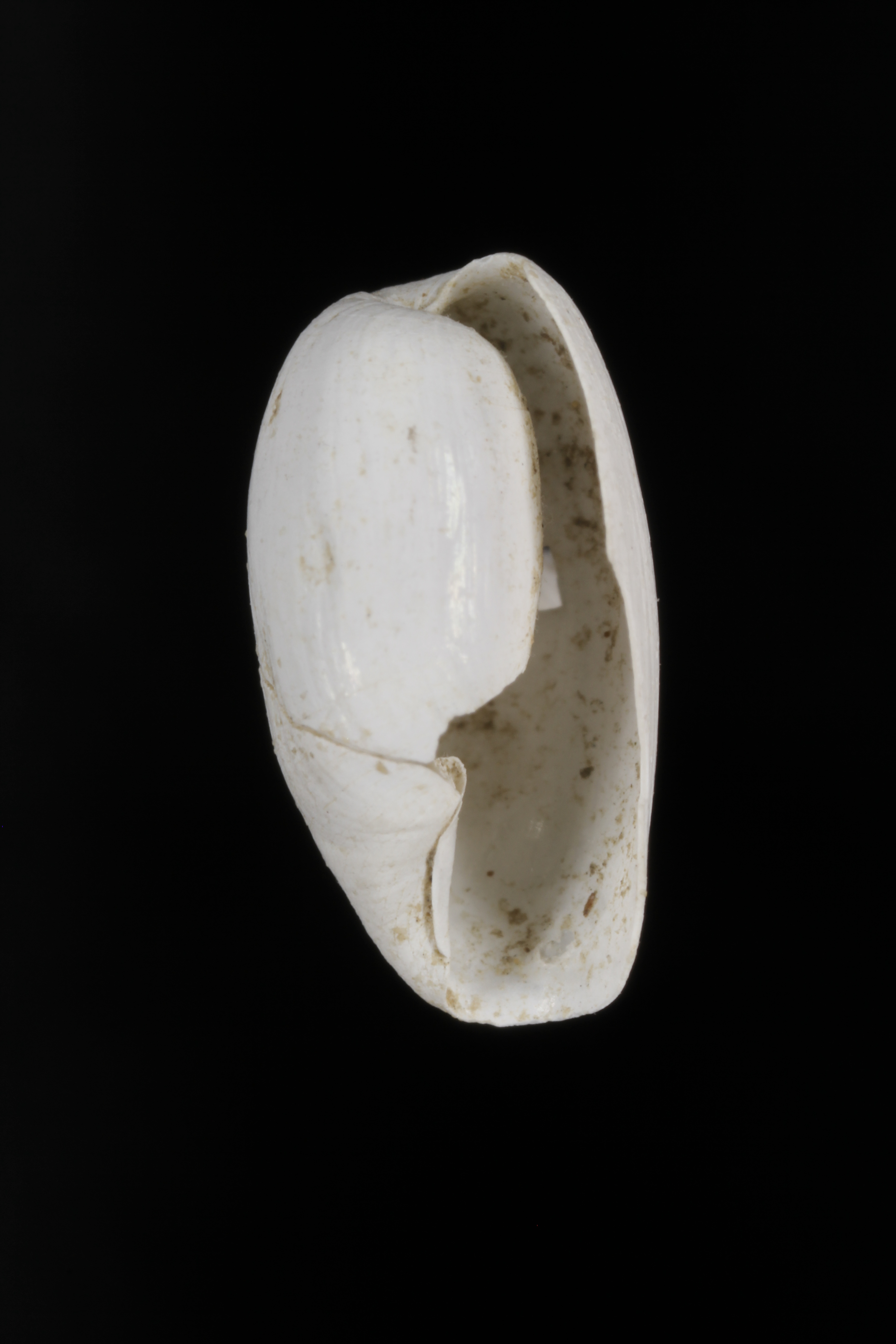
- Shell of Cylichnella takekosugei (holotype at MNHN, Paris)

Scientific classification
- Kingdom: Animalia
- Phylum: Mollusca
- Class: Gastropoda
- Order: Cephalaspidea
- Superfamily: Cylichnoidea
- Family: Cylichnidae
- Genus: Cylichnella; Gabb, 1873

Type species
- Bulla bidentata d'Orbigny, 1841

Synonyms
- Cychlinella [sic] (misspelling); Cylichlinella [sic] (misspelling)

= Cylichnella =

Genus of molluscs

Cylichnella is a genus of sea snails or bubble snails, marine gastropod molluscs in the family Cylichnidae, the "chalice bubble snails".

== Species ==
- Cylichnella agulhasensis (Thiele, 1925)
- Cylichnella bidentata (d'Orbigny, 1841)
- Cylichnella defuncta F. Baker & Hanna, 1927
- † Cylichnella duqmensis Harzhauser, 2007
- Cylichnella gonzagensis (F. Baker & Hanna, 1927)
- Cylichnella goslineri Valdés & Camacho-Garcia, 2004
- Cylichnella oryza (Totten, 1835)
- Cylichnella takekosugei Thach, 2020

Taxa inquirenda

- Cylichnella meridionalis (E.A. Smith, 1902)
- Cylichnella minuscula (W. H. Turton, 1932)

Species brought into synonymy

- Subgenus Cylichnella (Bullinella) Newton, 1891: synonym of Cylichna Lovén, 1846
- Cylichnella (Bullinella) diegensis Dall, 1919: synonym of Cylichna diegensis (Dall, 1919) (basionym)

Subgenus Cylichnella (Cylichnium) Dall, 1908: synonym of Cylichnium Dall, 1908 (original rank)

- Cylichnella bistriata Tomlin, 1920: synonym of Cylichna bistriata (Tomlin, 1920) (original combination)
- Cylichnella diegensis Dall, 1919: synonym of Cylichna diegensis (Dall, 1919) (original combination)
- Cylichnella nitens (E. A. Smith, 1872): synonym of Cylichna nitens E. A. Smith, 1872
- Cylichnella rolleri (Ev. Marcus, 1977): synonym of Acteocina culcitella (Gould, 1853)
- † Cylichnella soror Suter, 1917: synonym of † Retusa soror (Suter, 1917) (original combination)
