= Diaphanoidea =

Scientific classification
- Domain: Eukaryota
- Kingdom: Animalia
- Phylum: Mollusca
- Class: Gastropoda
- Order: Cephalaspidea
- Superfamily: Diaphanoidea

Families
- See text.

Superfamily of gastropods

Diaphanoidea is a taxonomic superfamily of small sea snails, marine opisthobranch gastropod mollusks or micromollusks in the Cephalaspidea, the headshield slugs and bubble snails.

Species in this superfamily have small, flimsy, almost globular shells, known as paper bubble gastropod shells.

This superfamily is not monophyletic.

== Distribution ==
Species in this superfamily are found in cold seas, such as the Arctic region, Antarctica, Australia, and New Zealand.

== Habitat ==
The species occur in the sublittoral to abyssal zones.

== Shell description ==
The shell is minute, thin, fragile, colorless to translucent, and usually less than 5 mm in size. The overall shape is ovate, pear-shaped, and bulbous. There is a sunken apex.

== Families ==
Families in the superfamily Diaphanoidea include:

- Colinatydidae Oskars, Bouchet, and Malaquias, 2015
- Cylichnidae H. Adams & A. Adams, 1854
- Diaphanidae Odhner, 1922
- Mnestiidae Oskars, Bouchet, and Malaquias, 2015
- Notodiaphanidae Thiele, 1931 (taxon inquirendum)
