= Toledonia bullata =

Scientific classification
- Kingdom: Animalia
- Phylum: Mollusca
- Class: Gastropoda
- Order: Cephalaspidea
- Superfamily: Cylichnoidea
- Family: Cylichnidae
- Genus: Toledonia
- Species: T. bullata

Binomial name
- Toledonia bullata (A. Gould, 1847)
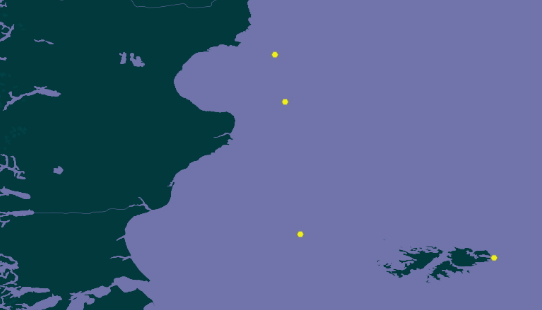

Synonyms
- Actaeona bullatus A. Gould, 1847; Tornatella bullata A. Gould, 1847 (original combination)

Species of gastropod

Toledonia bullata is a species of sea snail, a marine gastropod mollusk in the family Ringiculidae.

== Description ==
The length of the shell attains 6.25 mm, its diameter 4.16 mm.

The small shell is thin, smooth, whitish and covered with a most delicate straw colored epidermis. The whole surface is marked with regularly arranged, deep, linear, revolving grooves, of which there are about five on the upper whorls, and about sixteen on the body whorl. In some parts the furrows seem to be crossed by delicate bars. The interspaces are flat. There are five whorls, which have a distinct, square shoulder; the body whorl is tumid, the upper one plane. The aperture is lunate, about three-fifths the length of the shell. The columella, about one-third the length of the aperture, is flat, and divided by a single groove.

== Distribution ==
This marine species occurs in the Atlantic Ocean off Argentina and the Falkland Islands.
