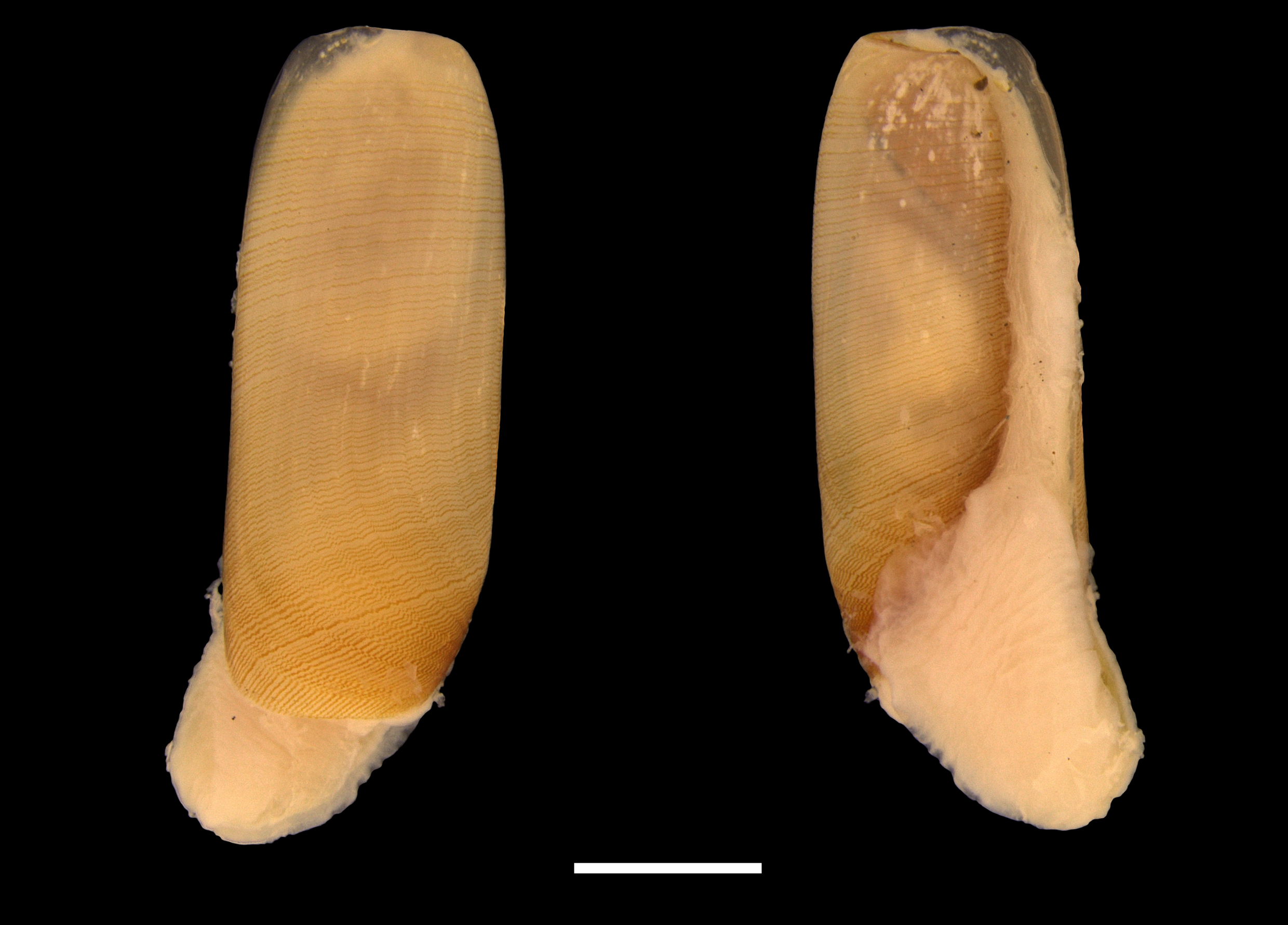

Scientific classification
- Kingdom: Animalia
- Phylum: Mollusca
- Class: Gastropoda
- Order: Cephalaspidea
- Family: Cylichnidae
- Genus: Cylichna
- Species: C. cylindracea

Binomial name
- Cylichna cylindracea (Pennant, 1777)

= Cylichna cylindracea =

Species of gastropod

Cylichna cylindracea is a species of gastropods belonging to the family Cylichnidae.

The species is found in America, Europe, Africa. It is a predator of foraminiferans, Ammonia batavus and Globobulimina turgida
