= Cylichna thetidis =

Scientific classification
- Kingdom: Animalia
- Phylum: Mollusca
- Class: Gastropoda
- Order: Cephalaspidea
- Family: Cylichnidae
- Genus: Cylichna
- Species: C. thetidis

Binomial name
- Cylichna thetidis Hedley, 1903

Species of gastropod

Cylichna thetidis is a species of sea snails or bubble snail, a marine opisthobranch gastropod mollusc in the family Cylichnidae, the chalice bubble snails or canoe bubble snails.
