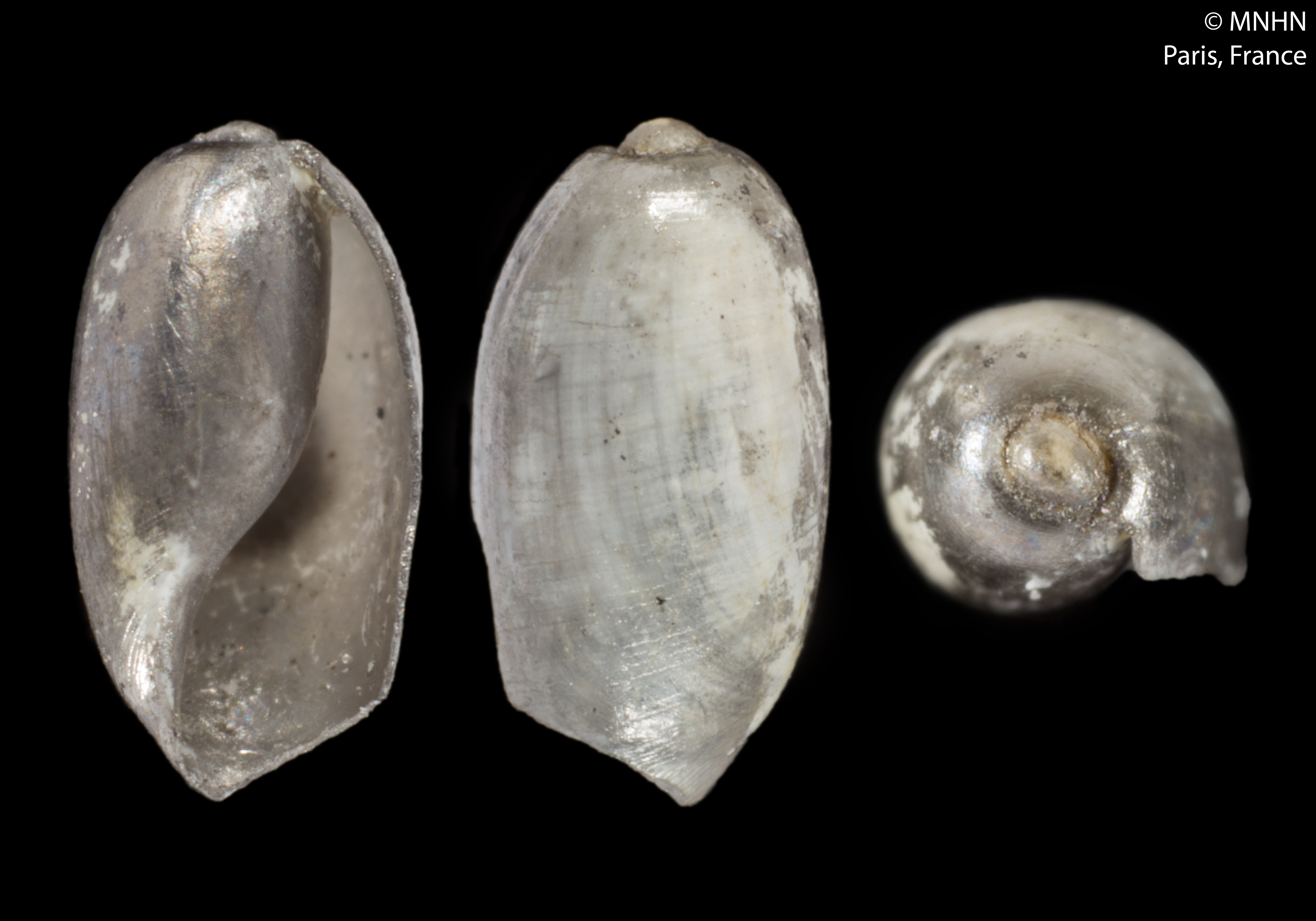
- Shell of Mamillocylichna abyssicola (holotype at MNHN, Paris)

Scientific classification
- Kingdom: Animalia
- Phylum: Mollusca
- Class: Gastropoda
- Order: Cephalaspidea
- Superfamily: Cylichnoidea
- Family: Cylichnidae
- Genus: Mamillocylichna; F. Nordsieck, 1972

Type species
- Cylichna richardi Dautzenberg, 1889

= Mamillocylichna =

Genus of gastropods

Mamillocylichna is a genus of sea snails or bubble snails, marine gastropod molluscs in the family Cylichnidae, the "chalice bubble snails".

== Species ==
- Mamillocylichna abyssicola Bouchet, 1975
- Mamillocylichna richardi (Dautzenberg, 1889)
