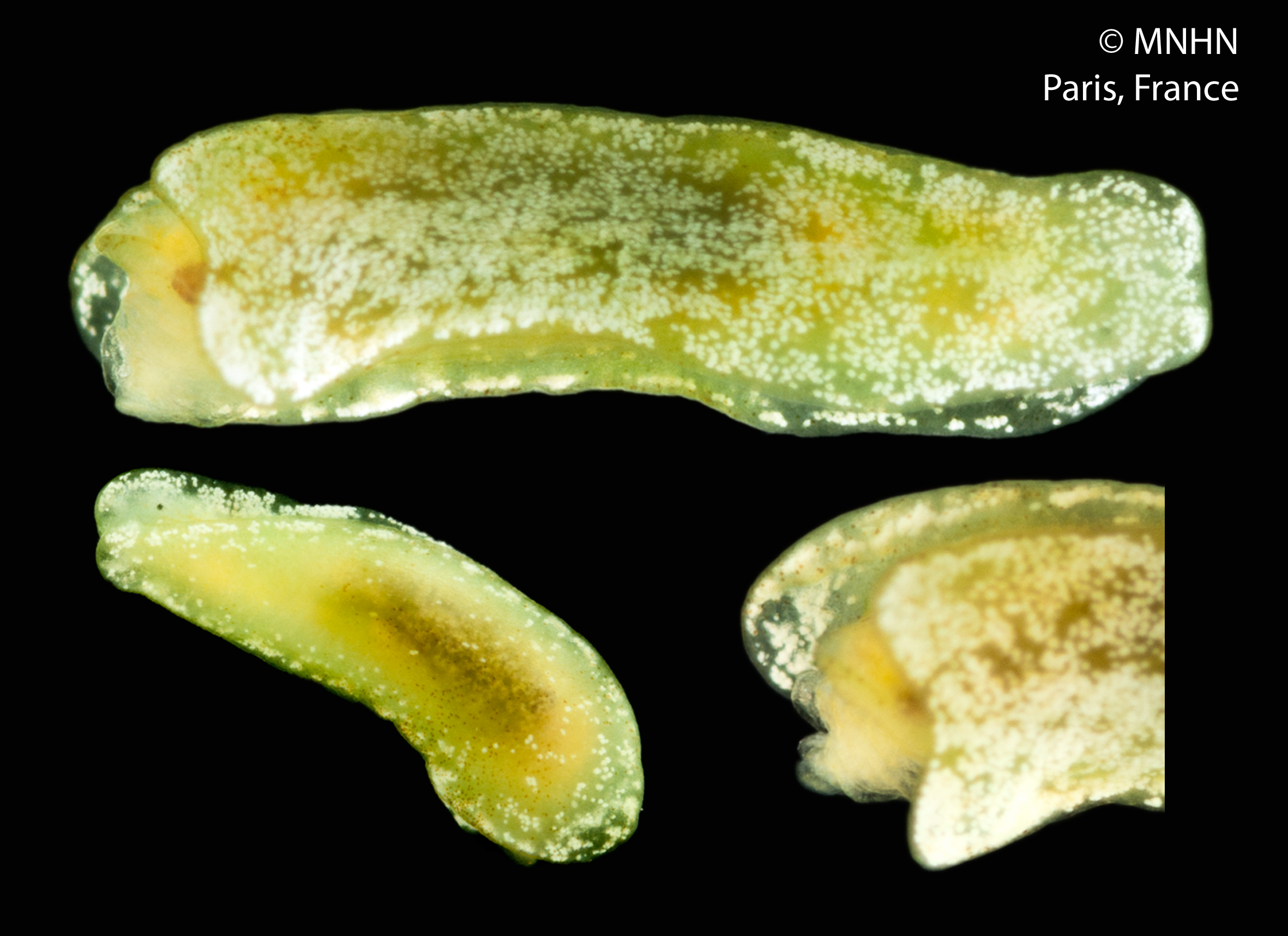
- Karukerina antola (specimen at MNHN, Paris)

Scientific classification
- Kingdom: Animalia
- Phylum: Mollusca
- Class: Gastropoda
- Order: Runcinida
- Superfamily: Runcinoidea
- Family: Runcinidae
- Genus: Karukerina; Ortea, 2013

Type species
- Karukerina antola Ortea, 2013

= Karukerina =

Genus of gastropods

Karukerina is a genus of medium-sized sea slugs, marine opisthobranch gastropod mollusks. They are headshield slugs, in the family Runcinidae.

== Species ==
- Karukerina antola Ortea, 2013
