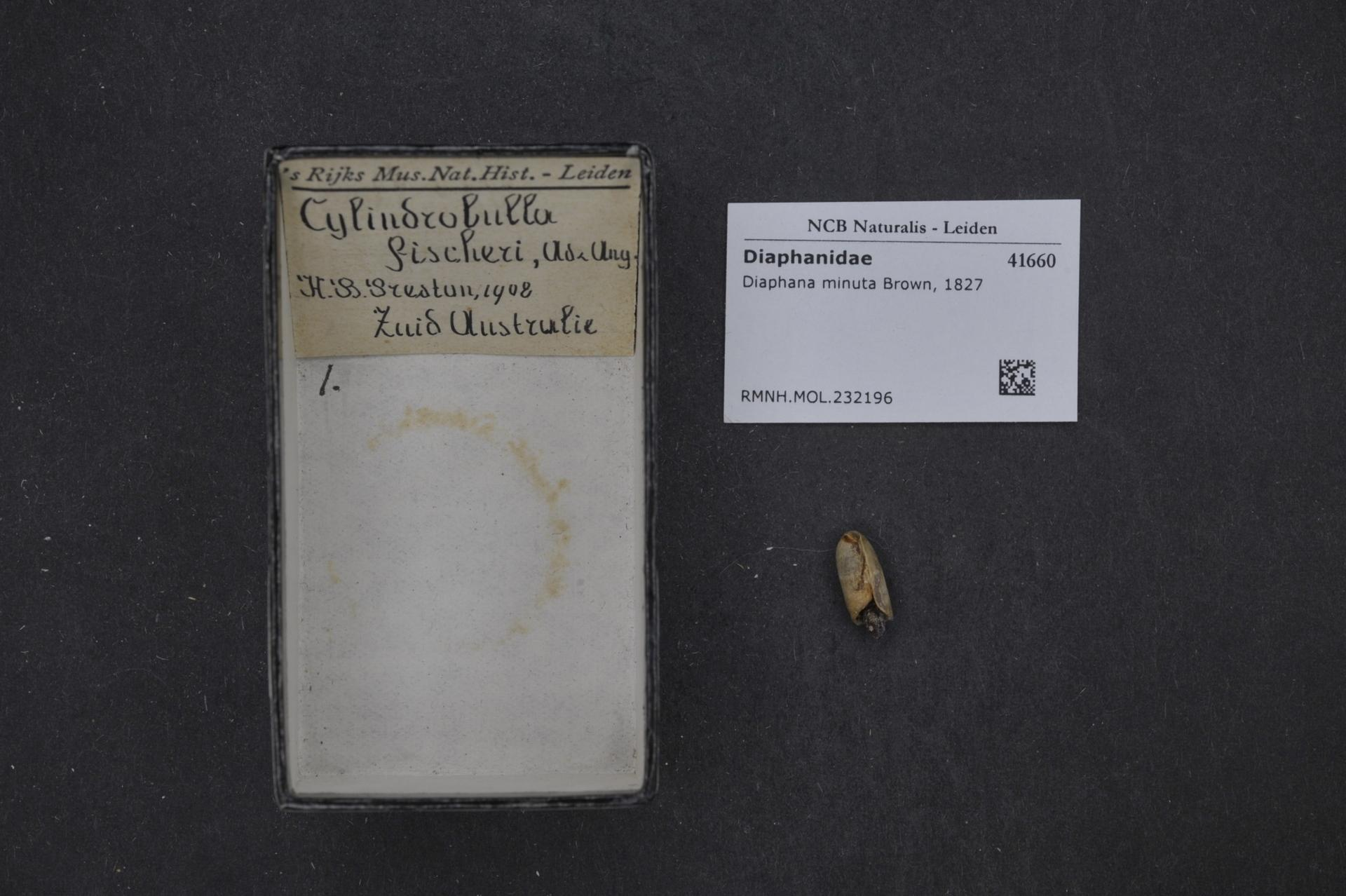

Scientific classification
- Kingdom: Animalia
- Phylum: Mollusca
- Class: Gastropoda
- Order: Cephalaspidea
- Family: Diaphanidae
- Genus: Diaphana
- Species: D. minuta

Binomial name
- Diaphana minuta Brown, 1827

= Diaphana minuta =

Species of gastropod

Diaphana minuta is a species of gastropods belonging to the family Diaphanidae.

== Taxonomy ==
Kingdom: Animalia

- Phylum: Mollusca
- Class: Gastropoda
- Subclass: Heterobranchia
- Infraclass: Euthyneura
- Subterclass: Tectipleura
- Order: Cephalaspidea
- Superfamily: Cylichnoidea
- Family: Diaphanidae
- Genus: Diaphana
- Species: Diaphana minuta
- Binomial name: Diaphana minuta Brown, 1827

The species is accepted as valid in MolluscaBase and the World Register of Marine Species (WoRMS).

== Description ==
Diaphana minuta is a very small, translucent to white gastropod, typically 1.2–6 mm in size.

Diagnostic features include:

- Smooth, external shell
- White body
- Bifurcated posterior foot
- Cephalic shield with tentacular lobes
- Denticulate radular teeth
- A gizzard lacking plates
- A male reproductive system with a short penial sheath dividing into two coiled prostate branches

== Distribution ==
=== General Range ===
According to WoRMS and MolluscaBase, Diaphana minuta has a broad circumpolar distribution, occurring in:

- North Pacific (Japan, British Columbia, possibly Baja California)
- Western Atlantic (Canada: Gulf of St. Lawrence, Quebec, Nova Scotia; USA: Maine, Massachusetts, Connecticut)
- Europe (including Arctic and sub‑Arctic regions)The species is found in Europe and North America, with a circumpolar distribution.

== Depth Range ==
The species can be found in the intertidal zone down to 327–350 m.

== Habitat and Ecology ==
Diaphana minuta inhabits a wide variety of substrates, including:

- Tide pools
- Mud, sand, clay
- Pebbles and shell gravel
- Algae (including Corallina)

== Taxonomic Notes ==
Historically, D. minuta was confused with several similar northern species. Early authors such as G.O. Sars (1878) misidentified multiple Diaphana species, leading to taxonomic instability. Later revisions, especially by Schiøtte (1998), clarified species boundaries and confirmed D. minuta as a distinct, valid species.
