= Cylichna gouldii =

Scientific classification
- Domain: Eukaryota
- Kingdom: Animalia
- Phylum: Mollusca
- Class: Gastropoda
- Order: Cephalaspidea
- Family: Cylichnidae
- Genus: Cylichna
- Species: C. gouldii

Binomial name
- Cylichna gouldii Couthouy, 1839

Species of gastropod

Cylichna gouldii is a species of very small sea snail, a small bubble snail, a marine gastropod mollusk in the family Cylichnidae.

This bubble snail lives in the Western Atlantic Ocean and has been found in Nova Scotia, Maine and Massachusetts.
