= Aliculastrum secalinum =

Scientific classification
- Kingdom: Animalia
- Phylum: Mollusca
- Class: Gastropoda
- Order: Cephalaspidea
- Family: Haminoeidae
- Genus: Aliculastrum
- Species: A. secalinum

Binomial name
- Aliculastrum secalinum (A. Adams, 1862)

Synonyms
- Alicula secalina (A. Adams, 1862) (original combination); Atys (Alicula) secalina A. Adams, 1862 superseded combination

Species of gastropod

Aliculastrum secalinum is a species of gastropods belonging to the family Haminoeidae.

== Description ==
(Original description in Latin) A cylindrically ovate shell featuring a small fissure, with the apex slightly truncated and minimally perforated. The shell has a horn-colored, semi-opaque appearance, and is entirely marked by transverse striations, which are more widely spaced and faint in the middle. The aperture is linear, with an oblique and slightly thickened inner lip, while the outer lip is nearly straight in its central portion.

This is a small, grain-like, horn-coloured species, with the apex small and truncate, and the outer lip hardly produced beyond it.

== Distribution ==
The marine species in Sea of Japan and the East China Sea.
