= C. gouldii =

C. gouldii may refer to:

- Cardamine gouldii, a plant species in the genus Cardamine found in Bhutan
- Chalinolobus gouldii, the Gould's wattled bat, a bat species found in Australia
- Cylichna gouldii, a sea snail species

== See also ==
- Gouldii (disambiguation)
