= Sphaerocylichna =

Scientific classification
- Domain: Eukaryota
- Kingdom: Animalia
- Phylum: Mollusca
- Class: Gastropoda
- Order: Cephalaspidea
- Family: Cylichnidae
- Genus: Sphaerocylichna; Theile, 1925

Genus of gastropods

Sphaerocylichna is a genus of deepsea snails or bubble snails, marine opisthobranch gastropod mollusks in the family Cylichnidae, the canoe bubbles or chalice bubble snails.

== Species ==
Species within the genus Sphaerocylichna include:

- Sphaerocylichna incommoda
