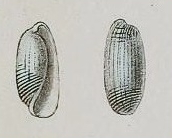
- Drawing of a shell of Aliculastrum parallelum

Scientific classification
- Kingdom: Animalia
- Phylum: Mollusca
- Class: Gastropoda
- Order: Cephalaspidea
- Family: Haminoeidae
- Genus: Aliculastrum
- Species: A. parallelum

Binomial name
- Aliculastrum parallelum (A. Gould, 1847)
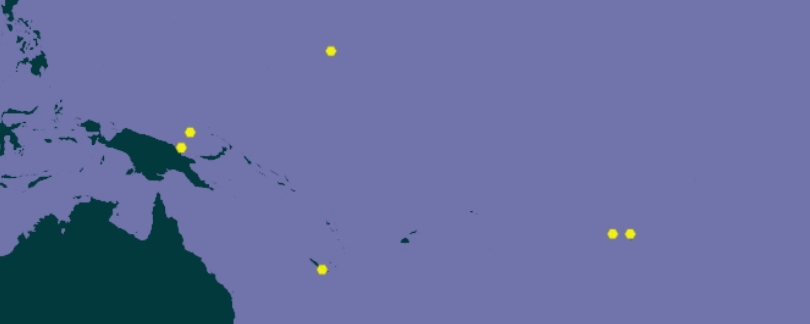

Synonyms
- Bulla parallela A. Gould, 1847 (original combination)

= Aliculastrum parallelum =

Species of gastropod

Aliculastrum parallelum is a species of gastropods belonging to the family Haminoeidae.

== Description ==
(Original description in Latin) A small, thin, cylindrical, milky-white shell, rounded at the front and conical at the back, without perforation. It is finely striated longitudinally, with the apex and base crossed by wavy striae. The aperture is narrow and widens downward. The columella is covered with a callus that is not tightly pressed. The outer lip extends beyond the spire and then twists downward.

== Distribution ==
The marine species in the Pacific Ocean (Marshall Islands, Guam, French Polynesia) and off the Philippines, Japan, Papua New Guinea and New Caledonia.
