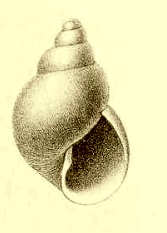
- Original image of a shell of Toledonia major

Scientific classification
- Kingdom: Animalia
- Phylum: Mollusca
- Class: Gastropoda
- Order: Cephalaspidea
- Family: Cylichnidae
- Genus: Toledonia; Dall, 1902

Synonyms
- Odostomiopsis Thiele, 1904; Ohlinia Strebel, 1905; Ptisanula Odhner, 1913

= Toledonia =

Genus of gastropods

Toledonia is a genus of sea snails, marine gastropod molluscs in the family Cylichnidae.

Toledonia is the type genus of the subfamily Toledoniinae.

== Description ==
Toledonia was originally described by American malacologist William Healey Dall in 1902. Dall's original text (the type description) reads as follows:

TOLEDONIA, new genus.

Shell small, smooth, thin, imperforate, succineæform; pillar continuous with the basal margin of the aperture, straight, but with an elevated thin plait near the base of the pillar, which appears to be continued into the coil of the shell; nucleus smooth, dextral; soft parts unknown. Type, T. perplexa Dall.

This little shell has a combination of characters which prevent its being assigned to any known genus. It differs from any of the Pyramidellidae in its form and dextral nucleus; from the Acteonidae by its peculiar pillar and dextral nucleus; from immature Ringicula by its single plait and general aspect. It is not certain even to what family of gastropods it should be assigned. As it was dredged at a considerable depth there seems no reason to doubt it is normally marine.

== Species ==
Species within the genus Toledonia include:

- Toledonia biplicata (Strebel, 1908)
- Toledonia brevior Eales, 1923
- Toledonia bullata (Gould, 1847) - Distribution: Falklands, Argentina. Length: 9.2 mm.
- Toledonia circumrosa (Thiele, 1904)
- Toledonia elata Thiele, 1912
- Toledonia epongensis Valdés, 2008
- Toledonia globosa Hedley, 1916
- Toledonia limnaeaeformis (E. A. Smith, 1879) - Distribution: Antarctica.
- Toledonia limnaeoides (Odhner, 1913) - Distribution: West Greenland. Length: 2.6 mm.
- Toledonia major (Hedley, 1911) - synonym: Toledonia elata J. Thiele, 1912 - Distribution: Subantarctic, South Sandwich Islands, South Shetlands; Antarctic Peninsula. Length: 6.6 mm. Found at depths up to 200 m.
- Toledonia media Thiele, 1912
- Toledonia neocaledonica Valdés, 2008
- Toledonia palmeri Dell, 1990 - Distribution: Antarctic. Length: 2.6 mm.
- Toledonia parelata Dell, 1990 - Distribution: Tierra del Fuego. Length: 6.1 mm. Found at depths between 80 m and 230 m.
- Toledonia perplexa Dall, 1902 - type species. Distribution: Argentina; Tierra del Fuego; Straits of Magellan; Falklands. Length: 3.2 mm. Description: found to depths of 230 m.
- Toledonia punctata J. Thiele, 1912 - Distribution: Subantarctic, Tierra del Fuego; South Georgia; Kerguelen. Length: 6 mm. Description: found at depths between 115 m and 567 m.
- Toledonia seguenzae (Watson, 1886)
- Toledonia striata J. Thiele, 1912 - Distribution: Antarctica.
- Toledonia succineaformis Powell, 1955 - Distribution: New Zealand.
- Toledonia warenella Golding, 2010

Species brought into synonymy

- Toledonia hedleyi Powell, 1958: synonym of Toledonia major (Hedley, 1911)
- Toledonia normani (Friele, 1886): synonym of Ondina normani (Friele, 1886)
- Toledonia ringei (Strebel, 1905): synonym of Toledonia vagabunda (Mabille, 1885)
- Toledonia typica (Thiele, 1904): synonym of Toledonia limnaeaeformis (E. A. Smith, 1879)
- Toledonia vagabunda (Mabille, 1885): synonym of Lanayrella vagabunda (Mabille, 1885) - Distribution: Tierra del Fuego. Length: 10 mm.
