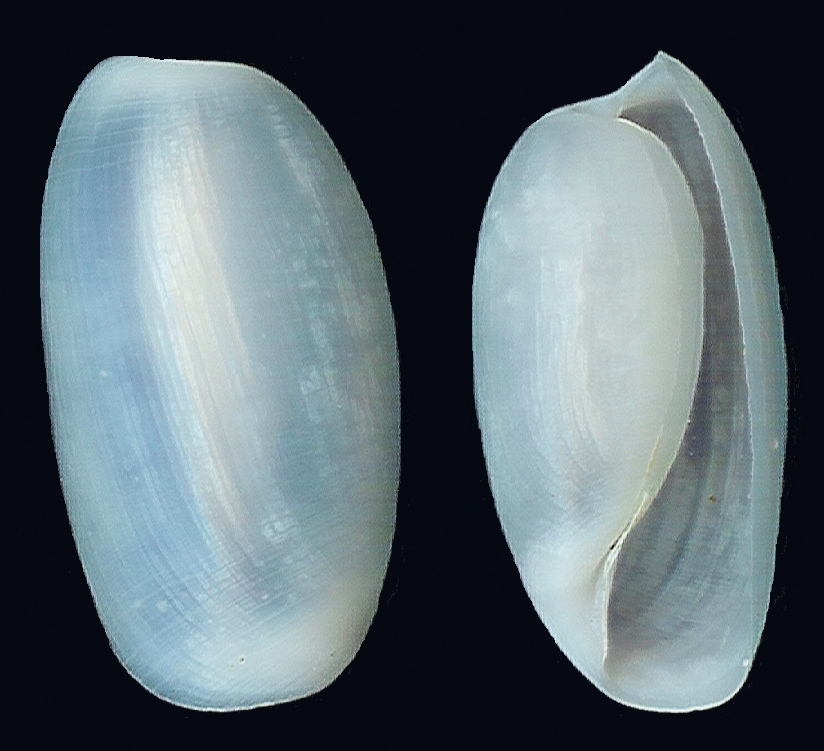
- Shell of Aliculastrum solidum

Scientific classification
- Kingdom: Animalia
- Phylum: Mollusca
- Class: Gastropoda
- Order: Cephalaspidea
- Family: Haminoeidae
- Genus: Aliculastrum
- Species: A. solidum

Binomial name
- Aliculastrum solidum (Bruguière, 1792)
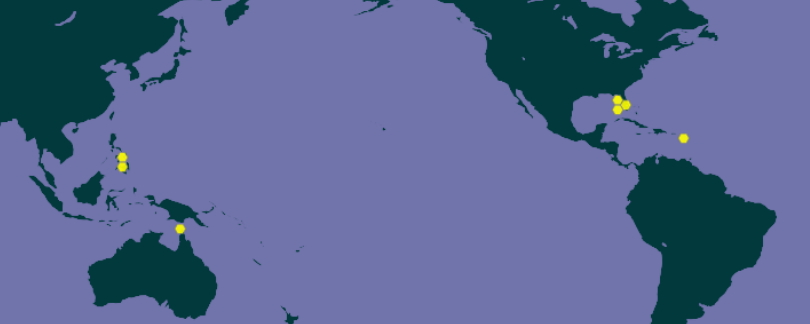

Synonyms
- Bulla solida Bruguière, 1792 superseded combination

= Aliculastrum solidum =

Species of gastropod

Aliculastrum solidum is a species of gastropods belonging to the family Haminoeidae.

== Distribution ==
This marine species occurs off the Philippines.
