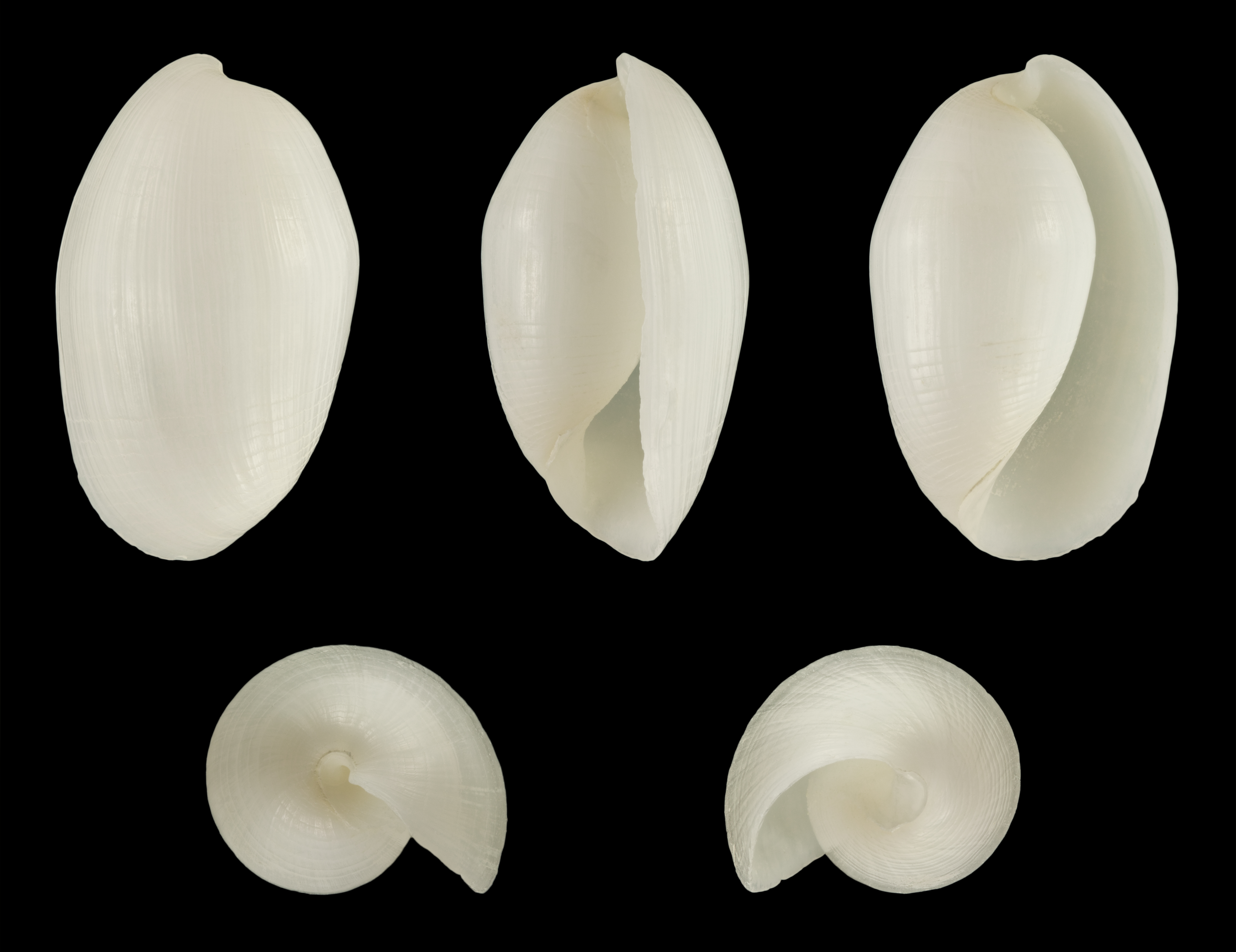
- Aliculastrum cylindricum

Scientific classification
- Kingdom: Animalia
- Phylum: Mollusca
- Class: Gastropoda
- Order: Cephalaspidea
- Family: Haminoeidae
- Genus: Aliculastrum; Pilsbry, 1896

Species
- See text

Synonyms
- Alicula Ehrenberg, 1831 (invalid: junior homonym of Alicula Eichwald, 1830; Aliculastrum is a replacement name); Atys (Alicula) Ehrenberg, 1831; Atys (Aliculastrum) Pilsbry, 1896 (original rank); Nipponatys Habe, 1952

= Aliculastrum =

Genus of gastropods

Aliculastrum is a genus of small sea snails or bubble snails, marine opisthobranch gastropod molluscs in the family Haminoeidae.

This genus was originally considered to be a subgenus of Atys.

== Life habits ==
These bubble snails are herbivores; they live on plant or algal substrates.

== Species ==
Species in the genus Aliculastrum include:

- † Aliculastrum attenuatum (J. de C. Sowerby, 1831)
- Aliculastrum cylindricum (Helbling, 1779)
- Aliculastrum debile (Pease, 1860)
- Aliculastrum exaratum (Carpenter, 1857)
- † Aliculastrum extensum (J. de C. Sowerby, 1831)
- Aliculastrum parallelum (Gould, 1847)
- † Aliculastrum protocylindricum (Vredenburg, 1925)
- Aliculastrum secalinum (A. Adams, 1862)
- Aliculastrum solidum (Bruguière, 1792)
- Aliculastrum tumidum (Burn, 1978)
- Aliculastrum volvulina (A. Adams, 1862)

Synonyms

- Aliculastrum ooformis (Habe, 1964): synonym of Vellicolla ooformis (Habe, 1952)
