= Eoscaphandridae =

Scientific classification
- Kingdom: Animalia
- Phylum: Mollusca
- Class: Gastropoda
- Order: Cephalaspidea
- Superfamily: Cylichnoidea
- Family: Eoscaphandridae; Chaban & Kijashko, 2016

Family of molluscs

Eoscaphandridae is a family of gastropods belonging to the order Cephalaspidea.

== Taxonomy ==
Below is a list of genera that belongs to this family:

- Cylichnoides Minichev, 1977
- Eoscaphander Habe, 1952
- Hamineobulla Habe, 1950
- Pseudocylichna Chaban & Kijashko, 2016
