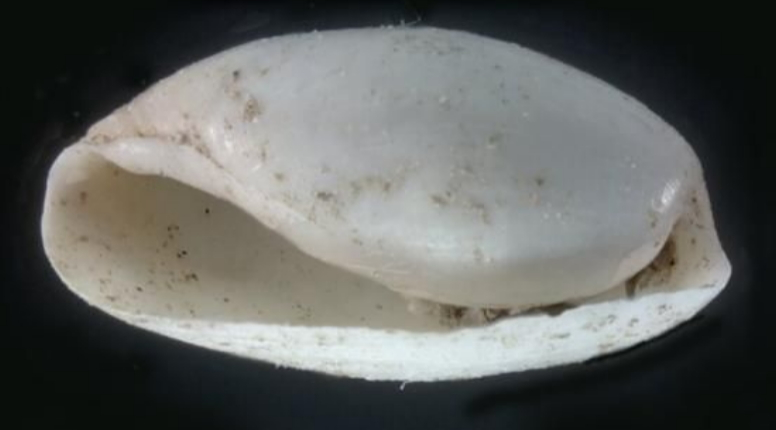
- Shell of Aliculastrum tumidum

Scientific classification
- Kingdom: Animalia
- Phylum: Mollusca
- Class: Gastropoda
- Order: Cephalaspidea
- Family: Haminoeidae
- Genus: Aliculastrum
- Species: A. tumidum

Binomial name
- Aliculastrum tumidum (Burn, 1978)

Synonyms
- Nipponatys tumida Burn, 1978 (original combination)

= Aliculastrum tumidum =

Species of gastropod

Aliculastrum tumidum is a species of gastropods belonging to the family Haminoeidae.

== Description ==
The length of the shell attains 6 mm, its diameter is 2.83 mm.

== Distribution ==
This marine species is endemic to Australia and occurs off Victoria.
