= Aliculastrum volvulina =

Scientific classification
- Kingdom: Animalia
- Phylum: Mollusca
- Class: Gastropoda
- Order: Cephalaspidea
- Family: Haminoeidae
- Genus: Aliculastrum
- Species: A. volvulina

Binomial name
- Aliculastrum volvulina (A. Adams, 1862)

Synonyms
- Alicula volvulina (A. Adams, 1862) superseded combination; Atys (Alicula) volvulina A. Adams, 1862 superseded combination; Atys volvulina A. Adams, 1862 superseded combination; Limulatys volvulinus (A. Adams, 1862) superseded combination; Nipponatys volvulina (A. Adams, 1862) superseded combination

Species of gastropod

Aliculastrum volvulina is a species of gastropods belonging to the family Haminoeidae.

== Description ==
(Original description in Latin) A cylindrically ovate shell with a small fissure, tapering at both ends and adorned with widely spaced transverse striations. The shell is white, thin, opaque, and lustrous. The aperture is narrow, with an oblique, gently curved inner lip that thickens towards the front, while the outer lip forms a smooth, regular arch.

== Distribution ==
The marine species in Sea of Japan and the East China Sea.
