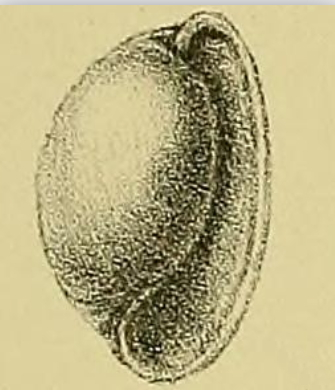
- Shell of Sphaerocylichna incommoda (holotype)

Scientific classification
- Kingdom: Animalia
- Phylum: Mollusca
- Class: Gastropoda
- Order: Cephalaspidea
- Family: Cylichnidae
- Genus: Sphaerocylichna
- Species: S. incommoda

Binomial name
- Sphaerocylichna incommoda (E. A. Smith, 1891)

Synonyms
- Austrocylichna lagena Burn, 1978; Bulla incommoda E. A. Smith, 1891; Cylichna bulloides Dell, 1956

= Sphaerocylichna incommoda =

Species of gastropod

Sphaerocylichna incommoda is a species of deepsea snail or bubble snail, a marine opisthobranch gastropod mollusk in the family Cylichnidae, the canoe bubbles or chalice bubble snails.

== Description ==
(Original description in Latin) The shell is small, narrowly umbilicated, ovate, white, and glossy. It is sculptured above and below with a few transverse striae and striated with growth lines. The apex is very narrowly perforate. The aperture is narrow, somewhat dilated below, and produced above beyond the apex. The columella is slightly twisted, curved below, reflected, and expanded.

== Distribution ==
This marine species is endemic to Australia and occurs off New South Wales, South Australia and Victoria.
