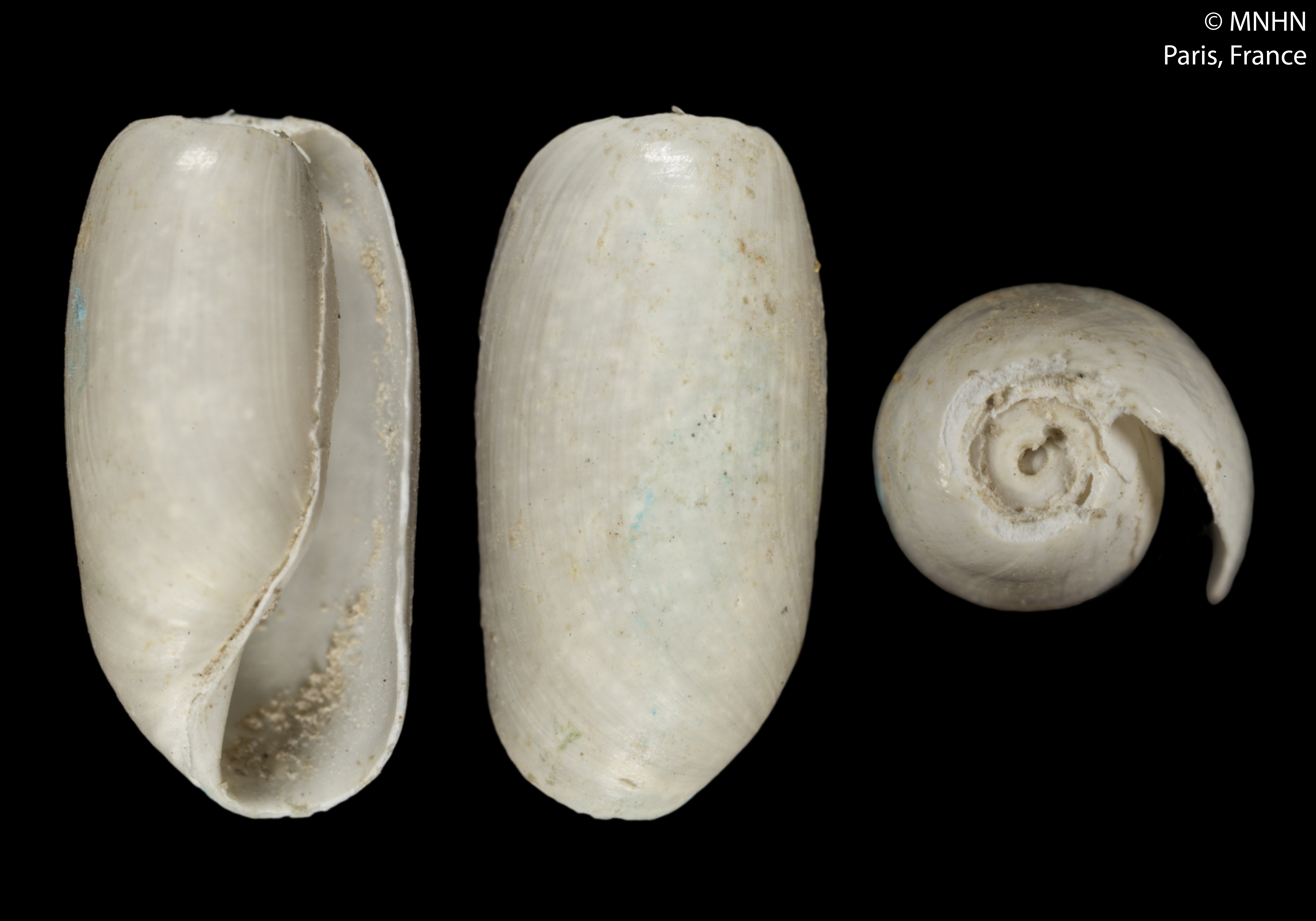
- Shell of Cylichna lemchei (holotype at MNHN, Paris)

Scientific classification
- Kingdom: Animalia
- Phylum: Mollusca
- Class: Gastropoda
- Order: Cephalaspidea
- Superfamily: Cylichnoidea
- Family: Cylichnidae
- Genus: Cylichna; Lovén, 1846

Type species
- Bulla cylindracea Pennant, 1777

Synonyms
- Bulla (Cylichna) Lovén, 1846; Bullinella Newton, 1891; Cylichna (Acrostemma) Cossmann, 1889 †· accepted, alternate representation; Cylichna (Cylichnopsis) Cossmann, 1904 †· accepted, alternate representation; Cylichnella (Bullinella) Newton, 1891; Cylindrella Swainson, 1840; Eocylichna Kuroda & Habe, 1952

= Cylichna =

Genus of gastropods

Cylichna is a genus of sea snails or bubble snails, marine gastropod molluscs in the family Cylichnidae, the "chalice bubble snails".

== Species ==
Species within the genus Cylichna include:

- Cylichna aethiopica
- Cylichna affinis
- Cylichna alba (T. Brown, 1827) - white chalice-bubble
- Cylichna algoensis
- Cylichna andersoni
- Cylichna arthuri Dautzenberg, 1929
- Cylichna atahualpa (Dall, 1908)
- Cylichna ationsa
- Cylichna atlantica E. A. Smith, 1890
- Cylichna attanosa
- Cylichna attonsa Carpenter, 1865
- Cylichna auberii (d'Orbigny, 1841)
- Cylichna aula
- Cylichna biplicata (A. Adams in Sowerby, 1850)
- Cylichna brevissima
- Cylichna bruguierei
- Cylichna chevreuxi Dautzenberg, 1889
- Cylichna collyra Melvill, 1906
- Cylichna costata
- Cylichna crebripunctata (Jeffreys, 1881)
- Cylichna crispula
- Cylichna crossei Bucquoy, Dautzenberg & Dollfus, 1886
- Cylichna cumberlandiana (Strebel, 1908)
- Cylichna cylindracea (Pennant, 1777)
- Cylichna dalli A. E. Verrill, 1882
- Cylichna diegensis (Dall, 1919) - San Diego chalice-bubble
- Cylichna discus Watson, 1886
- Cylichna dulcis Thiele, 1925
- Cylichna eburnea A. E. Verrill, 1885 - ivory chalice-bubble
- Cylichna erecta Hedley, 1899 (taxon inquirendum)
- Cylichna euthlasta Melvill, 1918
- Cylichna fantasma (Baker and Hanna, 1927)
- Cylichna gelida (Smith, 1907)
- Cylichna georgiana (Strebel, 1908)
- Cylichna gouldii (Couthouy, 1839)
- Cylichna grovesi Valdès, 2008
- Cylichna inca (Dall, 1908)
- Cylichna intermissia curta
- Cylichna involuta
- Cylichna jaba
- Cylichna krebsii Mörch, 1875
- Cylichna lemchei Bouchet & Warén, 1979
- Cylichna linearis Jeffreys, 1867 - lined chalice-bubble
- Cylichna luticola (C. B. Adams, 1852)
- Cylichna magna Lemche, 1941
- Cylichna modesta
- Cylichna mongii (Audouin, 1826)
- Cylichna nida
- Cylichna nipponensis Nomura & Hatai, 1940
- Cylichna nucleola (Reeve, 1855) - kernel chalice-bubble
- Cylichna obscura Sykes, 1903
- Cylichna occulta (Mighels and C. B. Adams, 1842) - concealed chalice-bubble
- Cylichna occulta densistriata
- Cylichna orycta (Watson, 1883)
- Cylichna oryza
- Cylichna ovata Jeffreys, 1871
- Cylichna parallela
- Cylichna parvula Jeffreys, 1883
- Cylichna petiti Dautzenberg, 1923
- Cylichna piettei Dautzenberg & Fischer H., 1896
- Cylichna pizarro (Dall, 1908)
- Cylichna propecylindracea (de Gregorio, 1890)
- Cylichna protracta
- Cylichna proxima
- Cylichna pumila
- Cylichna pusilla
- Cylichna quercinensis
- Cylichna remissa E. A. Smith, 1890
- Cylichna secalina
- Cylichna similis
- Cylichna stephensae Strong & Hertlein, 1939
- Cylichna striata
- Cylichna subcylindrica
- Cylichna sundaica
- Cylichna tanyumphalos Valdès, 2008
- Cylichna tenuissima
- Cylichna thetidis Hedley, 1903
- Cylichna tubulosa Gould, 1859
- Cylichna umbilicata
- Cylichna veleronis Strong & Hertlein, 1939
- Cylichna verrillii Dall, 1889
- Cylichna vortex (Dall, 1881)
- Cylichna zealandica T.W. Kirk, 1880

Species brought into synonymy

- Cylichna arachis (Quoy & Gaimard, 1833): synonym of Adamnestia arachis (Quoy & Gaimard, 1833)
- Cylichna atkinsoni Tenison-Woods, 1876: synonym of Retusa atkinsoni (Tenison-Woods, 1876)
- Cylichna atyoides Thiele, 1925: synonym of Sphaerocylichna atyoides (Thiele, 1925)
- Cylichna bizona (A. Adams, 1850): synonym of Mnestia bizona (A. Adams, 1850)
- Cylichna bulloides Dell, 1956: synonym of Sphaerocylichna incommoda (E. A. Smith, 1891)
- Cylichna consobrina Gould, 1859: synonym of Cylichna alba (Brown, 1827)
- Cylichna cylindrica (Bruguière, 1792): synonym of Cylichna cylindracea (Pennant, 1777)
- Cylichna densistriata Leche, 1878: synonym of Cylichnoides densistriata (Leche, 1878)
- Cylichna elongata Locard, 1886: synonym of Cylichna cylindracea (Pennant, 1777)
- Cylichna girardi (Audouin, 1826): synonym of Cylichnina girardi (Audouin, 1826); synonym of Retusa girardi (Audouin, 1826)
- Cylichna grimaldii Dautzenberg: synonym of Cylichnatys grimaldii (Dautzenberg, 1891)
- Cylichna hoernesii: synonym of Pyrunculus hoernesii (Weinkauff, 1866)
- Cylichna incisula Yokoyama, 1928: synonym of Liloa porcellana (Gould, 1859)
- Cylichna laevisculpta Granata-Grillo, 1877: synonym of Cylichnina laevisculpta (Granata-Grillo, 1877); synonym of Retusa laevisculpta (Granata-Grillo, 1877)
- Cylichna mongei (Audouin, 1826): synonym of Cylichna mongii (Audouin, 1826)
- Cylichna nitidula Lovén, 1846: synonym of Cylichnina nitidula (Lovén, 1846); synonym of Retusa nitidula (Lovén, 1846)
- Cylichna nucleolus (Reeve, 1855): synonym of Cylichna nucleola (Reeve, 1855)
- Cylichna occulata: synonym of Cylichna occulta (Mighels & Adams, 1842)
- Cylichna producta (Brown, 1827): synonym of Cylichna cylindracea (Pennant, 1777)
- Cylichna propinqua M. Sars, 1858: synonym of Cylichna occulta (Mighels & Adams, 1842)
- Cylichna protumida Hedley, 1903: synonym of Retusa protumida (Hedley, 1903)
- Cylichna scalpta Reeve, 1855: synonym of Cylichna occulta (Mighels & Adams, 1842)
- Cylichna semisulcata Dunker, 1882: synonym of Liloa porcellana (Gould, 1859)
- Cylichna spreta Watson, 1897: synonym of Pyrunculus spretus (Watson, 1897)
- Cylichna strigella (A. Adams, 1850): synonym of Cylichna arthuri Dautzenberg, 1929
- Cylichna sumatrana Thiele, 1925: synonym of Relichna sumatrana (Thiele, 1925)
- Cylichna tayamaensis Habe, 1955: synonym of Cylichna alba (Brown, 1827)
- Cylichna venustula A. Adams, 1862: synonym of Relichna venustula (A. Adams, 1862)
