= Notodiaphana fragilis =

Scientific classification
- Kingdom: Animalia
- Phylum: Mollusca
- Class: Gastropoda
- Order: Cephalaspidea
- Superfamily: Cylichnoidea
- Family: Notodiaphanidae; Thiele, 1931
- Genus: Notodiaphana; Thiele, 1917
- Species: N. fragilis

Binomial name
- Notodiaphana fragilis Vélain, 1877

Species of gastropod

Notodiaphana fragilis is a species of marine snail, gastropod mollusk in the clade Architectibranchia.

Notodiaphana fragilis is the only species in the genus Notodiaphana. Genus Notodiaphana is the only genus in the family Notodiaphanidae.

It has been classified in the superfamily Diaphanoidea.

== Shell description ==
The little-known species have small, flimsy, almost globular shells, known as paper bubble shells.

The shell is minute, thin, fragile, colorless to translucent, and usually less than 5 mm in size. The overall shape is ovate, pear-shaped, and bulbous. There is a sunken apex.

The shells resemble those of the genus Haminoea.

== Distribution ==
The distribution of Notodiaphana fragilis includes the Indian Ocean.

== Ecology ==
This species occur in the sublittoral to abyssal zones.
