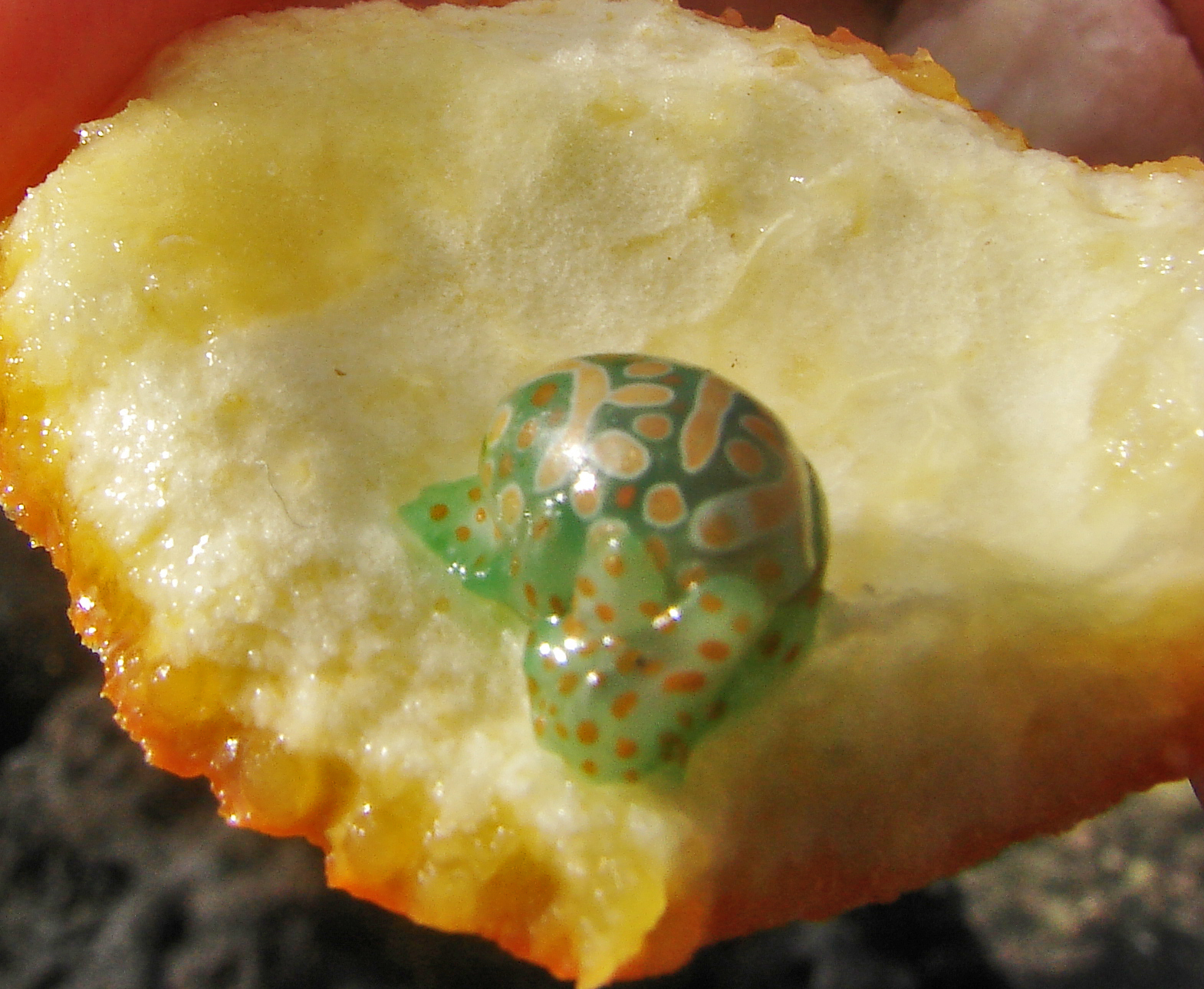
- Lamprohaminoea cymbalum, with orange peel for scale

Scientific classification
- Kingdom: Animalia
- Phylum: Mollusca
- Class: Gastropoda
- Order: Cephalaspidea
- Family: Haminoeidae
- Genus: Lamprohaminoea
- Species: L. cymbalum

Binomial name
- Lamprohaminoea cymbalum (Quoy & Gaimard, 1833)

Synonyms
- Bulla cymbalum Quoy & Gaimard, 1833; Haloa cymbalum (Quoy & Gaimard, 1833); Haminea aperta Pease, 1868; Haminea aperta oahuensis Pilsbry, 1917; Haminea cymbalum (Quoy & Gaimard, 1833); Haminoea cymbalum (Quoy & Gaimard, 1833); Haminoea simillima Pease, 1868; Lamprohaminoea simillima (Pease, 1868)

= Lamprohaminoea cymbalum =

Species of gastropod

Lamprohaminoea cymbalum, sometimes known as the cymbal bubble snail, is a species of sea snail or bubble snail, a marine opisthobranch gastropod mollusc in the family Haminoeidae, one of the families of bubble snails.

== Distribution ==
Lamprohaminoea cymbalum is found in the Indo-West Pacific oceans from Hawaii and Christmas Island. It is not a common species, but locally large populations can be found.

== Description ==
The soft tissues of L. cymbalum are lime green with orange and purple markings. As with all Haminoeidae, it is herbivorous and feeds on algae. It secretes a metabolite which has deterrent properties towards carnivorous fish.
