= Mnestia =

Scientific classification
- Domain: Eukaryota
- Kingdom: Animalia
- Phylum: Mollusca
- Class: Gastropoda
- Order: Cephalaspidea
- Family: Mnestiidae
- Genus: Mnestia; H.Adams & A.Adams, 1854

Genus of gastropods

Mnestia is a genus of gastropods belonging to the family Mnestiidae.

The genus has almost cosmopolitan distribution.

Species:

- Mnestia alboguttata (E.A.Smith, 1872)
- Mnestia arachis (Quoy & Gaimard, 1833)
- Mnestia colorata (Iredale, 1936)
- Mnestia girardi (Audouin, 1826)
- Mnestia japonica (A.Adams, 1862)
- Mnestia marmorata (A.Adams, 1850)
- Mnestia meyeri Cossmann, 1893
- Mnestia pulchra (Brazier, 1877)
- Mnestia villica (Gould, 1859)
