= Diaphana =

Scientific classification
- Domain: Eukaryota
- Kingdom: Animalia
- Phylum: Mollusca
- Class: Gastropoda
- Order: Cephalaspidea
- Family: Diaphanidae
- Genus: Diaphana; Brown, 1827

Genus of molluscs

Diaphana is a genus of gastropods belonging to the family Diaphanidae.

The genus has almost cosmopolitan distribution.

Species:

- Diaphana abyssalis Schiøtte, 1998
- Diaphana anderssoni (Strebel, 1908)
- Diaphana brazieri Angas, 1877
- Diaphana californica Dall, 1919
- Diaphana caribaea Espinosa, Ortea & Fernández-Garcés, 2001
- Diaphana cretica (Forbes, 1844)
- Diaphana flava (R.B.Watson, 1897)
- Diaphana floridana Dall, 1927
- Diaphana glacialis Odhner, 1907
- Diaphana globosa (Lovén, 1846)
- Diaphana haini Linse & Schiøtte, 2002
- Diaphana hiemalis (Couthouy, 1839)
- Diaphana inflata (Strebel, 1908)
- Diaphana lactea (Jeffreys, 1877)
- Diaphana lottae Bush, 1893
- Diaphana makarovi Gorbunov, 1946
- Diaphana marshalli (Sykes, 1904)
- Diaphana mauretaniensis Schiøtte, 1998
- Diaphana minuta T.Brown, 1827
- Diaphana pacifica Schiøtte, 1998
- Diaphana paessleri (Strebel, 1905)
- Diaphana pfefferi (Strebel, 1908)
- Diaphana tasmanica (Beddome, 1883)
