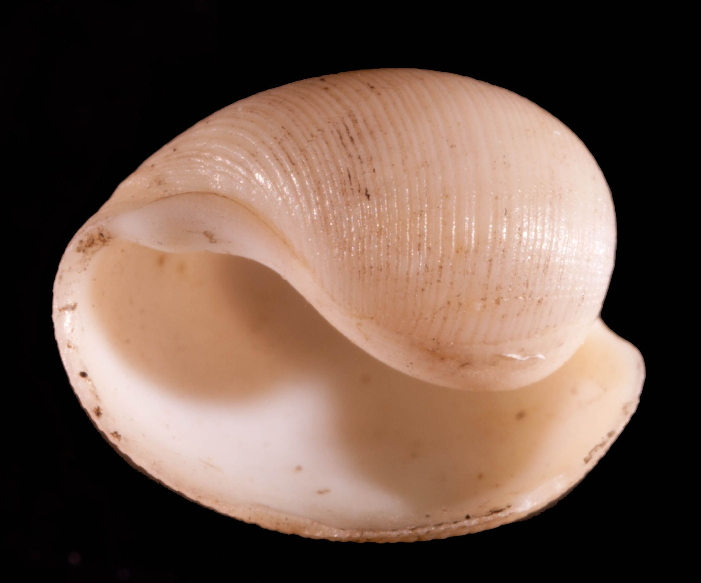
- Shell of Cylichnoides densistriatus (syntype at Swedish Museum of Natural History)

Scientific classification
- Kingdom: Animalia
- Phylum: Mollusca
- Class: Gastropoda
- Order: Cephalaspidea
- Family: Eoscaphandridae
- Genus: Cylichnoides; Minichev, 1977

Type species
- † Bulla occulta Mighels & C. B. Adams, 1842

Species
- See text

Synonyms
- Cylichna (Cylichnoides) Minichev, 1977 (original rank)

= Cylichnoides =

Genus of gastropod

Cylichnoides is a genus of headshield slugs that belongs to the family Eosdaphandridae.

Members of this genus are widely distributed across boreal and arctic waters being found in Alaska, Canada, Greenland, Iceland, northern Europe and Russia.

== Taxonomy ==
This genus currently contains five described species. This genus traditionally contained the four species however specimens collected from the Kara Sea show that they form a monophyletic group. This group was described in 2026 as Cylichnoides karaensis.

Species belonging to this genus are listed below:

- Cylichnoides densistriatus (Leche, 1878)
- Cylichnoides karaensis E. Chaban, D. Schepetov, M. Stanovova, N. Zhuravliova, A. Mirolyubov, I. Ekimova, 2026
- Cylichnoides occultus (Mighels & C. B. Adams, 1842)
- Cylichnoides scalptus (Reeve, 1855)
- Cylichnoides validus (Leche, 1878)
