= Architectibranchia =

Scientific classification
- Domain: Eukaryota
- Kingdom: Animalia
- Phylum: Mollusca
- Class: Gastropoda
- Infraclass: Lower Heterobranchia
- Clade: Architectibranchia; Haszprunar, 1985

Clade of gastropods

Architectibranchia is a clade of marine snails, gastropod molluscs.

It was originally established containing the superfamilies Acteonoidea, Ringiculoidea, and Diaphanoidea.

== 2005 taxonomy ==
Architectibranchia was not used in the taxonomy by Bouchet & Rocroi (2005) and this taxon name has been listed as an available name.

== 2009 taxonomy ==
Clade Architectibranchia was reinstated by Malaquias et al. in 2009; they limited the taxon to Acteonoidea and Ringiculoidea.

There are five families within the clade Architectibranchia:

- Acteonidae
- Aplustridae
- Bullinidae
- Ringiculidae
- Notodiaphanidae

== 2010 taxonomy ==
Taxon Architectibranchia is not explicitly mentioned in the molecular analysis by Jörger et al. (2010). However, some of its members were included: Acteonoidea was moved to Lower Heterobranchia.
