= Ilbiidae =

Scientific classification
- Kingdom: Animalia
- Phylum: Mollusca
- Class: Gastropoda
- Subterclass: Tectipleura
- Order: Runcinida
- Superfamily: Runcinoidea
- Family: Ilbiidae; Burn, 1963

Family of gastropods

Ilbiidae is a family of marine opisthobranch gastropod mollusks in the superfamily Runcinoidea.

This family has no subfamilies according to the taxonomy of the Gastropoda by Bouchet & Rocroi, 2005.

== Genera ==
- Fofinha Moro & Ortea, 2015
- Ilbia Burn, 1963, with two species (Australia, Marianas)
