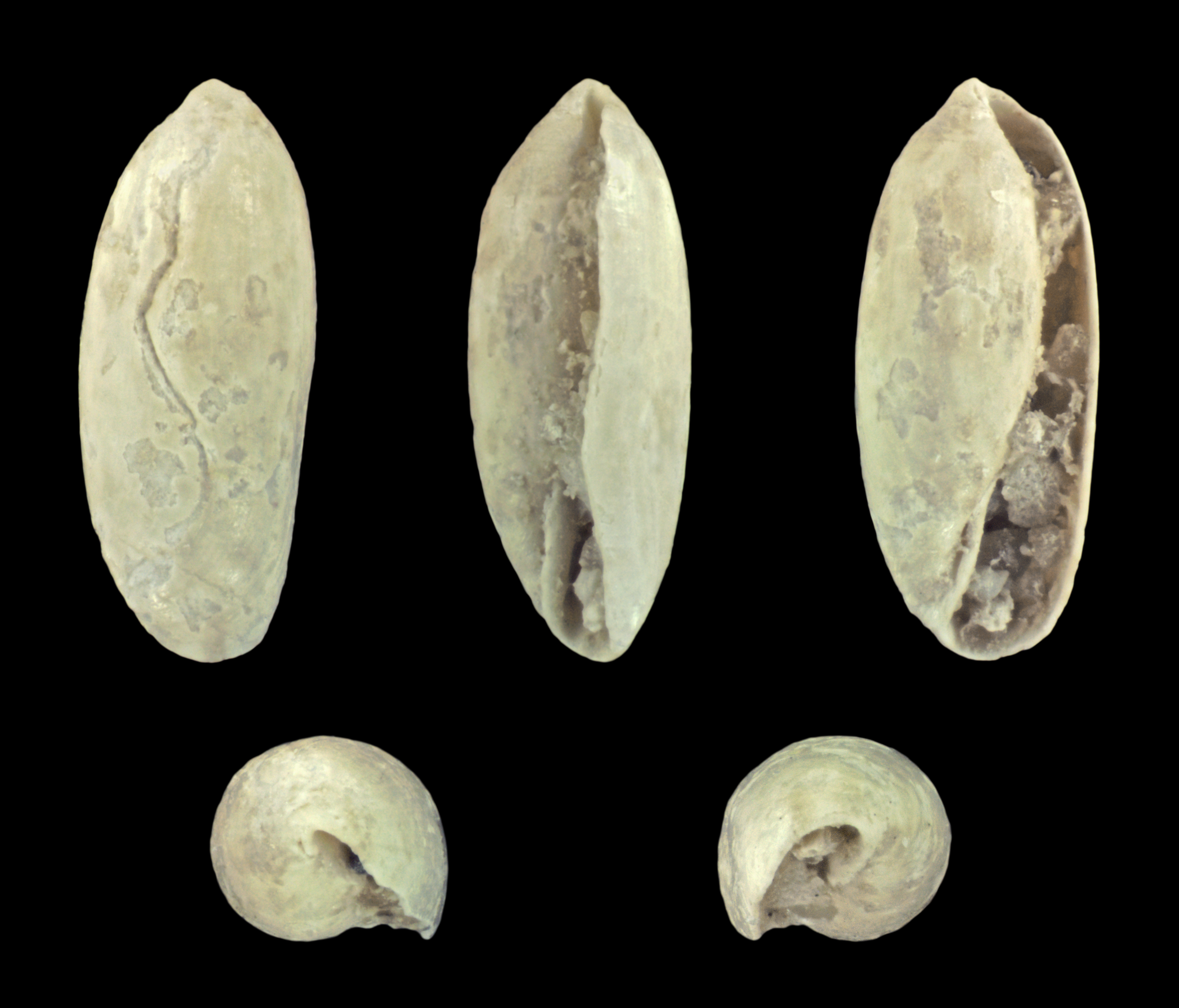
- Volvulella persimilis

Scientific classification
- Kingdom: Animalia
- Phylum: Mollusca
- Class: Gastropoda
- Order: Cephalaspidea
- Superfamily: Bulloidea
- Family: Rhizoridae; Dell, 1952

Genera
- See text

Synonyms
- Volvulellidae Chaban, 2000; Volvulidae Locard, 1886 (Invalid: Type genus a junior homonym of Volvula Gistl, 1848 [Diptera])

= Rhizoridae =

Family of gastropods

Rhizoridae is a family of very small sea snails, barrel-bubble snails, marine opisthobranch gastropod molluscs. These are headshield slugs, in the superfamily Bulloidea.

== Genera ==
Genera within the family Rhizoridae include:

- Rhizorus Montfort, 1810
- Volvulella Newton, 1891

Genera brought into synonymy

- Paravolvulella Harry, 1967: synonym of Volvulella Newton, 1891
- Volvula A. Adams, 1850: synonym of Volvulella Newton, 1891
