= Pluscula =

Scientific classification
- Kingdom: Animalia
- Phylum: Mollusca
- Class: Gastropoda
- Family: Philinoglossidae
- Genus: Pluscula; Er. Marcus, 1953
- Species: P. cuica

Binomial name
- Pluscula cuica Er. Marcus, 1953

Species of gastropod

Pluscula is a genus of marine snails, gastropod molluscs in the superfamily Philinoidea within the clade Cephalaspidea. It is monotypic, being represented by the single species, Pluscula cuica.

== Distribution ==
This species occurs off São Paulo, Brazil.
