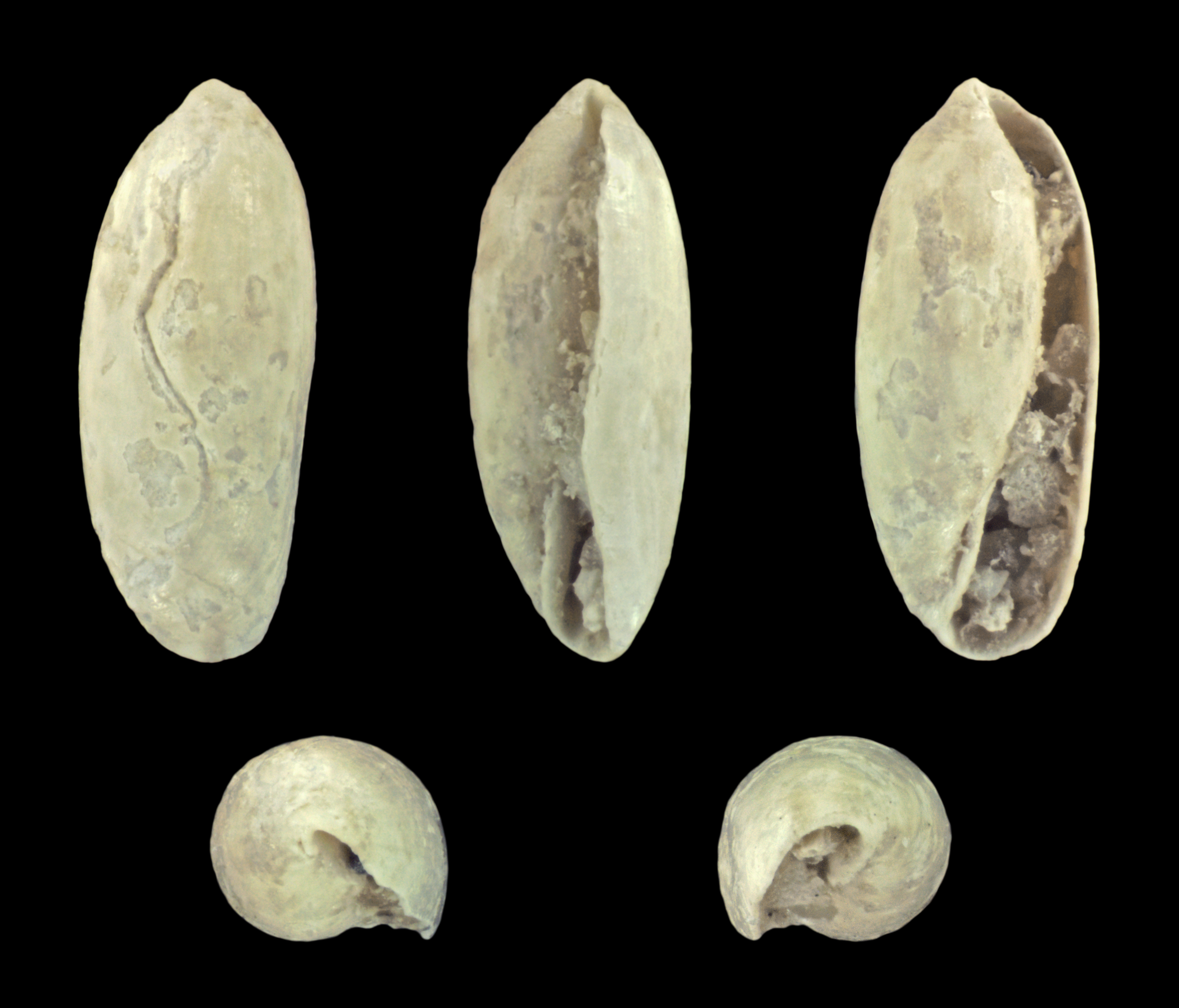
- Seed shrimp

Scientific classification
- Domain: Eukaryota
- Kingdom: Animalia
- Phylum: Mollusca
- Class: Gastropoda
- Order: Cephalaspidea
- Family: Rhizoridae
- Genus: Volvulella; Newton, 1891

= Volvulella =

Genus of sea snails

Volvulella is a genus of gastropods belonging to the family Rhizoridae.

The genus has almost cosmopolitan distribution.

Species:

- Volvulella acuminata (Bruguière, 1792)
- Volvulella angustata (A.Adams, 1850)
- Volvulella attenuata (A.Adams, 1862)
- Volvulella californica Dall, 1919
- Volvulella cannada Ihering, 1907
- Volvulella catharia Dall, 1919
- Volvulella compacta (Melvill, 1906)
- Volvulella cylichnoides (Pilsbry & Johnson, 1917) Pilsbry & Johnson, 1917
- Volvulella cylindrella (A.Adams, 1862)
- Volvulella cylindrica (Carpenter, 1864)
- Volvulella cylindrica (Gabb, 1872) Gabb, 1872
- Volvulella eburnea (A.Adams, 1850)
- Volvulella exilis (Thiele, 1925)
- Volvulella flavotincta (E.von Martens, 1904)
- Volvulella fortis (Thiele, 1925)
- Volvulella fulmeniculum (Marwick, 1931)
- Volvulella gluma Keen, 1943
- Volvulella ischnatracta Pilsbry, 1930
- Volvulella joaquinensis Addicott, 1970
- Volvulella kinokuniana (Habe, 1946)
- Volvulella lenis (Thiele, 1925)
- Volvulella marwicki (Bartrum & Powell, 1928)
- Volvulella mecyntea (Melvill, 1912)
- Volvulella micratracta Brown & Pilsbry, 1912
- Volvulella minuta (Bush, 1885)
- Volvulella multistriata Valdés, 2008
- Volvulella mutabilis (Barnard, 1963)
- Volvulella nesentus (Finlay, 1926)
- Volvulella onoae Valdés, 2008
- Volvulella opalina (A.Adams, 1862)
- Volvulella ovulina (A.Adams, 1850)
- Volvulella panamica Dall, 1919
- Volvulella paupercula (R.B.Watson, 1883)
- Volvulella persimilis (Mörch, 1875)
- Volvulella pia (Thiele, 1925)
- Volvulella radiola (A.Adams, 1862)
- Volvulella reflexa (Hutton, 1885)
- Volvulella rostrata (A.Adams, 1850)
- Volvulella sculpturata Minichev, 1971
- Volvulella spectabilis (A.Adams, 1862)
- Volvulella striatula (A.Adams, 1862)
- Volvulella suavis (Thiele, 1925)
- Volvulella sulcata (R.B.Watson, 1883)
- Volvulella texasiana Harry, 1967
- Volvulella tokunagai (Makiyama, 1927)
- Volvulella tragula (Hedley, 1903)
- Volvulella tritica (Olsson & Harbison, 1953) Olsson & Harbison, 1953
- Volvulella truncata Dell, 1956
