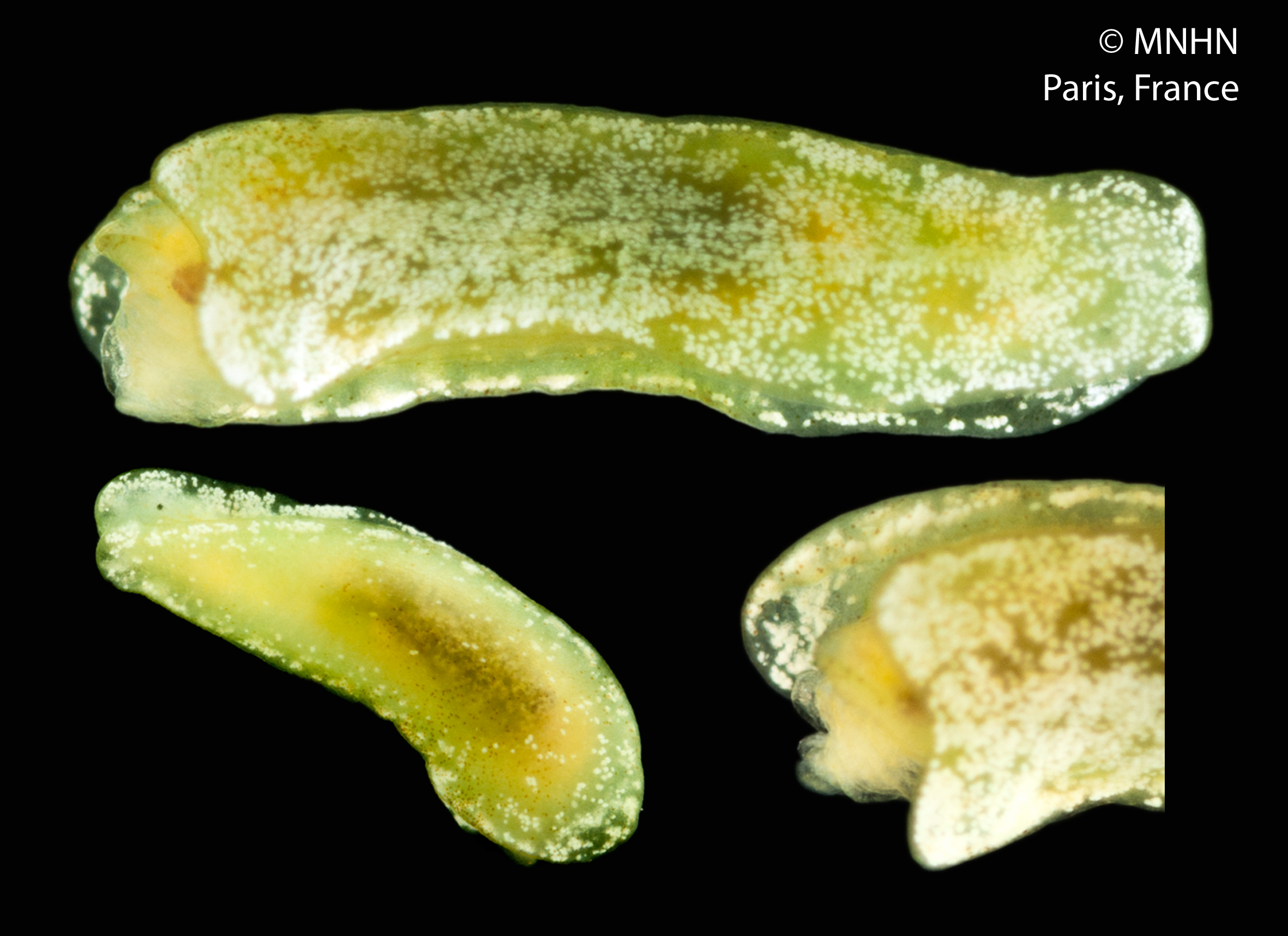
- Karukerina antola (specimen at MNHN, Paris)

Scientific classification
- Kingdom: Animalia
- Phylum: Mollusca
- Class: Gastropoda
- Subterclass: Tectipleura
- Order: Runcinida
- Superfamily: Runcinoidea
- Family: Runcinidae; H. Adams & A. Adams, 1854

Synonyms
- Ildicidae Burn, 1963; Peltidae Vayssière, 1885

= Runcinidae =

Family of gastropods

Runcinidae is a family of medium-sized sea slugs, marine opisthobranch gastropod mollusks. They are headshield slugs, in the superfamily Runcinoidea (according to the taxonomy of the Gastropoda by Bouchet & Rocroi, 2005).

This family has no subfamilies according to the taxonomy of the Gastropoda by Bouchet & Rocroi, 2005.

== Genera ==
- Edmundsina Ortea, 2013
- Ildica Bergh, 1889
- Karukerina Ortea, 2013
- Lapinura Er. Marcus & Ev. Marcus, 1970
- Metaruncina Baba, 1967
- Pseudoilbia M. C. Miller & Rudman, 1968
- Rfemsia Chernyshev, 1999
- Runcina Forbes [in Forbes & Hanley], 1851
- Runcinella Odhner, 1924
- Runcinida Burn, 1963

Genera brought into synonymy

- Pelta Quatrefages, 1844: synonym of Runcina Forbes [in Forbes & Hanley], 1851 (Invalid: placed on the Official Index by ICZN Opinion 811)
- Runnica M. C. Miller & Rudman, 1968: synonym of Runcina Forbes [in Forbes & Hanley], 1851
