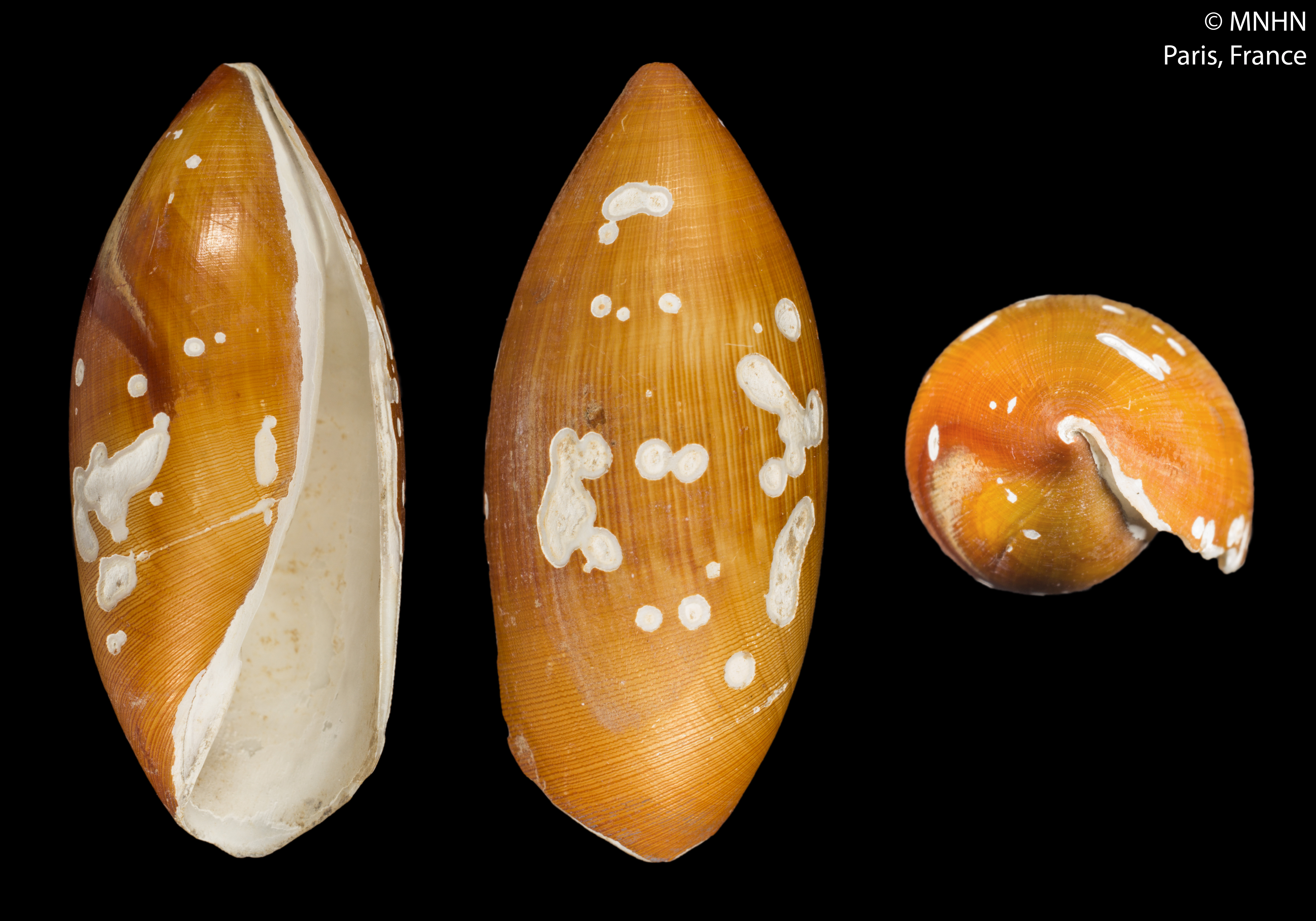
- Shell of Cylichnium mucronatum

Scientific classification
- Kingdom: Animalia
- Phylum: Mollusca
- Class: Gastropoda
- Order: Cephalaspidea
- Genus: Cylichnium; Dall, 1908

Type species
- Utriculus domitus Dall, 1889

Synonyms
- Cylichnella (Cylichnium) Dall, 1908; Volvulopsis Schepman, 1913

= Cylichnium =

Genus of molluscs

Cylichnium is a genus of very small sea snails, unassigned in a family in the order Cephalaspidea (bubble snails).

== Species ==
- Cylichnium africanum (Locard, 1897)
- Cylichnium ancillarioides (Schepman, 1913)
- Cylichnium chinense (G.-Y. Lin & W.-L. Wu, 1994)
- Cylichnium cylindrellum (Dall, 1908)
- Cylichnium domitum (Dall, 1908)
- Cylichnium guineense Thiele, 1925
- Cylichnium jucundum Thiele, 1925
- Cylichnium mucronatum Valdés, 2008
- Cylichnium nanum Valdés, 2008
- Cylichnium oliviforme (R. B. Watson, 1883)
- Cylichnium spatha (R. B. Watson, 1883)
- Cylichnium waldae Bouchet, 1975

Species brought into synonymy

- Cylichnium matsumotoi Habe, 1955: synonym of Cylichnium ancillarioides (Schepman, 1913)
- Cylichnium sumatrense Thiele, 1925: synonym of Cylichnium ancillarioides (Schepman, 1913)
