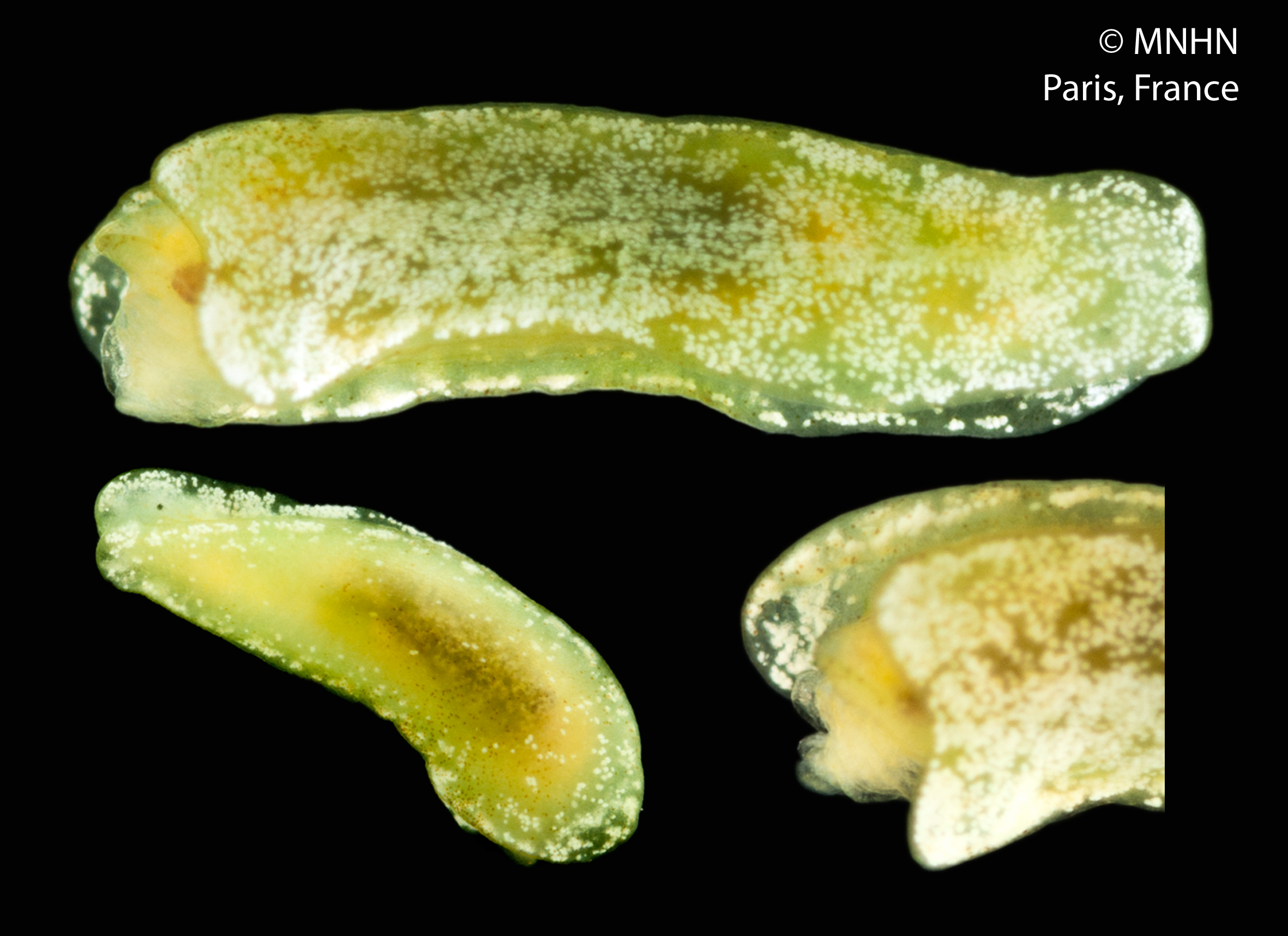

Scientific classification
- Kingdom: Animalia
- Phylum: Mollusca
- Class: Gastropoda
- Infraclass: Euthyneura
- Subterclass: Tectipleura
- Order: Runcinida
- Superfamily: Runcinoidea; H. Adams & A. Adams, 1854

= Runcinoidea =

Superfamily of gastropods

Runcinoidea is a taxonomic superfamily (according to the taxonomy of the Gastropoda by Bouchet & Rocroi, 2005) or a clade Runcinaecea (according to the Malaquias et al. (2009)) of sea slugs, marine gastropod mollusks in the order Runcinida

== Taxonomy ==
=== 2005 taxonomy ===
Runcinoidea was recognized as a superfamily in the clade Cephalaspidea, within the informal group Opisthobranchia in the taxonomy of the Gastropoda by Bouchet & Rocroi, 2005).

They also recognized two families, Runcinidae and Ilbiidae.

=== 2009 taxonomy ===
Malaquias et al. (2009) reinstated Runcinacea as a valid taxon outside the Cephalaspidea.

They also recognized two families Runcinidae (with genus Runcina) and Ilbiidae, but they did not mention superfamilies.

=== 2010 taxonomy ===
Jörger et al. 2010 moved Runcinacea to the Euopisthobranchia.

=== 2017 taxonomy ===
Runcinoidea was classified in the order Runcinida by the revised classification of the Gastropoda.

== Families ==
Families within the Runcinoidea include:

- Family Runcinidae H. Adams & A. Adams, 1854
- Family Ilbiidae Burn, 1963

Synonyms

- Ildicidae Burn, 1963: synonym of Runcinidae H. Adams & A. Adams, 1854
- Peltidae Vayssière, 1885: synonym of Runcinidae H. Adams & A. Adams, 1854
