= Philinoglossidae =

Scientific classification
- Kingdom: Animalia
- Phylum: Mollusca
- Class: Gastropoda
- Superfamily: Philinoidea
- Family: Philinoglossidae; Hertling, 1932

Synonyms
- Plusculidae Franc, 1968

Family of gastropods

Philinoglossidae is a family of marine snails, gastropod molluscs in the superfamily Philinoidea.

== Genera ==
The following genera are recognized in the family Philinoglossidae:

- Abavopsis Salvini-Plawen, 1973
- Philinoglossa Hertling, 1932
- Pluscula Er. Marcus, 1953
- Sapha Marcus, 1959
