= Mnestiidae =

Scientific classification
- Kingdom: Animalia
- Phylum: Mollusca
- Class: Gastropoda
- Order: Cephalaspidea
- Superfamily: Cylichnoidea
- Family: Mnestiidae; Oskars, Bouchet & Malaquias, 2015

Family of gastropods

Mnestiidae is a family of gastropods belonging to the order Cephalaspidea.

Genera:

- Mnestia H. Adams & A. Adams, 1854
- Ventomnestia Iredale, 1936
