= Colinatys =

Scientific classification
- Domain: Eukaryota
- Kingdom: Animalia
- Phylum: Mollusca
- Class: Gastropoda
- Order: Cephalaspidea
- Family: Colinatydidae
- Genus: Colinatys; Ortea, Moro & Espinosa, 2013
- Species: C. alayoi

Binomial name
- Colinatys alayoi (Espinosa & Ortea, 2004)

Genus of gastropods

Colinatys is a monotypic genus of gastropods belonging to the monotypic family Colinatydidae. The only species is Colinatys alayoi.
