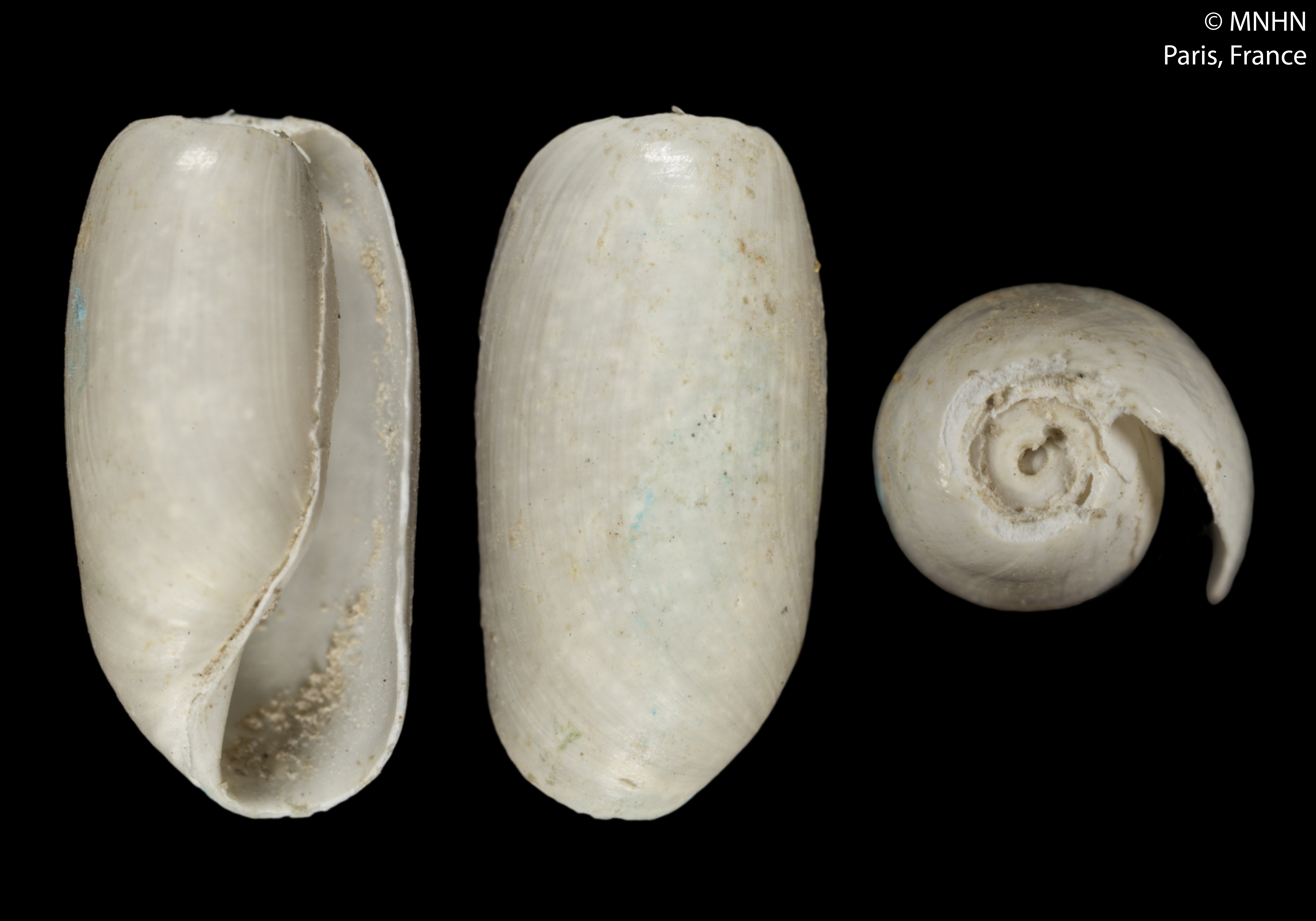
- Shell of Cylichna lemchei (holotype at MNHN, Paris)

Scientific classification
- Kingdom: Animalia
- Phylum: Mollusca
- Class: Gastropoda
- Infraclass: Euthyneura
- Subterclass: Tectipleura
- Order: Cephalaspidea
- Superfamily: Cylichnoidea; H. Adams & A. Adams, 1854

Families
- See text

Synonyms
- Diaphanoidea Odhner, 1914 (1857)

= Cylichnoidea =

Superfamily of gastropods

Cylichnoidea is a superfamily of sea snails or bubble snails, marine gastropod molluscs in the order Cylichnidae, the "chalice bubble snails".

== Families ==
- Colinatydidae Oskars, Bouchet & Malaquias, 2015
- Cylichnidae H. Adams & A. Adams, 1854
- Diaphanidae Odhner, 1914 (1857)
- Eoscaphandridae Chaban & Kijashko, 2016
- Mnestiidae Oskars, Bouchet & Malaquias, 2015

Taxon inquirendum

- Notodiaphanidae Thiele, 1931

Synonyms

- Amphisphyridae Gray, 1857: synonym of Diaphanidae Odhner, 1914 (1857)
