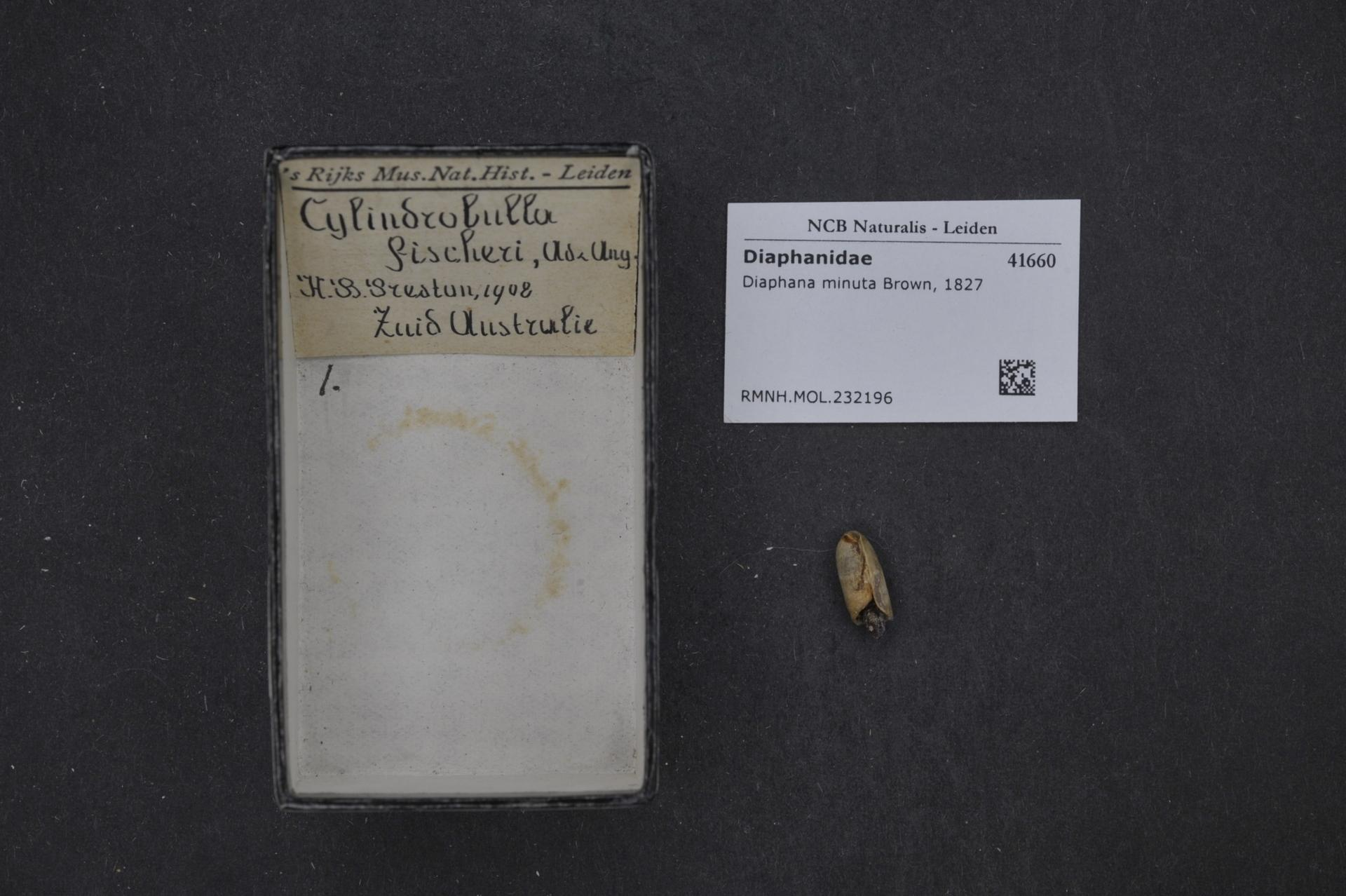
- Diaphana minuta.

Scientific classification
- Kingdom: Animalia
- Phylum: Mollusca
- Class: Gastropoda
- Order: Cephalaspidea
- Superfamily: Cylichnoidea
- Family: Diaphanidae; Odhner, 1922

= Diaphanidae =

Family of gastropods

Diaphanidae is a family of small marine gastropod mollusks belonging to the order Cephalaspidea, commonly known as headshield slugs and bubble snails. This family is characterized by its members’ delicate, often translucent shells and their adaptation to a variety of marine environments.

== Taxonomy and classification ==
The family Diaphanidae falls under the class Gastropoda, subclass Heterobranchia, and order Cephalaspidea. The type genus for this family is Diaphana, which was first described by T. Brown in 1827.

== Morphology ==
Members of the Diaphanidae family typically possess small, fragile shells that are often globular in shape. These shells are sometimes referred to as “paper bubble” shells due to their thin and delicate nature. The body of these gastropods is usually soft and can retract into the shell for protection.

== Habitat and distribution ==
Diaphanidae species are found in a wide range of marine environments, from shallow coastal waters to deeper oceanic regions. They have a nearly cosmopolitan distribution, meaning they can be found in various parts of the world.

== Notable species ==
Some notable species within the Diaphanidae family include:

- Diaphana abyssalis Schiøtte, 1998
- Diaphana anderssoni (Strebel, 1908)
- Diaphana brazieri (Angas, 1877)
- Diaphana californica (Dall, 1919)
- Diaphana caribaea (Espinosa, Ortea & Fernández-Garcés, 2001)

== Ecological role ==
Diaphanidae gastropods play a significant role in their ecosystems as both prey and grazers. They feed on a variety of small organisms and detritus, contributing to the nutrient cycle within their habitats.
