= Runcinida =

Scientific classification
- Kingdom: Animalia
- Phylum: Mollusca
- Class: Gastropoda
- Subclass: Heterobranchia
- Infraclass: Euthyneura
- Subterclass: Tectipleura
- Order: Runcinida

Synonyms
- Runcinacea (change in suffix)

Order of gastropods

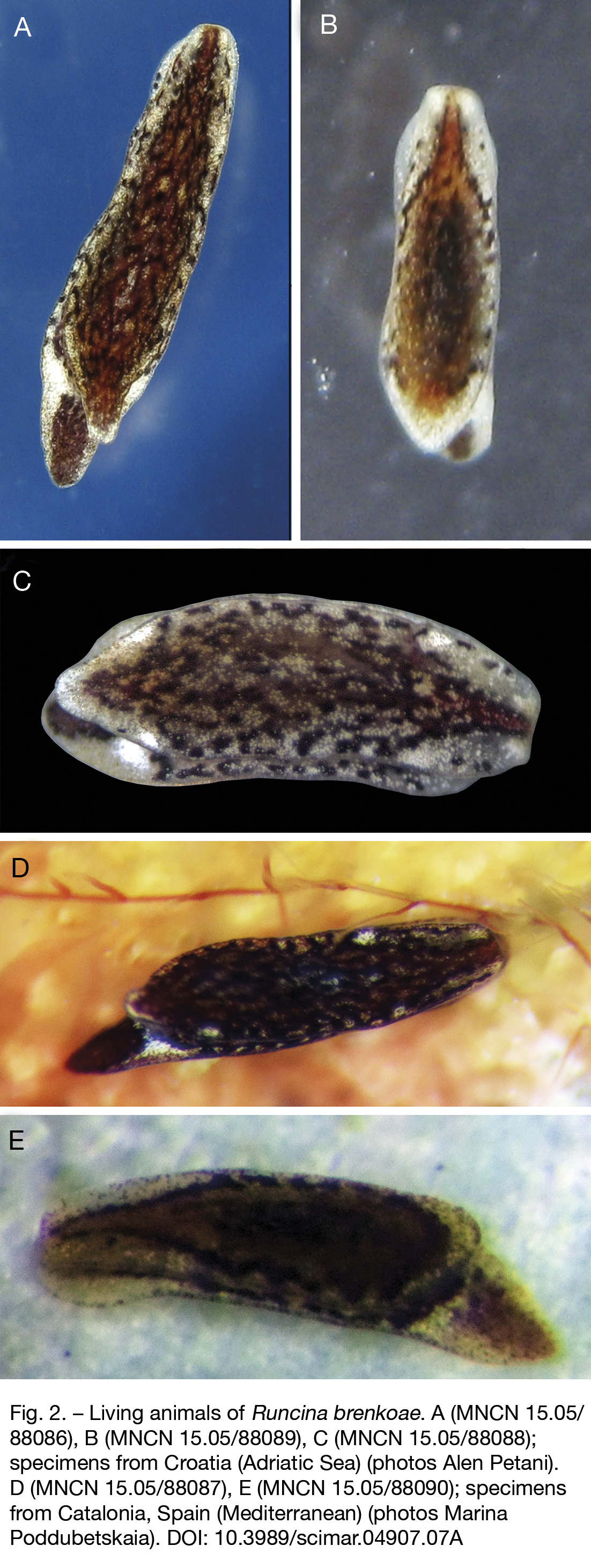
Runcina brenkoae specimens

Runcinida is a order of medium-sized sea slugs, marine opisthobranch gastropod mollusks.

== Superfamilies ==
- Runcinoidea H. Adams & A. Adams, 1854
