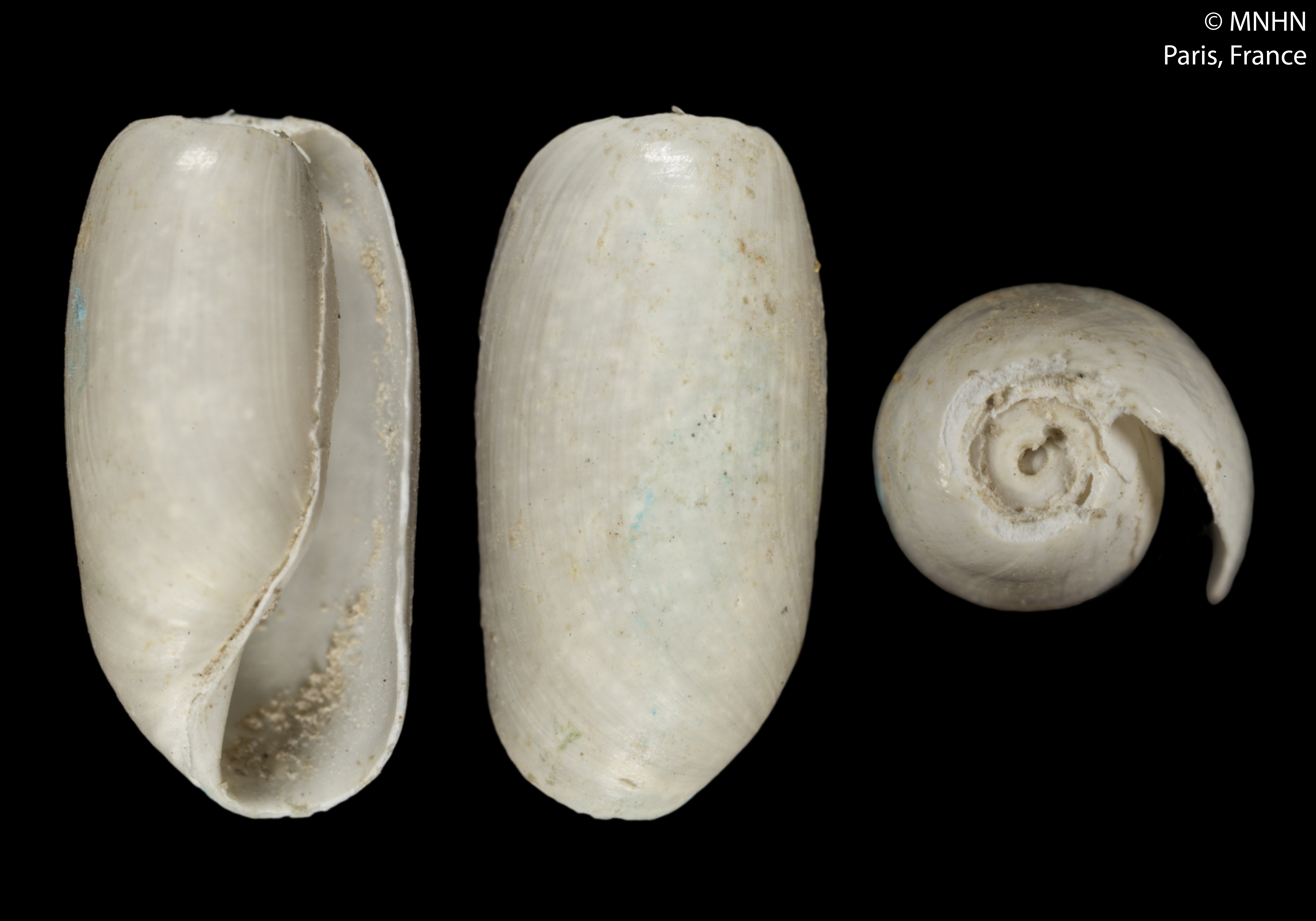
- Shell of Cylichna lemchei (holotype at MNHN, Paris)

Scientific classification
- Kingdom: Animalia
- Phylum: Mollusca
- Class: Gastropoda
- Subterclass: Tectipleura
- Order: Cephalaspidea
- Superfamily: Cylichnoidea
- Family: Cylichnidae; H. Adams & A. Adams, 1854

Genera
- See text

Synonyms
- Semiretusinae Chaban, 2016· accepted, alternate representation; Toledoniinae Warén, 1989· accepted, alternate representation

= Cylichnidae =

Family of gastropods

Cylichnidae, common name the "chalice bubble snails" or "canoe bubble snails" is a family of sea snails or bubble snails, marine gastropod mollusks in the superfamily Cylichnoidea.

== Taxonomy ==
=== 2005 taxonomy ===
This family has been classified within the clade Cephalaspidea, itself belonging to the informal group Opisthobranchia (according to the taxonomy of the Gastropoda by Bouchet & Rocroi, 2005). The family Cylichnidae has no subfamilies (according to the taxonomy of the Gastropoda by Bouchet & Rocroi, 2005). Synonyms of Cylichnidae have included: Scaphandridae G. O. Sars, 1878; Tornatinidae P. Fischer, 1883; Acteocinidae Dall, 1913 and Triclidae Winckworth, 1932.

=== 2009 taxonomy ===
Malaquias et al. (2009) have reinstated Scaphandridae as a valid family.

== Genera ==
Genera within the family Cylichnidae include:

- Adamnestia Iredale, 1936
- Bogasonia Warén, 1989
- Cylichna Lovén, 1846 - type genus
- † Cylichnania Marwick, 1931
- Cylichnella Gabb, 1873
- Cylichnoides Minichev, 1977
- Decorifer Iredale, 1937
- Mamillocylichna Nordsieck, 1972
- Paracteocina Minichev, 1966
- Semiretusa Thiele, 1925
- Sphaerocylichna Thiele, 1925
- Toledonia Dall, 1902
- Truncacteocina Kuroda & Habe, 1955

Genera brought into synonymy

- Actaeocina [sic]: synonym of Acteocina J. E. Gray, 1847
- Bullinella Newton, 1891: synonym of Cylichna Lovén, 1846
- Clistaxis Cossmann, 1895: synonym of Cylichna Lovén, 1846
- Cryptaxis Jeffreys, 1883: synonym of Cylichna Lovén, 1846
- Cychlinella [sic]: synonym of Cylichnella Gabb, 1873
- Cylichlinella [sic]: synonym of Cylichnella Gabb, 1873
- Cylindrella Swainson, 1840: synonym of Cylichna Lovén, 1846
- Didontoglossa Annandale, 1924: synonym of Tornatina A. Adams, 1850: synonym of Acteocina Gray, 1847
- Eocylichna Kuroda & Habe, 1952: synonym of Cylichna Lovén, 1846
- Cylichnoides Minichev, 1977: synonym of Cylichna Lovén, 1846
- Tornastra Ev. Marcus, 1977: synonym of Cylichnella Gabb, 1873
- Tornatina A. Adams in Sowerby, 1850: synonym of Acteocina Gray, 1847
- Utriculastra Thiele, 1925: synonym of Cylichnella Gabb, 1873
