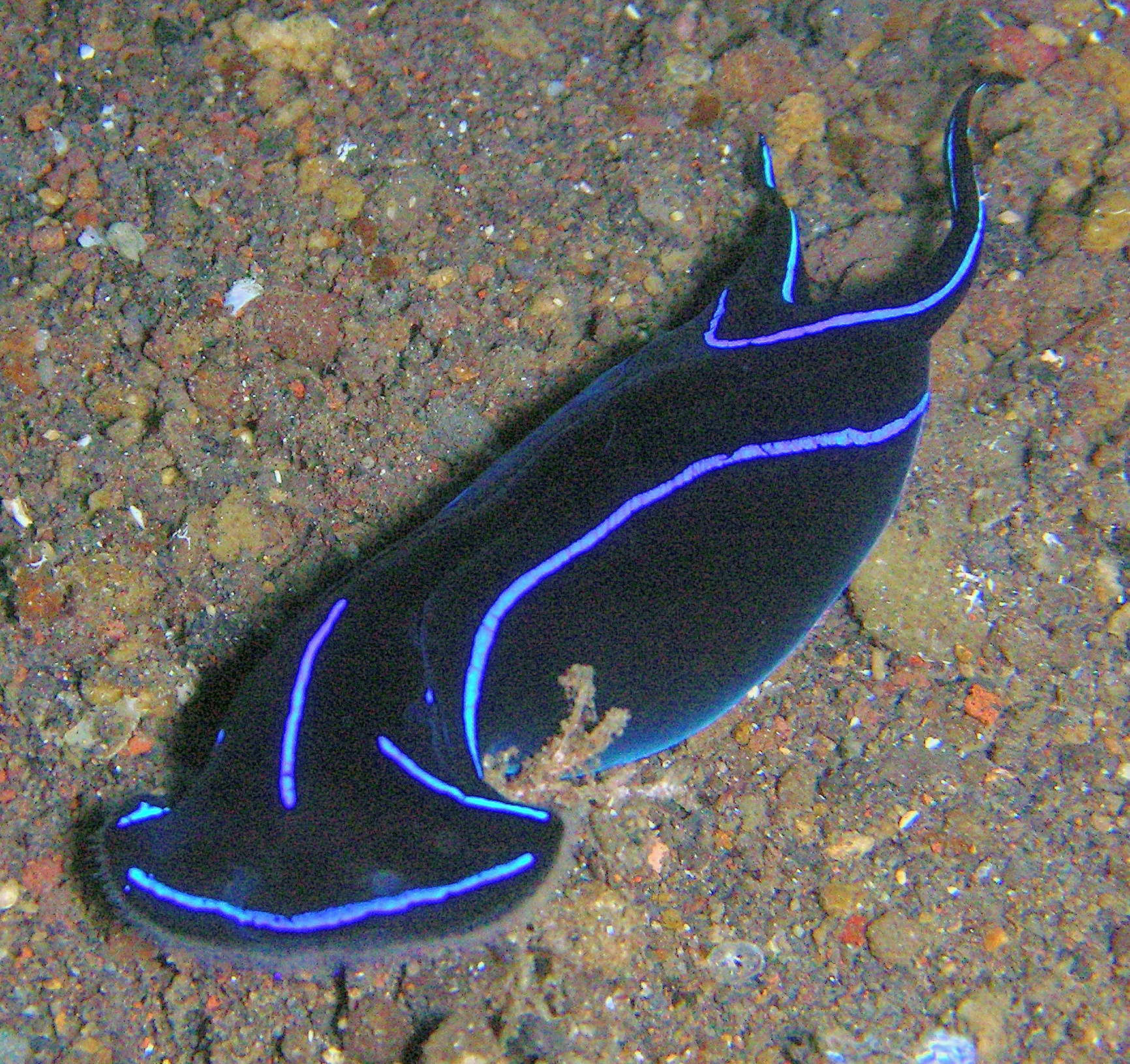
- A live individual of Chelidonura varians in the family Aglajidae, head end towards the lower left

Scientific classification
- Kingdom: Animalia
- Phylum: Mollusca
- Class: Gastropoda
- Subclass: Heterobranchia
- Infraclass: Euthyneura
- Subterclass: Tectipleura
- Order: Cephalaspidea

Superfamilies
- See text

= Cephalaspidea =

Order of gastropods

The order Cephalaspidea, also known as the headshield slugs and bubble snails, is a major taxon of sea slugs and bubble snails, marine gastropod mollusks within the larger clade Euopisthobranchia. Bubble shells is another common name for these families of marine gastropods, some of which have thin bubble-like shells. This clade contains more than 600 species.

Members of this worldwide clade used to be considered the most ancestral of the opisthobranchs, but now they are considered as derived from and specialized members of the Euthyneura Spengel, 1881.

Headshield slugs are the most morphologically diverse group of all the opisthobranchs.

== Anatomy ==
The vast majority of headshield slugs possess a shell, although it may be reduced or internal. They have a well-developed headshield, a characteristic broadening at the head, which is used to plow beneath the surface of the sand. This headshield prevents the sand entering the mantle cavity. There is a muscular foot with or without parapodia (fleshy wing-like flaps).

=== Life habits and related anatomical structures ===
Headshield slugs often live just beneath the surface of the sand and can also be seen crawling on rocks. They have well-developed sensory structures to detect prey, which may be other opisthobranchs, polychaetes or bristleworms and foraminiferans. Several species are voracious carnivores.

Members of the brightly colored genus Chelidonura also have well-developed eyes on the anterior end of the head and bundles of sensory cilia around the mouth. With these cilia they are able to track their prey by following the victim's mucous trail.

The Hancock's organ is a chemosensory organ situated between the foot and the headshield. It plays a role in olfactory and sensory detection. It is visible as a dark brown pit at the base of the right rhinophore.

== Taxonomy ==
The taxonomy of the shelled cephalaspideans, the bubble snails, like that of many shelled mollusks, used to be based very simply on shell characteristics. But because there are some similarities in shell morphology throughout this group, more recently taxonomists have taken other anatomical characteristics into consideration, such as the radula, gizzard, penis, and Hancock's organ.

In 2015 a new study based on molecular phylogenetics has changed significantly the taxonomy of the Cephalaspidea. The monophyly of the Cephalaspidea was confirmed, but the families Cylichnidae, Diaphanidae, Haminoeidae, Philinidae, and Retusidae were found non-monophyletic. This had led to the creation of new families ((Alacuppidae, Colinatydidae, Colpodaspididae, Mnestiidae, Philinorbidae) ) and one new genus (Alacuppa). Two family names (Acteocinidae, Laonidae) and two genera (Laona, Philinorbis) are reinstated as valid

=== Linnaean taxonomy ===
- Suborder Cephalaspidea P. Fischer, 1883
  - Superfamily Acteonoidea D'Orbigny, 1835
  - Superfamily Bulloidea Lamarck, 1801
  - Superfamily Cylindrobulloidea Thiele, 1931 – These are now included in the suborder Sacoglossa
  - Superfamily Diaphanoidea Odhner, 1914
  - Superfamily Haminoeoidea Pilsbry, 1895
  - Superfamily Philinoidea J.E. Gray, 1850
  - Superfamily Ringiculoidea Philippi, 1853

=== 2005 taxonomy ===
In the taxonomy of Bouchet & Rocroi (2005), the clade Cephalaspidea is arranged as follows:

- Superfamily Bulloidea: family Bullidae
- Superfamily Diaphanoidea: families Diaphanidae and Notodiaphanidae,
- Superfamily Haminoeoidea: families Haminoeidae, Bullactidae and Smaragdinellidae
- Superfamily Philinoidea: families Philinidae, Aglajidae, Cylichnidae, Gastropteridae, Philinoglossidae, Plusculidae and Retusidae
- Superfamily Runcinoidea: families Runcinidae and Ilbiidae

The superfamily Acteonoidea has been included into the new Informal Group "Lower Heterobranchia" and the superfamily Cylindrobulloidea becomes part of the Group Cylindrobullida.

=== 2009 taxonomy ===
Malaquias et al. (2009) have rearranged taxonomy of Cephalaspidea sensu lato:

- reinstated Architectibranchia
- reinstated Runcinacea as a valid name outside Cephalaspidea.
- reinstated Scaphandridae as a valid family.
- they did not use superfamilies in the classification scheme.

The taxonomy of Cephalaspidea sensu lato by Malaquias et al. (2009) is arranged as follows (there are listed genera under molecular analysis; not analyzed families are under "incertae sedis"):

Architectibranchia Haszprunar, 1985

- Family Acteonidae d'Orbigny, 1843 – Acteon, Mexacteon, Pupa
- Family Aplustridae Gray, 1847 – Hydatina, Micromelo
- Family Bullinidae Gray, 1850 incertae sedis
- Family Ringiculidae Philippi, 1853 incertae sedis
- Family Notodiaphanidae Thiele, 1931 incertae sedis

Runcinacea Burn, 1963

- Family Runcinidae H. Adams & A. Adams, 1854 – Runcina
- Family Ilbiidae Burn, 1963 incertae sedis

Cephalaspidea Fischer, 1887 – This means Cephalaspidea sensu stricto

- Family Diaphanidae Odhner, 1914 – Diaphana, genus Colpodaspis is incertae sedis
- Family Cylichnidae H. Adams & A. Adams, 1854 – Cylichna
- Family Scaphandridae G. O Sars, 1878 – Scaphander
- Family Retusidae Thiele, 1925 – Retusa, Pyrunculus
- Family Rhizoridae Dell, 1952 – Volvulella
- Family Bullidae Gray, 1827 – Bulla
- Family Philinidae Gray, 1850 – Philine
- Family Aglajidae Pilsbry, 1895–96 – Aglaja, Chelidonura, Navanax, Odontoglaja, Philinopsis
- Family Philinoglossidae Hertling, 1932 – Philinoglossa
- Family Gastropteridae Swainson, 1840 – Gastropteron, Sagaminopteron, Siphopteron
- Family Plusculidae Odhner, 1968 incertae sedis
- Family Haminoeidae Pilsbry, 1893 – Atys, Haminoea, Phanerophthalmus, Smaragdinella, Ventomnestia incertae sedis
- Family Bullactidae Thiele, 1826 incertae sedis

=== 2010 taxonomy ===
Subsequently, Malaquias (2010) moved Bullacta exarata (formerly the only member of Bullactidae) into the family Haminoeidae.

Jörger et al. (2010) moved Cephalaspidea sensu stricto and Runcinacea into the Euopisthobranchia and they confirmed the placement of Acteonoidea within the Lower Heterobranchia. All families of Architectibranchia were already within the Lower Heterobranchia in the taxonomy of Bouchet & Rocroi, except for the Notodiaphanidae, which has been placed in the Lower Heterobranchia since 2010, in order that the Architectibranchia can be considered to be monophyletic.

=== 2015 taxonomy ===
The publication by Oskars T.R., Bouchet P. & Malaquias M.A. (2015). A new phylogeny of the Cephalaspidea (Gastropoda: Heterobranchia) based on expanded taxon sampling and gene markers. in the journal Molecular Phylogenetics and Evolution. 89 came to the following conclusion, with the creation of new families

- Acteocinidae Dall, 1913 – type genus: Acteocina Gray, 1847
- Alacuppidae Oskars, Bouchet, and Malaquias, 2015 – type genus: Alacuppa Oskars, Bouchet, and Malaquias, 2015
- Mnestiidae Oskars, Bouchet, and Malaquias, 2015 – type genus: Mnestia H. Adams and A. Adams, 1854
- Colpodaspididae Oskars, Bouchet, and Malaquias, 2015 – type genus: Colpodaspis M. Sars, 1870
- Colinatydidae Oskars, Bouchet, and Malaquias, 2015 – type genus: Colinatys Ortea, Moro and Espinosa, 2013
- Philinorbidae Oskars, Bouchet, and Malaquias, 2015 – type genus: Philinorbis Habe, 1950
- Laonidae Pruvot-Fol, 1954 (formerly Laoninae) – type genus: Laona A. Adams, 1865
- [unassigned] Cephalaspidea (temporary name) with the genera Cylichnium Dall, 1908, Micratys Habe, 1952 and Noalda Iredale, 1936.

The superfamily Bulloidea was not supported in the Bayesian phylogenetic hypothesis and Diaphanoidea was found polyphyletic. The superfamilies Haminoeoidea and Philinoidea were accepted. The composition of each of the superfamilies was drastically rearranged.

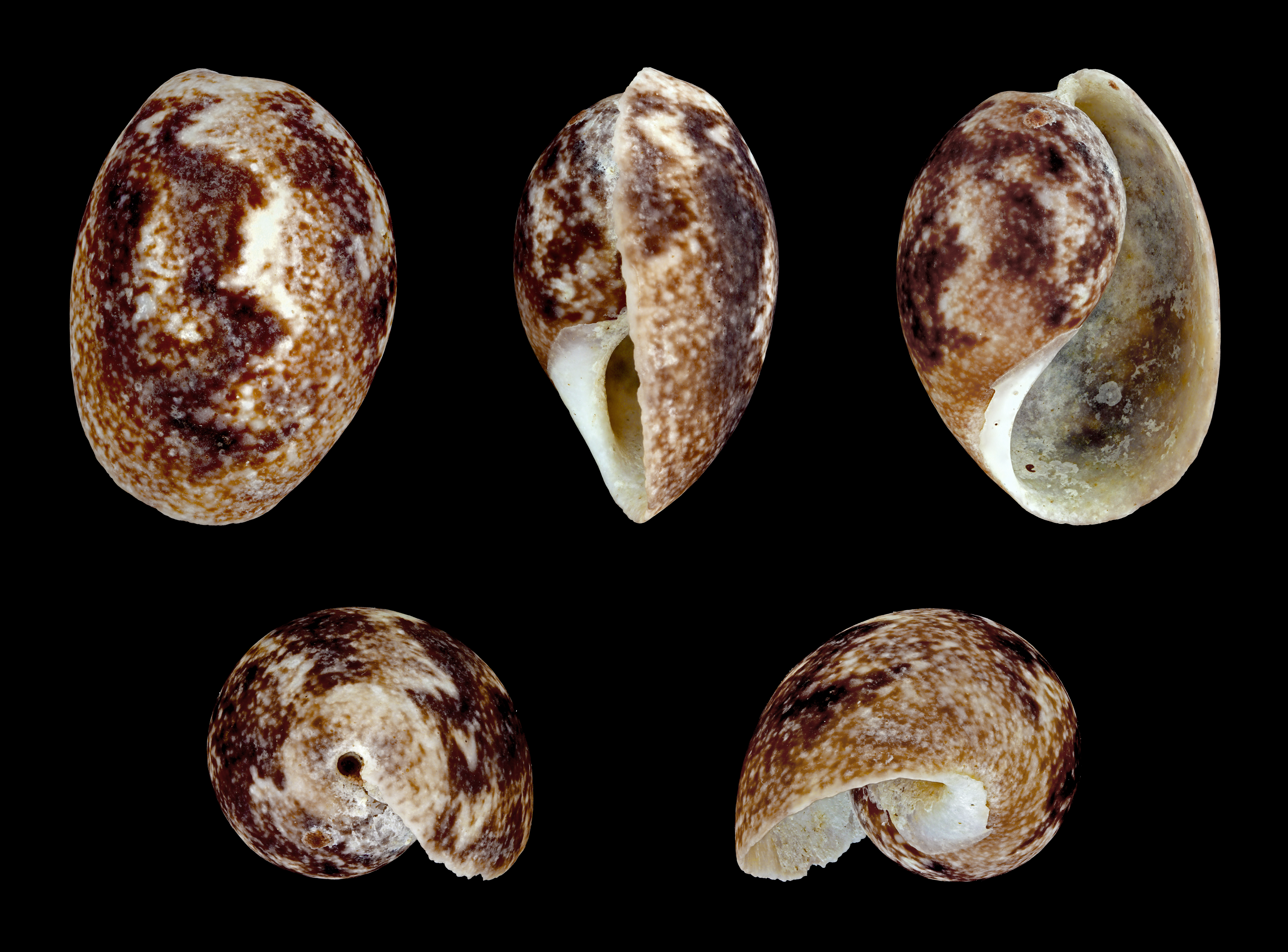
Bulla ampulla (Bullidae).

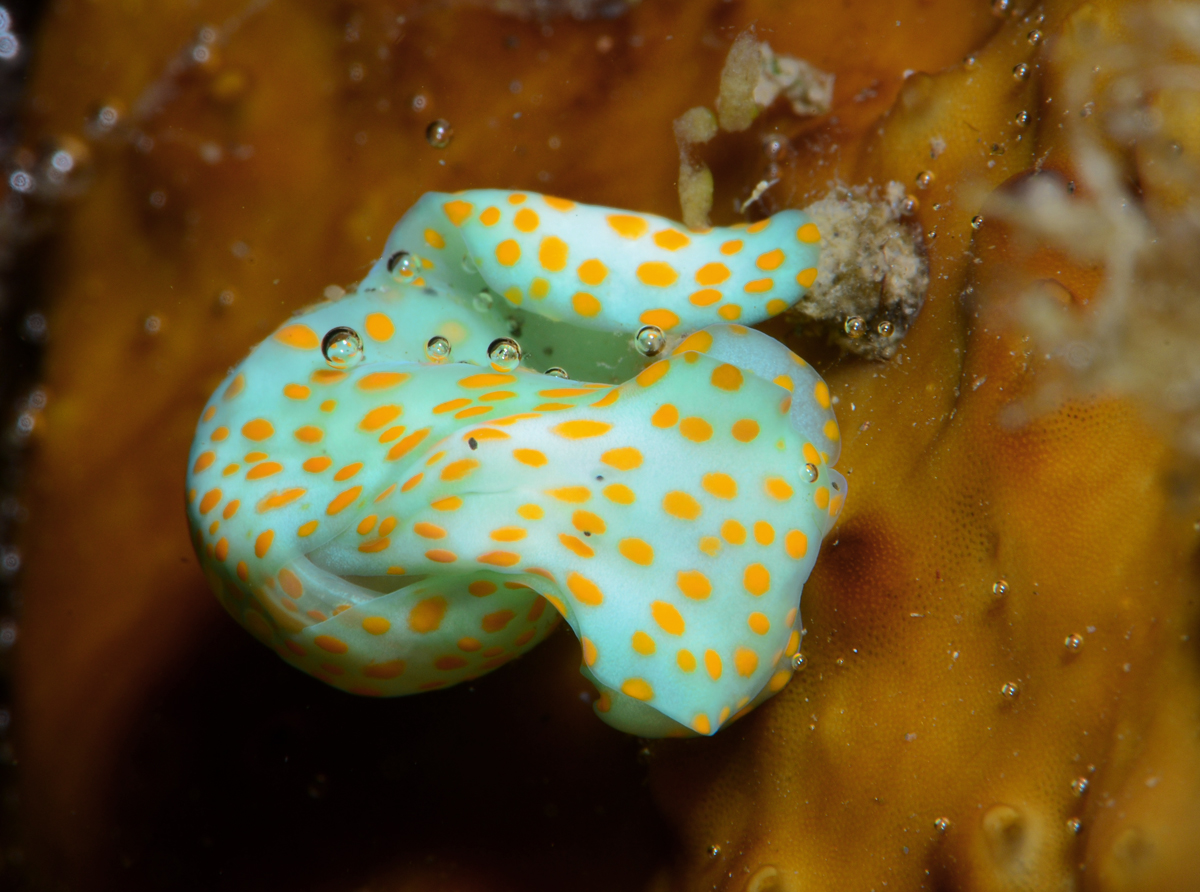
Lamprohaminoea cymbalum (Haminoeidae).

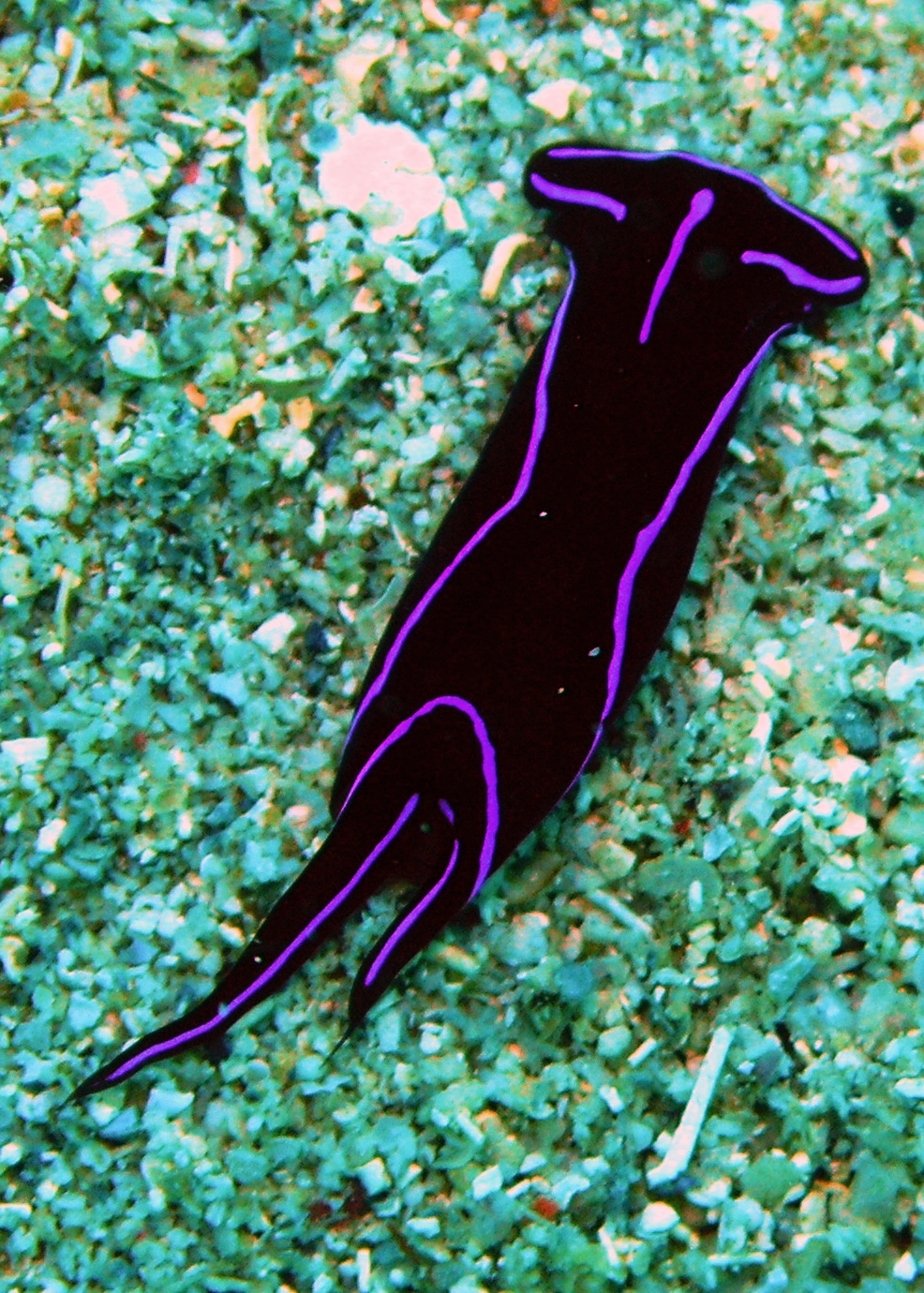
Chelidonura varians (Aglajidae).

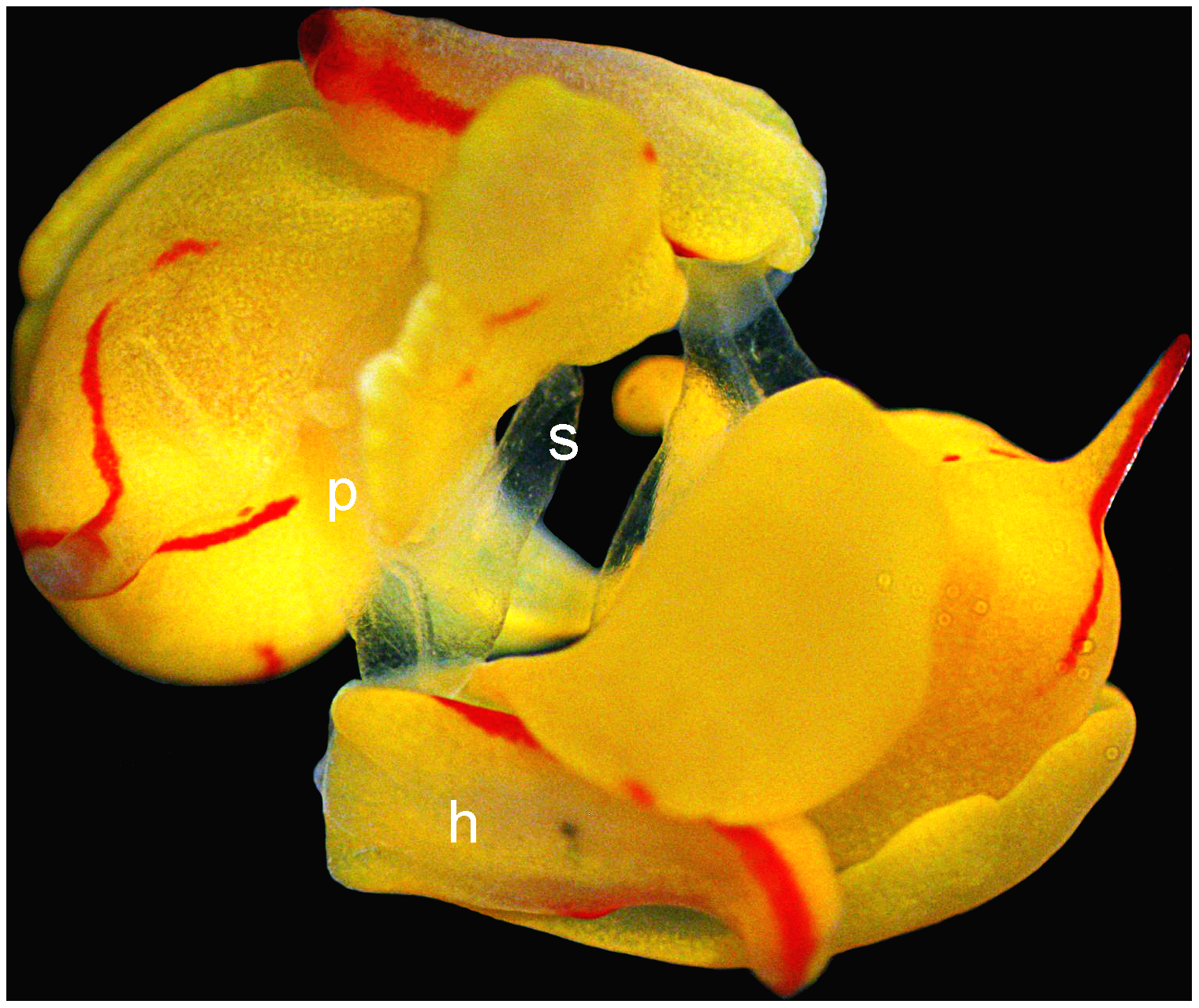
Couple of Siphopteron quadrispinosum (Gastropteridae).
