= Aglaja (gastropod) =

- Aglaja ocelligera

Scientific classification
- Kingdom: Animalia
- Phylum: Mollusca
- Class: Gastropoda
- Order: Cephalaspidea
- Family: Aglajidae
- Genus: Aglaja; Renier, 1807

Species
- 7 species (see text)

Synonyms
- Aglaia [Renier], [1804] unavailable name (placed on the Official Index in ICZN Opinion 1079); Doridium Meckel, 1809; Doridium (Aglaja) Renier, 1807

Genus of gastropods

Aglaja is a genus of sea slugs, marine opisthobranch gastropod molluscs in the family Aglajidae. The genus is found in all warm and temperate oceans.

== Species ==
The following species Are recognized:

- Aglaja berrieri (Dieuzeide, 1935)
- Aglaja ceylonica Bergh, 1900 (taxon inquirendum)
- Aglaja laurentiana (R. B. Watson, 1897)
- Aglaja minuta Pruvot-Fol, 1953
- Aglaja ocelligera (Bergh, 1894)
- Aglaja tricolorata Renier, 1807
- Aglaja unsa Ev. Marcus & Er. Marcus, 1969

Synonyms

- Aglaja bakeri MacFarland, 1924: synonym of Navanax inermis (J. G. Cooper, 1862)
- Aglaja cyanea (E. von Martens, 1879): synonym of Philinopsis speciosa Pease, 1860
- Aglaja depicta Renier, 1807: synonym of Philinopsis depicta (Renier, 1807)
- Aglaja diomedea (Bergh, 1894): synonym of Melanochlamys diomedea (Bergh, 1894)
- Aglaja dubia O'Donoghue, 1929: synonym of Philinopsis dubia (O'Donoghue, 1929) (original combination)
- Aglaja evelinae (Er. Marcus, 1955): synonym of Navanax gemmatus (Mörch, 1863)
- Aglaja ezoensis Baba, 1957: synonym of Melanochlamys ezoensis (Baba, 1957) (original combination)
- Aglaja felis Er. Marcus & Ev. Marcus, 1970: synonym of Nakamigawaia felis (Er. Marcus & Ev. Marcus, 1970) (original combination)
- Aglaja fidelis (J. E. Gray, 1834): synonym of Monadenia fidelis (J. E. Gray, 1834)
- Aglaja fulvipunctata (Baba, 1938): synonym of Biuve fulvipunctata (Baba, 1938)
- Aglaja gemmata (Mörch, 1863): synonym of Navanax gemmatus (Mörch, 1863)
- Aglaja gigliolii Tapparone Canefri, 1874: synonym of Philinopsis gigliolii (Tapparone Canefri, 1874)
- Aglaja henri Burn, 1969: synonym of Melanochlamys queritor (Burn, 1957)
- Aglaja hummelincki Er. Marcus & Ev. Marcus, 1970: synonym of Camachoaglaja berolina (Er. Marcus & Ev. Marcus, 1970)
- Aglaja iwasai Hirase, 1936: synonym of Philinopsis speciosa Pease, 1860
- Aglaja lineolata H. Adams & A. Adams, 1854: synonym of Tubulophilinopsis lineolata (H. Adams & A. Adams, 1854) (original combination)
- Aglaja lorrainae Rudman, 1968: synonym of Melanochlamys lorrainae (Rudman, 1968) (original combination)
- Aglaja maderensis (R. B. Watson, 1897): synonym of Melanochlamys maderensis (R. B. Watson, 1897)
- Aglaja nana Steinberg & Jones, 1960: synonym of Melanochlamys diomedea (Bergh, 1894)
- Aglaja nuttalli Pilsbry, 1895: synonym of Philinopsis nuttalli (Pilsbry, 1895) (original combination)
- Aglaja orbignyana (Rochebrune, 1881): synonym of Navanax orbignyanus (Rochebrune, 1881)
- Aglaja orientalis Baba, 1949: synonym of Spinoaglaja orientalis (Baba, 1949) (original combination)
- Aglaja pelsunca Ev. Marcus & Er. Marcus, 1966: synonym of Philinopsis depicta (Renier, 1807)
- Aglaja phaeoreticulata Yonow, 1990: synonym of Tubulophilinopsis reticulata (Eliot, 1903)
- Aglaja pilsbryi (Eliot, 1900): synonym of Tubulophilinopsis pilsbryi (Eliot, 1900)
- Aglaja pusa Ev. Marcus & Er. Marcus, 1966: synonym of Philinopsis pusa (Ev. Marcus & Er. Marcus, 1966) (original combination)
- Aglaja queritor Burn, 1957: synonym of Melanochlamys queritor (Burn, 1957) (original combination)
- Aglaja quinza Ev. Marcus, 1979: synonym of Philinopsis quinza (Ev. Marcus, 1979) (original combination)
- Aglaja regiscorona Bertsch, 1972: synonym of Niparaya regiscorona (Bertsch, 1972) (original combination)
- Aglaja splendida Marcus, 1965: synonym of Philinopsis splendida (Risbec, 1951) - taxon inquirendum
- Aglaja taila Marcus Ev. & Er., 1966: synonym of Aglaja tricolorata Renier, 1807 (junior synonym)
- Aglaja taronga Allan, 1933: synonym of Philinopsis gigliolii (Tapparone Canefri, 1874)
- Aglaja troubridgensis Verco, 1909: synonym of Philinopsis troubridgensis (Verco, 1909) (original combination)
- Aglaja virgo Rudman, 1968: synonym of Melanochlamys virgo (Rudman, 1968): synonym of Philinopsis virgo (Rudman, 1968) (original combination)
