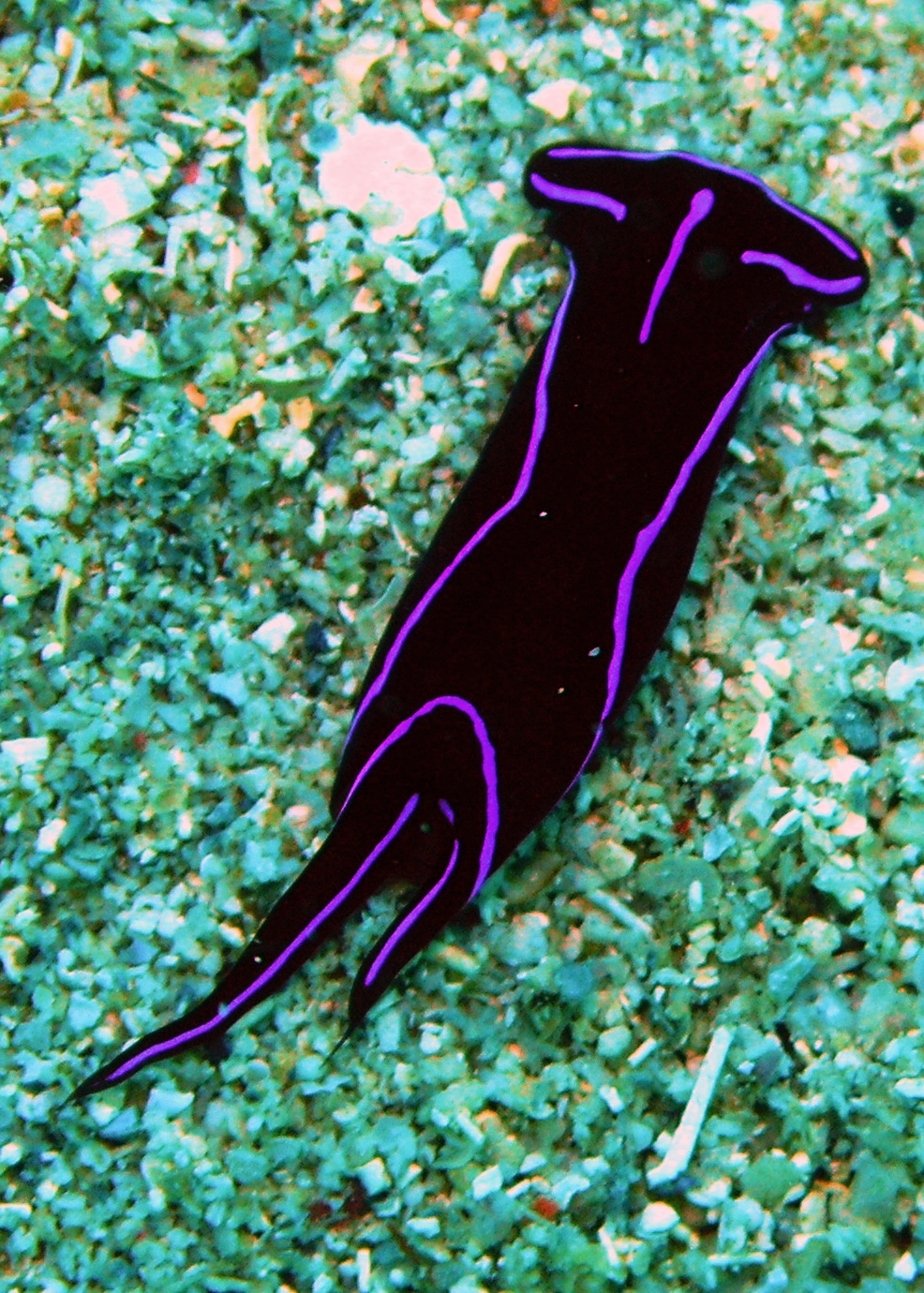
- Chelidonura varians

Scientific classification
- Kingdom: Animalia
- Phylum: Mollusca
- Class: Gastropoda
- Order: Cephalaspidea
- Superfamily: Philinoidea
- Family: Aglajidae
- Genus: Chelidonura; A. Adams, 1850

Type species
- Bulla hirundinina Quoy & Gaimard, 1833

Species
- See text

Synonyms
- Hirundella J. E. Gray, 1850

= Chelidonura =

Genus of gastropods

Chelidonura is a genus of small, sometimes colorful, sea slugs. These are headshield slugs or cephalaspideans, marine opisthobranch gastropod mollusks in the family Aglajidae.

The two rather long "tails" at the end of the animal are characteristic of the genus.

== Species ==
Species with the genus Chelidonura include:

- Chelidonura alisonae Gosliner, 2011
- Chelidonura amoena Bergh, 1905
- Chelidonura castanea Yonow, 1994
- Chelidonura cubana Ortea & Martínez, 1997
- Chelidonura electra Rudman, 1970
- Chelidonura elegans Bergh, 1900
- Chelidonura flavolobata Heller & Thompson 1983
- Chelidonura hirundinina (Quoy & Gaimard, 1833)
- †Chelidonura jolkii (V. Anistratenko & Prisyazhnyuk, 1996)
- Chelidonura livida Yonow, 1994
- Chelidonura orchidaea Perrone, 1990
- Chelidonura pallida Risbec, 1951
- Chelidonura perparva (Risbec, 1928)
- †Chelidonura piserai Harzhauser, Landau & Malaquias, 2026
- Chelidonura plebeia Bergh, 1900
- Chelidonura punctata Eliot, 1903
- Chelidonura sanguinea J. K. Allan, 1933
- Chelidonura varians Eliot, 1903

Species brought into synonymy

- Chelidonura adamsi Angas, 1867: synonym of Chelidonura hirundinina (Quoy & Gaimard, 1833)
- Chelidonura africana Pruvot-Fol, 1953: synonym of Camachoaglaja africana (Pruvot-Fol, 1953)
- Chelidonura alexisi Gosliner, 2015: synonym of Mariaglaja alexisi (Gosliner, 2015)
- Chelidonura aureopunctata Rudman, 1968: synonym of Philinopsis gigliolii (Tapparone Canefri, 1874)
- Chelidonura babai Gosliner, 1988: synonym of Mariaglaja tsurugensis (Baba & Abe, 1959)
- Chelidonura berolina Er. Marcus & Ev. Marcus, 1970: synonym of Camachoaglaja berolina (Er. Marcus & Ev. Marcus, 1970)
- Chelidonura conformata Burn, 1966: synonym of Biuve fulvipunctata (Baba, 1938)
- Chelidonura evelinae Er. Marcus, 1955: synonym of Navanax gemmatus (Mörch, 1863)
- Chelidonura fulvipunctata Baba, 1938: synonym of Biuve fulvipunctata (Baba, 1938)
- Chelidonura inornata Baba, 1949: synonym of Mariaglaja inornata (Baba, 1949)
- Chelidonura italica Sordi, 1980: synonym of Camachoaglaja africana (Pruvot-Fol, 1953)
- Chelidonura juancarlosi Ortea & Espinosa, 1998: synonym of Camachoaglaja juancarlosi (Ortea & Espinosa, 1998)
- Chelidonura larramendii Ortea, Espinosa & Moro, 2009: synonym of Camachoaglaja larramendii (Ortea, Espinosa & Moro, 2009)
- Chelidonura leopoldoi Ortea, Moro & Espinosa, 1997: synonym of Camachoaglaja africana (Pruvot-Fol, 1953)
- Chelidonura mandroroa Gosliner, 2011: synonym of Mariaglaja mandroroa (Gosliner, 2011)
- Chelidonura mariagordae Ortea, Espinosa & Moro, 2004: synonym of Camachoaglaja mariagordae (Ortea, Espinosa & Moro, 2004)
- Chelidonura mediterranea Swennen, 1961: synonym of Biuve fulvipunctata (Baba, 1938)
- Chelidonura normani Ornelas-Gatdula, Dupont & Valdés, 2011: synonym of Camachoaglaja mariagordae (Ortea, Espinosa & Moro, 2004)
- Chelidonura nyanyana Edmunds, 1968: synonym of Navanax orbignyanus (Rochebrune, 1881)
- Chelidonura petra Ev. Marcus, 1976: synonym of Spinoaglaja petra (Ev. Marcus, 1976)
- Chelidonura philinopsis Eliot, 1903: synonym of Chelidonura hirundinina (Quoy & Gaimard, 1833)
- Chelidonura phocae Er. Marcus, 1961: synonym of Aglaja ocelligera (Bergh, 1894)
- Chelidonura polyalphos Gosliner & G. C. Williams, 1972: synonym of Navanax polyalphos (Gosliner & G. C. Williams, 1972)
- Chelidonura pusilla Ortea, Moro & Espinosa, 2014: Camachoaglaja pusilla (Ortea, Moro & Espinosa, 2014)
- Chelidonura quadrata Ortea, Caballer & Espinosa, 2014: synonym of Camachoaglaja quadrata (Ortea, Caballer & Espinosa, 2014)
- †Chelidonura radwanskii Bałuk, 2018: synonym of †Melanochlamys radwanskii (Bałuk, 2018)
- Chelidonura sabadiega Ortea, Moro & Espinosa, 1997: synonym of Mannesia sabadiega (Ortea, Moro & Espinosa, 1997)
- Chelidonura sabina Er. Marcus & Ev. Marcus, 1970: synonym of Camachoaglaja sabina (Er. Marcus & Ev. Marcus, 1970)
- Chelidonura tsurugensis Baba & Abe, 1959: synonym of Mariaglaja tsurugensis (Baba & Abe, 1959)
- Chelidonura velutina Bergh, 1905: synonym of Chelidonura varians Eliot, 1903
