= Aglaja tricolorata =

Scientific classification
- Domain: Eukaryota
- Kingdom: Animalia
- Phylum: Mollusca
- Class: Gastropoda
- Order: Cephalaspidea
- Family: Aglajidae
- Genus: Aglaja
- Species: A. tricolorata

Binomial name
- Aglaja tricolorata Renier, 1807

Synonyms
- Acera marmorata Cantraine, 1841; Aglaja taila Marcus Ev. & Er., 1966; Doridium meckelii Delle Chiaje, 1824; Doridium membranaceum Meckel, 1809; Doridium tuberculatum delle Chiaje, 1841

Species of gastropod

Aglaja tricolorata is a species of sea slug, an opisthobranch gastropod mollusc in the family Aglajidae. It is native to the Mediterranean Sea and the tropical eastern Atlantic Ocean where it lives in shallow water on the sandy seabed.

== Description ==
Aglaja tricolorata is a cylindrical sea slug growing to a length of about 5 cm (2 in). At the front there is a cephalic shield with a point at either side. Two parapodia project from either side of the foot and fold up over the back, each ending at the rear with a horn-shaped projection which often curves backwards. The hind end of the mantle has two rounded lobes; the left one is extended into a long flagellum, about one fifth the length of the body; the right one conceals the bipinnate gill. The whole animal is a translucent dark or pale brown colour, scattered with round white spots. The cephalic shield and the posterior lobes are margined by a thin white line. The sole of the foot is often darker than the upper parts, with white spots that are larger. A small internal shell, of one or two coils, is not visible externally. Aglaja tricolorata may be confused with the slightly larger Philinopsis depicta, but in that species, the parapodia are bordered by a double line, a blue line outside and an orange inside, and there is no long flagellum.

== Distribution and habitat ==
Aglaja tricolorata is native to the Mediterranean Sea and the coasts of tropical West Africa. It is a shallow water sea slug, found on muddy sand.

== Ecology ==
Like other members of its family, Aglaja tricolorata is a predator. Although its precise diet is unknown, it is thought to feed on other opisthobranches as some remnants have been found in the digestive tract. It has been observed "ploughing" through the sediment as if following a winding chemical trail left by its prey, perhaps detecting it by use of sensory hairs at the side of its mouth. Glands at the front of the foot lay down a carpet of mucus over which the animal glides. Other glands in the skin produce a toxic mucus which may discourage predators. Aglaja tricolorata is a hermaphrodite and the genital organs are on the right front of each individual. Having received sperm, the white eggs are laid in a thin string of mucus which the animal winds tightly round its body to form a tangled skein; it then emerges from the front of this cocoon, leaving the egg mass behind, possibly attaching it to the seabed.
