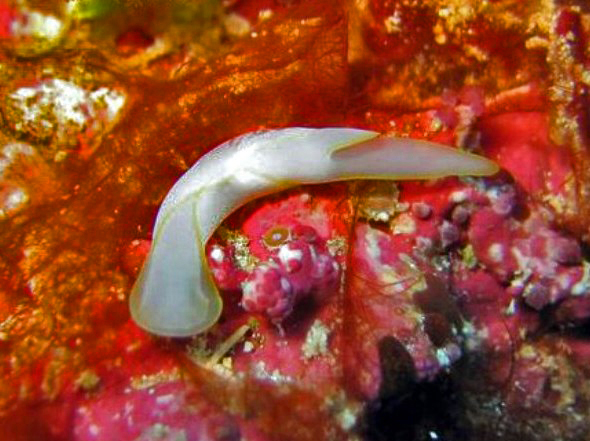
- A live individual of Chelidonura electra, in situ off Madagascar

Scientific classification
- Kingdom: Animalia
- Phylum: Mollusca
- Class: Gastropoda
- Order: Cephalaspidea
- Family: Aglajidae
- Genus: Chelidonura
- Species: C. electra

Binomial name
- Chelidonura electra Rudman, 1970

= Chelidonura electra =

Species of gastropod

Chelidonura electra is a species of sea slug, a "headshield slug", a marine opisthobranch gastropod mollusk in the family Aglajidae. The species name comes from the daughter of Agamemnon, Electra, and the Greek goddess of the same name, meaning "shining", with reference to the brilliance of this slug.

== Description ==
Chelidonura electra can reach a length of about 6–11 cm. The body is white with bright yellow margins and a large fleshy tail.

== Distribution ==
This headshield slug lives in the tropical Indo-West Pacific, from Madagascar to Indonesia and East Australia.

== Habitat ==
This species can be found on shallow sand flats, associated with Porites species of coral.
