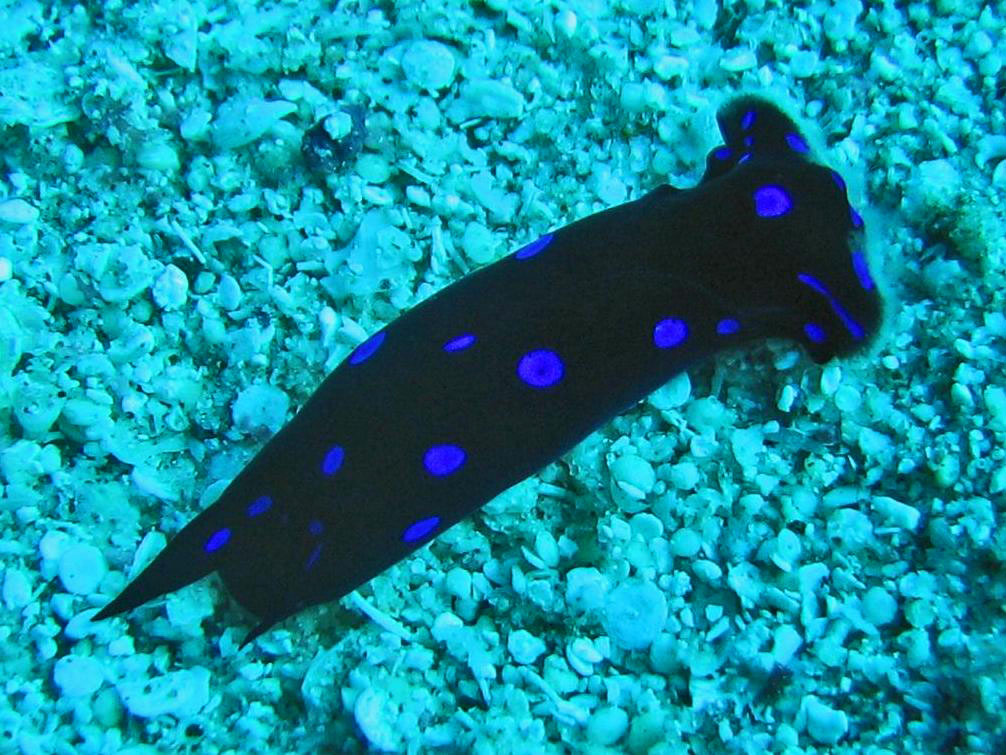
- A live individual of Chelidonura livida, in situ off Sharm el Sheik, Egypt

Scientific classification
- Kingdom: Animalia
- Phylum: Mollusca
- Class: Gastropoda
- Order: Cephalaspidea
- Family: Aglajidae
- Genus: Chelidonura
- Species: C. livida

Binomial name
- Chelidonura livida Yonow, 1994

= Chelidonura livida =

Species of gastropod

Chelidonura livida is a species of sea slug, or "headshield slug", a marine opisthobranch gastropod mollusk in the family Aglajidae.

== Description ==
Chelidonura livida can reach a length of about 10–50 mm. The body is black or dark brown, with bright blue spots or rings.

== Distribution ==
This headshield slug lives in the Red Sea, Madagascar and in the tropical western Indian Ocean up to northern Australia and Philippines.

== Habitat ==
It is a sand dwelling species that can be found on intertidal shallow sand flats.
