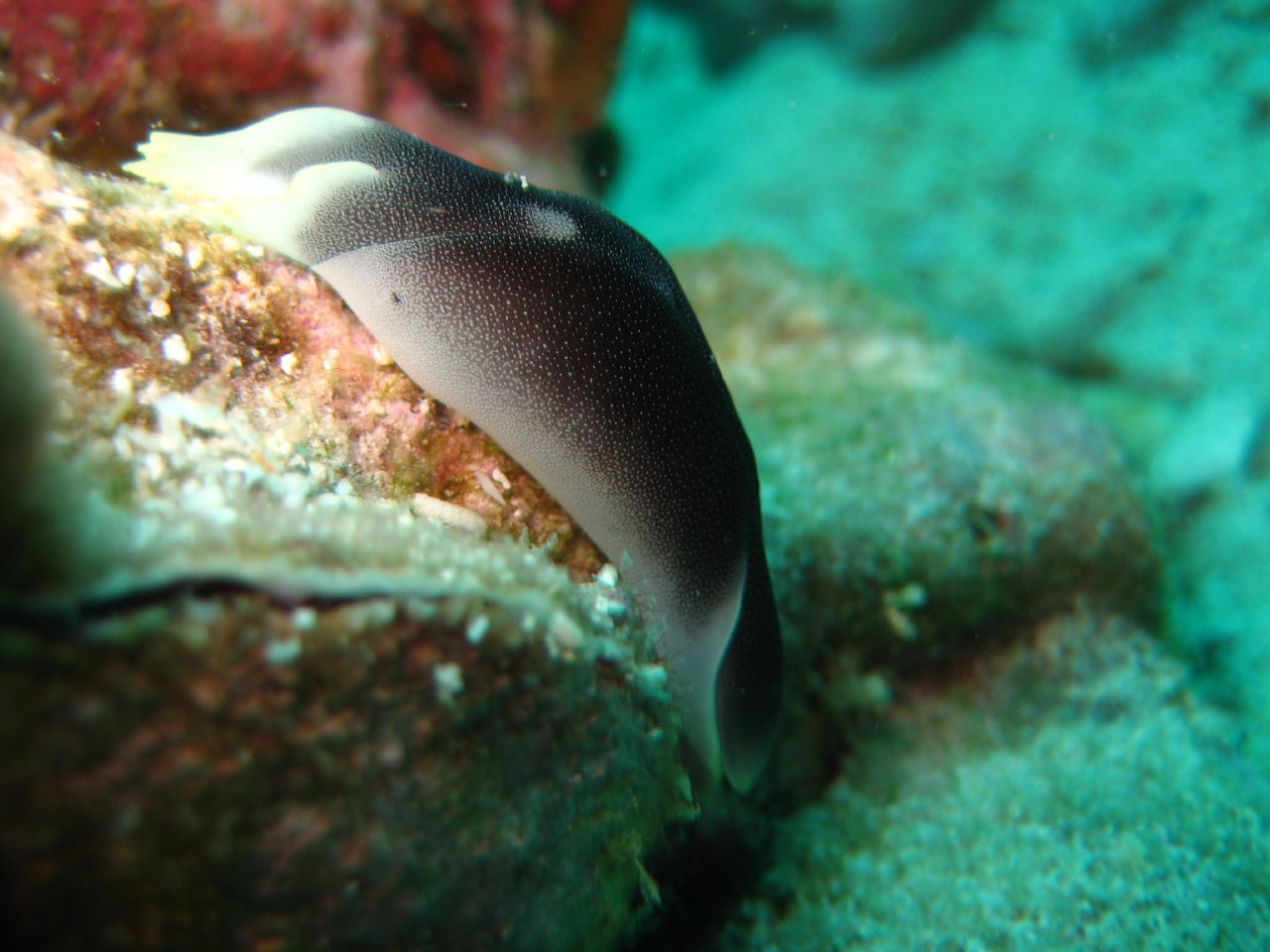
- Chelidonura amoena

Scientific classification
- Kingdom: Animalia
- Phylum: Mollusca
- Class: Gastropoda
- Order: Cephalaspidea
- Family: Aglajidae
- Genus: Chelidonura
- Species: C. amoena

Binomial name
- Chelidonura amoena Bergh, 1905

= Chelidonura amoena =

Species of gastropod

Chelidonura amoena is a species of sea slug, or "headshield slug", a marine opisthobranch gastropod mollusk in the family Aglajidae.

== Distribution ==
Chelidonura amoena is widespread throughout the tropical waters of the central area of Indo-Pacific region.
