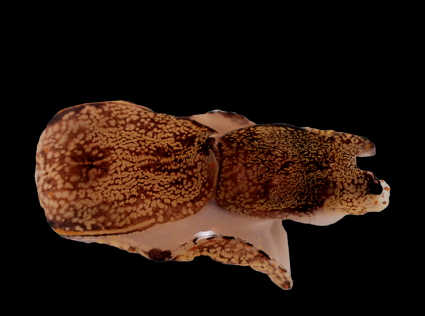

Scientific classification
- Kingdom: Animalia
- Phylum: Mollusca
- Class: Gastropoda
- Order: Cephalaspidea
- Family: Aglajidae
- Genus: Philinopsis
- Species: P. capensis

Binomial name
- Philinopsis capensis Pease, 1860

Synonyms
- Doridium capense Bergh, 1907 superseded combination

= Philinopsis capensis =

Species of gastropod

Philinopsis capensis, the slipper slug, is a species of sea slug, a shell-less opisthobranch gastropod mollusc in the family Aglajidae.

== Description ==
The length of the species is at least 40 mm.

(Original description) The species measures 5 cm in length from head to the tips of the posterior wings, with a breadth (including raised foot-lobes) of 1.8 cm and a height of 1.9 cm. The anterior shield is 2.2 cm long, with its posterior edge projecting freely by 6 mm. The wings of the posterior shield are 10 mm long. The foot is 13 mm wide, with wings extending 8 mm high, and the tail measures 8 mm in length.

The animal is nearly uniformly grayish-white, though it was likely darker when alive. The underside of the anterior shield, the neck beneath it, and the body sides are blackish. The inner margins of the foot-lobes on the posterior wings are also blackish, though fainter on the outer side. The large gill is white, while the foot is grayish with a black anterior end. The overall form is typical, with a somewhat elongated anterior shield and wing-like lobes on the posterior shield, which project downward with the tips turned slightly inward. The right wing appears slightly larger than the left, and no flagellum is present. The upper side of the animal is entirely smooth. The large gill projects almost completely out of the gill cavity, measuring 8 mm wide by 6 mm high and composed of 10 large tufts of lamellae, with its end slightly rolled.

The shell is membranous with a faint yellowish tint, and only the small nuclear portion shows slight calcification. The main whorl does not appear to extend toward the base of the right wing. The shell measures 13 mm in length by 7 mm in width.

The mouth tube is 6 mm long and black on both the outside and inside. The "bulbus pharyngeus" measures 14 mm in length, with a height of 9 mm and a width of 8 mm. It is yellowish-white both internally and externally, with the usual rounded prismatic form and structure, and walls of the arrow-shaped cavity are 0.25–0.3 mm thick. The liver is yellowish gray. The penis is yellowish and black in front.

== Distinguishing features ==
The body has a mottled brown-black and cream appearance, covered with white or yellow spots. The posterior end features two tails of equal length. The body is composed of three joined segments.

The species is mottled brown-black on the exterior, with a cream or opaque color on the interior.

== Distribution ==
This marine species is endemic to South Africa and occurs off False Bay to East London.
