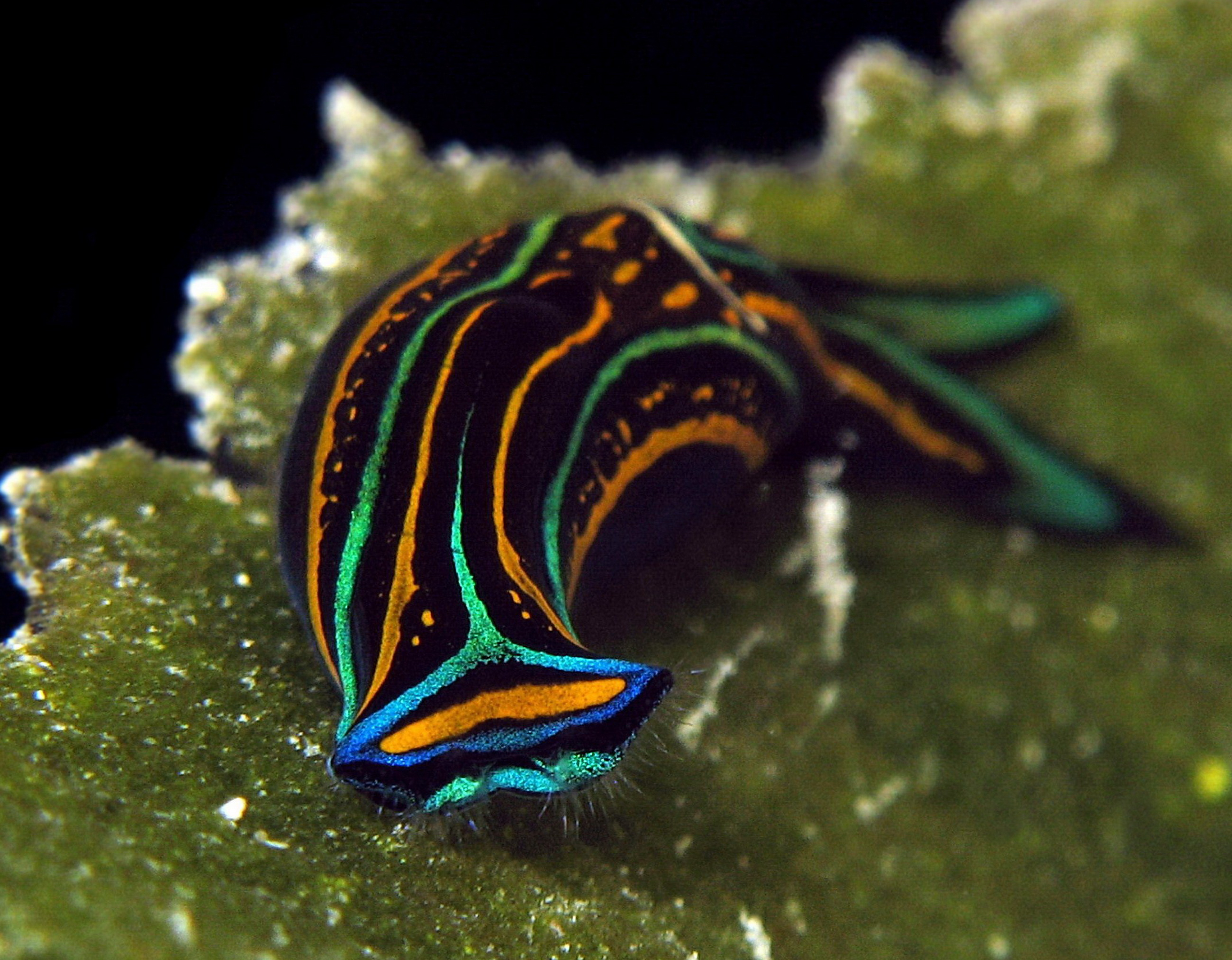
- Chelinodura hirundinina

Scientific classification
- Kingdom: Animalia
- Phylum: Mollusca
- Class: Gastropoda
- Order: Cephalaspidea
- Family: Aglajidae
- Genus: Chelidonura
- Species: C. hirundinina

Binomial name
- Chelidonura hirundinina (Quoy & Gaimard, 1833)

Synonyms
- Bulla hirundinina Quoy & Gaimard, 1833 (basionym); Chelidonura philinopsis Eliot, 1903; Chelidonura adamsi G.F. Angas, 1867; Chelidonura elegans L.S.R. Bergh, 1900

= Chelidonura hirundinina =

Species of gastropod

Chelidonura hirundinina is a species of small and colorful aglajid sea slug, a shell-less opisthobranch gastropod mollusk in the family Aglajidae.

The former variety Chelidonura hirundinina var. punctata was elevated to the species Chelidonura punctata.

Despite its colorful appearance, this is not a species of nudibranch; it is a cephalaspidean, a headshield slug. This is a tropical species which lives in the western Indo-Pacific, and also in the Caribbean Sea.

== Description ==
This species has a maximum size of 40 mm (1.6 in), but is often smaller than that. The background color can be red, orange, dark brown, or black. There are blue, black, and orange stripes on the body, and there is a white marking towards the posterior end of the animal.

The two rather long "tails" at the end of the animal are characteristic of the genus Chelidonura. They have also well-developed sensory cilia on the anterior edge of the head which are used to find the prey.

The specific epithet hirundinina is Latin, meaning "little swallow", in reference to this swallow-tailed appearance.

== Life habits ==
This species eats flatworms and has a diurnal activity.

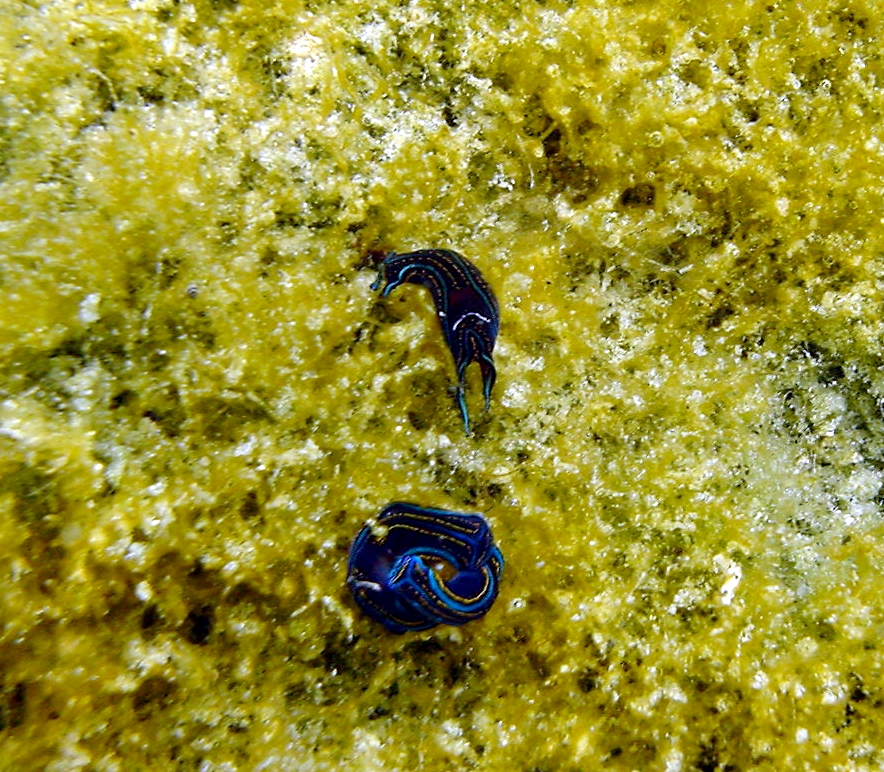
Mating sea slugs

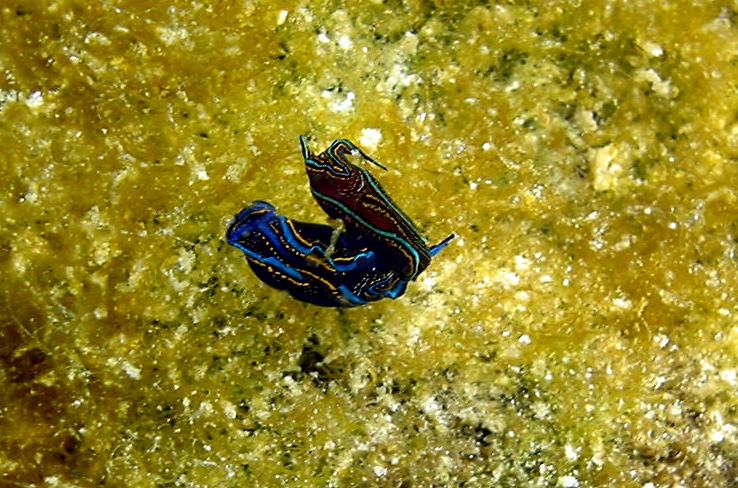
A pair of mating Chelidonura hirundinina in Kona, Hawaii

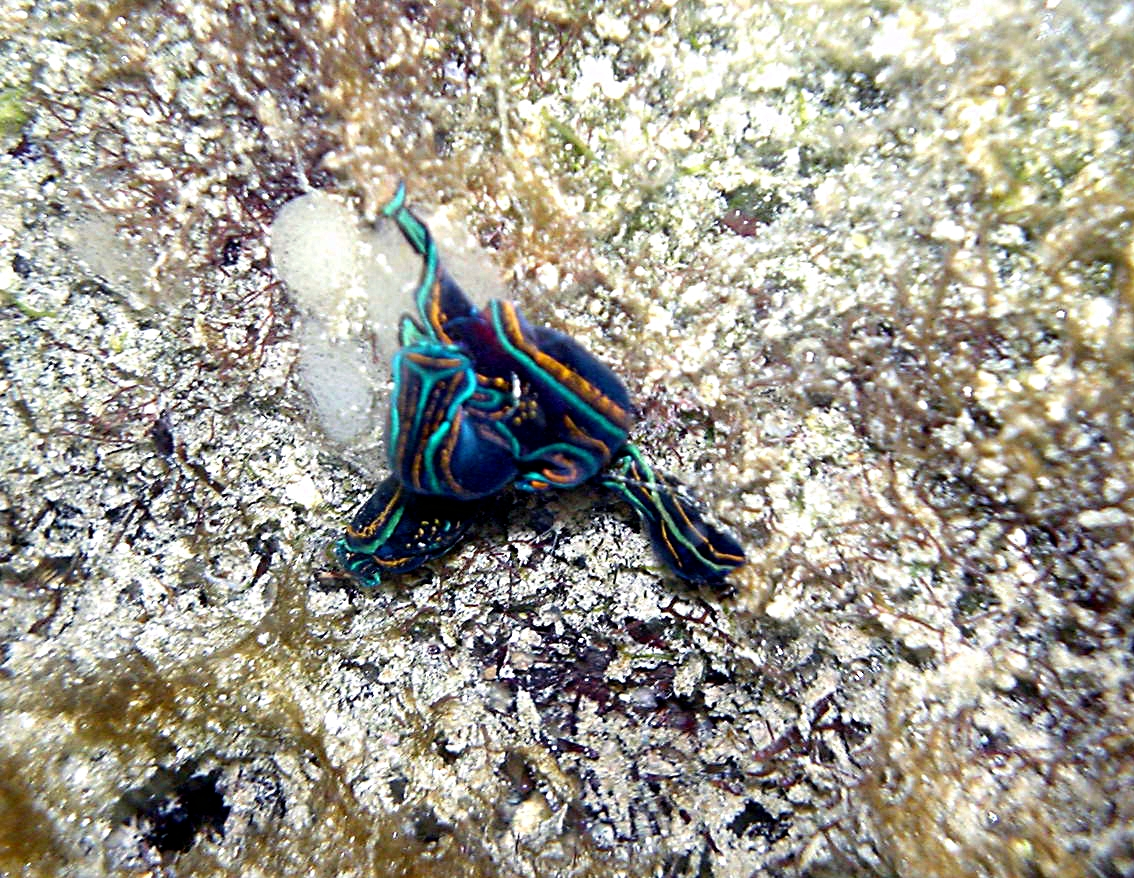
A ball of mating Chelidonura hirundinina, Kona, Hawaii
