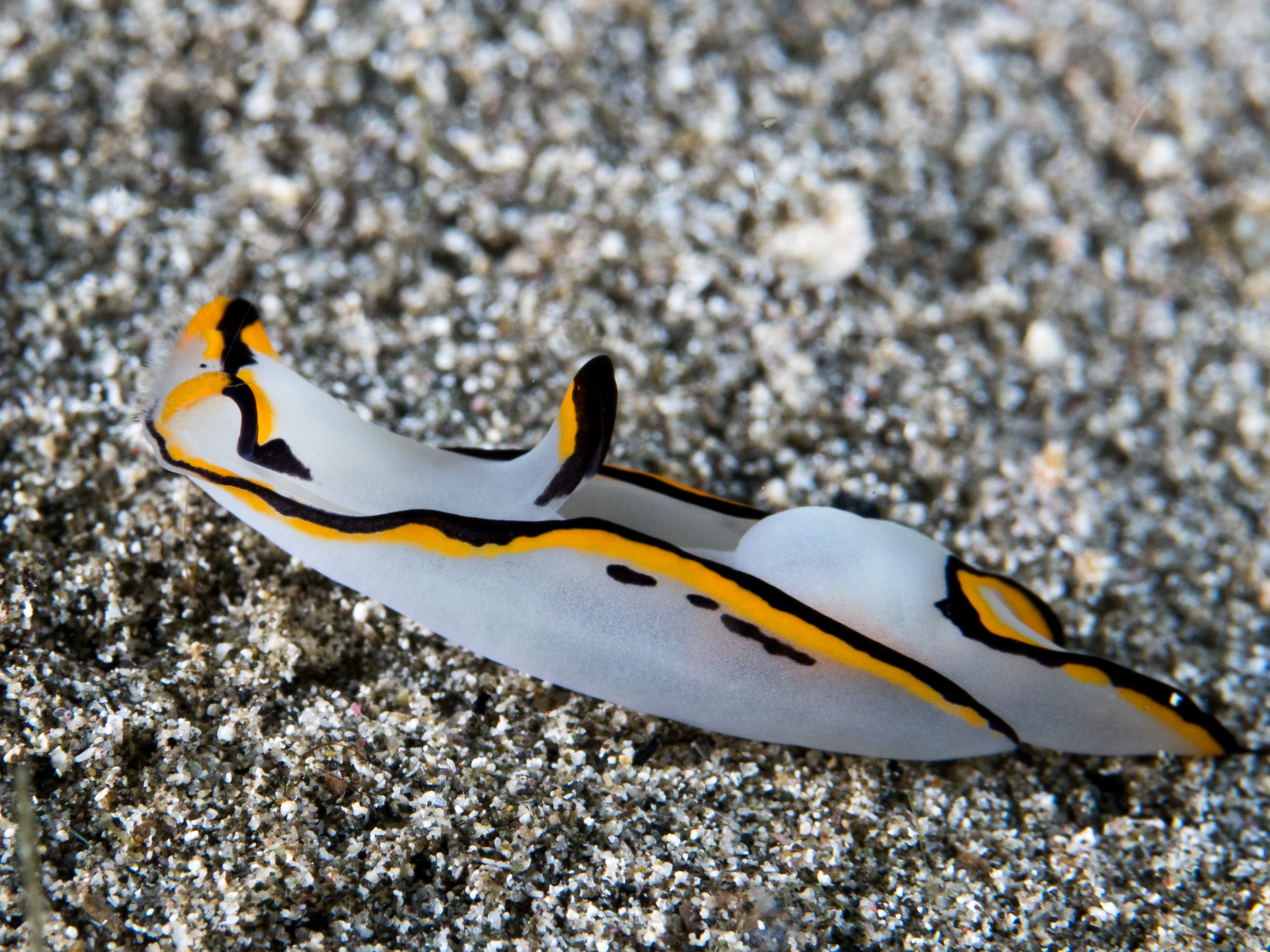
- Chelidonura pallida

Scientific classification
- Kingdom: Animalia
- Phylum: Mollusca
- Class: Gastropoda
- Order: Cephalaspidea
- Family: Aglajidae
- Genus: Chelidonura
- Species: C. pallida

Binomial name
- Chelidonura pallida Risbec, 1951

= Chelidonura pallida =

Species of gastropod

Chelidonura pallida is a species of sea slug, or "headshield slug", a marine opisthobranch gastropod mollusk in the family Aglajidae.

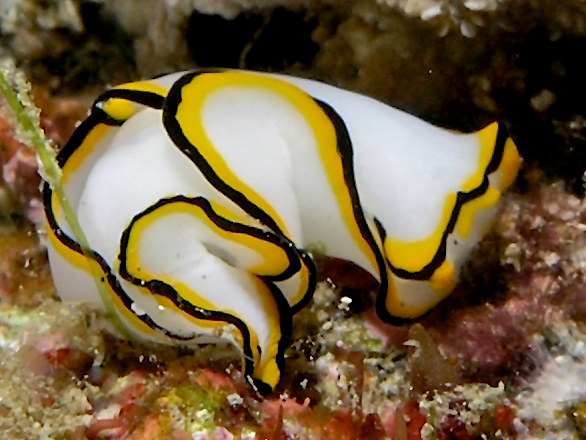
Chelidonura pallida
