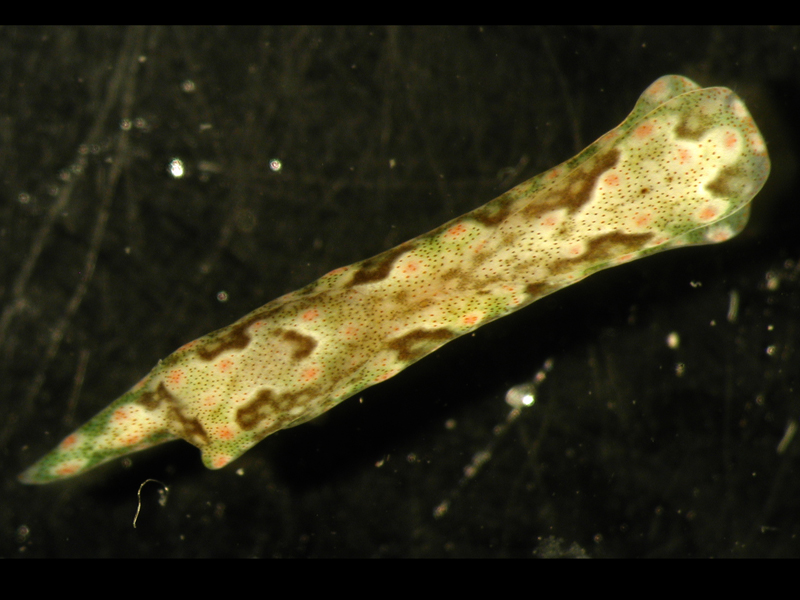
- Odontoglaja guamensis

Scientific classification
- Kingdom: Animalia
- Phylum: Mollusca
- Class: Gastropoda
- Order: Cephalaspidea
- Family: Aglajidae
- Genus: Odontoglaja; Rudman, 1978

Type species
- Odontoglaja guamensis Rudman, 1978

Species
- See text

= Odontoglaja =

Genus of gastropods

Odontoglaja is a genus of sea slugs, marine opisthobranch gastropod molluscs in the family Aglajidae.

== Species ==
Species in the genus Odontoglaja include :

- Odontoglaja guamensis Rudman, 1978
- Odontoglaja mosaica Gosliner, 2011

Synonym

- Odontoglaja sabadiega (Ortea, Moro & Espinosa, 1997): synonym of Mannesia sabadiega (Ortea, Moro & Espinosa, 1996)
