= Camachoaglaja mariagordae =

Scientific classification
- Kingdom: Animalia
- Phylum: Mollusca
- Class: Gastropoda
- Order: Cephalaspidea
- Family: Aglajidae
- Genus: Camachoaglaja
- Species: C. mariagordae

Binomial name
- Camachoaglaja mariagordae (Ortea, Espinosa & Moro, 2004)

Synonyms
- Chelidonura mariagordae Ortea, Espinosa & Moro, 2004; Chelidonura normani Ornelas-Gatdula, Dupont & Valdés, 2011

Species of gastropod

Camachoaglaja mariagordae is a species of sea slug or headshield slug, a marine opisthobranch gastropod mollusc in the family Aglajidae.

It is chiefly found in the Bahamas.
