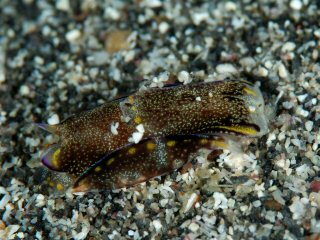
- A live individual of Philinopsis speciosa in situ

Scientific classification
- Kingdom: Animalia
- Phylum: Mollusca
- Class: Gastropoda
- Order: Cephalaspidea
- Family: Aglajidae
- Genus: Philinopsis; Pease, 1860

Synonyms
- Acera Lamarck, 1822; Eidothea Risso, 1826 (nomen oblitum)

= Philinopsis =

Genus of gastropods

Philiopsis is a genus of often colorful, medium-sized sea slugs, marine opisthobranch gastropod mollusks. These are not nudibranchs; instead they are headshield slugs, in the clade Cephalaspidea.

== Description ==
(Original description) Animal: The head disk is large, oblong-oval to triangular in shape, and does not extend beyond the foot. Behind the head disk, the body forms a convex, fleshy lobe that begins beneath the overlapping head disk and extends to or just past the posterior portion of the foot. This lobe is truncated at the rear, with the truncation bordered by an undulated or crenated crest. Eyes are not visible. The mouth is proboscidiform, positioned between the cephalic disk and foot, and may have a pair of tentacles on either side. The foot is large, rounded, and reflected at the sides. A branchial plume is located near the posterior end of the body, curving around near the truncated end of the foot. The shell is concealed within this truncated end.

== Species ==
Recognized species within the genus Philinopsis are:

- Philinopsis aliciae Gosliner, 2015
- Philinopsis bagaensis Ortea, Moro & Espinosa, 2007
- Philinopsis batabanoensis Ortea, Moro & Espinosa, 2007
- Philinopsis buntot Gosliner, 2015
- Philinopsis capensis (Bergh, 1907)
- Philinopsis ctenophoraphaga Gosliner, 2011
- Philinopsis depicta (Renier, 1807)
- Philinopsis dubia (O'Donoghue, 1929)
- Philinopsis gigliolii (Tapparone Canefri, 1874)
- Philinopsis minor (Tchang-Si, 1934)
- Philinopsis nuttalli (Pilsbry, 1895)
- Philinopsis pusa (Ev. Marcus & Er. Marcus, 1966)
- Philinopsis quinza (Ev. Marcus, 1979)
- Philinopsis speciosa Pease, 1860
- Philinopsis troubridgensis (Verco, 1909)
- Philinopsis virgo (Rudman, 1968)

== Synonyms ==
- Philinopsis aeci Ortea & Espinosa, 2001: synonym of Spinoaglaja aeci (Ortea & Espinosa, 2001) (original combination)
- Philinopsis anneae Ornelas-Gatdula & Á. Valdés, 2012: synonym of Spinoaglaja petra (Ev. Marcus, 1976)
- Philinopsis coronata Gosliner, 2011: synonym of Spinophallus coronatus (Gosliner, 2011) (original combination)
- Philinopsis cyanea (E. von Martens, 1879): synonym of Philinopsis speciosa Pease, 1860
- Philinopsis falciphallus Gosliner, 2011: synonym of Spinophallus falciphallus (Gosliner, 2011)
- Philinopsis gardineri (Eliot, 1903): synonym of Tubulophilinopsis gardineri (Eliot, 1903)
- Philinopsis lineolata (H. Adams & A. Adams, 1854): synonym of Tubulophilinopsis lineolata (H. Adams & A. Adams, 1854) (superseded combination)
- Philinopsis miqueli Pelorce, Horst & Hoarau, 2013: synonym of Melanochlamys miqueli (Pelorce, Horst & Hoarau, 2013) (original combination)
- Philinopsis nigra Pease, 1860: synonym of Philinopsis pilsbryi (Eliot, 1900): synonym of Tubulophilinopsis pilsbryi (Eliot, 1900) (potentially nomen oblitum)
- Philinopsis orientalis (Baba, 1949): synonym of Spinoaglaja orientalis (Baba, 1949)
- Philinopsis petra (Ev. Marcus, 1976): synonym of Spinoaglaja petra (Ev. Marcus, 1976)
- Philinopsis pilsbryi (Eliot, 1900): synonym of Tubulophilinopsis pilsbryi (Eliot, 1900)
- Philinopsis reticulata (Eliot, 1903): synonym of Tubulophilinopsis reticulata (Eliot, 1903)
- Philinopsis taronga (J. K. Allan, 1933): synonym of Philinopsis gigliolii (Tapparone Canefri, 1874) (junior subjective synonym)
