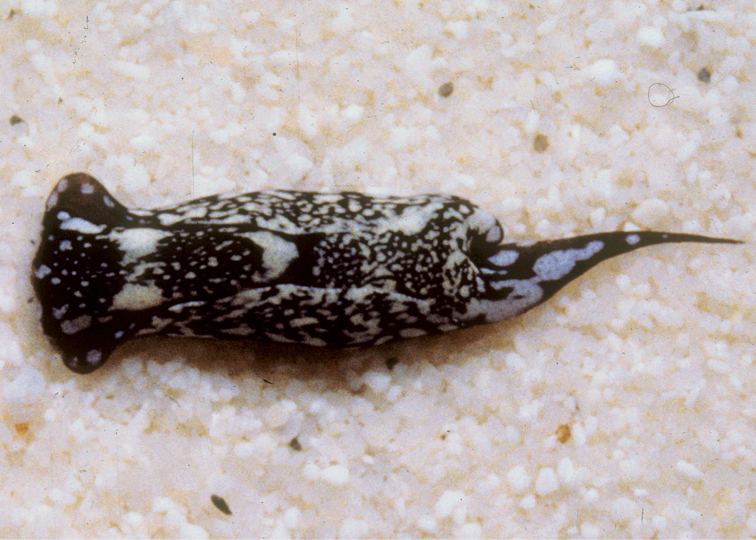
- Mariaglaja tsurugensis

Scientific classification
- Kingdom: Animalia
- Phylum: Mollusca
- Class: Gastropoda
- Order: Cephalaspidea
- Family: Aglajidae
- Genus: Mariaglaja; Zamora-Silva & Malaquias, 2017

= Mariaglaja =

Genus of gastropod

Mariaglaja is a genus of sea slug, or "headshield slug", a marine opisthobranch gastropod mollusk in the family Aglajidae.

== Species ==
Species currently within the genus Mariaglaja include:

- Mariaglaja alexisi (Gosliner, 2015)
- Mariaglaja inornata (Baba, 1949)
- Mariaglaja mandroroa (Gosliner, 2011)
- Mariaglaja tsurugensis (Baba & Abe, 1959)

Synonyms include:

- Mariaglaja sandrana (Rudman, 1973): synonym of Mariaglaja tsurugensis (Baba & Abe, 1959)

== Gallery ==
M. inornata

M. mandroroa

M. tsurugensis
