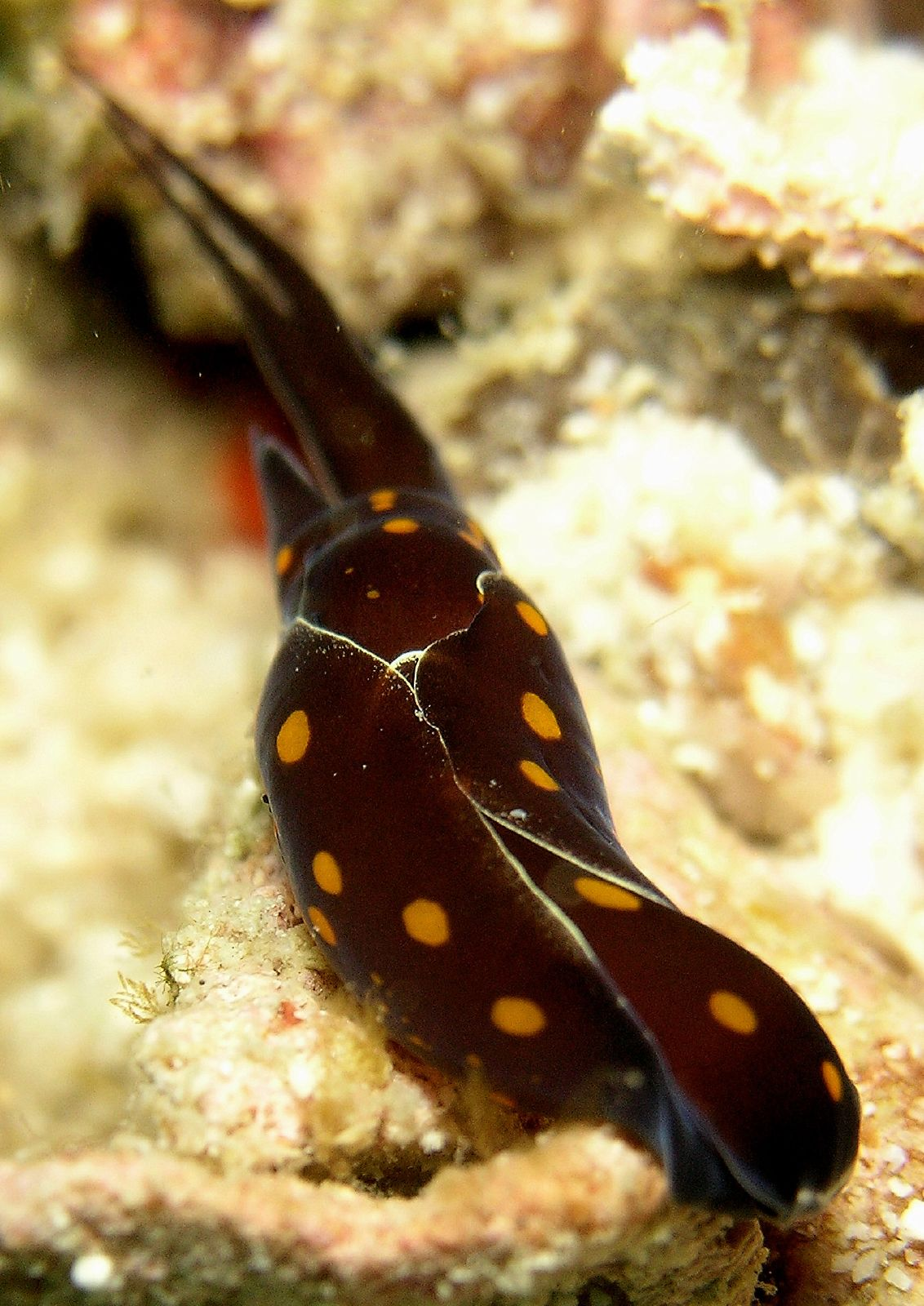

Scientific classification
- Kingdom: Animalia
- Phylum: Mollusca
- Class: Gastropoda
- Order: Cephalaspidea
- Family: Aglajidae
- Genus: Chelidonura
- Species: C. punctata

Binomial name
- Chelidonura punctata Eliot, 1903

Synonyms
- Chelidonura hirundinina var. punctata Eliot, 1903 (basionym)

= Chelidonura punctata =

Species of gastropod

Chelidonura punctata is a species of sea slug, or "headshield slug", a marine opisthobranch gastropod mollusk in the family Aglajidae.

== Distribution ==
Chelidonura punctata was described from Zanzibar as Chelidonura hirundinina var. punctata. It is widespread through the tropical waters of the Indian Ocean.

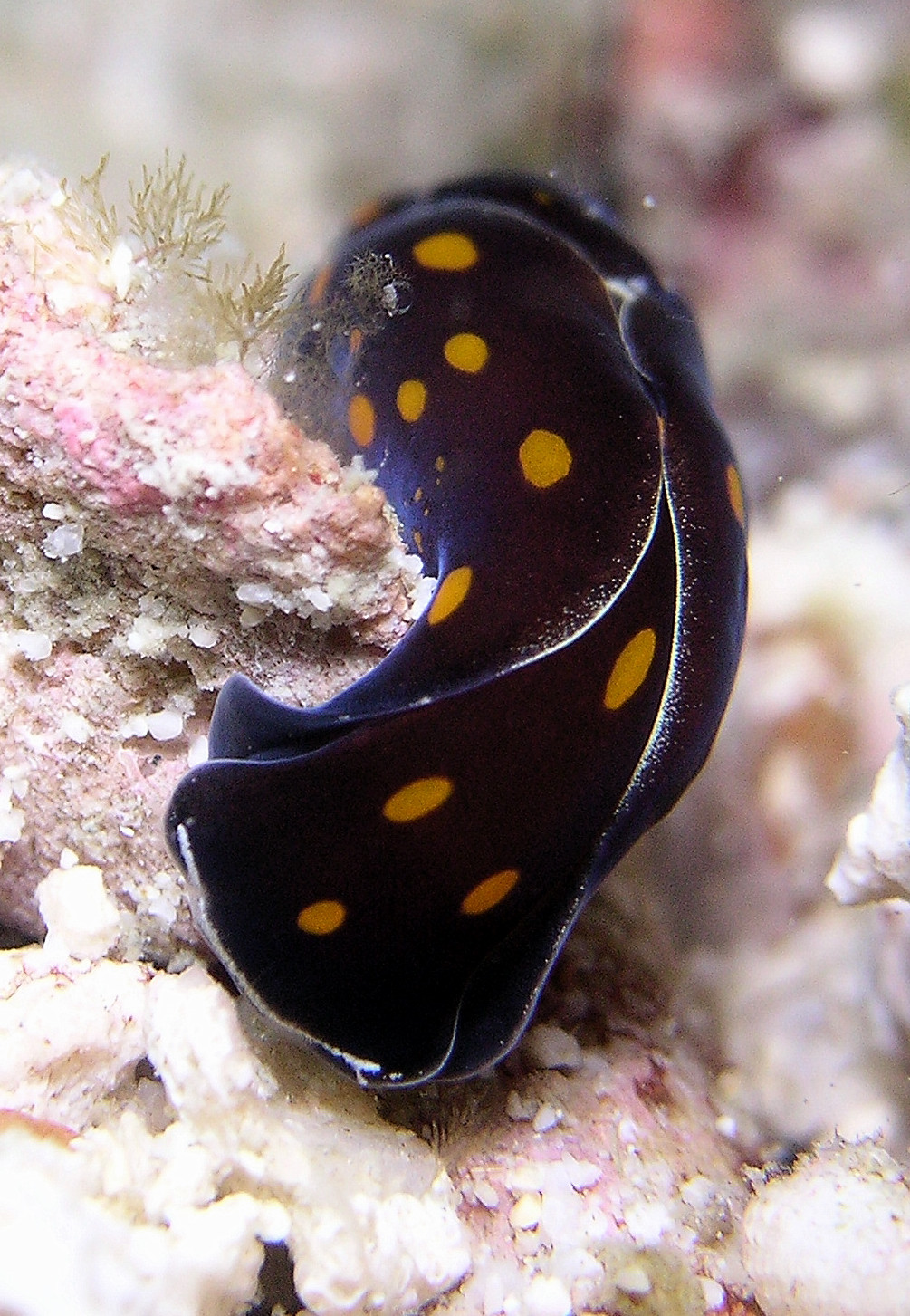
Chelidonura punctata

== Description ==
This species has a maximum size of 30 mm. The background color is dark brown or black and the body is covered with large orange or yellow spots. The margin of the parapods are marked with a thin white line. The two rather long "tails" at the end of the animal are characteristic of the genus Chelidonura, the left one is always longer. Chelidonura always have well-developed sensory cilia on the anterior edge of the head which are used to find the prey.

== Ecology ==
Chelidonura punctata feeds on acoel flatworms. This headshield slug lives on coral reefs in shallow water.
