= Camachoaglaja =

- Camachoaglaja binter

Scientific classification
- Kingdom: Animalia
- Phylum: Mollusca
- Class: Gastropoda
- Order: Cephalaspidea
- Family: Aglajidae
- Genus: Camachoaglaja; Zamora-Silva & Malaquias, 2017

Genus of gastropod

Camachoaglaja is a genus of sea slug or headshield slug, a marine opisthobranch gastropod mollusc in the family Aglajidae.

== Species ==
Species within the genus Camachoaglaja include:

- Camachoaglaja africana (Pruvot-Fol, 1953)
- Camachoaglaja berolina (Er. Marcus & Ev. Marcus, 1970)
- Camachoaglaja binter Ortea & Moro, 2018
- Camachoaglaja juancarlosi (Ortea & Espinosa, 1998)
- Camachoaglaja larramendii (Ortea, Espinosa & Moro, 2009)
- Camachoaglaja mariagordae (Ortea, Espinosa & Moro, 2004)
- Camachoaglaja pusilla (Ortea, Moro & Espinosa, 2014)
- Camachoaglaja quadrata (Ortea, Caballer & Espinosa, 2014)
- Camachoaglaja sabina (Er. Marcus & Ev. Marcus, 1970)
