= Philinopsis depicta =

Scientific classification
- Kingdom: Animalia
- Phylum: Mollusca
- Class: Gastropoda
- Order: Cephalaspidea
- Family: Aglajidae
- Genus: Philinopsis
- Species: P. depicta

Binomial name
- Philinopsis depicta (Renier, 1807)

Synonyms
- Acera carnosa (Cuvier, 1810); Aglaja depicta Renier, 1807; Aglaja pelsunca Ev. Marcus & Er. Marcus, 1966; Bulla carnosa Cuvier, 1810; Doridium aplysiforme Delle Chiaje, 1825; Doridium carnosum (Cuvier, 1810); Doridium coriaceum Meckel, 1809; Doridium depictum (Renier, 1807); Eidothea marmorata Risso, 1826; Melanochlamys depicta (Renier, 1807)

Species of gastropod

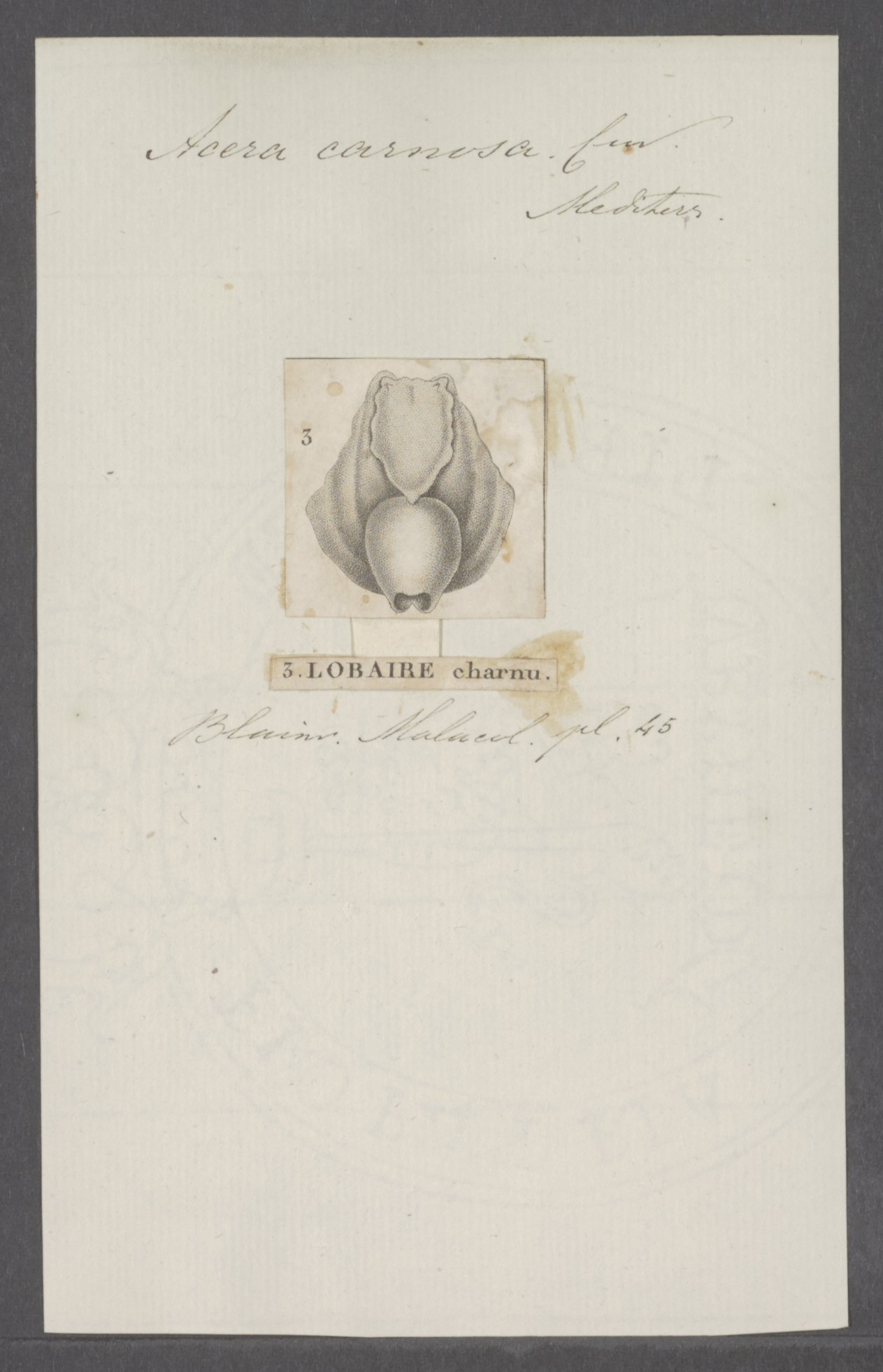
Acera carnosa, Print, Iconographia Zoologica, Special Collections University of Amsterdam.

Philinopsis depicta is a species of sea slug, an opisthobranch gastropod mollusc in the family Aglajidae. It is native to the Mediterranean Sea where it lives on the sandy seabed in shallow water. It is a predator.

== Description ==
Philinopsis depicta is a large sea slug that can reach a length of 10 cm (4 in). The head is protected by a large cephalic shield which extends as far as the central body where it forms a noticeable pointed protrusion. A pair of parapodia extend from the foot and reach as high as the back. The small, flattened shell is obscured by the posterior shield which terminates with two small, sometimes raised, lobes. The colouring is somewhat variable, either pale brown with white specks, or a deeper brown or blackish shade, often flecked with small white specks which coalesce to form small patches. Nearly all individuals have a continuous double line of colour, orange and blue, which edges the cephalic shield, the parapodia, the posterior shield and the tip of the mantle. Other species of sea slug with which it could be confused include Aglaja tricolorata and Melanochlamys wildpretii; the former is tan with more-regularly arranged white spots, no cephalic shield peak and no orange and blue lines round the body; the latter has a more uniform orange-brown colour, no cephalic shield peak, and a slender white line that outlines the parapodia and crosses the mid-back.

== Distribution and habitat ==
Philinopsis depicta is native to the Mediterranean Sea. Reports of it occurring in the Caribbean Sea may be referring to a similar but different species. It is a shallow water sea slug, found on muddy sand.

== Ecology ==
Sea slugs in the Aglajidae family are predators. The diet of Philinopsis depicta has not been precisely ascertained, but stomach contents have been shown to include Bulla striata and Haminoea species, it probably eats other sea slugs, and it has eaten Elysia timida in captivity. There are no jaws, grinding plates in the stomach, or radula, so it is thought the sea slug protrudes its foregut and sucks up its prey whole; shells or undigested fragments are ejected.

This sea slug is a hermaphrodite. The gonopore is located under the right parapodium at the rear of the body. Either individual in a pair may receive sperm from the other, or sperm donation may be reciprocal. An individual which has been inseminated lays eggs embedded in a transparent thread which is usually covered with sand. When the eggs hatch after a few days, the veliger larvae are planktonic for a while, before settling on the seabed and undergoing metamorphosis into juveniles.
