= Mariaglaja tsurugensis =

Scientific classification
- Kingdom: Animalia
- Phylum: Mollusca
- Class: Gastropoda
- Order: Cephalaspidea
- Family: Aglajidae
- Genus: Mariaglaja
- Species: M. tsurugensis

Binomial name
- Mariaglaja tsurugensis (Baba & Abe, 1959)

Synonyms
- Chelidonura babai Gosliner, 1988; Chelidonura sandrana Rudman, 1973; Chelidonura tsurugensis Baba & Abe, 1959; Mariaglaja sandrana (Rudman, 1973)

Species of gastropod

Mariaglaja tsurugensis is a species of sea slug, or "headshield slug", a marine opisthobranch gastropod mollusk in the family Aglajidae. This species lives from Tanzania to Australia.

== Ecology ==
Mariaglaja tsurugensis is a simultaneously hermaphroditic species. Contrary to classic theoretical predictions, Sprenger et al. (2011) have shown for the first time that the mating rate is largely unresponsive to variations in mate availability in this simultaneous hermaphrodite. With mating rates being close to the female fitness optimum, their findings challenge the prevailing notion of male-driven mating rates in simultaneous hermaphrodites, and call for complementary investigations of mating-rate effects on fitness through the male sexual function.

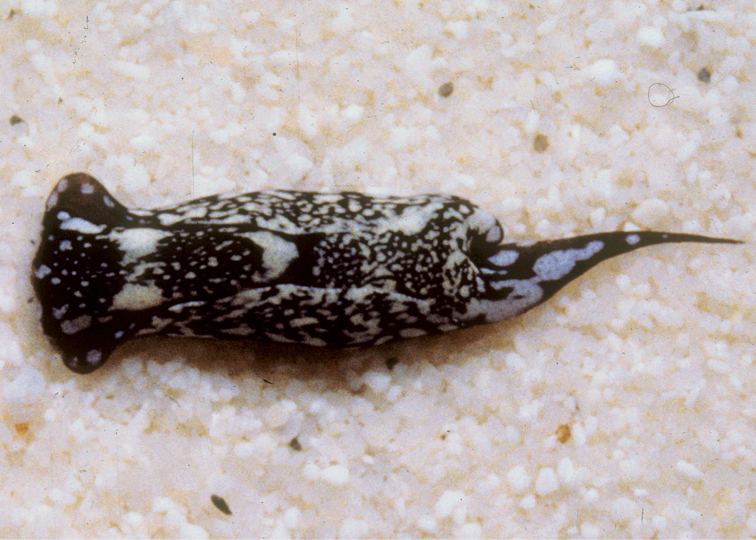
M. tsurugensis, the Maldives

M. tsurugensis, Australia
