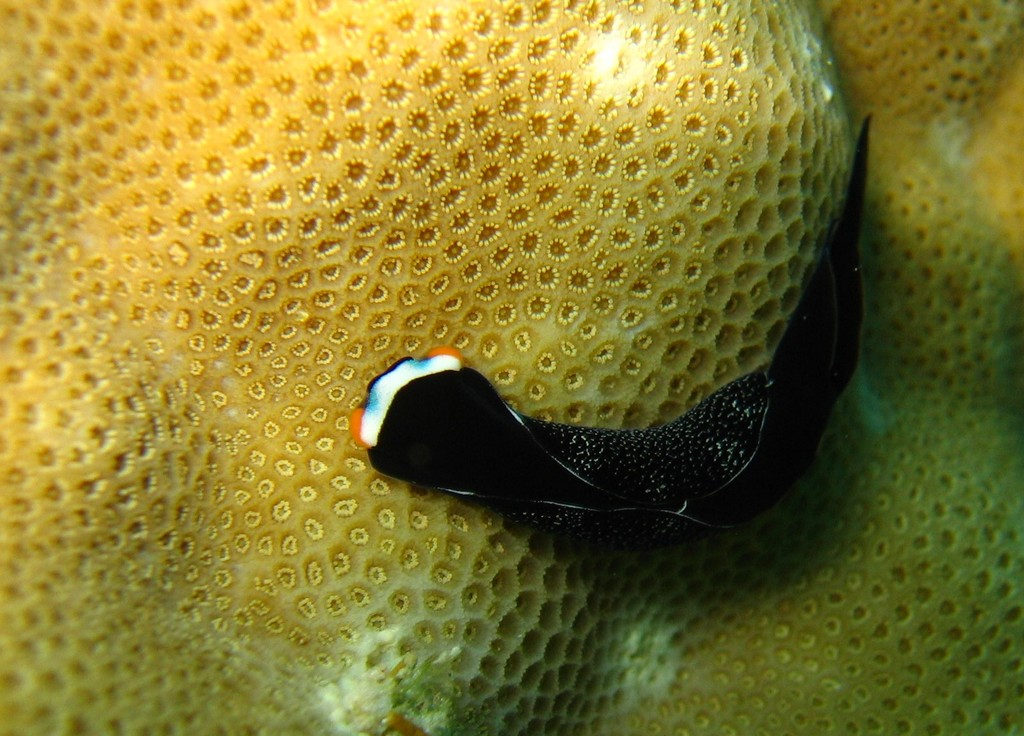
- Mariaglaja inornata on a coral

Scientific classification
- Kingdom: Animalia
- Phylum: Mollusca
- Class: Gastropoda
- Order: Cephalaspidea
- Family: Aglajidae
- Genus: Mariaglaja
- Species: M. inornata

Binomial name
- Mariaglaja inornata (Baba, 1949)

= Mariaglaja inornata =

Species of gastropod

Mariaglaja inornata, also called the inornate headshield slug, is a species of sea slug or headshield slug, a marine opisthobranch gastropod mollusc in the family Aglajidae.

== Description ==
The general body colour is a purplish black, with minute white dots densely scattered over the outer surface of the parapodia and on the sole of the foot. The parapodia are also edged in white, sometimes with a continuous white line but often with a broken line. There is usually a broad white band across the front of the head-shield, and there is a yellow or orange edge to the antero-lateral lobes. The eyes are situated on the inside edge of the lateral lobes, in a translucent area devoid of black pigment. The patch often appears blue.

== Classification ==
Originally described in the genus Chelidonura, this species is now placed in the genus Mariaglaja based on molecular phylogenetic results.

== Distribution ==
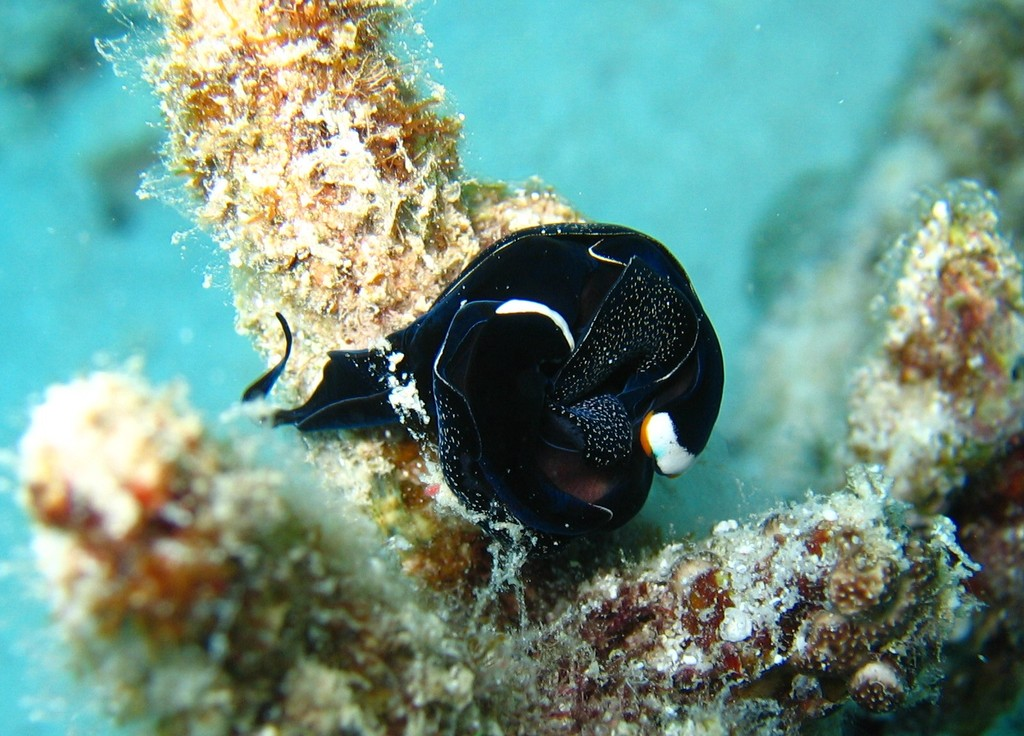
Mariaglaja inornata

Mariaglaja inornata is found in the tropical Western Pacific from Japan to eastern Australia.
