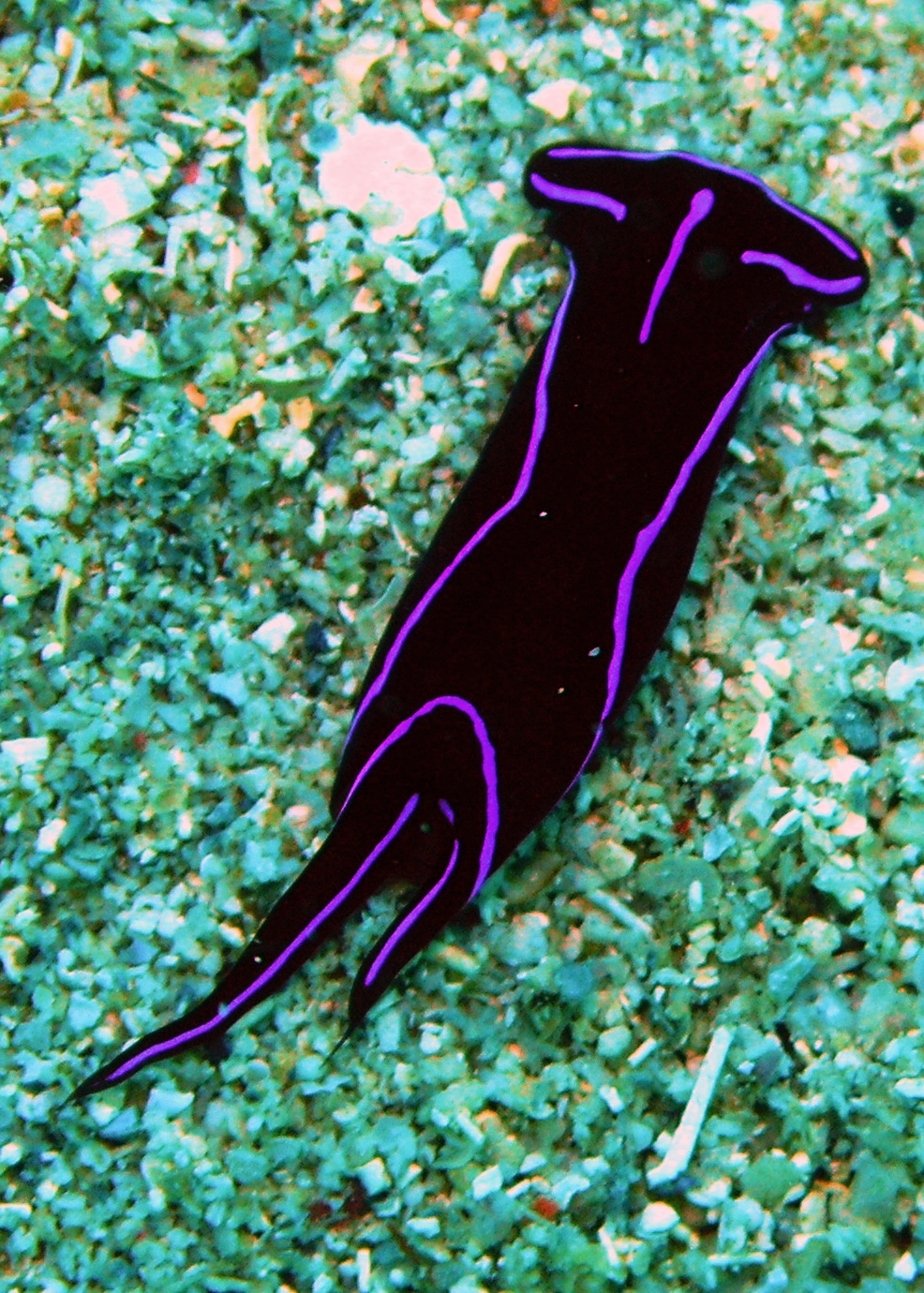

Scientific classification
- Kingdom: Animalia
- Phylum: Mollusca
- Class: Gastropoda
- Order: Cephalaspidea
- Family: Aglajidae
- Genus: Chelidonura
- Species: C. varians

Binomial name
- Chelidonura varians Eliot, 1903

= Chelidonura varians =

Species of gastropod

Chelidonura varians commonly known as the blue velvet headshield slug or blue velvet nudibranch, is a species of small sea slug, a marine opisthobranch gastropod mollusc in the order Cephalaspidea, the headshield slugs.

== Description and habitat ==
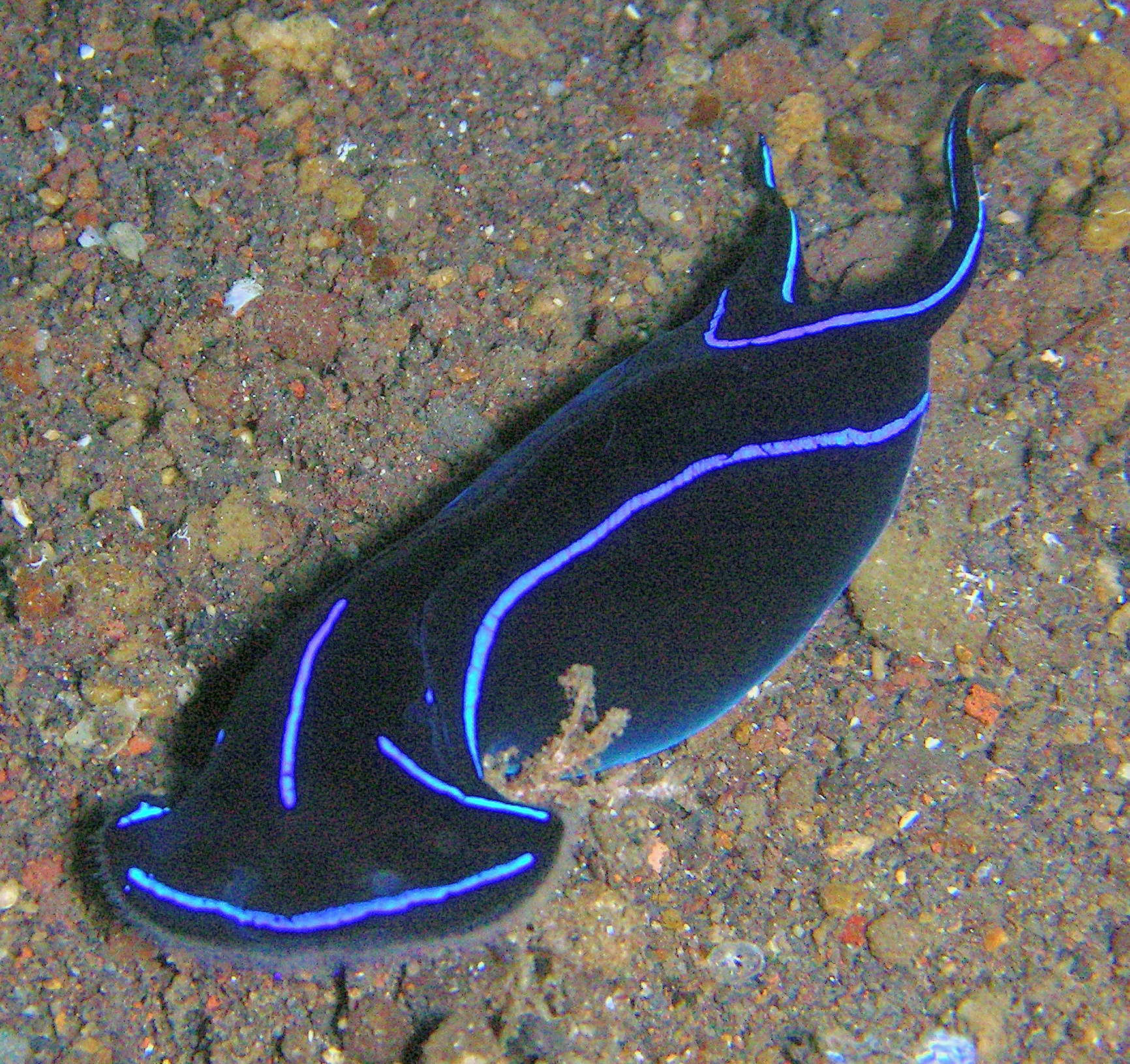

This species has a maximum size of 70 mm. The background color is deep black. The margin of the parapods and body are marked with a thin electric blue line. The two rather long "tails" at the end of the animal are characteristic of the genus Chelidonura, the left one is always longer. They have also well-developed sensory cilia on the anterior edge of the head which are used to find their prey.

This species lives on reef areas in shallow water lagoons with sandy or muddy bottom until 30 m depth.

== Distribution ==
This cephalaspidean is widespread in the tropical waters of the Indo-west Pacific region.

== Diet ==
Chelidonura varians feeds on flatworms and it is used in aquariums to eradicate small flat worm invasions.
