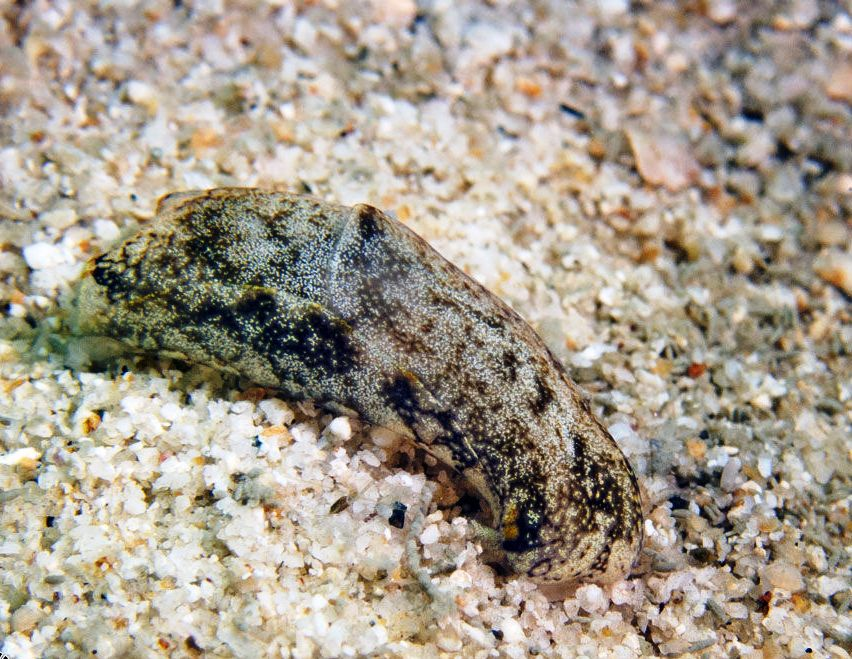

Scientific classification
- Domain: Eukaryota
- Kingdom: Animalia
- Phylum: Mollusca
- Class: Gastropoda
- Order: Cephalaspidea
- Family: Aglajidae
- Genus: Philinopsis
- Species: P. gigliolii

Binomial name
- Philinopsis gigliolii (Tapparone Canefri, 1874)

Synonyms
- Aglaia taronga J. K. Allan, 1933 (incorrect spelling of genus name); Aglaja taronga Allan, 1933 (basionym); Chelidonura aureopunctata Rudman, 1968; Doridium gigliolii (Tapparone Canefri, 1874) superseded combination; Philinopsis taronga (J. K. Allan, 1933) junior subjective synonym

= Philinopsis gigliolii =

Species of gastropod

Philinopsis gigliolii is a species of small and colorful aglajid sea slug, a shell-less opisthobranch gastropod mollusk in the family Aglajidae.

== Distribution ==
It has an Indo-Pacific distribution in southeastern Australia and northern New Zealand.
