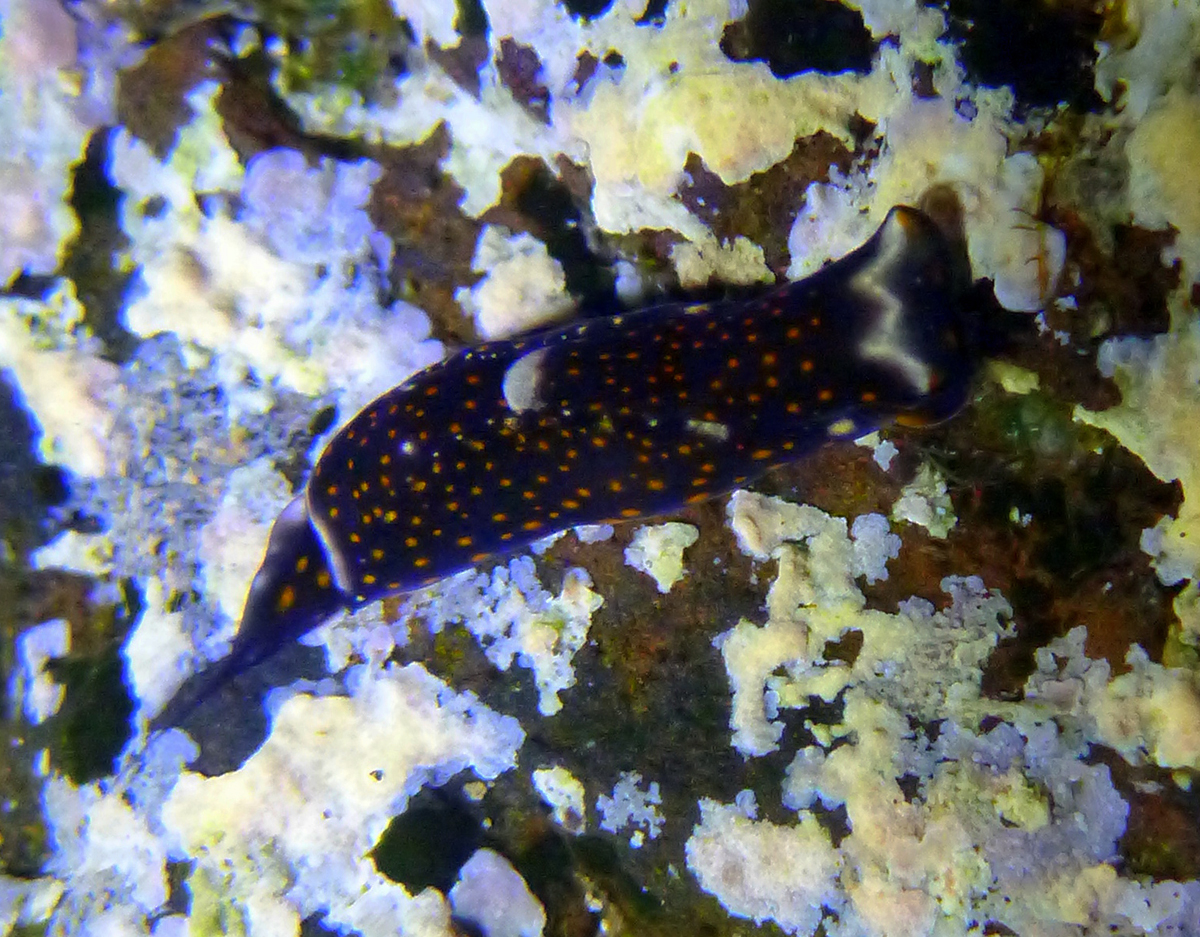

Scientific classification
- Kingdom: Animalia
- Phylum: Mollusca
- Class: Gastropoda
- Order: Cephalaspidea
- Family: Aglajidae
- Genus: Biuve
- Species: B. fulvipunctata

Binomial name
- Biuve fulvipunctata (Baba, 1938)

Synonyms
- Chelidonura fulvipunctata Baba, 1938; Chelidonura conformata Burn, 1966; Chelidonura mediterranea Swennen, 1961

= Biuve fulvipunctata =

Species of gastropod

Biuve fulvipunctata, the white-speckled headshield slug, is a species of sea slug or headshield slug, a marine opisthobranch gastropod mollusc in the family Aglajidae. This species is widespread in the Indian and Pacific Oceans but has invaded the Mediterranean Sea since 1961, despite apparently being absent from the Red Sea until recorded there in the 21st century. It is the only species in the monotypic genus Biuve.

== Etymology ==
The former generic name Chelidonura means "swallow-tail" referring to the two lobes which extend out from the back of the mantle shield, while the specific name fulvipunctata is a compound meaning tawny or dull yellow (fulvus) and spotted (punctata).

== Distribution ==
Biuve fulvipunctata is widely distributed in the western Pacific from Mexico and Hawaii west to Japan and the east coast of Australia and Lord Howe Island, through Indonesia and the tropical Indian Ocean to the Mascarene Islands, Mozambique and South Africa. It is rare in the Mediterranean where it was first recorded in 1961 off Turkey but it has now been recorded off the France, Balearic Islands, Malta, Cyprus and Israel. It was recorded in the Red Sea for the first time in 2005, most likely as a result of anti-Lessepsian migration, although it is possible that B. fulvipunctata entered the Mediterranean through the Suez Canal from the Red Sea. The most likely source of B. fulvipunctata reaching the Mediterranean is transport on shipping, the original discovery site of B. fulvipunctata in the Mediterranean being a former traditional boat building locale in southern Turkey which is popular with recreational yacht sailors. It was reported from Canary Islands in 2016.

== Description ==
An elongated, somewhat cylindrical gastropod, B. fulvipunctata has an internal, very thin shell. Its body is divided into a cephalic shield and a visceral hump which is, partly covered by a posterior mantle shield. The cephalic shield has its anterior edge wider than the posterior point and it is roughly divided. The eyes are situated on the front of the head and almost invisible as they are obscured by the dorsal surface. The mouth is flanked on either side by a mound which is covered in sensory bristles. The animal's foot is expanded into two lateral parapodia. The two long and symmetrical parapodia fold over and partially cover the dorsal surface. A pair of tapering lobes extend from the rear of the mantle shield, the left one is longer while the right lobe is much shorter.

This species typically has a background colour of black or dark brown with a bluish sheen marked with yellowish or orange spots, although some specimens are reddish brown with small yellow spots. A distinguishing feature is a white mark shaped like the letter w across the anterior edge of the head, although this may only be partially visible on some specimens, and a white or pale yellow crescent-shaped spot at the posterior edge of the head shield. They are normally between 10–20 millimetres (0.39–0.79 in) in length and in Australia they do not normally exceed 18 millimetres (0.71 in) but in the Mediterranean specimens of 33 millimetres (1.3 in) have been recorded.

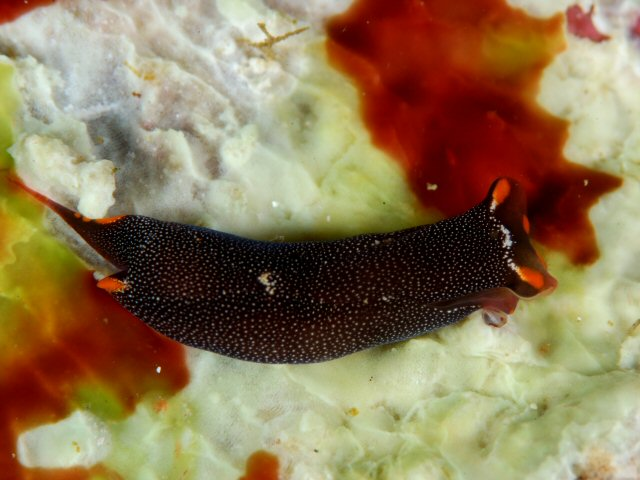
B. fulvipunctata in black with small spots.

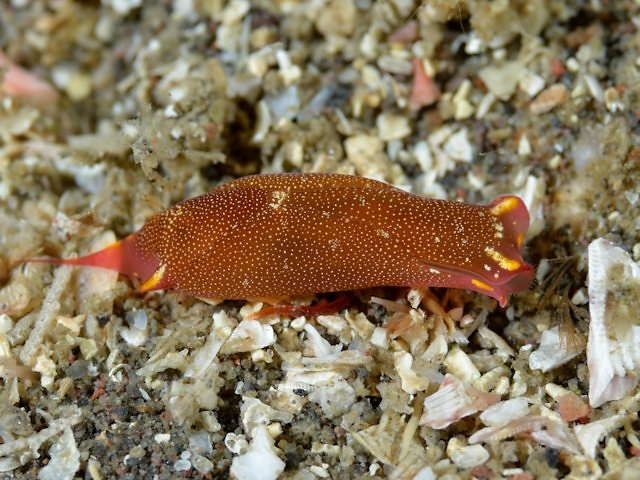
B. fulvipunctata in reddish brown with small yellow spots.

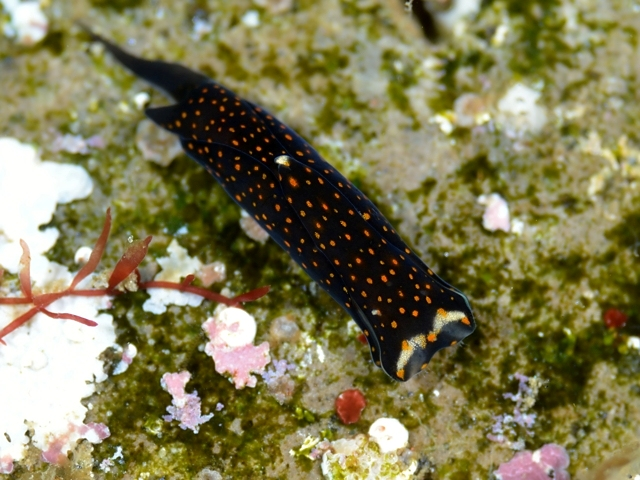
B. fulvipunctata with a spot at the posterior edge of the head shield.

== Biology ==
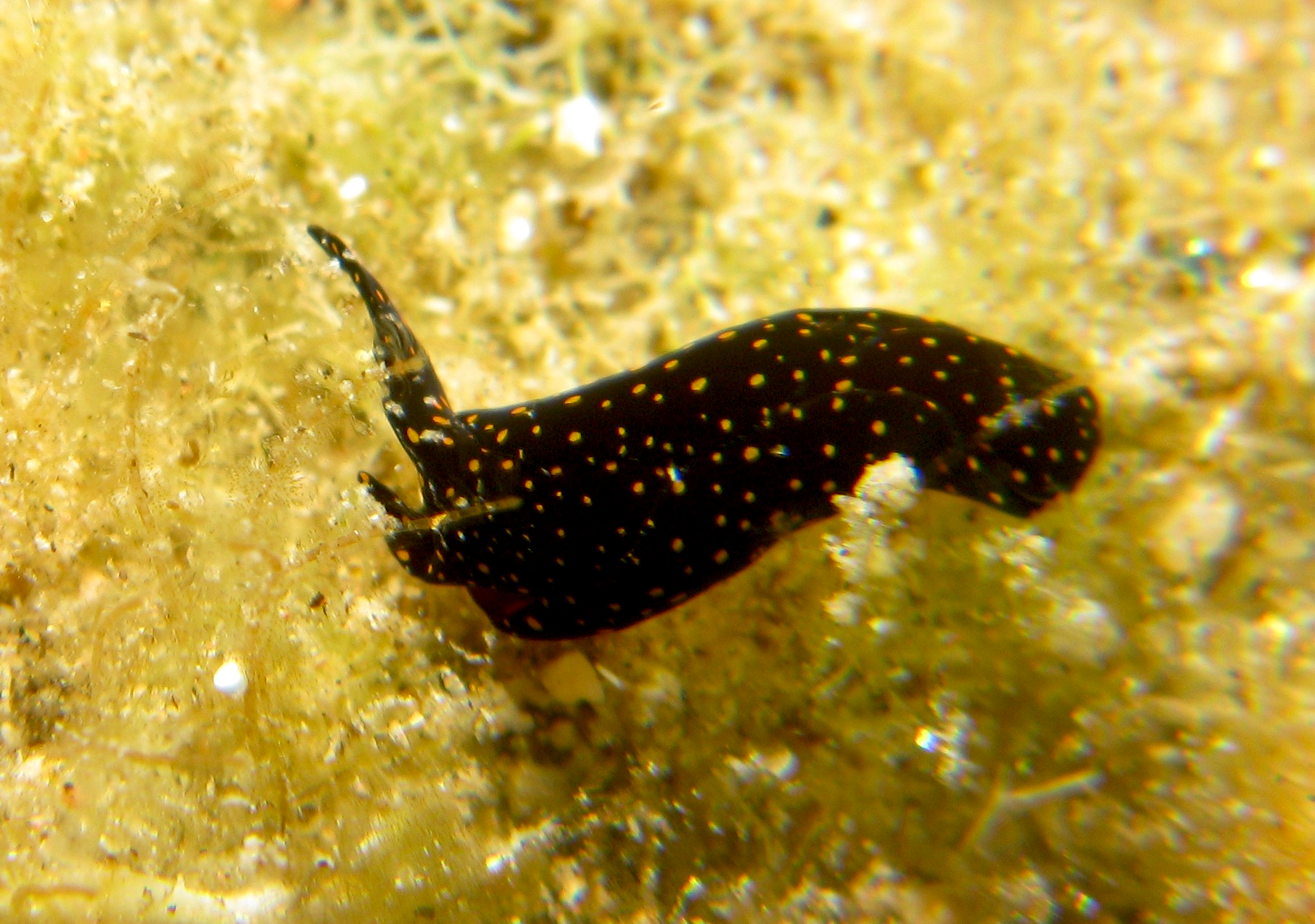
C. fulvipunctata juvenile

The preferred habitat is rocky or sandy areas with large amounts of algal debris from the low water mark to 20 metres (66 ft) in depth; it can occur in both sheltered and exposed sites. It is nocturnal and, like species in the genus Chelidonura, it is known to feed on small polychaete worms and acoelomate flatworms, prey is detected using the sensory mounds on either side of the mouth. The eggs are laid in strings covered in mucus, debris adheres to the mucus strengthening and camouflaging the strings of eggs. In laboratory conditions the eggs hatch in four days. The few specimens found in the Mediterranean have been found under stones at 3 metres (9.8 ft) depth and on rocky substrate at 12 metres (39 ft) in depth.

== Taxonomy ==
This species was originally placed in the genus Chelidonura but in 2017 the family Aglajidae was reclassified after a number of genera, including Chelidonura, were found to be paraphyletic and this species was placed in the new monotypic genus Biuve.
