= Philinopsis speciosa =

Scientific classification
- Kingdom: Animalia
- Phylum: Mollusca
- Class: Gastropoda
- Order: Cephalaspidea
- Family: Aglajidae
- Genus: Philinopsis
- Species: P. speciosa

Binomial name
- Philinopsis speciosa Pease, 1860

Synonyms
- Aglaja cyanea (E. von Martens, 1879); Aglaja gigliolii Tapparone Canefri, 1874; Aglaja iwasai Hirase, 1936; Doridium capense Bergh, 1908; Doridium cyaneum E. von Martens, 1879; Doridium guttatum E. von Martens, 1880; Doridium marmoratum E. A. Smith, 1884; Philinopsis cyanea (E. von Martens, 1879)

Species of gastropod

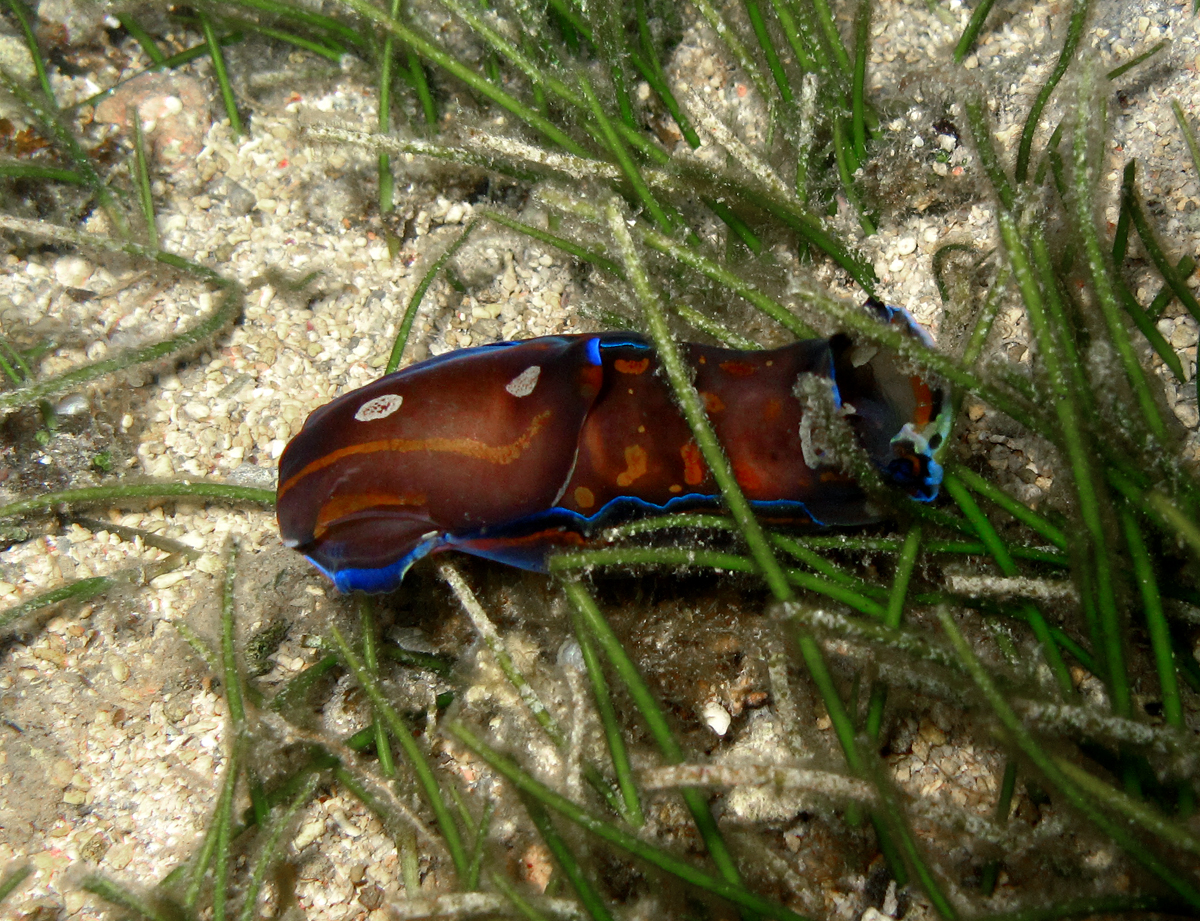
At Reunion

Philinopsis speciosa, the blue-lined philinopsis, is a species of sea slug, a shell-less opisthobranch gastropod mollusc in the family Aglajidae.

It is native to the Indo-Pacific region.

== Description ==
Philinopsis speciosa is a large mollusc, growing to a length of about 125 mm (5 in). It has a well-developed, broad headshield, with a squared front and tapering rear, terminating in an upright tube; the headshield is used for gliding over and burrowing beneath the surface of the sand. Behind the headshield is a body shield which bears two, rounded lobes at the back. On either side of the body are lateral outgrowths known as parapodia. The colour of this sea slug is very variable; it is usually brown, dark brown or black, with white, cream, yellow or orange spots, and a thin blue line or streaks around the margin. There is sometimes an additional white or yellow line at the margin, and a pair of longitudinal orangish bands may be present near the midline of the headshield.

== Distribution and habitat ==
Philinopsis speciosa has a widespread distribution in the tropical Indo-Pacific region, its range extending from the east coast of Africa and the Red Sea to Japan, Hawaii and New Caledonia. It is found on the lower shore and the subtidal zone, on sandy and clay bottoms and among seaweed, at depths down to about 20 m (66 ft).

== Ecology ==
Like other members of the Aglajidae, Philinopsis speciosa is a predator. Its prey consists mostly of other gastropod molluscs. It has no radula, but has a partially eversible pharynx which can suck up and engulf its prey, swallowing it whole. After digestion of the soft tissues, any shell or indigestible material is regurgitated.

Philinopsis speciosa is a hermaphrodite; two or more individuals form a circle or a short chain. The penis is on the right, level with the head, and the female genital opening is on the right side further back. The first individual acts as a female and receives sperm from the second, which acts as both male and female, giving sperm to the first, and receiving sperm from the third. The last slug in the line acts only as a male. The white eggs are wrapped in a thin layer of mucus and this strand is wound around the slug's head in a tangled cylinder. The slug then removes its head from the cylinder and sticks the end of the filament to the substrate.
