= Stefano Andrea Renier =

Italian naturalist, zoologist and scientist

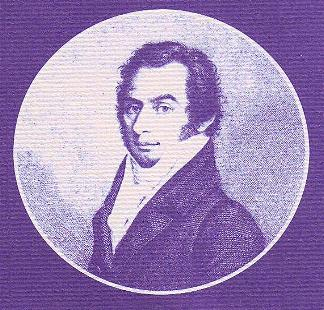
- Born: 25 January 1759; Chioggia, Republic of Venice
- Died: 6 January 1830 (aged 70); Padua, Austrian Empire
- Occupations: Naturalist, zoologist, scientist

Stefano Andrea Renier (25 January 1759, Chioggia, Italy – 6 January 1830, Padua, Italy) was an Italian naturalist, zoologist and scientist.

== Biography ==
Renier was born into a mainland noble family (not related to the homonymous Venetian patrician family), the son of Domenico Andrea and Caterina Airoldi. He studied in Padua, where he graduated in medicine in 1781.

After graduation, Renier practiced medicine in Bologna, Florence, and Chioggia, where he held the position of health officer. In 1806, he was appointed professor of natural history at the University of Padua. In 1814, he was among the professors suspended from teaching because they were suspected of pro-French sentiment.

Renier authored important studies in zoology and marine biology, particularly on mollusks and shells of the Adriatic, topics on which he published a significant treatise. One of his early works concerned the colonial ascidian genus Botryllus (Styelidae). He introduced a new method of zoological classification based on the development of the nervous system. His research earned praise from Jean-Baptiste Lamarck, which brought him European recognition. Later, he was commissioned by the Austrian government to create three marine zoological collections for the universities of Bologna, Padua, and Pavia (F. Barbagli). Part of his collection of marine animals was sold in 1818 to the Natural History Cabinet in Vienna.

Renier was also a member of Italian and international scientific academies and societies of the time, including the Venetian Institute of Sciences, Letters and Arts. One of his students was Giandomenico Nardo.

== Selected works ==
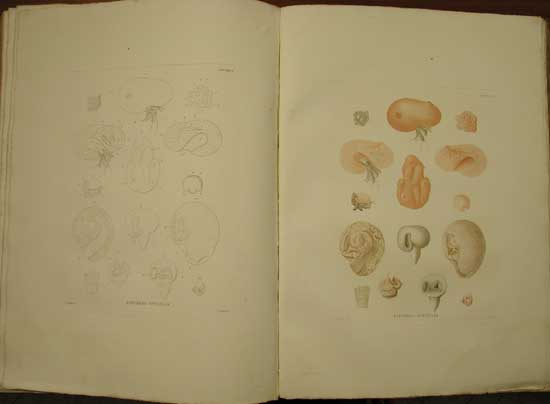
S.A. Renier: Treatise on Adriatic Zoology

- Sopra il Botrillo piantanimale marino (On the marine plant-animal Botrillo), 1793.
- Sistema attuale e piano di regolazione sulle farine di frumento ad uso e consumo della città di Chiozza e suo territorio (Current system and plan of regulation on wheat flour for the use and consumption of the city of Chiozza and its territory), Venice, Dalle Stampe di Antonio Zatta, 1794.
- Prospetto della classe dei Vermi (Overview of the class of Worms), 1804.
- Tavola alfabetica delle conchiglie Adriatiche (Alphabetical table of Adriatic shells), 1807.
- Tavole per servire alla classificazione e connoscenza degli Animali (Tables for the classification and understanding of Animals), 1807.
- Nuove tavole di zoologia (New tables of zoology), 1809.
- Esame e giudizio ricercato sulla questione di che specie di squalo sia un Ittiolito delle Cave Bolchesi (Examination and sought judgment on the question of what species of shark is an Ittiolito delle Cave Bolchesi), Tipografia della Minerva, Padua, 1821.
- Prospetto della classe dei Vermi (Overview of the class of Worms), 1804.
- Elementi di mineralogia (Elements of mineralogy), pp. XX, 616, Tipografia Crescini, Padua, 1823; 1828.
- Elementi di zoologia (Elements of zoology), 1828.
- Osservazioni postume di Zoologia Adriatica (Posthumous observations on Adriatic Zoology), Tipografia Giovanni Cecchini, Venice, 1847.

== Bibliography ==
- Barbagli F., La Laguna Veneta e il Museo di Storia Naturale di Pavia, Rivista di Studi e Ricerche, 18, 2001, pp. 147–156.
- Cibin C., Stefano Andrea Renier naturalista e riformatore, 167 p., 1 ritr., CGE, Chioggia, 1981.
- De Tipaldo E., Biografia degli italiani illustri, vol. I, pp. 377–380, Tipografia Alvisopoli, Venice, 1834–1840.
- Nardo G.D., Biografia scientifica di Stefano Andrea Renier, 56 p., G. Antonelli Editore, Venice, 1847.
- Tiozzo P.G., Stefano Andrea Renier, Venice, 1979.
- Entry Stefano Andrea Renier, in Enciclopedia Italiana, XXIX, p. 68, Istituto della Enciclopedia Italiana, Rome, 1936.
- Entry Stefano Andrea Renier, in Enciclopedia Biografica Universale Treccani, XVI, p. 326, Istituto della Enciclopedia Italiana, Rome, 2007.
- Wurzbach E.V., Biographisches Lexikon des Kaiserthums Oesterreich, vol. XXV, pp. 286–287, Tipografia Alvisopoli, Vienna, 1857.

== See also ==
- Marine biology
- Zoology

== Sources ==
- "Renièr, Stefano Andrea – Treccani". Treccani (in Italian). Retrieved 2024-02-26.
- "RENIER, Stefano Andrea – Treccani". Enciclopedia Italiana (1936). Treccani (in Italian). Retrieved 2024-02-26.
- "RENIER, Stefano Andrea – Treccani". Dizionario Biografico degli Italiani – Volume 86 (2016). Treccani (in Italian). Retrieved 2024-02-26.
- Dokumentation, Österreichisches Biographisches Lexikon und biographische (2003). "Renier, Stefano Andrea". ISBN 978-3-7001-3213-4 (in German). Retrieved 2024-02-26.
- OpenLibrary.org. "Stefano Andrea Renier". Open Library. Retrieved 2024-02-26.
- "ALO docView – 25 Biographisches Lexikon des Kaisertums Österreich (1868)". www.literature.at. Retrieved 2024-02-26.
- "Stefano Andrea Renier". worldcat.org. Retrieved 2024-02-26.
