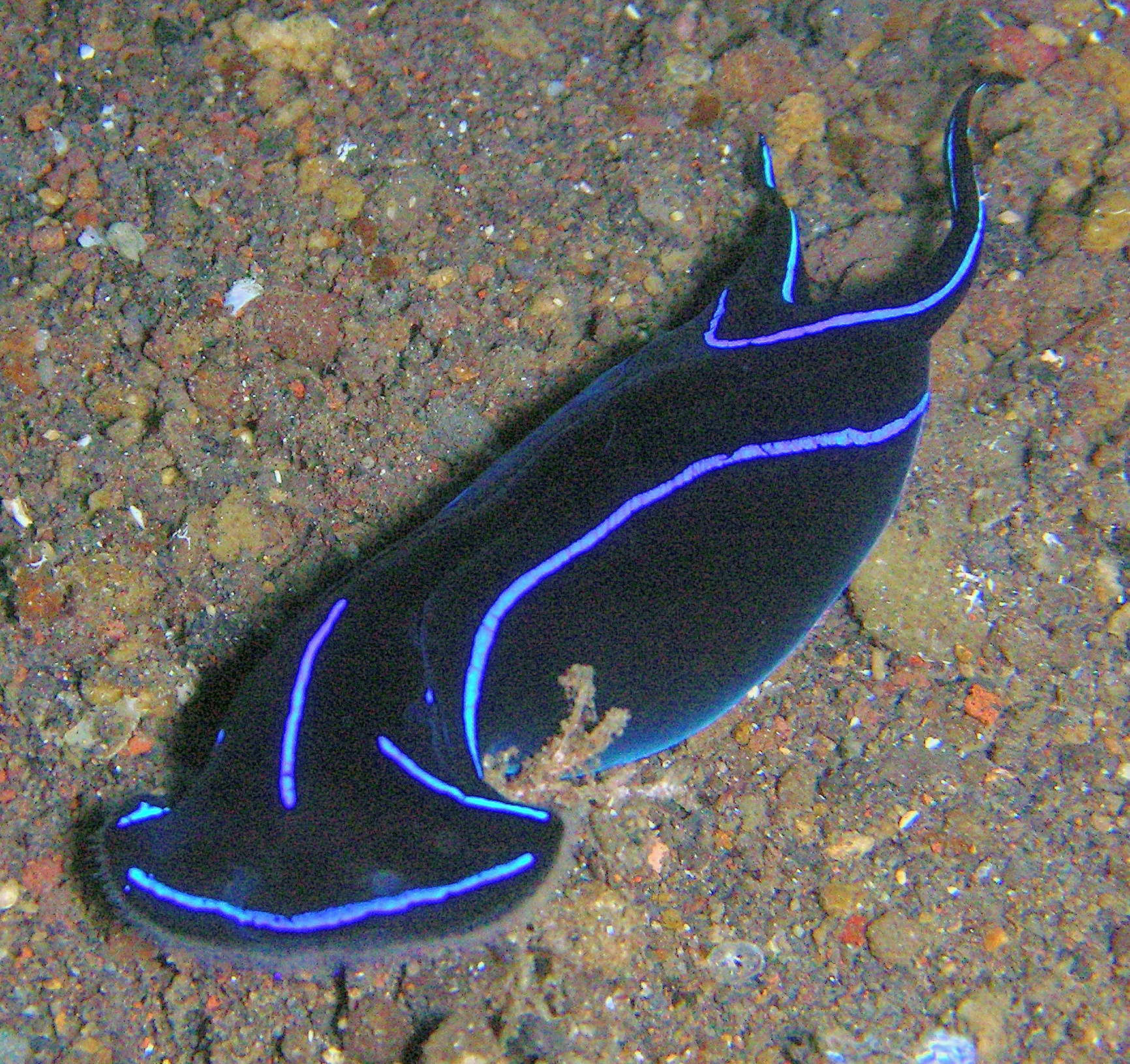
- Chelidonura varians, head end towards the lower left

Scientific classification
- Kingdom: Animalia
- Phylum: Mollusca
- Class: Gastropoda
- Order: Cephalaspidea
- Superfamily: Philinoidea
- Family: Aglajidae; Pilsbry, 1895 (1847)

Genera
- See text

Synonyms
- Chelidonuridae Habe, 1961; Doridiidae Gray, 1847 (Placed on the Official Index by ICZN Opinion 1079); Sinistrobranchidae d´Orbigny, 1841 (Name not available: not based on a name (ICZN, Art. 11.7.1.1.))

= Aglajidae =

Family of gastropods

Aglajidae is a family of often colorful, medium-sized, sea slugs, marine opisthobranch gastropod mollusks. These are not nudibranchs; instead they are headshield slugs, in the superfamily Philinoidea.

== Note on the authority and dates ==
Family names such as this one, Aglajidae Pilsbry, 1895 (1847), that have two dates (the second one in parentheses) are those names which are ruled by Article 40(2) of the ICZN Code. "If ... a family-group name was replaced before 1961 because of the synonymy of the type genus, the replacement name is to be maintained if it is in prevailing usage. A name maintained by virtue of this Article retains its own author [and date, the first date cited] but takes the priority of the replaced name [the date cited in parentheses, here alluding to Doridiinae Gray, 1847]

== Genera ==
Genera and species within the family Aglajidae include:

- Aglaja Renier, 1807
- Aglaona Chaban, Ekimova, Schepetov & Chernyshev, 2022
- Biuve Zamora-Silva & Malaquias, 2017
- Camachoaglaja Zamora-Silva & Malaquias, 2017
- Chelidonura A. Adams, 1850
- Mannesia Zamora-Silva & Malaquias, 2017
- Mariaglaja Zamora-Silva & Malaquias, 2017
- Melanochlamys Cheeseman, 1881
- Nakamigawaia Kuroda & Habe, 1961
- Navanax Pilsbry, 1895
- Niparaya Zamora-Silva & Malaquias, 2017
- Odontoglaja Rudman, 1978
- Philinissima Chaban, Ekimova & Schepetov, 2023
- Philinopsis Pease, 1860
- Spinoaglaja Ortea, Moro & Espinosa, 2007
- Spinophallus Zamora-Silva & Malaquias, 2017
- Tubulophilinopsis Zamora-Silva & Malaquias, 2017

Genera currently in synonymy include:

- Acera Cuvier, 1810: synonym of Philinopsis Pease, 1860
- Aglaia Renier, 1804: synonym of Aglaja Renier, 1807
- Doridium Meckel, 1809: synonym of Aglaja Renier, 1807
- Eidothea Risso, 1826: synonym of Philinopsis Pease, 1860
- Hirundella J. E. Gray, 1850: synonym of Chelidonura A. Adansm 1850
- Migaya Ortea, Caballer & Espinosa, 2014: synonym of Nakamigawaia Kuroda & T. Habe, 1961
- Navarchus J. G. Cooper: synonym of Navanax Pislbry, 1895
- Posterobranchaea A. d'Orbigny, 1836: synonym of Navanax Pislbry, 1895
- Strategus J. G. Cooper, 1863: synonym of Navanax Pislbry, 1895

== Gallery ==
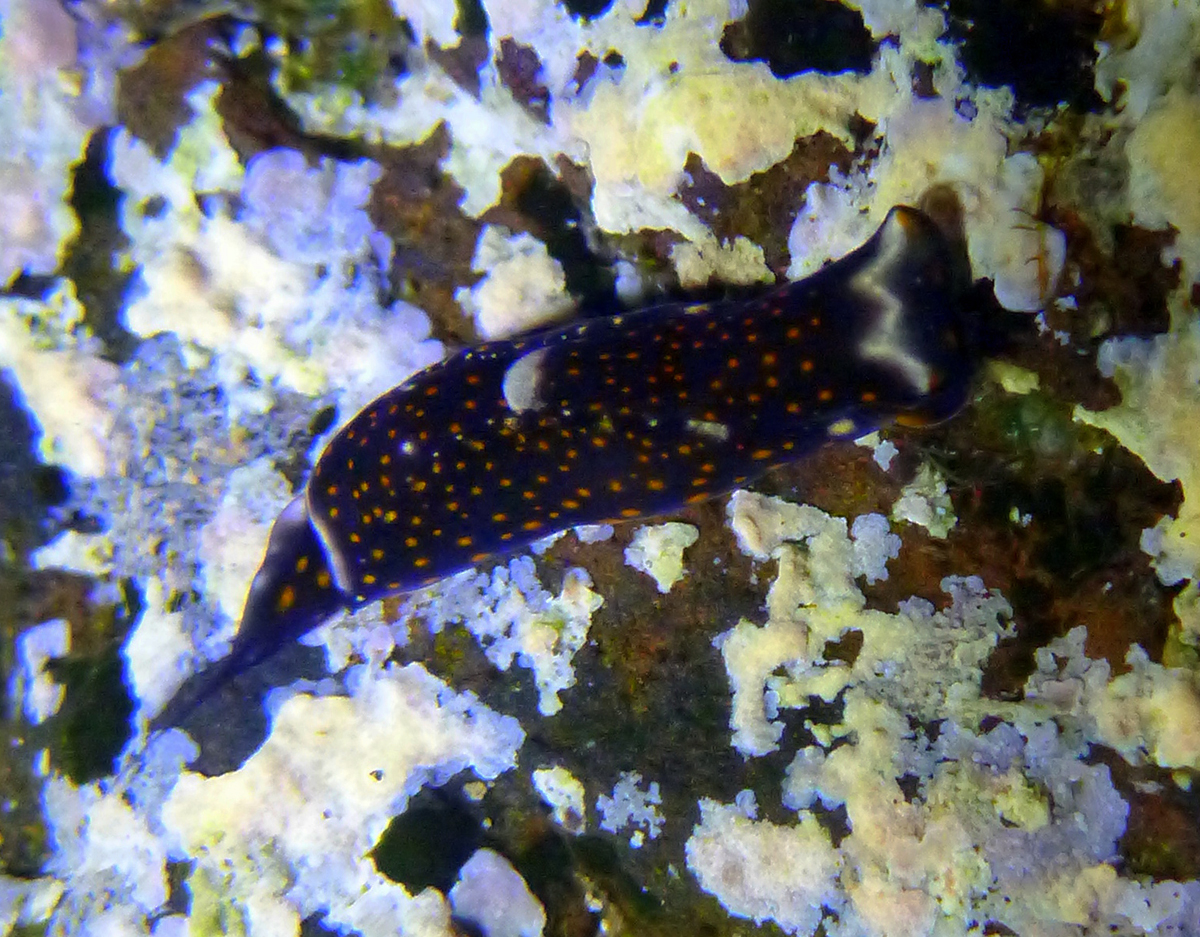
Biuve fulvipunctata

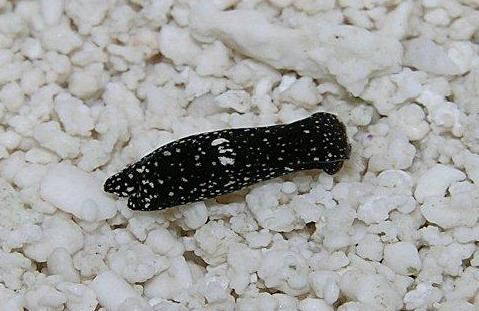
Camachoaglaja berolina

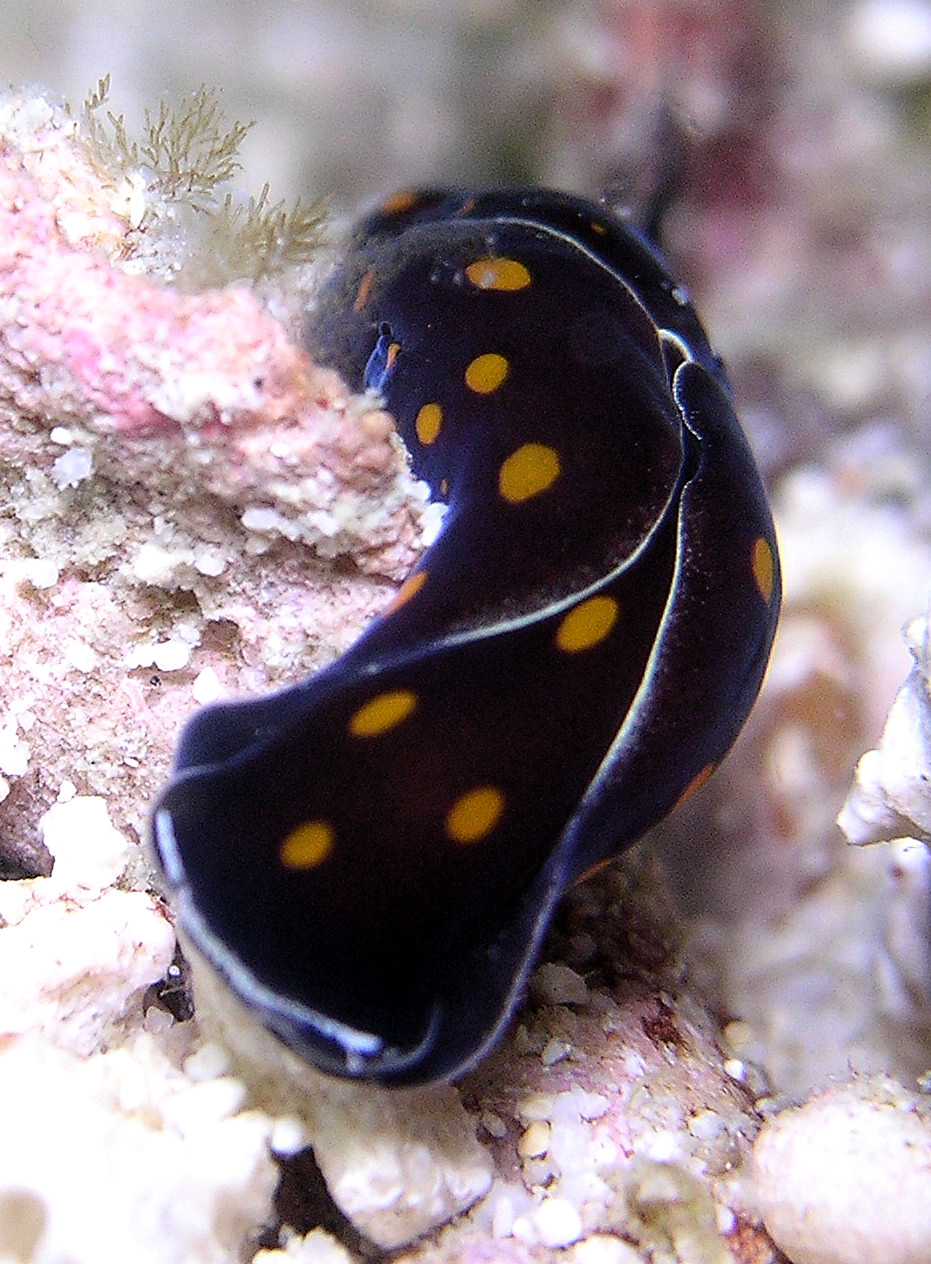
Chelidonura punctata

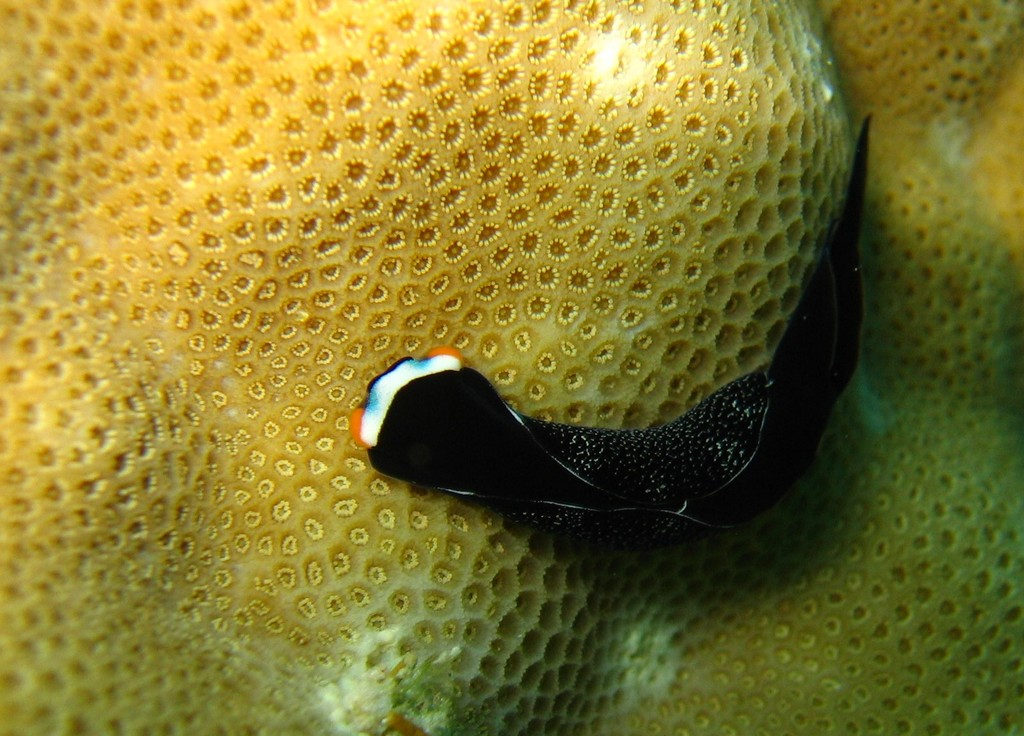
Mariaglaja inornata

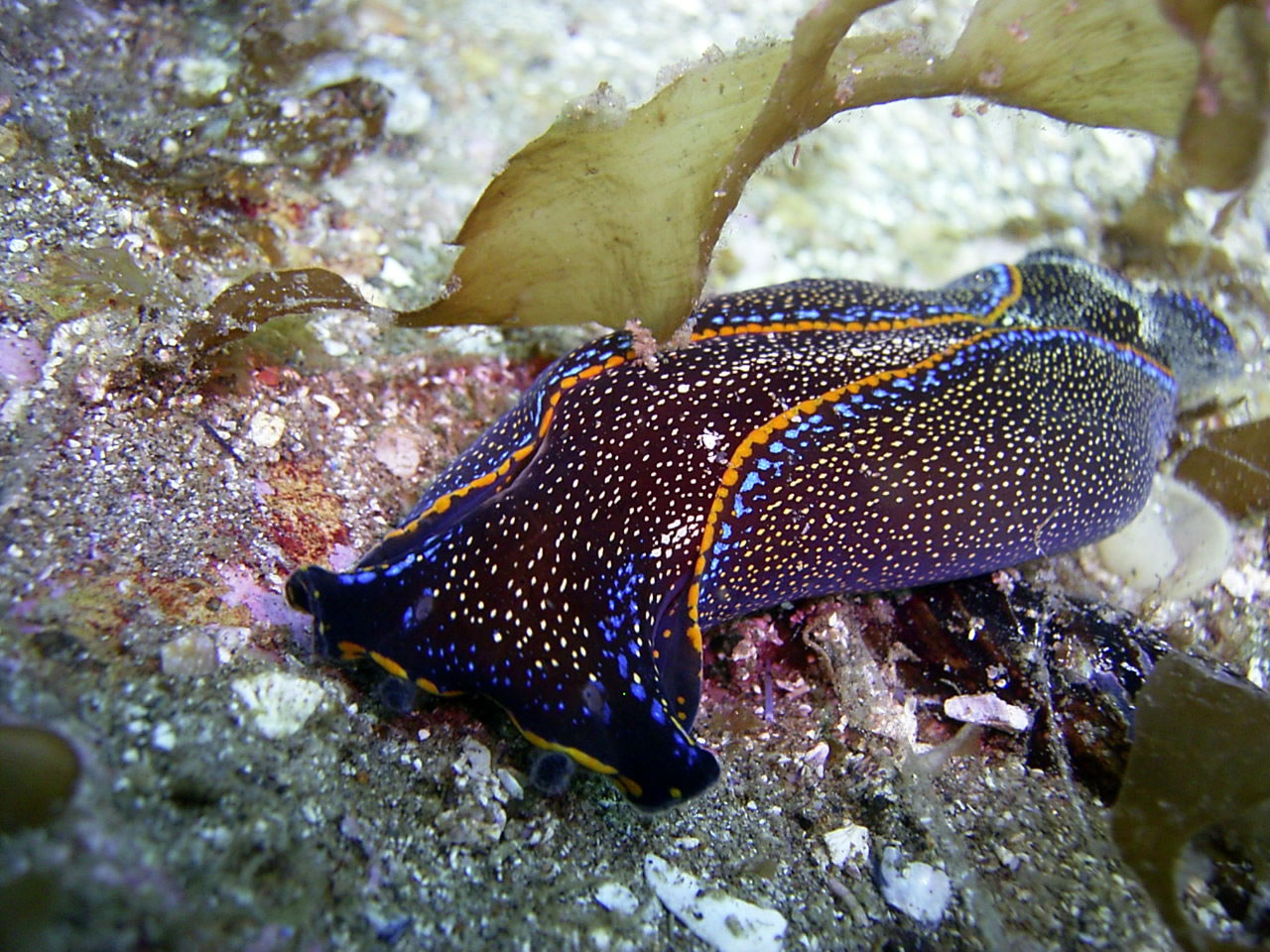
Navanax inermis

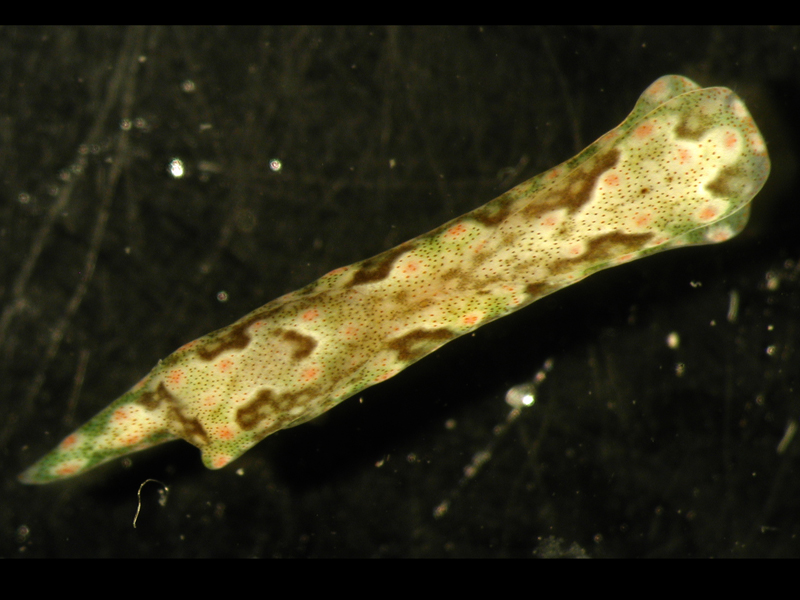
Odontoglaja guamensis

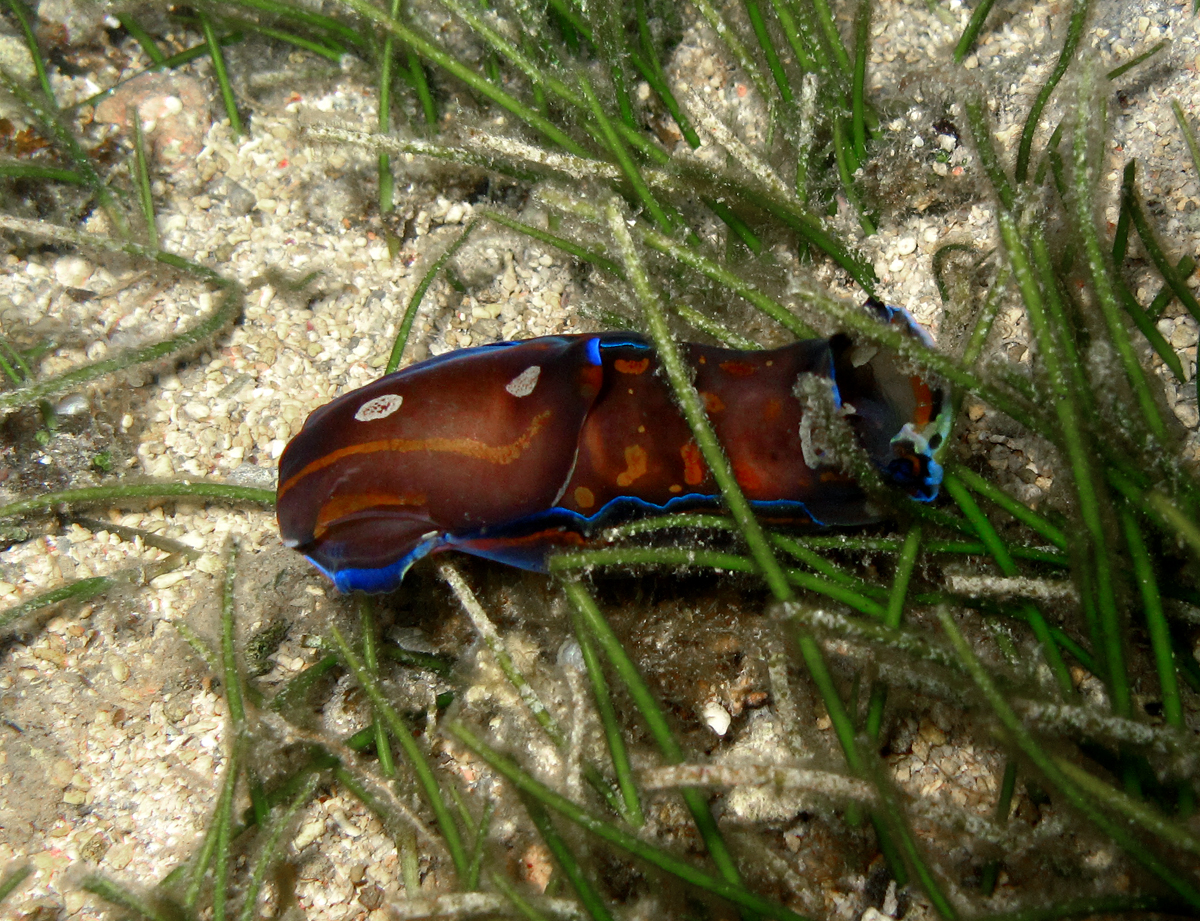
Philinopsis speciosa

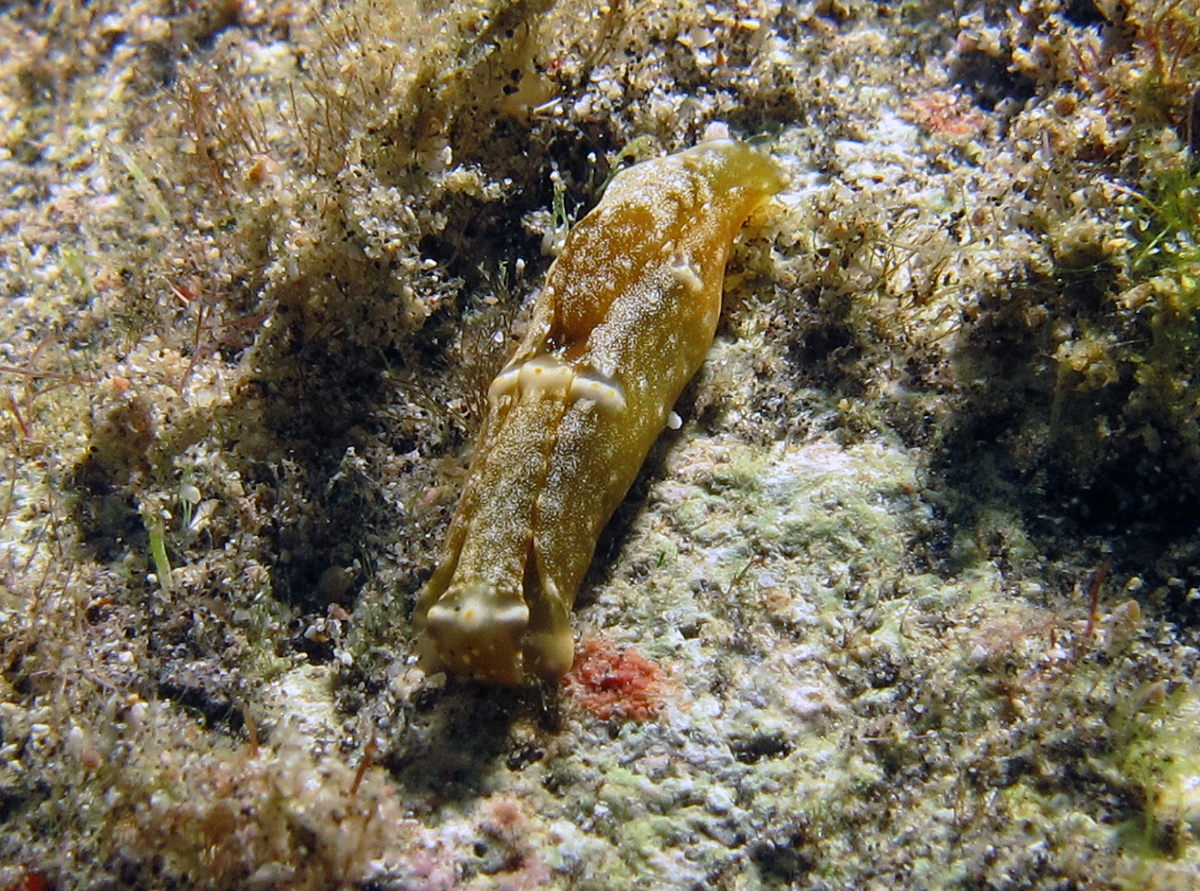
Spinoaglaja orientalis

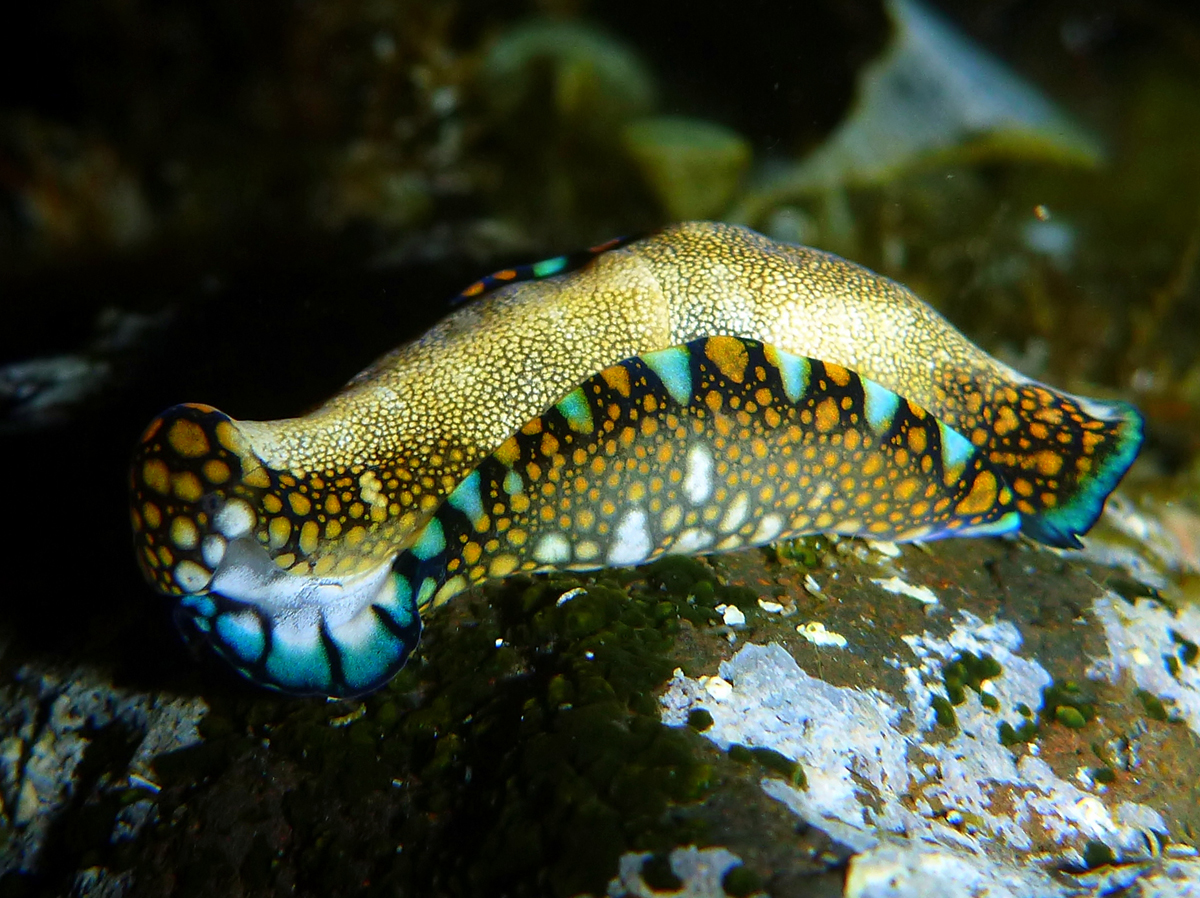
Tubulophilinopsis reticulata
