= Atys vixumbilicata =

Scientific classification
- Kingdom: Animalia
- Phylum: Mollusca
- Class: Gastropoda
- Order: Cephalaspidea
- Family: Haminoeidae
- Genus: Atys
- Species: A. vixumbilicata

Binomial name
- Atys vixumbilicata H.B. Preston, 1908

Species of gastropod

Atys vixumbilicata is a species of small tropical sea snail, a bubble snail, a marine opisthobranch gastropod mollusk in the family Haminoeidae, the haminoea bubble snails.

== Distribution ==
This marine species occurs off the Andaman Islands.

== Description ==
The length of the shell of this species attains 3.5 mm, its diameter 2 mm.

(Original description) The ovate shell is narrowly perforate. It has a pale yellowish horn colour. The shell is very finely spirally striate and rather coarsely grooved towards the ends. The apex is closed. The aperture is narrow above but broadening below. The.columella descends obliquely. The peristome is thickened and produced above the vertex.
