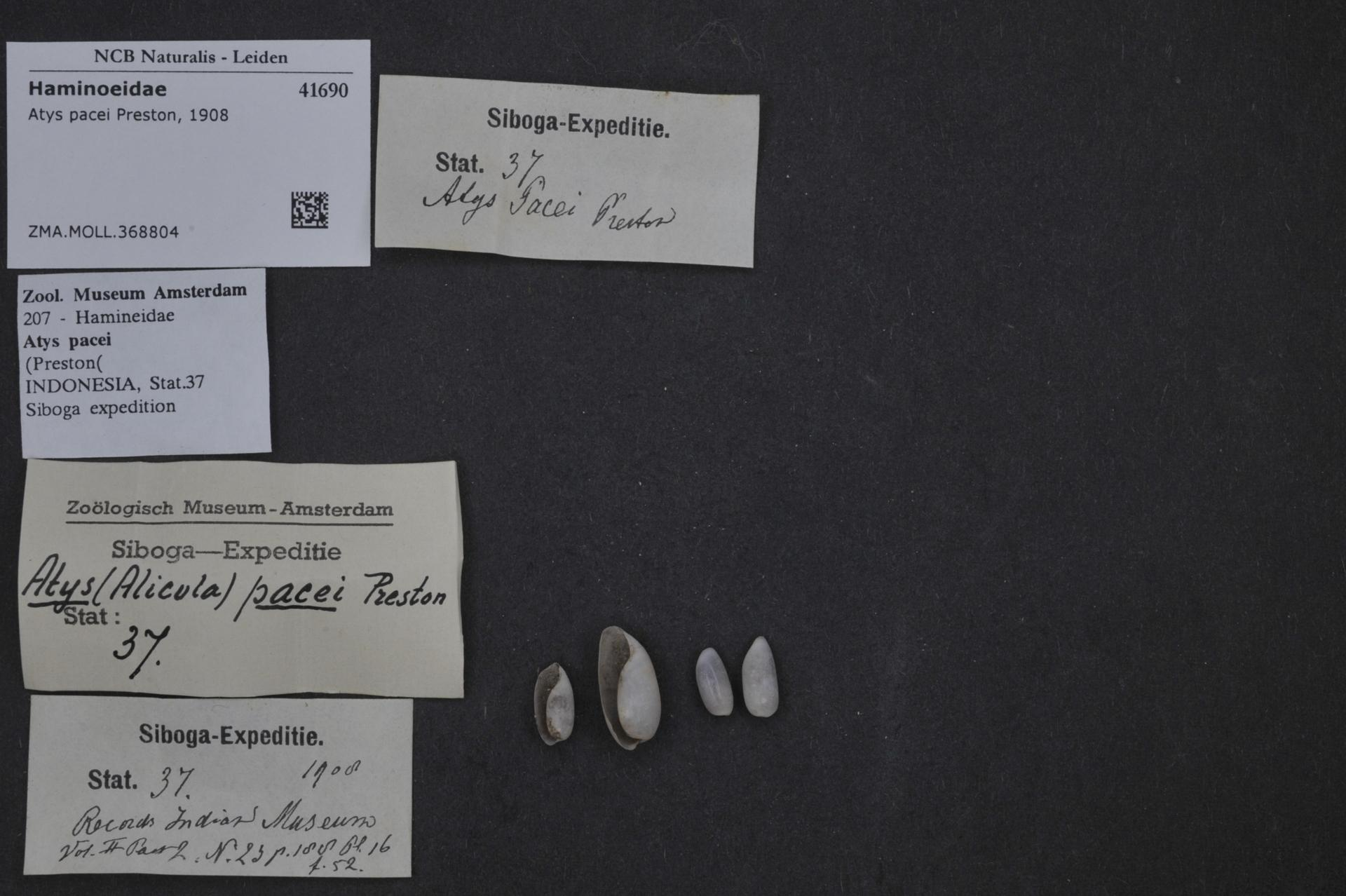
- Preserved specimen of Atys pacei

Scientific classification
- Kingdom: Animalia
- Phylum: Mollusca
- Class: Gastropoda
- Order: Cephalaspidea
- Family: Haminoeidae
- Genus: Atys
- Species: A. pacei

Binomial name
- Atys pacei H.B. Preston, 1908

= Atys pacei =

Species of gastropod

Atys pacei is a species of small tropical sea snail, a bubble snail, a marine opisthobranch gastropod mollusk in the family Haminoeidae, the haminoea bubble snails.

This is a taxon inquirendum.

== Distribution ==
This marine species occurs off the Andaman Islands.

== Description ==
The length of the shell of this species attains 11 mm, its diameter 5 mm.

(Original description) The straight shell is cylindrical. It is semi-transparent white. The shell is sculptured throughout with fine spiral striae, becoming more numerous and closely set towards the base. The apex is very narrowly perforate. The aperture is narrow above but dilated below. The columella is obliquely arched. The peristome is simple and rises above the vertex.
