= T. ehrenbergii =

T. ehrenbergii may refer to:

- Tigridia ehrenbergii, a shell flower
- Tolyposporium ehrenbergi, a smut fungus
- Tragacantha ehrenbergii, a terrestrial plant
