= Atys convexa =

Scientific classification
- Kingdom: Animalia
- Phylum: Mollusca
- Class: Gastropoda
- Order: Cephalaspidea
- Family: Haminoeidae
- Genus: Atys
- Species: A. convexa

Binomial name
- Atys convexa H.B. Preston, 1908

Species of gastropod

Atys convexa is a species of small tropical sea snail, a bubble snail, a marine opisthobranch gastropod mollusk in the family Haminoeidae, the haminoea bubble snails.

== Distribution ==
This marine species occurs off the Andaman Islands.

== Description ==
The length of the shell of this species attains 3.25 mm, its diameter 2 mm.

(Original description) The umbilicate shell is tumid, ovate and constricted at the ends. It has a pale lemon colour, with two irregular narrow greenish bands especially noticeable on the ventral surface. It is smooth, polished except at the ends where it is spirally grooved. The apex is closed. The aperture is narrow above but broadening below. The columella descends obliquely, curved outwards and produced. The peristome is simple, rising high above the vertex.
