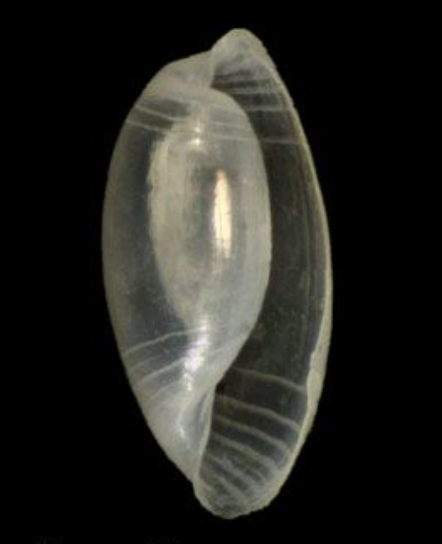
- Shell of Atys angustatus (specimen at the Natural History Museum Rotterdam)

Scientific classification
- Kingdom: Animalia
- Phylum: Mollusca
- Class: Gastropoda
- Order: Cephalaspidea
- Family: Haminoeidae
- Genus: Atys
- Species: A. angustatus

Binomial name
- Atys angustatus E. A. Smith, 1872

= Atys angustatus =

Species of gastropod

Atys convexa is a species of small tropical sea snail, a bubble snail, a marine opisthobranch gastropod mollusk in the family Haminoeidae, the haminoea bubble snails.

== Description ==
The length of the shell of this species attains 5 mm, its diameter 2.7 mm.

(Original description in Latin) The small shell is white, semi-transparent, and shiny. It has an elongated-oval shape, which is somewhat tapered at both the top and the base; these ends are strongly striated, while the middle section is smooth. The aperture is narrow and barely widens toward the base. The outer lip is thin and joins at the middle of the apex, where it is significantly thickened and curved. The columella is short, straight, and slightly reflected.

This is a very narrow species, attenuated at each end and obscurely angulated in the middle ; the outer lip is very thick at its junction with the middle of the vertex, and strongly sinuated; the superior and inferior striae are each about twelve in number.

== Distribution ==
This marine species occurs in the Gulf of Suez; in the Mediterranean Sea off Israel and Turkey.
