= Atys neglectus =

Scientific classification
- Kingdom: Animalia
- Phylum: Mollusca
- Class: Gastropoda
- Order: Cephalaspidea
- Family: Haminoeidae
- Genus: Atys
- Species: A. neglectus

Binomial name
- Atys neglectus H.B. Preston, 1908

Synonyms
- Atys neglecta Preston, 1908 (wrong grammatical agreement in original publication)

Species of gastropod

Atys neglectus is a species of small tropical sea snail, a bubble snail, a marine opisthobranch gastropod mollusk in the family Haminoeidae, the haminoea bubble snails.

== Distribution ==
This marine species occurs off the Andaman Islands.

== Description ==
The length of the shell of this species attains 4 mm, its diameter 2 mm.

(Original description) The imperforate shell is elongately ovate, sub-cylindrical, rather convex in the middle. It is greyish white, polished, smooth except at the ends where several grooves appear. The apex is closed. The aperture is very narrow above and moderately wide below. The columella is oblique. The peristome is broadly thickened, and bent slightly inwards, a little extended above the vertex.
