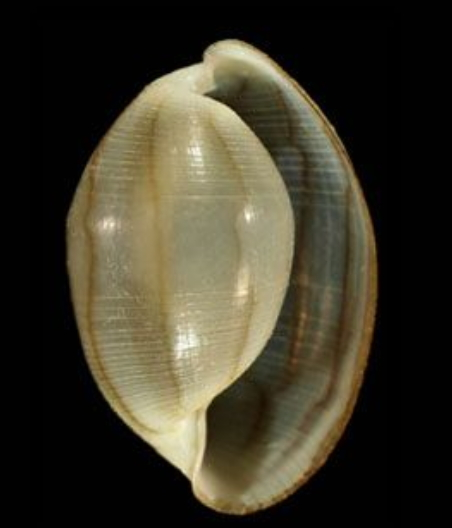
- Shell of Atys kuhnsi (specimen at the Natural History Museum Rotterdam)

Scientific classification
- Kingdom: Animalia
- Phylum: Mollusca
- Class: Gastropoda
- Order: Cephalaspidea
- Family: Haminoeidae
- Genus: Atys
- Species: A. kuhnsi

Binomial name
- Atys kuhnsi Pilsbry, 1917

= Atys kuhnsi =

Species of gastropod

Atys kuhnsi is a species of small tropical sea snail, a bubble snail, a marine opisthobranch gastropod mollusk in the family Haminoeidae, the haminoea bubble snails.

== Description ==
The length of the shell attains 15.8 mm, its diameter 10 mm.

(Original description) The shell is narrowly umbilicate and oval in shape, with a diameter that measures approximately two-thirds of its length. It is widest slightly above the middle and possesses a thin, semi-transparent, white structure, which becomes an opaque white at the base and vertex.

The surface is marked with narrow, irregularly waved, and sometimes branching streaks of a tawny or cinnamon-brown hue.

The surface is naturally glossy and is defined by a sculpture of engraved encircling grooves. The intervals between these grooves are closely sculptured with circular striae near the ends, but they become smooth toward the middle where the grooves are spaced wider apart. In all but the largest individuals, a smooth zone exists in the middle, though this area narrows progressively as the animal ages. The vertex (summit of the shell) features a very small and shallow concavity situated about the posterior axis, while the axis itself possesses a moderate, oblique fold posteriorly. Finally, the columella is narrow and nearly straight, though a small prominence is visible below the middle, and the aperture is narrowly rounded anteriorly.

== Distribution ==
This marine species occurs off Hawaii.
