= A. ehrenbergii =

A. ehrenbergii may refer to:

- Anabasis ehrenbergii, a flowering plant
- Astragalus ehrenbergii, a terrestrial plant

== See also ==
- A. ehrenbergi (disambiguation)
