= Atys nonscriptus =

Scientific classification
- Kingdom: Animalia
- Phylum: Mollusca
- Class: Gastropoda
- Order: Cephalaspidea
- Family: Haminoeidae
- Genus: Atys
- Species: A. nonscriptus

Binomial name
- Atys nonscriptus (A. Adams, 1850)

Synonyms
- Atys nonscripta (A. Adams, 1850) incorrect grammatical agreement of specific epithet; Bulla (Atys) nonscripta A. Adams, 1850 superseded combination; Bulla nonscripta A. Adams, 1850 superseded combination

Species of gastropod

Atys nonscriptus, common name the clean-slate glassy-bubble, is a species of small tropical sea snail, a bubble snail, a marine opisthobranch gastropod mollusk in the family Haminoeidae, the haminoea bubble snails.

== Description ==
(Description by G.B. Sowerby II) The shell is ovate-cylindrical, white, and subpellucid in texture. The surface is longitudinally striated, appearing subtruncated posteriorly and produced anteriorly. While the inner lip remains rather straight, the outer lip is truncated anteriorly and ends in a distinct, dentiform fold.
