= Atys densus =

Scientific classification
- Kingdom: Animalia
- Phylum: Mollusca
- Class: Gastropoda
- Order: Cephalaspidea
- Family: Haminoeidae
- Genus: Atys
- Species: A. densus

Binomial name
- Atys densus Brazier, 1877

Synonyms
- Atys densa Brazier, 1877 (incorrect gender of species epithet)

Species of gastropod

Atys densus is a species of small tropical sea snail, a bubble snail, a marine opisthobranch gastropod mollusk in the family Haminoeidae, the haminoea bubble snails.

== Description ==
(Original description) The shell is small, oval, and thick, with a dirty white appearance. The surface is finely plicated and strongly striated in a transverse direction. Within the interstices, finer lines become visible when viewed under a lens. The aperture is narrow above but opens wide below. The outer lip is regularly arched; it is produced posteriorly, while anteriorly it is both twisted and produced, which allows it to partly cover the umbilicus.

== Distribution ==
This marine species is endemic to Australia and occurs in the Torres Strait and off Queensland.
