= Atys obscuratus =

Scientific classification
- Kingdom: Animalia
- Phylum: Mollusca
- Class: Gastropoda
- Order: Cephalaspidea
- Family: Haminoeidae
- Genus: Atys
- Species: A. obscuratus

Binomial name
- Atys obscuratus Dall, 1896

Synonyms
- Atys (Aliculastrum) obscuratus Dall, 1896

Species of gastropod

Atys obscuratus, common name the obscure glassy-bubble, is a species of small tropical sea snail, a bubble snail, a marine opisthobranch gastropod mollusk in the family Haminoeidae, the haminoea bubble snails.

== Description ==
The length of the shell attains 4 mm, its diameter 2 mm.

(Original description) The shell is small and notably wider than that of † Atys gracilis Dall, 1896. It differs from the latter species by possessing a lateral profile that is evenly curved, ensuring that no indication of an equatorial swelling is visible. Furthermore, the aperture is proportionately wider and less produced behind, while the inner lip above the spire is more strongly twisted.

At the spire, there is a shallow pit but no perforation, nor is there any thickened, striated rim present at the margin of the pit. Although the spiral grooving is similarly distributed, it appears rather sharper than in A. gracilis. Additionally, the columella is less obviously twisted; it is obliquely truncate and narrow, and it features a narrow but obvious groove located behind it.

== Distribution ==
This marine species occurs off North Carolina, USA (S.E. of Cape Fear: 26-29 m.)

Fossils of this species were found in Miocene strata on Jamaica and Florida, USA.
