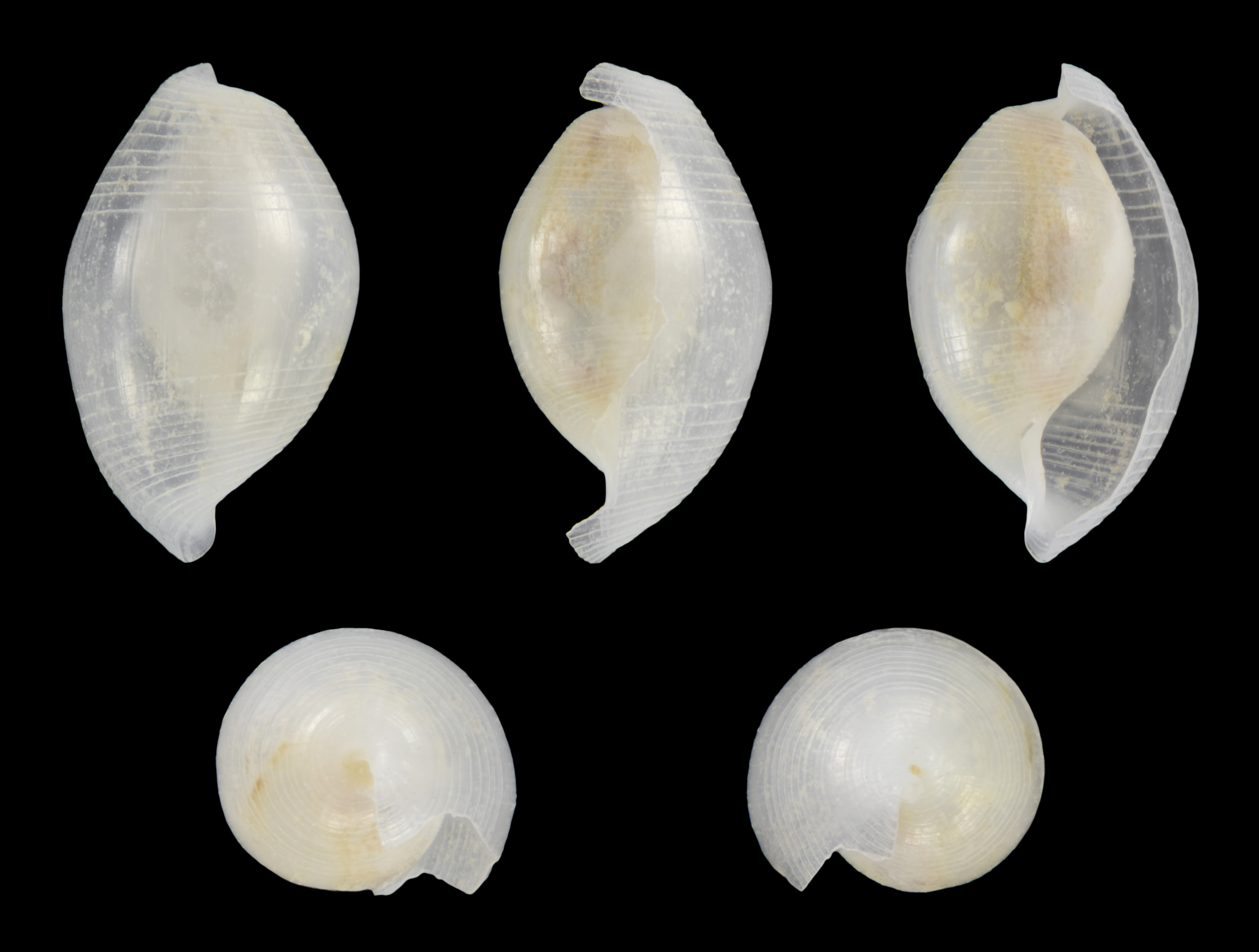
- Shell of Atys semistriatus

Scientific classification
- Kingdom: Animalia
- Phylum: Mollusca
- Class: Gastropoda
- Order: Cephalaspidea
- Family: Haminoeidae
- Genus: Atys
- Species: A. semistriatus

Binomial name
- Atys semistriatus Pease, 1860

Synonyms
- Atys semistriata Pease, 1860 incorrect grammatical agreement of specific epithet; Atys semistriatus fordinsulae Pilsbry, 1921 (junior synonym); Atys semistriatus mua Pilsbry, 1921

= Atys semistriatus =

Species of gastropod

Atys semistriatus, common name the semistriated atys, is a species of small tropical sea snail, a bubble snail, a marine opisthobranch gastropod mollusk in the family Haminoeidae, the haminoea bubble snails.

== Distribution ==
This marine species occurs in the tropical Indo-West Pacific: off Madagascar, Hawaii, French Polynesia; Taiwan and Australia (Queensland, Western Australia)

== Description ==
The length of the shell of this species attains 6 mm.

(Original description in Latin) The shell is thin, pellucid, and has a whitish, slightly bluish tint. It is spirally belted with white, thread-like striae. While the apex is narrowed and slightly umbilicated, the middle part of the shell is distinctly inflated. The columella remains short and relatively straight, and it is truncated at the lower end.
