= S. ehrenbergi =

S. ehrenbergi may refer to:

- Spalax ehrenbergi, a blind mole-rat
- Sporisorium ehrenbergi, a plant pathogen

== See also ==
- S. ehrenbergii (disambiguation)
