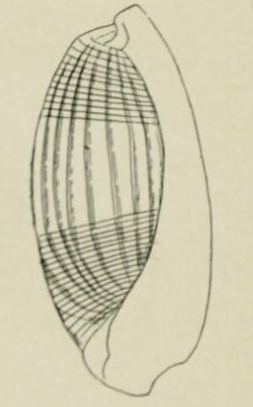
- Drawing of a shell of Atys costulosus (holotype)

Scientific classification
- Kingdom: Animalia
- Phylum: Mollusca
- Class: Gastropoda
- Order: Cephalaspidea
- Family: Haminoeidae
- Genus: Atys
- Species: A. costulosus

Binomial name
- Atys costulosus Pease, 1869

Synonyms
- Atys costulosa Pease, 1869 (incorrect gender of species epithet)

= Atys costulosus =

Species of gastropod

Atys costulosus is a species of small tropical sea snail, a bubble snail, a marine opisthobranch gastropod mollusk in the family Haminoeidae, the haminoea bubble snails.

== Description ==
The length of the shell attains 5½ mm, its diameter 2½ mm.

(Original description in Latin) The shell is elongate, subcylindrical, and narrowest posteriorly. It is white and umbilicate. The surface is longitudinally ribbed and is crossed at either end by elevated striae, which become more remote towards the middle of the shell and gradually vanish. The outer lip is posteriorly strongly twisted and produced. The columella is everted at the base, flattened, and appressed, while the aperture remains narrow.

== Distribution ==
This marine species occurs off Hawaii.
