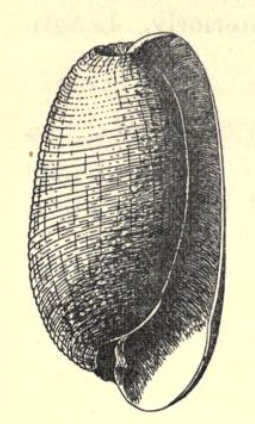
- Drawing of a shell of Atys dactylus (holotype)

Scientific classification
- Kingdom: Animalia
- Phylum: Mollusca
- Class: Gastropoda
- Order: Cephalaspidea
- Family: Haminoeidae
- Genus: Atys
- Species: A. dactylus

Binomial name
- Atys dactylus Hedley, 1899

= Atys dactylus =

Species of gastropod

Atys dactylus is a species of small tropical sea snail, a bubble snail, a marine opisthobranch gastropod mollusk in the family Haminoeidae, the haminoea bubble snails.

This is a taxon inquirendum.

== Description ==
The length of the shell attains 4½ mm, its diameter 2½ mm.

(Original description) The shell is date-shaped and is truncated both above and below. It is minutely perforate at the apex and deeply, narrowly umbilicate below. The colour is a glossy white. Regarding the sculpture, sixty to seventy irregularly waved, narrow, and shallow grooves girdle the shell. Between these grooves lie smooth, flat-topped lyrae that are two or three times the breadth of the grooves. These features are crossed at irregular intervals by both fine and coarse growth lines.

The aperture is vertical and stands longer than the shell itself; it is narrowly arched, dilated above and below, and appears rather effuse anteriorly. Above, the lip rises from the centre of the apical crater and, by folding back, almost covers the perforation. While the outer lip is straight and simple, the columella is broadly reflexed, emarginate without, and tuberculate within. Finally, a short tongue of callus extends a little distance upwards along the body whorl.

== Distribution ==
This marine species occurs off Funafuti.
