= Atys miranda =

Scientific classification
- Kingdom: Animalia
- Phylum: Mollusca
- Class: Gastropoda
- Order: Cephalaspidea
- Family: Haminoeidae
- Genus: Atys
- Species: A. miranda

Binomial name
- Atys miranda E. A. Smith, 1872

Species of gastropod

Atys miranda is a species of small tropical sea snail, a bubble snail, a marine opisthobranch gastropod mollusk in the family Haminoeidae, the haminoea bubble snails.

This is a taxon inquirendum.

== Description ==
The length of the shell attains 10 mm, its diameter 4 mm.

(Original description in Latin) The shell is elongately ovate and pellucid, being finely striated in a transverse direction and marked by irregular lines of growth. The vertex is depressed and is perforated at the center, from which point the lip rises. The aperture is extremely narrow at the upper part and is produced slightly above the vertex; toward the base, it becomes gradually dilated and effuse. The columella is very short and arched, and it is abruptly truncated in the same manner as is seen in the genus Achatina.

== Distribution ==
This marine species occurs in the Gulf of Suez.
