= Atys sandersoni =

Scientific classification
- Kingdom: Animalia
- Phylum: Mollusca
- Class: Gastropoda
- Order: Cephalaspidea
- Family: Haminoeidae
- Genus: Atys
- Species: A. sandersoni

Binomial name
- Atys sandersoni Dall, 1881

Species of gastropod

Atys sandersoni, common name the Sanderson's paper-bubble, is a species of small tropical sea snail, a bubble snail, a marine opisthobranch gastropod mollusk in the family Haminoeidae, the haminoea bubble snails.

== Description ==
The length of the shell attains 11 mm, its diameter 5.5 mm.

(Original description) The shell is small, thin, fragile, and polished, displaying a translucent white color. The aperture is notably longer than the axis of the shell. The overall form is slender and is shaped like an elongated oval, with the posterior fourth part being slightly beveled off.

The transverse sculpture consists solely of delicate, evanescent lines of growth, which are sometimes lost in the general polish of the surface. The spiral sculpture is composed of about a dozen incised lines near either extremity. These lines become more crowded toward the tips and are obsolete toward the middle of the shell; they reticulate the lines of growth when the latter are present. This sculpture is delicate and extremely fine, but it is not puncticulate.

The posterior apex features a rather deep, funiculate pit. Out of the center of this pit rises the margin of the aperture, which is slightly reflected here. It extends behind the summit of the body and suddenly curves forward, creating a very narrow aperture. This opening is produced into a rounded point in front, then it is sharply recurved and reflected to a point where the reflected part merges into the thin callus on the body within the aperture. The anterior reflection is sometimes closely appressed and sometimes loose, leaving a small chink behind it, but there is no anterior pit.

The shell appears more slender toward the front than behind, and the bevelling is more marked in some specimens than in others.

== Distribution ==
This marine species occurs in the Caribbean Sea; in the Atlantic Ocean off North Carolina, USA (South of Cape Lookout: 30 m) and off Brazil.
