= Atys hyalinus =

Scientific classification
- Kingdom: Animalia
- Phylum: Mollusca
- Class: Gastropoda
- Order: Cephalaspidea
- Family: Haminoeidae
- Genus: Atys
- Species: A. hyalinus

Binomial name
- Atys hyalinus R. B. Watson, 1883

Synonyms
- Atys darnleyensis Brazier, 1877 (possible senior synonym); Atys hyalina R. B. Watson, 1883 (wrong grammatical agreement in original publication)

Species of gastropod

Atys hyalinus is a species of small tropical sea snail, a bubble snail, a marine opisthobranch gastropod mollusk in the family Haminoeidae, the haminoea bubble snails.

== Description ==
The length of the shell attains 12 mm.

(Original description) The shell is oval and subgibbous, being somewhat abruptly contracted, slightly constricted, and truncated at the top. It is thin, hyaline, and umbilicated, featuring a relatively large, curved mouth.

Regarding the sculpture, the longitudinal elements consist of numerous slight, equal, hair-like lines of growth. As for the spirals, the entire surface—with the exception of a narrow, smooth median band—is scratched with fine, regular, square-cut, and widely parted furrows. These furrows are arranged more regularly above than below, where the interstices become wider and less uniform. Toward both ends of the shell, these furrows tend to become crowded; they extend to the very edge of the funnel-shaped apical depression, though the depression itself remains smooth, except for the twisted edge of the outer lip. This lip is reverted at the generic sinus, albeit somewhat narrowly. In front, the furrows score one side of the umbilicus but do not quite reach the edge of the pillar.

The colour ranges from hyaline to translucent.

The aperture is long and curved; it remains rather narrow and is not significantly enlarged in front. The outer lip is convex and produced posteriorly. At the generic twisted sinus, which is rather small, the lip rises and advances to form a sharp curve. From this point, the lip runs to the right—initially straight or faintly concave and slightly contracted—before transitioning into a very regular curve that is increasingly patulous toward the base. The top is very obliquely truncate with a bluntish edge and a small, funnel-shaped depression that leads into the interior through the generic sinus. Concerning the inner lip, there is no glaze on the body whorl, the curve of which is slightly gibbous above. The columellar-edge is narrow, reverted, bluntly toothed, and twisted. At the base, this edge is so strongly twisted that it is separated from the body, leaving a very narrow but deep fissure. This fissure communicates with the deep umbilicus, which lies behind and is partly covered by the expanded, projecting columellar-edge.

== Distribution ==
This marine species occurs off Cape York, Northern Australia; also off India, Singapore, Indonesia and Fiji.
