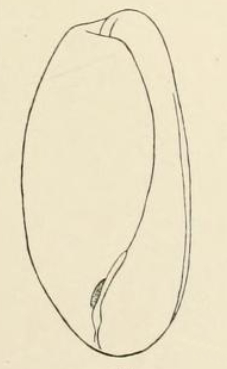
- Original drawing of a shell of Atys sharpi

Scientific classification
- Kingdom: Animalia
- Phylum: Mollusca
- Class: Gastropoda
- Order: Cephalaspidea
- Family: Haminoeidae
- Genus: Atys
- Species: A. sharpi

Binomial name
- Atys sharpi Vanatta, 1901

= Atys sharpi =

Species of gastropod

Atys sharpi is a species of small tropical sea snail, a bubble snail, a marine opisthobranch gastropod mollusk in the family Haminoeidae, the haminoea bubble snails.

== Distribution ==
This marine species occurs in the Gulf of Mexico and in the Caribbean Sea: St. Martin, West Indies

== Description ==
The length of the shell of this species attains 7.84 mm, its diameter 3.8 mm.

(Original description) The shell is small, subcylindrical, and solid, featuring a porcellanous and glossy surface. It appears in a translucent bluish-white hue and is decorated with very fine spiral striae, which are most prominent at the top and the bottom of the structure.

At the apex, there is an extremely small perforation. The base is umbilicate, leading to an aperture that is narrow at the top but becomes broader toward the bottom. The lip rises from the right side of the apical perforation and follows a relatively even arc above, lacking the twist that is commonly found in this genus. As it continues, the outer lip descends in a gentle curve, while the basal lip remains arcuate. Finally, the columella is concave and exhibits a slight, subtle twist.

This species is easily recognized by the lack of a twist on the evenly curved upper part of the lip.
