= A. ehrenbergi =

A. ehrenbergi may refer to:

- Anemeca ehrenbergi, a Mexican butterfly
- Atys ehrenbergi, a sea snail

== See also ==
- A. ehrenbergii (disambiguation)
