= Atys riiseanus =

Scientific classification
- Kingdom: Animalia
- Phylum: Mollusca
- Class: Gastropoda
- Order: Cephalaspidea
- Family: Haminoeidae
- Genus: Atys
- Species: A. riiseanus

Binomial name
- Atys riiseanus Mörch, 1875

Synonyms
- Atys cylindrella Nowell-Usticke, 1971 junior subjective synonym

Species of gastropod

Atys riiseanus, also called Riise's paper bubble, is a species of small tropical sea snail, a bubble snail, a marine opisthobranch gastropod mollusk in the family Haminoeidae, the haminoea bubble snails. The snail was first documented by Mörch in volume 22 of the 1875 publication Malakozoologische Blätter.

== Distribution ==
This marine species occurs in the Gulf of Mexico, in the Caribbean Sea, and on the Atlantic coasts of Central America and northeastern South America. Countries where A. riiseanus has been documented include The Bahamas, The United States (Puerto Rico), Costa Rica, Panama, and Venezuela.

== Description ==
=== Exterior Appearance and Shell ===
A. riiseanus has a bilaterally symmetric shell. The length of the shell of this species attains 10.5 mm, its diameter 5 mm.

== Behavior ==
=== Habitat ===
A. riiseanus is a marine snail that resides in the benthic zone and lives in water 2-93 meters below the surface. It lives in sub-tropical waters.

=== Reproduction ===
This species is reproduces by sexual reproduction and, like many other members of the order Cephalospidea, is simultaneously hermaphroditic.

=== Locomotion ===
A. riiseanus moves by mucus mediated gliding. The snail alternates contracting and expanding the muscles of the foot, resulting in waves that propel the snail forwards.

=== Diet ===
A. riiseanus is a grazer. All members of the gastropod genus Atys are herbivores, feeding on marine vegetation.
