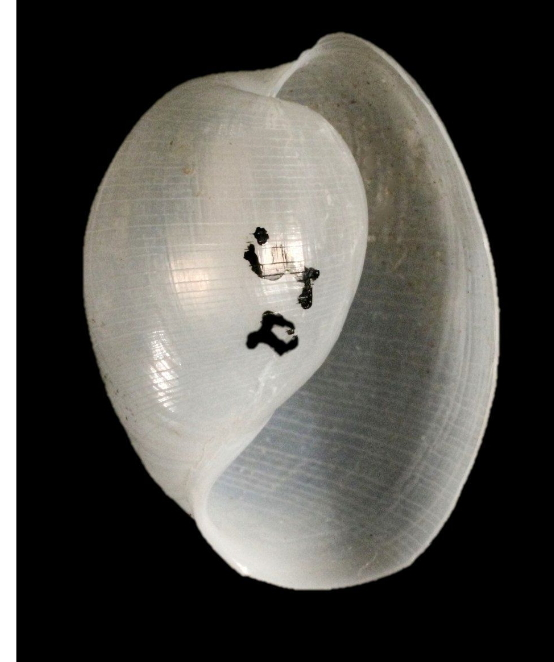
- Shell of Atys guildingi (specimen at Naturalis Biodiversity Center)

Scientific classification
- Kingdom: Animalia
- Phylum: Mollusca
- Class: Gastropoda
- Order: Cephalaspidea
- Family: Haminoeidae
- Genus: Atys
- Species: A. guildingi

Binomial name
- Atys guildingi G. B. Sowerby II, 1869

= Atys guildingi =

Species of gastropod

Atys guildingi, common name Guilding's atys, is a species of small tropical sea snail, a bubble snail, a marine opisthobranch gastropod mollusk in the family Haminoeidae, the haminoea bubble snails.

== Description ==
The length of the shell attains 12 mm.

(Original description) The shell is ovate, thin, and is a dull greyish-white in color. It is attenuated posteriorly and is spirally striated near the ends, while the surface is slightly wrinkled longitudinally. The body is ventricose below the centre and is slightly umbilicated at each end. The outer lip is elevated above the spire, appearing subacuminated and inflected, while the columella is thin and relatively straight.

This species is one of the very few in the genus Atys which presents the character of possessing longitudinal wrinkles or striae.

== Distribution ==
This marine species occurs off Florida, USA and in the Caribbean Sea off Puerto Rico and Guadeloupe; found at depths up to 25 m.
