= Atys liriope =

Scientific classification
- Kingdom: Animalia
- Phylum: Mollusca
- Class: Gastropoda
- Order: Cephalaspidea
- Family: Haminoeidae
- Genus: Atys
- Species: A. liriope

Binomial name
- Atys liriope Hertlein & A. M. Strong, 1951

Synonyms
- Atys (Aliculastrum) liriope Hertlein & A. M. Strong, 1951

Species of gastropod

Atys liriope is a species of small tropical sea snail, a bubble snail, a marine opisthobranch gastropod mollusk in the family Haminoeidae, the haminoea bubble snails.

== Description ==
The length of the shell attains 9.8 mm, its diameter is 3.6 mm.

== Distribution ==
This marine species occurs in the Gulf of California.
