= Atys submalleatus =

Scientific classification
- Kingdom: Animalia
- Phylum: Mollusca
- Class: Gastropoda
- Order: Cephalaspidea
- Family: Haminoeidae
- Genus: Atys
- Species: A. submalleatus

Binomial name
- Atys submalleatus E. A. Smith, 1904

Synonyms
- Atys submalleata E. A. Smith, 1904 (incorrect gender of species epithet)

Species of gastropod

Atys submalleatus is a species of small tropical sea snail, a bubble snail, a marine opisthobranch gastropod mollusk in the family Haminoeidae, the haminoea bubble snails.

== Distribution ==
This marine species occurs off the Andaman Islands, Bay of Bengal.

== Description ==
The length of the shell of this species attains 27 mm, its diameter 9 mm.

(Original description in Latin) The shell is thin, translucent, and elongated-ovate in shape. It is imperforate at both ends and is marked by fine lines of growth. The surface is lightly hammered with somewhat distant transverse lines and features delicate transverse striations at both extremities.

The outer lip is extremely thin and extends slightly above the spire. Toward the front, the aperture is slightly channeled. The columella is twisted, thickened, and reflected, appearing pressed closely against the body of the shell. Finally, the apex is characterized by a concave impression.
