= Atys blainvillianus =

Scientific classification
- Kingdom: Animalia
- Phylum: Mollusca
- Class: Gastropoda
- Order: Cephalaspidea
- Family: Haminoeidae
- Genus: Atys
- Species: A. blainvillianus

Binomial name
- Atys blainvillianus (Récluz, 1843)

Synonyms
- Bulla blainvilliana Récluz, 1843

Species of gastropod

Atys blainvillianus is a species of small tropical sea snail, a bubble snail, a marine opisthobranch gastropod mollusk in the family Haminoeidae, the haminoea bubble snails.

This is a nomen dubium.

== Description ==
The length of the shell attains 10.5 mm, its diameter 5.5 mm.

(Original description in Latin) The shell is oblong, sub-cylindrical, and umbilicated (having a small navel-like pit). It is shiny and milk-white in color, slightly convex in the middle, and very smooth, except at the extremities which are striated. These marginal striae are deeper at the edges and gradually become smoother toward the center. The aperture is oblong and becomes wider at the base. The columella is bluntly one-toothed at the lower part.

The summit is umbilicated, and this umbilicus, which is one millimeter wide, is rounded on the inside. The umbilicated side is slightly more tapered than the base of the shell. It is always a beautiful white and not an orange-red.

== Distribution ==
This species occurs in the Mediterranean Sea off Spain, France, Tunisia and Turkey.
