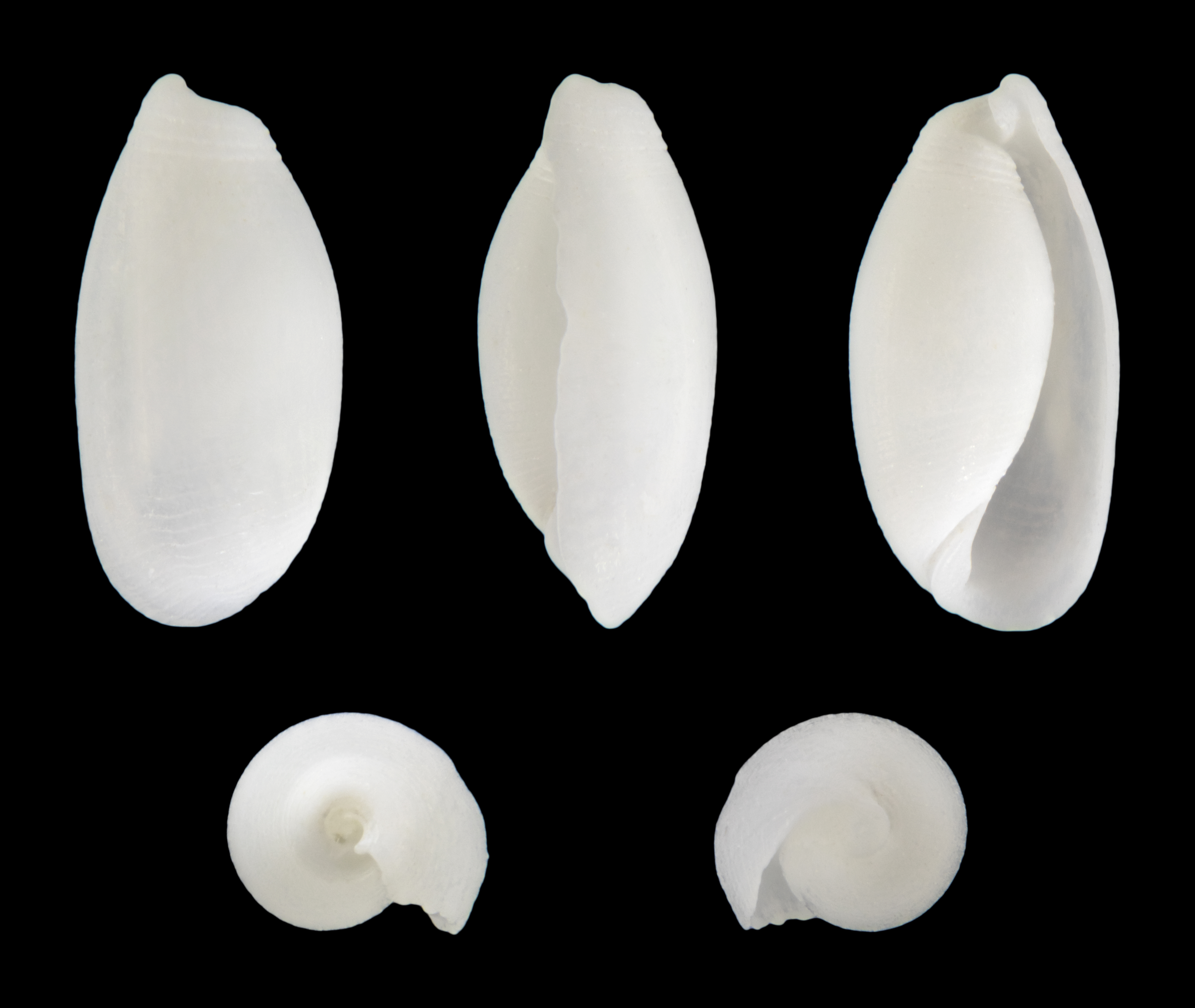
- Shell of Atys bicolor

Scientific classification
- Kingdom: Animalia
- Phylum: Mollusca
- Class: Gastropoda
- Order: Cephalaspidea
- Family: Haminoeidae
- Genus: Atys
- Species: A. bicolor

Binomial name
- Atys bicolor Bozzetti, 2009

= Atys bicolor =

Species of gastropod

Atys bicolor is a species of small tropical sea snail, a bubble snail, a marine opisthobranch gastropod mollusk in the family Haminoeidae, the haminoea bubble snails.

== Distribution ==
This marine species occurs off Madagascar.
