= Atys cheverti =

Scientific classification
- Kingdom: Animalia
- Phylum: Mollusca
- Class: Gastropoda
- Order: Cephalaspidea
- Family: Haminoeidae
- Genus: Atys
- Species: A. cheverti

Binomial name
- Atys cheverti Brazier, 1877

Species of gastropod

Atys cheverti is a species of small tropical sea snail, a bubble snail, a marine opisthobranch gastropod mollusk in the family Haminoeidae, the haminoea bubble snails.

== Description ==
The shell is oval in shape and extremely delicate in structure. It is whitish-gray in color, translucent, and somewhat expanded, being slightly produced at both ends. Both the anterior and posterior parts are spirally striated, with fine, shallowly grooved striae that are clear and sharply defined, about fourteen on each side. The central surface is very smooth. The apex bears a single fold. The outer lip is slightly expanded and extremely thin. The aperture is narrow and crescent-shaped, and the columella is faintly marked by a single fold.

== Distribution ==
This marine species is endemic to Australia and occurs in the Torres Strait and off Queensland.
