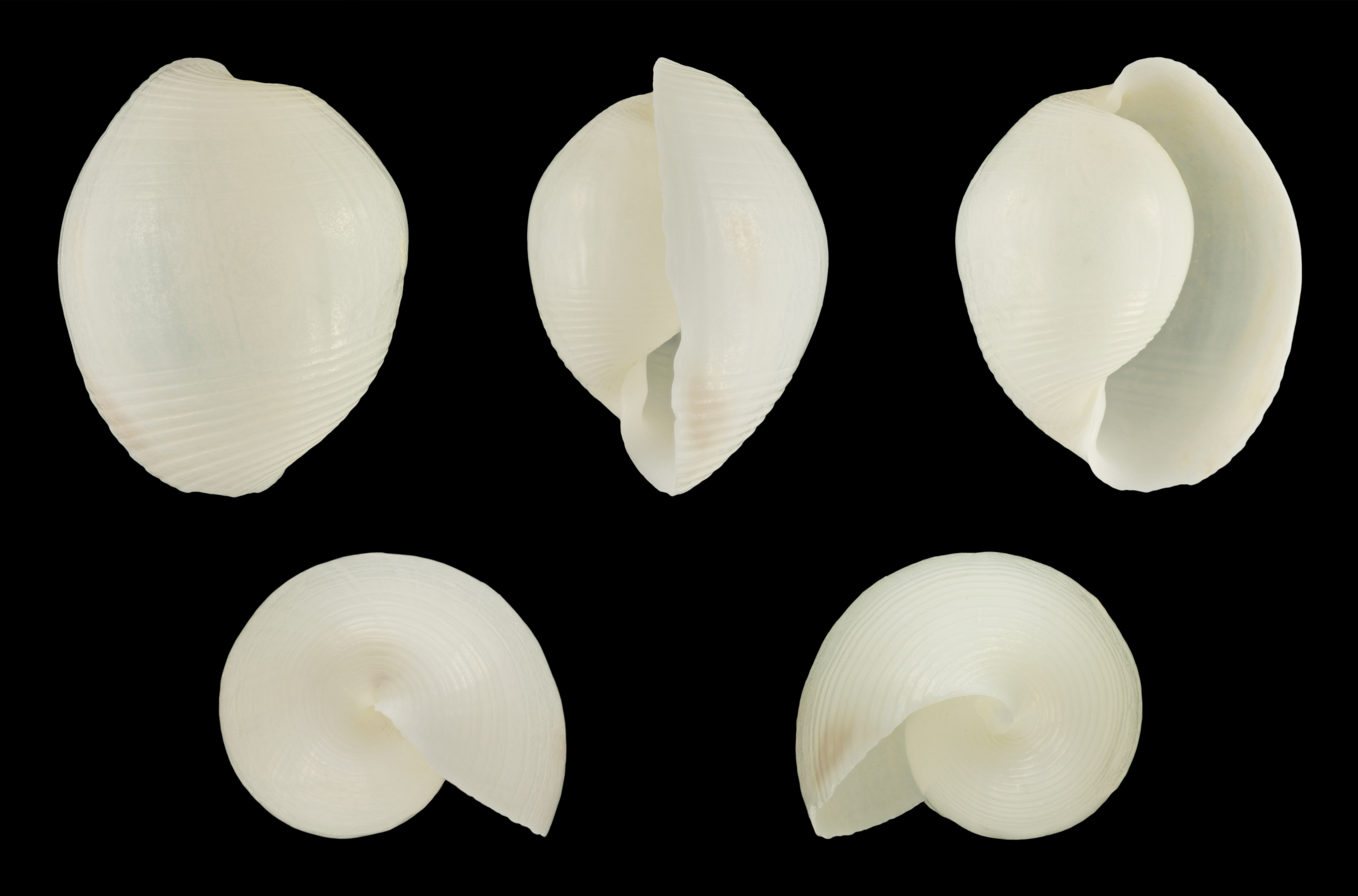
- Five views of a shell of Atys naucum

Scientific classification
- Kingdom: Animalia
- Phylum: Mollusca
- Class: Gastropoda
- Order: Cephalaspidea
- Family: Haminoeidae
- Genus: Atys
- Species: A. naucum

Binomial name
- Atys naucum Linnaeus, 1758

Synonyms
- Atys cymbulus Montfort, 1810 (unnecessary substitute name for Bulla naucum Linnaeus); Atys ferruginosa (A. Adams, 1850); Atys freyi Brancsik, 1891; Bulla ferruginosa A. Adams, 1850; Bulla naucum Linnaeus, 1758; Haminoea ferruginosa (A. Adams, 1850); Naucum striatulum Schumacher, 1817 (unnecessary substitute name for Bulla naucum Linnaeus)

= Atys naucum =

Species of gastropod

Atys naucum, common names the "white nut sheath bubble'" and the "Pacific nut sheath bubble", is a species of small tropical sea snail, a bubble snail, a marine opisthobranch gastropod mollusk in the family Haminoeidae, the haminoea bubble snails.

== Distribution ==
The distribution of this species occurs in the Indo-Pacific, off Madagascar, the Red Sea, and also in Australia (Queensland, Western Australia). It is a common species.

Fossils of this species have been found in Quaternary strata of Yemen and in Miocene strata of Indonesia.

== Description ==
The length of the shell of this species is 22–50 mm. The shell is composed almost entirely of aragonite, a mineral more soluble than calcite. This makes Atys naucum an "indicator species" for ocean acidification as their thin, inflated shells show degradate faster than more robust gastropods.

In life the shell is light brown and inflated. When the animal dies the periostracum which covers the shell dries out and is lost. Juveniles have brown longitudinal wavy lines on the shell, which gradually disappear as the shell thickens and the periostracum matures. This periostracum is often a rusty or yellowish-brown.

This snail is specifically a "sand-sifting" herbivore. However the species also possesses three highly developed calcareous gizzard plates with very fine ridges that are occupied by tiny rods (these are characteristic for this species). These plates are used to crush the silica shells of diatoms and the tough cellulose of filamentous algae.

(Description by G.B. Sowerby II) The shell is inflated, ovate, and subsolid in structure. It is covered with a thin epidermis and remains rather smooth, though it is spirally striate and sulcated. The sulci are subdistant and become subobliterated toward the middle of the body whorl. The columella is tortuous, obliquely truncated, and subumbilicated, while the apex is also subumbilicated. The aperture is large, and the outer lip is elevated above the vertex and is cuneate in shape.

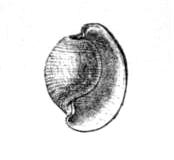
Drawing of a shell of Atys naucum

== Circadian activity ==
During the day, Atys naucum relies on crypsis and is almost entirely fossorial. It uses its large cephalic shield as a biological spade to stay 1–5 cm below the sediment surface during daylight hours to avoid predators, such as rays and crushing crabs. It is helped in this defensive response by the darkly mottled or dull grey/brown coloration of its shell.

The snails emerge only after sunset for a period known as "night cruising." Most "live" sightings by divers occur during these first few hours of darkness, when the animals traverse the surface of the sand to locate and feed upon fresh algal mats.
