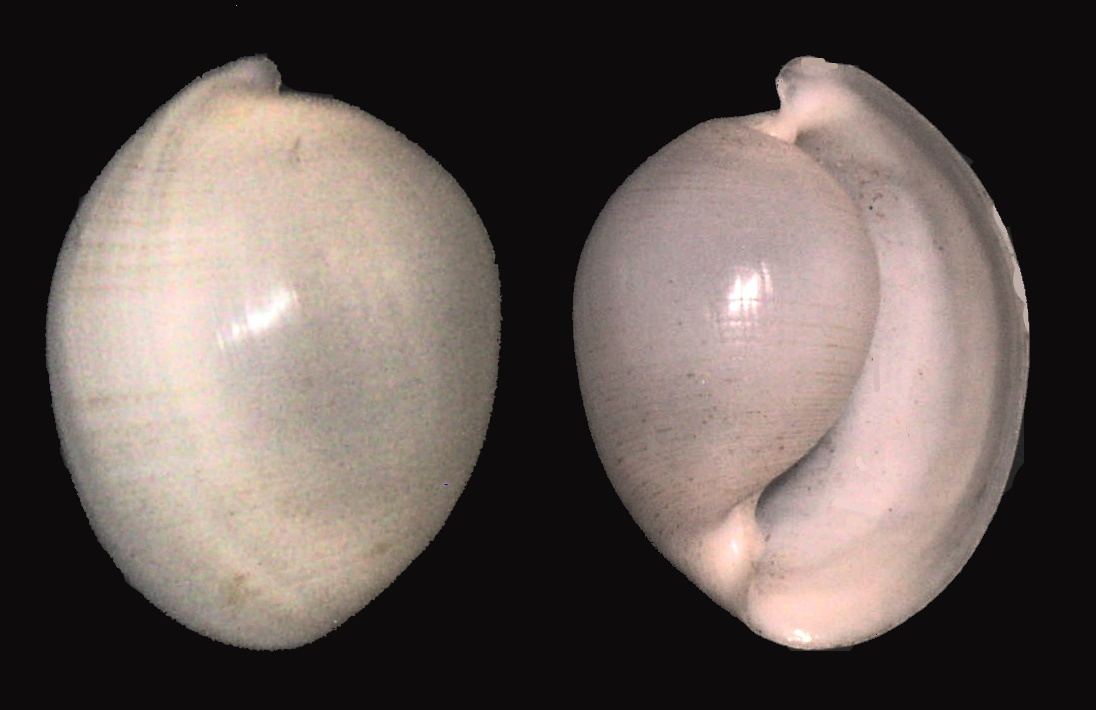
- Two views of a shell of Atys naucum

Scientific classification
- Kingdom: Animalia
- Phylum: Mollusca
- Class: Gastropoda
- Order: Cephalaspidea
- Family: Haminoeidae
- Genus: Atys (Montfort, 1810)

Type species
- Atys cymbulus Montfort, 1810

Species
- See text

Synonyms
- Atys (Atys) Monfort, 1810; Bulla (Atys) Montfort, 1810; Naucum Schumacher, 1817 junior objective synonym

= Atys (gastropod) =

Genus of gastropods

Atys is a genus of very small to medium-sized sea snails, marine opisthobranch gastropod mollusks in the family Haminoeidae.

All the species within the genus Atys are herbivores. They occur in tropical and warm oceans and seas. They are cephalaspideans, part of the suborder of headshield slugs and bubble snails.

The genus was named after Atys, a king of Alba Longa, who was mentioned in ancient Greek texts.

== Description ==
(Description by G.B. Sowerby II) The shell is concealed beneath the mantle of the animal. It is ovate or cylindrical in shape, generally white in color, and notably solid. The surface is transversely striated both above and below the middle section, while the spire remains entirely concealed. The columella is tortuous, and the outer lip is elevated above the spire at its end; additionally, the lip is more or less contracted above the middle of the shell.

These snails have a shell which is very lightweight and translucent, with a sunken spire. The shape of the shell in some species resembles a bubble, and because of this, species in this genus are commonly known as Atys bubble shells or Atys bubble snails. (Several other shelled families within the Cephalaspidea are even more commonly known as "bubble shells" or "bubble snails", for example, the Bullidae.)

The anatomy of the soft parts of most species within this genus has not been studied, but it seems that some of the species in this genus can not reliably be discriminated on the basis of shell characters alone. Unfortunately however, a considerable number of the species were originally named from empty shells, and as a result, their exact identity may be problematic.

== Species ==
Species within the genus Atys include:

- Atys angustatus Smith, 1972
- † Atys beberkiriana Martin, 1906
- Atys bicolor Bozzetti, 2009
- Atys biforatus Thiele, 1925
- Atys blainvillianus (Récluz, 1843) (nomen dubium - probably a synonym of Atys jeffreysi)
- Atys caribaeus d'Orbigny, 1841 Also known as Caribbean glassy-bubble, Sharp’s paper-bubble
- Atys chelidon Melvill, 1912
- Atys cheverti Brazier, 1879
- Atys convexa Preston, 1908 (taxon inquirendum)
- Atys costulosus Pease, 1869
- Atys crassilabris Thiele, 1925
- Atys dactylus Hedley, 1899 (taxon inquirendum)
- Atys densus Brazier, 1877
- † Atys duvergieri (Peyrot, 1932)
- Atys ehrenbergi A. Issel, 1869 (possibly = Atys naucum)
- † Atys extumidus Pacaud, 2024
- Atys guildingi G.B. Sowerby II, 1869 Guildin’s atys
- Atys hyalinus Watson, 1883
- † Atys kekele Pilsbry, 1920: taxon inquirendum
- Atys kuhnsi Pilsbry, 1917
- Atys liriope Hertlein & Strong, 1951
- † Atys maorinus Marwick, 1931
- Atys miranda Smith, 1872 (taxon inquirendum)
- Atys naucum Linnaeus, 1758 white nut sheath bubble, Pacific nut sheath bubble
- Atys neglectus Preston, 1908
- Atys nonscriptus clean-slate glassy-bubble
- Atys obscuratus Dall, 1896 obscure glassy-bubble
- † Atys okinawa MacNeil, 1961
- Atys pacei Preston, 1908 (taxon inquirendum)
- Atys riiseanus Mörch, 1875
- Atys sandersoni Dall, 1881
- Atys semistriatus Pease, 1860 variably banded atys, variable banded bubble
- Atys sharpi Vanatta, 1901
- Atys submalleatus Smith, 1904
- Atys virginalis Thiele, 1925
- Atys vixumbilicata Preston, 1908 (taxon inquirendum)
- Atys xarifae Marcus, 1959

== Synonyms ==
- Atys alayoi Espinosa, Fernandez-Garcès & Ortea, 2004: synonym of Colinatys alayoi (Espinosa & Ortea, 2004) (superseded combination)
- Atys bathymophila Dall, 1881: synonym of Sabatia bathymophila (Dall, 1881) (superseded combination)
- † Atys brocchii Michelotti, 1847: synonym of † Cylichna brocchii (Michelotti, 1847) (superseded combination)
  - Distribution : Mediterranean, Turkey
- Atys canariensis E. A. Smith, 1872: synonym of Weinkauffia turgidula (Forbes, 1844) (junior subjective synonym)
- Atys castus Carpenter, 1864 clean glassy-bubble: synonym of Aliculastrum exaratum(P. P. Carpenter, 1857)
  - Distribution : Baja California, Mexico
  - Length : 10 mm
- Atys chimera Baker & Hanna, 1927: synonym of Aliculastrum exaratum (P. P. Carpenter, 1857)
  - Distribution : Baja California, Mexico
  - Length : 7 mm
- Atys constrictus Habe, 1952: synonym of Limulatys constrictus Habe, 1952
- Atys cornuta Pilsbry, 1917: synonym of Limulatys debilis (Pease, 1860): synonym of Aliculastrum debile (Pease, 1860)
- Atys costulosa Pease, 1869 : synonym of Atys costulosus Pease, 1869 (incorrect gender of species epithet)
- Atys curta A. Adams, 1850 striate bubble: synonym of Liloa mongii (Audouin, 1826)
- Atys cylindrae (Helbling, 1779): synonym of Aliculastrum cylindricum (Helbling, 1779) (misspelling)
- Atys cylindrella Nowell-Usticke, 1971: synonym of Atys riiseanus Mörch, 1875 (junior subjective synonym)
- Atys cylindricus (Helbling, 1779): synonym of Aliculastrum cylindricum (Helbling, 1779)
- Atys cylindricum (Helbling, 1779): synonym of Aliculastrum cylindricum (Helbling, 1779)
- Atys darnleyensis Brazier, 1879: synonym of Atys hyalinus R. B. Watson, 1883 (possible senior synonym)
- Atys debilis Pease, 1871: synonym of Aliculastrum debile (Pease, 1860) (original combination)
  - Distribution : Hawaii
  - Length : 10 mm
  - Description : on sandy bottoms where they burrow through the sand with their flattened headshield for food like small crustaceans.
- Atys densa Brazier, 1877: synonym of Atys densus Brazier, 1877 (incorrect gender of species epithet)
- Atys dubiosa Brazier, 1879: synonym of Osorattis dubiosa (Brazier, 1877) (superseded combination)
- Atys ferruginosa (A. Adams, 1850): synonym of Atys naucum (Linnaeus, 1758)
- Atys flavovirens Melvill & Standen, 1903: synonym of Vellicolla flavovirens (Melvill & Standen, 1903) (superseded combination)
- Atys fukuokaensis Habe, 1852: synonym of Mimatys fukuokaensis Habe, 1952
  - Distribution: Japan
- Atys jeffreysi Weinkauff, 1868: synonym of Roxaniella jeffreysi (Weinkauff, 1866)
  - Distribution : Canary Islands, Madeira, Azores, Mediterranean
- Atys lithiensis Sturany, 1903: synonym of Roxania lithensis (Sturany, 1903) (original combination)
- Atys macandrewii E. A. Smith, 1872: synonym of Weinkauffia macandrewii (E. A. Smith, 1872)
  - Distribution : Caribbean, Brazil, Eastern Atlantic Ocean, Azores, Canaries, Cape Verde Islands
  - Length : 7.3 mm
  - Description : found at depths of up to 75 m
- Atys multistriata Schepman, 1913: synonym of Roxaniella multistriata (Schepman, 1913) (wrong grammatical agreement of species epithet)
  - Distribution : Micronesia, Philippines
  - Length : 12 mm
  - Description : short headshield, broadened anteriorly, with internal black eyes. Short posterior lobes. Triangulate parapodia cover the anterior of the shell; short, rounded tail; The translucent Hancock’s organs appear as a thin low profile ridge. Translucent white animal with brown spots and clusters of opaque white dots; thin, elongate, ovoid shell; inner margin of the outer lip extends above the apex; slightly curved columella; deep umbilicus behind the fold
- Atys muscaria Gould, 1859: synonym of Vellicolla muscaria (A. A. Gould, 1859) (superseded combination)
- Atys okamotoi Habe, 1952: synonym of Vellicolla okamotoi (Habe, 1952)
- Atys palmarum Hedley, 1912: synonym of Micratys ovum Habe, 1952 (doubtful synonym)
- Atys pittmani Too, Carlson, Hoff & Malaquias, 2014: synonym of Roxaniella pittmani (Too, Carlson, Hoff & Malaquias, 2014) (original combination) Roxaniella pittmani (Too, Carlson, Hoff & Malaquias, 2014) (original combination)
- Atys porcellana Gould, 1859: synonym of Liloa porcellana (A. A. Gould, 1859) (superseded combination)
- Atys pransa Hedley, 1904: synonym of Spissitydeus pransa (Hedley, 1904) (superseded combination)
- Atys pulchra Brazier, 1879: synonym of Mnestia pulchra (Brazier, 1877) (original combination)
- Atys reliqua Iredale, 1936: synonym of Weinkauffia reliqua (Iredale, 1936)
- Atys scrobiculata A. Adams, 1862: synonym of Limulatys scrobiculatus (A. Adams, 1862) (superseded combination)
- Atys semistriata Pease, 1860: synonym of Atys semistriatus Pease, 1860 (incorrect grammatical agreement of specific epithet)
- Atys supracancellata Schepman, 1913: synonym of Sabatia supracancellata (Schepman, 1913)
- Atys tortuosus A. Adams, 1850: synonym of Vellicolla tortuosa (A. Adams, 1850)
- Atys tremens (Iredale, 1936): synonym of Weinkauffia tremens (Iredale, 1936)
- Atys turgidula (Forbes, 1844) : synonym of Weinkauffia turgidula (Forbes, 1844) (superseded combination)
- † Atys turgidula (F. Sandberger, 1859): synonym of † Atys extumidus Pacaud, 2024 (junior homonym)
- Atys ukulele Too, Carlson, Hoff & Malaquias, 2014: synonym of Weinkauffia ukulele (Too, Carlson, Hoff & Malaquias, 2014) (original combination)
- Atys volvulina A. Adams, 1862: synonym of Aliculastrum volvulina (A. Adams, 1862) (superseded combination)
