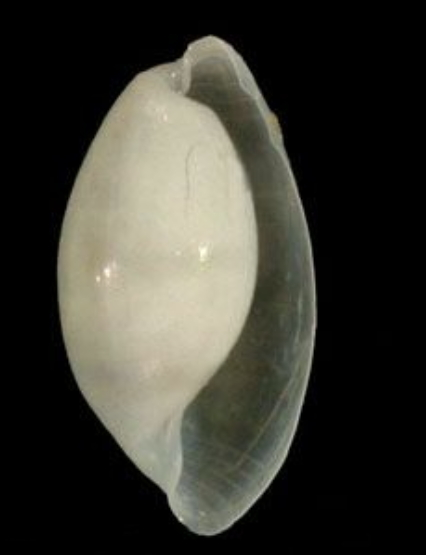
- Shell of Atys caribaeus (specimen at the Natural History Museum Rotterdam)

Scientific classification
- Kingdom: Animalia
- Phylum: Mollusca
- Class: Gastropoda
- Order: Cephalaspidea
- Family: Haminoeidae
- Genus: Atys
- Species: A. caribaeus

Binomial name
- Atys caribaeus (A. d'Orbigny, 1841)

Synonyms
- Bulla (Atys) speciosa A. Adams, 1850; Bulla caribaea A. d'Orbigny, 1841; Bulla speciosa A. Adams, 1850

= Atys caribaeus =

Species of gastropod

Atys caribaeus, common names the Caribbean glassy-bubble, Sharp's paper-bubble, is a species of small tropical sea snail, a bubble snail, a marine opisthobranch gastropod mollusk in the family Haminoeidae, the haminoea bubble snails.

== Description ==
The length of the shell attains 11 mm.

(Original description in French) The shell is oval, oblong, and thin, with a fragile and smooth texture that tapers at both ends. It is adorned with a few transverse striae. The spire is totally involute, marked by a slight umbilical depression that is not perforated. The aperture is narrow and barely arched, widening slightly toward the front; the columella is somewhat separated by an umbilical depression.

Its color is a uniform white.

== Distribution ==
This species occurs off Florida, in the Caribbean Sea and off Brazil, Western Atlantic Ocean; found at depths up to 183 m.
