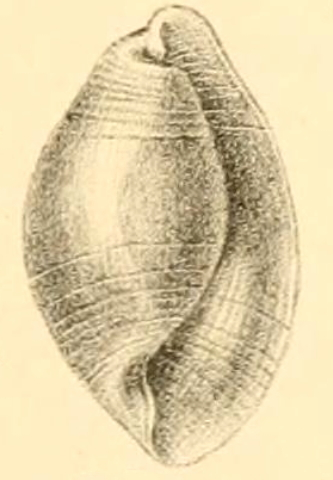
- Drawing of a shell of Atys chelidon (holotype)

Scientific classification
- Kingdom: Animalia
- Phylum: Mollusca
- Class: Gastropoda
- Order: Cephalaspidea
- Family: Haminoeidae
- Genus: Atys
- Species: A. chelidon

Binomial name
- Atys chelidon Melvill, 1912

= Atys chelidon =

Species of gastropod

Atys chelidon is a species of small tropical sea snail, a bubble snail, a marine opisthobranch gastropod mollusk in the family Haminoeidae, the haminoea bubble snails.

== Description ==
The length of the shell attains 12.5 mm, its diameter 6.5 mm.

(Original description in Latin) The shell is oval, extremely delicate, whitish-gray, translucent, and spreading, slightly produced at both ends. It is spirally striated at the front and the rear alike, with fine grooved striae that are clear and sharply defined, about fourteen on each side. The central surface is very smooth. The apex bears a single fold. The outer lip is slightly expanded and extremely thin. The aperture is narrow and crescent-shaped, and the columella is obscurely single-folded.

== Distribution ==
This marine species occurs in the Strait of Hormuz.
