= Weinkauffia =

Scientific classification
- Kingdom: Animalia
- Phylum: Mollusca
- Class: Gastropoda
- Order: Cephalaspidea
- Family: Haminoeidae
- Genus: Weinkauffia; Weinkauff, 1873

Genus of sea snails

Weinkauffia is a genus of gastropods belonging to the family Haminoeidae.

The genus has almost cosmopolitan distribution.

Species:

- Weinkauffia lacrimula (Laws, 1939)
- Weinkauffia macandrewii (E.A.Smith, 1872)
- Weinkauffia perforata (Thiele, 1925)
- Weinkauffia reliqua (Iredale, 1936)
- Weinkauffia tremens (Iredale, 1936)
- Weinkauffia turgidula (Forbes, 1844)
- Weinkauffia ukulele (Too, Carlson, Hoff & Malaquias, 2014)
