= S. ehrenbergii =

S. ehrenbergii may refer to:

- Sansevieria ehrenbergii, a northeastern African plant
- Saropogon ehrenbergii, a robber fly
- Solanum ehrenbergii, a tuberous plant
- Stachys ehrenbergii, a lamb's ear

== See also ==
- S. ehrenbergi (disambiguation)
