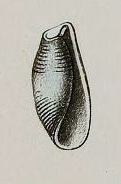
- Drawing of a shell of Aliculastrum debile

Scientific classification
- Kingdom: Animalia
- Phylum: Mollusca
- Class: Gastropoda
- Order: Cephalaspidea
- Family: Haminoeidae
- Genus: Aliculastrum
- Species: A. debile

Binomial name
- Aliculastrum debile (Pease, 1860)
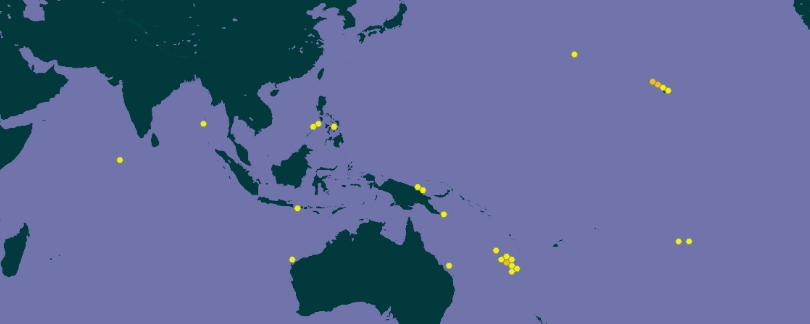

Synonyms
- Atys cornuta Pilsbry, 1917; Atys debilis Pease, 1860 (original combination); Limulatys debilis (Pease, 1860) ·

= Aliculastrum debile =

Species of gastropod

Aliculastrum debile is a species of gastropods belonging to the family Haminoeidae.

== Description ==
The length of the shell attains 11 mm.

(Original description) The shell is cylindrically ovate and elongated, tapering towards the posterior end. It is translucent, fragile, and white in color. The outer lip is extended and twisted towards the posterior. The apex is umbilicated, with a striated or grooved umbilicus that is finely marked by transverse striations. Both ends of the shell display raised transverse lines, and the columella features a distinct fold.

== Distribution ==
The marine species has a wide distribution and is found in the Pacific Ocean (Hawaii, Cook Islands); also off Indonesia, Maldives, the Philippines, Papua New Guinea, New Caledonia, Australia.
