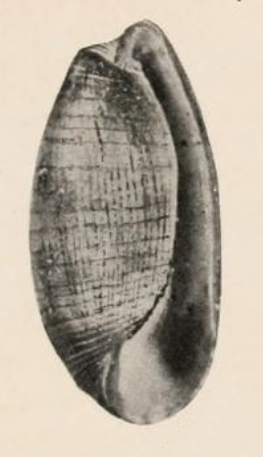
- Shell of Aliculastrum exaratum

Scientific classification
- Kingdom: Animalia
- Phylum: Mollusca
- Class: Gastropoda
- Order: Cephalaspidea
- Family: Haminoeidae
- Genus: Aliculastrum
- Species: A. exaratum

Binomial name
- Aliculastrum exaratum (P. P. Carpenter, 1857)
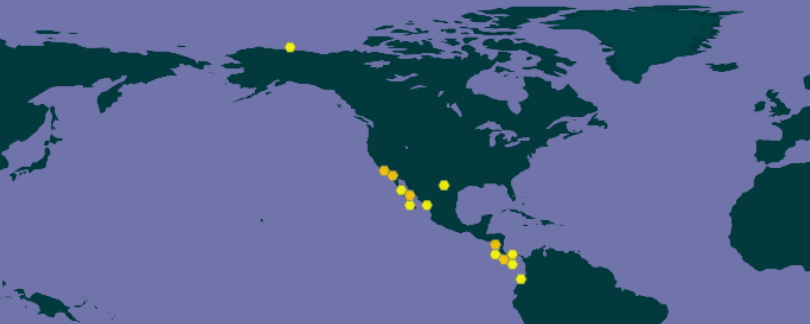

Synonyms
- Atys casta P. P. Carpenter, 1864 (incorrect gender ending); Atys castus P. P. Carpenter, 1864 · unaccepted; Atys chimera F. Baker & G. D. Hanna, 1927; Atys exaratus (P. P. Carpenter, 1857); Bulla exarata P. P. Carpenter, 1857 (original combination); Cylichna stephensae A. M. Strong & Hertlein, 1939; Cylichna veleronis A. M. Strong & Hertlein, 1939 ·

= Aliculastrum exaratum =

Species of gastropod

Aliculastrum exaratum is a species of gastropods belonging to the family Haminoeidae.

== Description ==
The length of the shell attains 6.8 mm, its diameter 3.3 mm.

(Original description in Latin) A small, elliptical, and compressed shell with a narrow, elongated aperture. The shell is brown, encased in a thin epidermis. It is finely grooved in a spiral pattern with lines that vary in spacing and tend to fade towards the middle. The spire is shallowly umbilicated, with the interior marked by distinct transverse striations. The outer lip is extended posteriorly, while the inner lip mimics an umbilical slit as it approaches the columella.

(Description as Atys chimera) The shell is elongate-ovoid, with a shining, translucent, white appearance. Growth lines are pronounced, especially near the outer lip, with approximately nine incised spiral lines posteriorly and around sixteen anteriorly. These lines are separated by a narrow, clear band above the middle of the shell and are unequally spaced, becoming closer toward the extremities. The shell is obliquely truncate at the top, with the apex being narrowly and falsely umbilicated. The growth lines are prominently visible, dipping deeply into the cavity. The aperture is as long as the shell, featuring a well-rounded notch or posterior siphonal canal where the outer lip rises from the edge of the false umbilicus. The aperture is narrow for the first three-fifths, then widens sharply. The outer lip is subangulate above, and slightly convex as it runs nearly parallel with the upper portion of the inner lip, joining the sharply convex and slightly effuse basal lip. The columella is nearly straight in its lower part, sharply concave above, with a strong callus that is reflexed to partially cover the deep and moderately large umbilicus, extending thinly over the lower portion of the inner lip.

== Distribution ==
The marine species occurs off Baja California, Mexico and the Pacific coast of Central America.
