= Atys ehrenbergi =

Scientific classification
- Kingdom: Animalia
- Phylum: Mollusca
- Class: Gastropoda
- Order: Cephalaspidea
- Family: Haminoeidae
- Genus: Atys
- Species: A. ehrenbergi

Binomial name
- Atys ehrenbergi (Issel, 1869)

Synonyms
- Alicula ehrenbergi Issel, 1869 (original combination)

Species of gastropod

Atys ehrenbergi is a species of small tropical sea snail, a bubble snail, a marine opisthobranch gastropod mollusk in the family Haminoeidae, the haminoea bubble snails.

== Description ==
The length of the shell attains 11 mm.

(Original description in Italian) The shell is dilated both anteriorly and posteriorly.

== Distribution ==
This marine species occurs in the Red Sea; also as an alien species in the Mediterranean Sea off Greece and Turkey.
