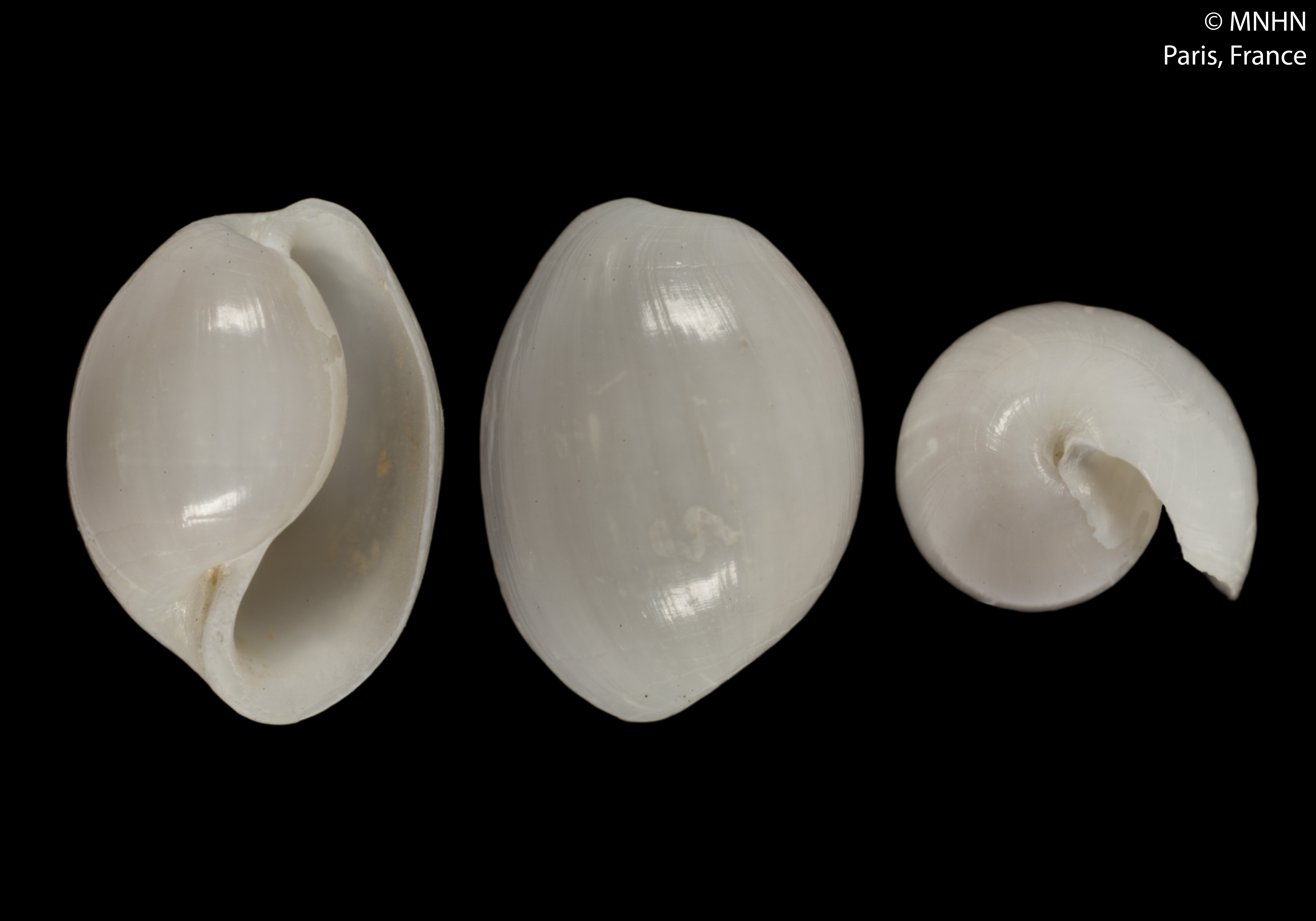
- Shell of Micratys wareni (holotype at MNHN, Paris)

Scientific classification
- Domain: Eukaryota
- Kingdom: Animalia
- Phylum: Mollusca
- Class: Gastropoda
- Order: Cephalaspidea
- Genus: Micratys; Habe, 1952

Type species
- Micratys ovum Habe, 1952

Synonyms

= Micratys =

Genus of molluscs

Micratys is a genus of very small sea snails, unassigned in a family in the order Cephalaspidea (bubble snails).

== Species ==
- Micratys ovum Habe, 1952
- Micratys wareni Valdés, 2008
