= Sporisorium ehrenbergii =

Scientific classification
- Domain: Eukaryota
- Kingdom: Fungi
- Division: Basidiomycota
- Class: Ustilaginomycetes
- Order: Ustilaginales
- Family: Ustilaginaceae
- Genus: Sporisorium
- Species: S. ehrenbergii

Binomial name
- Sporisorium ehrenbergii (Kühner) Vánky (1990)

Synonyms
- Tolyposporium ehrenbergi (J.G. Kühn) Pat. (1903)

Species of fungus

Sporisorium ehrenbergi (syn. Tolyposporium ehrenbergi) is a species of fungus in the Ustilaginaceae family. It is a plant pathogen, causing long smut of Sorghum spp.
