= Astragalus ehrenbergii =

Scientific classification
- Kingdom: Plantae
- Clade: Tracheophytes
- Clade: Angiosperms
- Clade: Eudicots
- Clade: Rosids
- Order: Fabales
- Family: Fabaceae
- Subfamily: Faboideae
- Genus: Astragalus
- Species: A. ehrenbergii

Binomial name
- Astragalus ehrenbergii Bunge

Synonyms
- Tragacantha ehrenbergii Kuntze

Species of legume

Astragalus ehrenbergii (also called Tragacantha ehrenbergii or in Hebrew "קדד אהרנברג") is a terrestrial, perennial plant with alternating, smooth pinnate leaves and yellow flowers. Ehrenbergii blooms in June, and can be found in Israel.
