= Vertex (gastropod) =

In malacology the vertex refers to the topmost point or summit of the shell. While it is often used interchangeably with the word apex, there is still a subtle distinction in descriptive malacology, especially regarding the "bubble snails" (Haminoeidae and Atys).

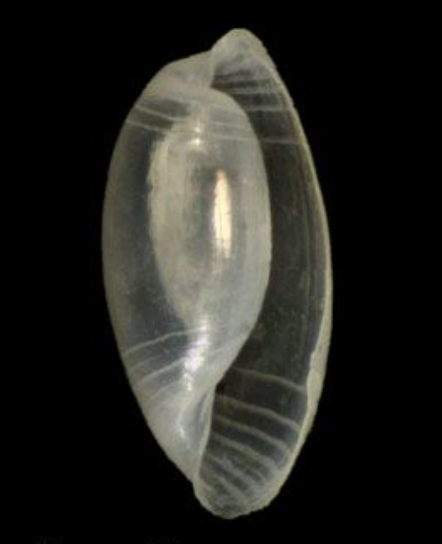
Atys angustatus with a vertex

Apex: generally refers to the embryonic beginning of the shell (the protoconch). It is a chronological term for the "oldest" part of the shell.

Vertex: primarily a geometric term. It refers to the highest physical point of the shell when it is held in its standard orientation (spire up).

In many snails, the apex and the vertex are the same point. However, in "sunken spire" shells (like Atys), the true apex might be hidden or tucked inside a depression, making the vertex the rim or highest curve surrounding that depression.

Anatomical Contexts:

- Truncated vertex: when the top of the shell looks "cut off" rather than coming to a sharp point.
- Apical crater/depression: In many bubble snails, the vertex is not a point but a hollow. The description "lip rises from the centre of the apical crater" refers to the aperture starting from within this top depression.
- Perforate vertex: a small hole or "pin-prick" at the very top of the shell (such as in Atys miranda)
