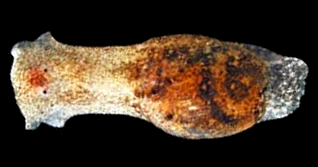
- live Haminoea sp.
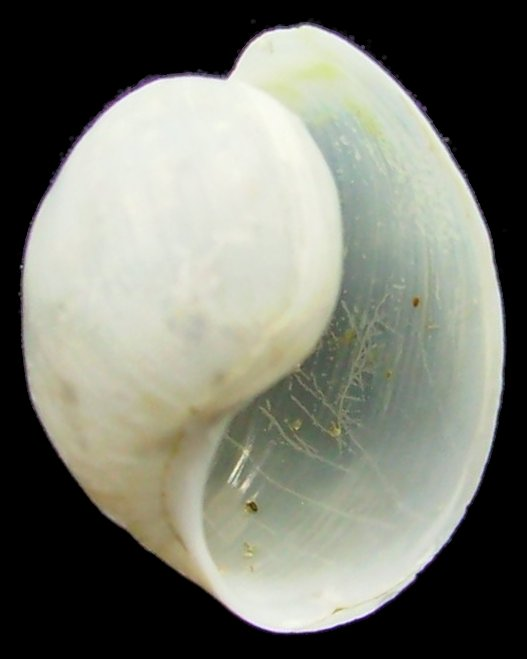
- A shell of Haminoea zelandiae

Scientific classification
- Kingdom: Animalia
- Phylum: Mollusca
- Class: Gastropoda
- Subterclass: Tectipleura
- Order: Cephalaspidea
- Superfamily: Haminoeoidea
- Family: Haminoeidae; Pilsbry, 1895

Synonyms
- Atydidae Thiele, 1925 (ranked as subfamily of Haminoeidae); Atydinae Thiele, 1925· accepted, alternate representation; Bullactidae Thiele, 1926; Hamineidae (Spelling variation); Haminoeinae Pilsbry, 1895· accepted, alternate representation; Ophthalmidae Bergh, 1905 · unaccepted (unavailable name: not based on a genus); Smaragdinellidae Thiele, 1925

= Haminoeidae =

Family of gastropods

Haminoeidae, commonly known as the haminoeid bubble snail family, is a taxonomic family of sea snails, marine opisthobranch gastropod mollusks in the superfamily Haminoeoidea.

The name of this family has long been controversial, and used to be Atyidae or Atydidae. Another, but incorrect, spelling was Haminaeidae (See (ICZN) 2000. Opinion 1942).

A number of genera have been proposed for this family, but the species are hard to identify (or sometimes impossible to identify) by looking only at the external characteristics. Until the internal anatomy of 'wet' specimens has been fully described, the status of many of the genera listed here is uncertain.

== Distribution ==
These bubble snails occur in all warm or temperate seas.

== Habitat ==
These are sand dwellers or they live on muddy bottoms, in bays, estuaries, and close to the shore in tidepools.

== Description of the live animal ==
These are colorful snails, that can partially take the color of the sea floor.

Their large cephalic shield is rounded at the front, but deeply lobed behind. The mantle protrudes behind the shell. The shell is partially or completely enfolded by lateral parapodial (=fleshy winglike outgrowths) lobes.

== Shell description ==
Their shell varies in size according to the species, from 3 mm to 30 mm.

The shell is ovoid, thin and translucent. It may be smooth or have spiral grooves (striae). The umbilical apex is sunken or enclosed and no longer visible. Large body whorl with fine spiral striations. Smooth columella. The thin outer lip of the aperture extends beyond the apex of the shell and is thus longer than the body whorl. The aperture narrows posteriorly and is wider anteriorly.

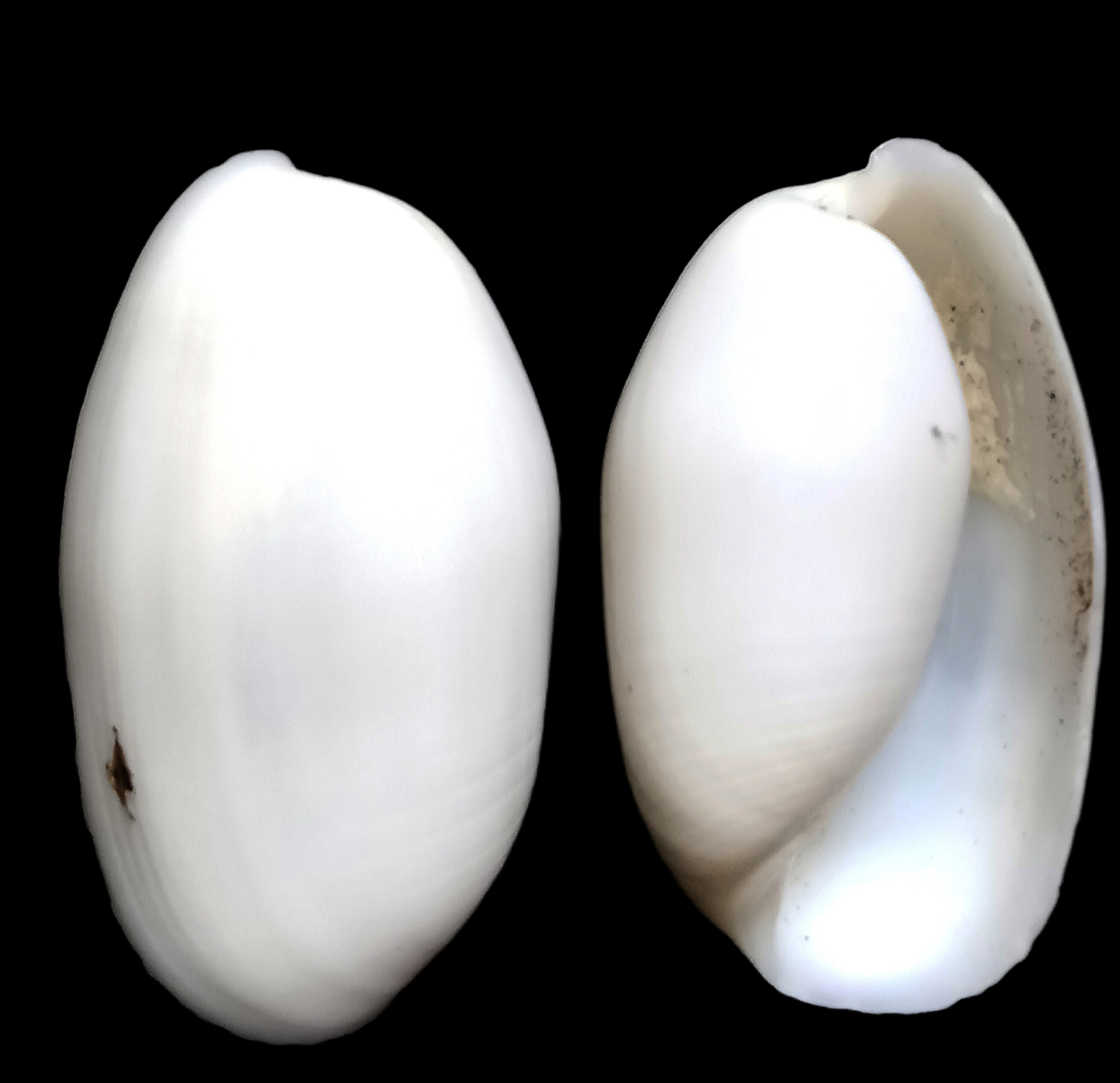

== Ecology ==
These snails are herbivorous. Their diet consists of various kinds of green algae. They can survive in brackish water.

They are hermaphrodites. Their eggs are deposited in round or oval jellylike strings, attached to eelgrass or sand.

Atys naucum and Atys cylindricum are known to show biological fluorescence.

== Genera and species ==
Genera within the family Haminoeidae include:

- Aliculastrum Pilsbry, 1896
- Atys Montfort, 1810
- Bakawan Oskars & Malaquias, 2019
- Bullacta Bergh, 1901 - with the only species: Bullacta exarata (Philippi, 1849)
- Confettiella Oskars, 2024
- Cylichnatys Kuroda & Habe, 1952
- Diniatys Iredale, 1936
- Haloa Pilsbry, 1921
- Haminella Thiele, 1925
- Haminoea Turton & Kingston in Carrington, 1830
- Lamprohaminoea Habe, 1952
- Liloa Pilsbry, 1921
- Papawera Oskars & Malaquias, 2019
- Phanerophthalmus A. Adams, 1850
- Roxaniella Monterosato, 1884
- Sericohaminoea Habe, 1952: synonym of Haloa Pilsbry, 1921
- Smaragdinella A. Adams, 1848
- Vellicolla Oskars, Too, Rees, P. M. Mikkelsen, Willassen & Malaquias, 2019
- Weinkauffia Monterosato, 1884

Genera brought into synonymy

- Alicula Ehrenberg, 1831: synonym of Aliculastrum Pilsbry, 1896 (invalid: junior homonym of Alicula Eichwald, 1830; Aliculastrum is a replacement name)
- Atyscaphander Annandale, 1924: synonym of Bullacta Bergh, 1901
- Austrocylichna Burn, 1974: synonym of Roxaniella Monterosato, 1884
- Cryptophthalmus Ehrenberg, 1828: synonym of Phanerophthalmus A. Adams, 1850 (invalid: junior homonym of Cryptophthalmus Rafinesque, 1814 [Crustacea]; Lathophthalmus is a replacement name)
- Dinia H. Adams & A. Adams, 1854: synonym of Diniatys Iredale, 1936
- Glauconella Gray, 1850: synonym of Smaragdinella A. Adams, 1848
- Haminaea Gray, 1847: synonym of Haminoea Turton & Kingston in Carrington, 1830
- Haminoeatys Is. Taki, 1951: synonym of Liloa Pilsbry, 1921 (unavailable name: nomen nudum)
- Lathophthalmus Pruvot-Fol, 1932: synonym of Phanerophthalmus A. Adams, 1850
- Limulatys Iredale, 1936: synonym of Weinkauffia Weinkauff, 1873
- Linteria A. Adams, 1850: synonym of Smaragdinella A. Adams, 1848
- Micraenigma S. S. Berry, 1953: synonym of Diniatys Iredale, 1936
- Naucum Schumacher, 1817: synonym of Atys Montfort, 1810 (objective synonym)
- Nipponatys Habe, 1952; synonym of Aliculastrum Pilsbry, 1896
- Parahaminoea Kuroda & Habe, 1952: synonym of Haloa Pilsbry, 1921 (unavailable name: no diagnosis)
- Penthominea Iredale, 1929: synonym of Haloa Pilsbry, 1921
- Sao H. Adams & A. Adams, 1854: synonym of Pyrunculus Pilsbry, 1895
- Sinohaminea Tchang, 1933: synonym of Bullacta Bergh, 1901
- Tepidatys Iredale, 1936: synonym of Weinkauffia Weinkauff, 1873
- Sphaeratys F. Nordsieck, 1972: synonym of Oxygyrus Benson, 1835
- Vitreohaminoea T. Habe, 1952: synonym of Haloa Pilsbry, 1921 (junior subjective synonym)
- Xanthonella Gray, 1850: synonym of Phanerophthalmus A. Adams, 1850

Brought to another family

- Micratys Habe, 1952: belongs to the family [unassigned] Cephalaspidea
- Mimatys Habe, 1952: belongs to the family Alacuppidae.
- Mnestia H. Adams & A. Adams, 1854; belongs to the family Mnestiidae

- Genus Diniatys
  - Diniatys dentifer A. Adams, 1850 - Distribution: Indo-Pacific, Length : 10 mm, Description : this herbivore is found on the bluegreen algae Lyngbya majuscula, Schizothrix and Hormothamnion. There is a pointed projection on the columella. The color varies between green and various shades of brown. The two black eyes are on the back of the cephalic shield.
  - Diniatys monodonta A. Adams, 1850
    - Distribution: Japan
- Genus Haloa
  - Haloa binotata (H. A. Pilsbry, 1895)
    - Distribution : Indo Pacific
  - Haloa constricta A. Adams, 1850
    - Distribution : Japan
  - Haloa crocata W. H. Pease, 1860
    - Distribution : Hawaii
  - Haloa flavescens (A. Adams, 1850)
    - Distribution : Indo Pacific
  - Haloa fusca W. H. Pease, 1863
    - Distribution : Indo Pacific
  - Haloa japonica H. A. Pilsbry, 1895 Japanese paper-bubble
    - Distribution : Indo Pacific, Japan
    - Length : 10 mm
    - Description : species with beautiful colors : glassy white background with tiny white spots and dark patches with orange dots.
  - Haloa kawamurai T. Habe, 1950
    - Distribution : Indo Pacific
  - Haloa margaritoides T. Kuroda & T. Habe, 1971
    - Distribution : Japan
    - Length : 7 mm
    - Description : intertidal among seaweeds
  - Haloa nigripunctata W. H. Pease, 1868
    - Distribution : Japan
  - Haloa rotundata A. Adams, 1850
    - Distribution : Japan
  - Haloa vitrea (A. Adams, 1850)
    - Distribution : Japan
  - Haloa yamaguchii T. Habe, 1952
    - Distribution : Indo Pacific
- Genus Hamineobulla Habe, 1950 (incertae sedis; may be belong to the family Bullidae)
  - Hamineobulla kawamurai Habe, 1950
    - Distribution : Okinawa
    - Length : 6 mm
    - Description : brown animal with short cephalic shield; on the shell there are a few transverse rows with brighter dots
- Genus Liloa Pilsbry, 1921

Since most of these bubble snails were named on the basis of the shell alone, the occurrence of synonyms among the following species is quite possible.

  - Liloa brevis (Quoy & Gaimard, 1833)
    - Distribution : Australia
    - Description : elongate body; parapodial flaps cover only the front of the thin, fragile shell
  - Liloa curta (A. Adams, 1850)
    - Distribution : Western Pacific
    - Description : elongate body; the color can vary from a few dark spots on a translucent body, to almost completely dark.
  - Liloa incisula Yokoyama, 1928
    - Distribution : Japan
  - Liloa laeta A. A. Gould, 1859
    - Distribution : Indo Pacific
  - Liloa nipponensis Nomura & Hatai, 1940
    - Distribution : Japan
  - Liloa porcellana A. A. Gould, 1859
    - Distribution : Japan
  - Liloa tomaculum H. A. Pilsbry, 1951
    - Distribution : Hawaiian Islands
  - Liloa translucens A. Adams, 1862
    - Distribution : Japan
- Genus Limulatys Iredale, 1936
  - Limulatys constrictus T. Habe, 1952
    - Distribution : Indo Pacific
    - Length : 16 mm
  - Limulatys crassilabris (J. Thiele, 1925)
    - Distribution : S.E. Asia, Thailand
    - Length : 8 mm
  - Limulatys fusiformis T. Habe, 1952
    - Distribution : Japan
  - Limulatys muscarius A. A. Gould, 1859
    - Distribution : Indo Pacific, Philippines
  - Limulatys okamotoi T. Habe, 1952
    - Distribution : Indo Pacific
  - Limulatys ooformis T. Habe, 1964 Egg-shaped Bubble
    - Distribution : Indo Pacific, Philippines, Thailand
    - Length : 20 mm
  - Limulatys okamotoi Habe, 1952
    - Distribution : Philippines
    - Length : 9 mm
  - Limulatys reliquus Iredale, 1936
    - Distribution : New Zealand
  - Limulatys scobriculatus A. Adams, 1862
    - Distribution : Japan
  - Limulatys tortuosus A. Adams, 1850
    - Distribution : Japan
- Genus Micratys Habe, 1952
  - Micratys ovum T. Habe, 1952
    - Distribution : Japan, Philippines
    - Length : 2 mm
- Genus Mimatys Habe, 1952
  - Mimatys fukuokaensis T. Habe, 1952
    - Distribution : Japan, Philippines
    - Length : 2.5 mm
- Genus Nipponatys Kurida & Habe, 1952
  - Nipponatys amakusaensis T. Habe & Kikuchi, 1960
    - Distribution : Japan
  - Nipponatys oshimai T. Habe & Kikuchi, 1960
  - Nipponatys volvulina A. Adams, 1862
    - Distribution : Japan
- Genus Sericohaminoea Habe, 1952
- Genus Sphaeratys F. Nordsieck, 1972 (?)
- Genus Ventomnestia
  - Ventomnestia bizona (A. Adams, 1850)
  - Ventomnestia colorata Iredale, 1936
  - Ventomnestia villica (Gould, 1859) (may be a synonym of Ventomnestia bizona)
    - Distribution : Guam
    - Length : 5.5 mm
    - Description : a bubble snail with a great variation in color, from white to brown, but always with a characteristic pattern; heavy shell; radula formula : 2.1.2;
- Genus Weinkauffia A. Adams, 1858
  - Weinkauffia diaphana A. Aradas & Maggiore, 1839
    - Distribution : West Africa
    - Description : has similar gizzard plates as Atys multistriatus
  - Weinkauffia turgidula Forbes, 1844
    - Distribution : Adriatic Sea, Malta, Turkey
    - Length : 5 mm
    - Description : fossils of this species have been found in sediments of Pliocene age in Italy.
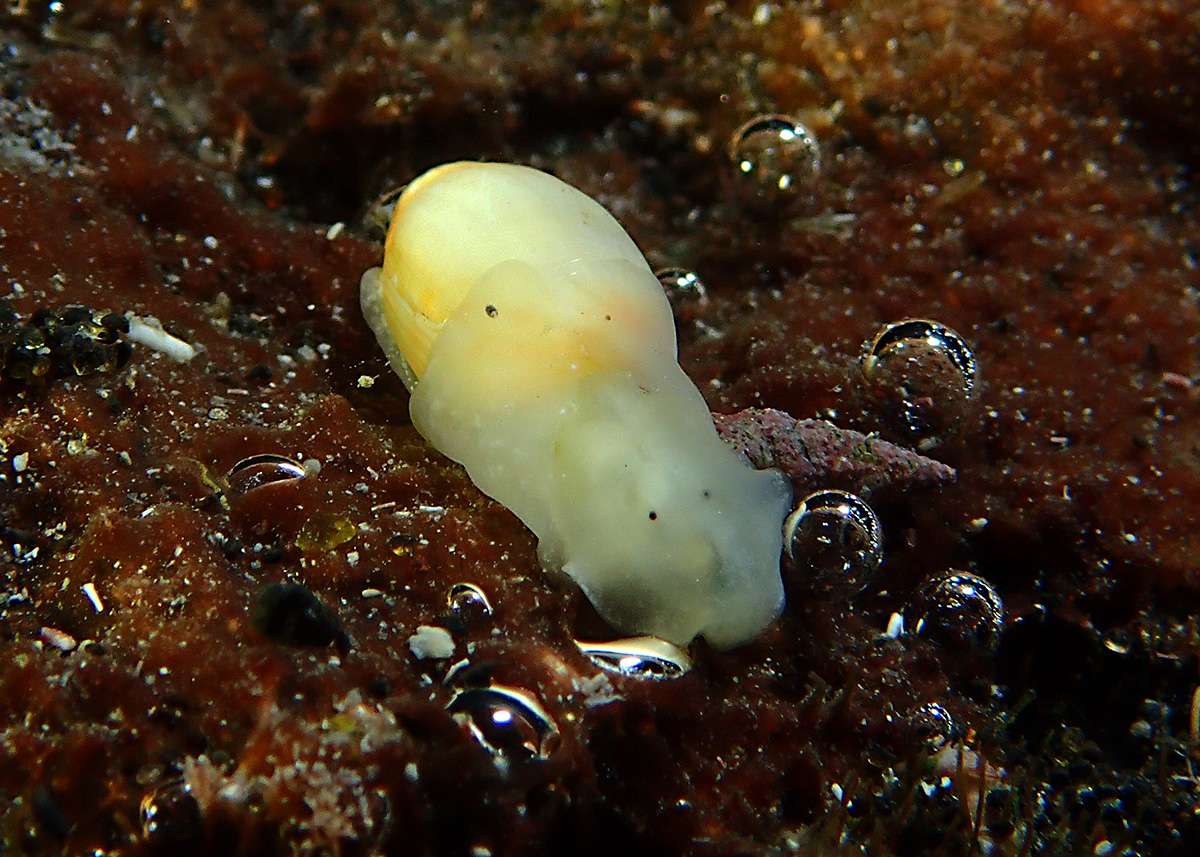
Aliculastrum cylindricum

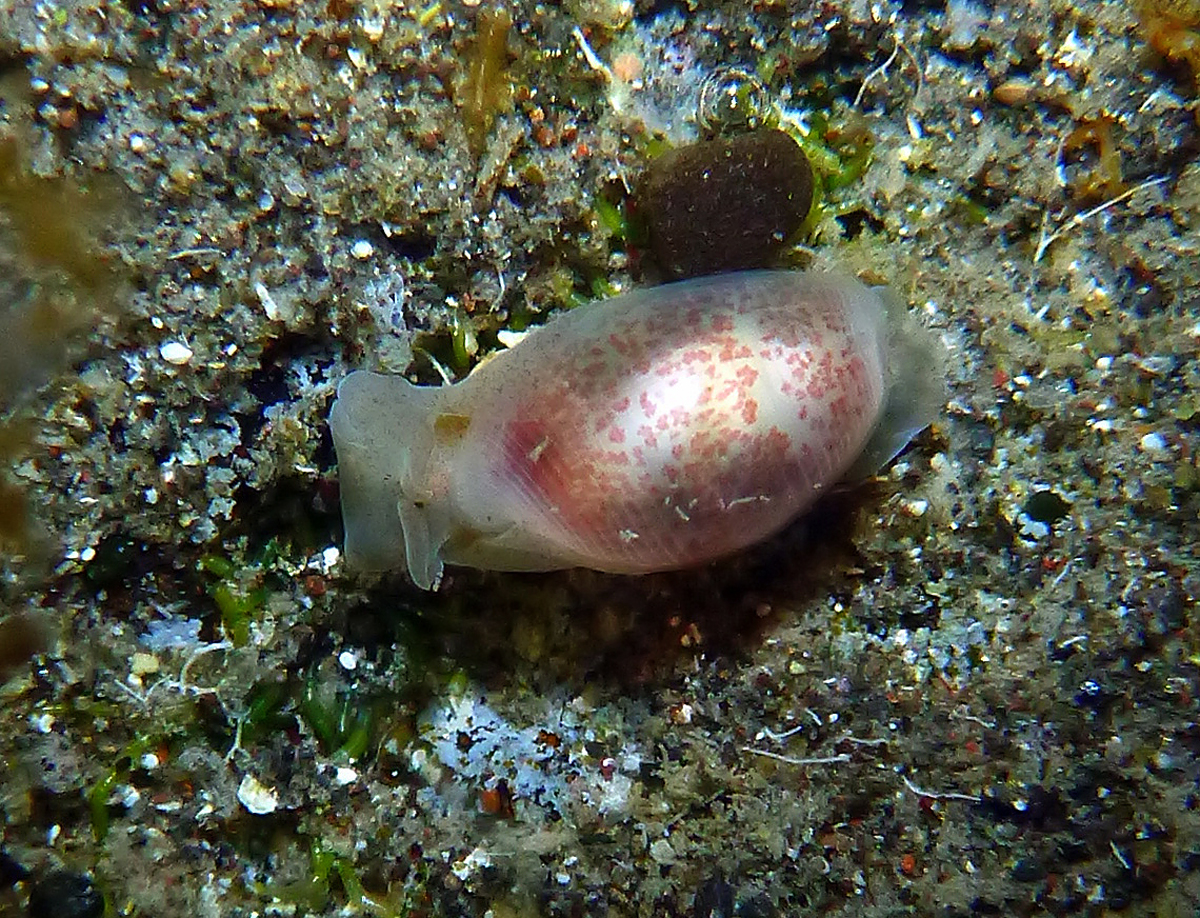
Atys semistriata

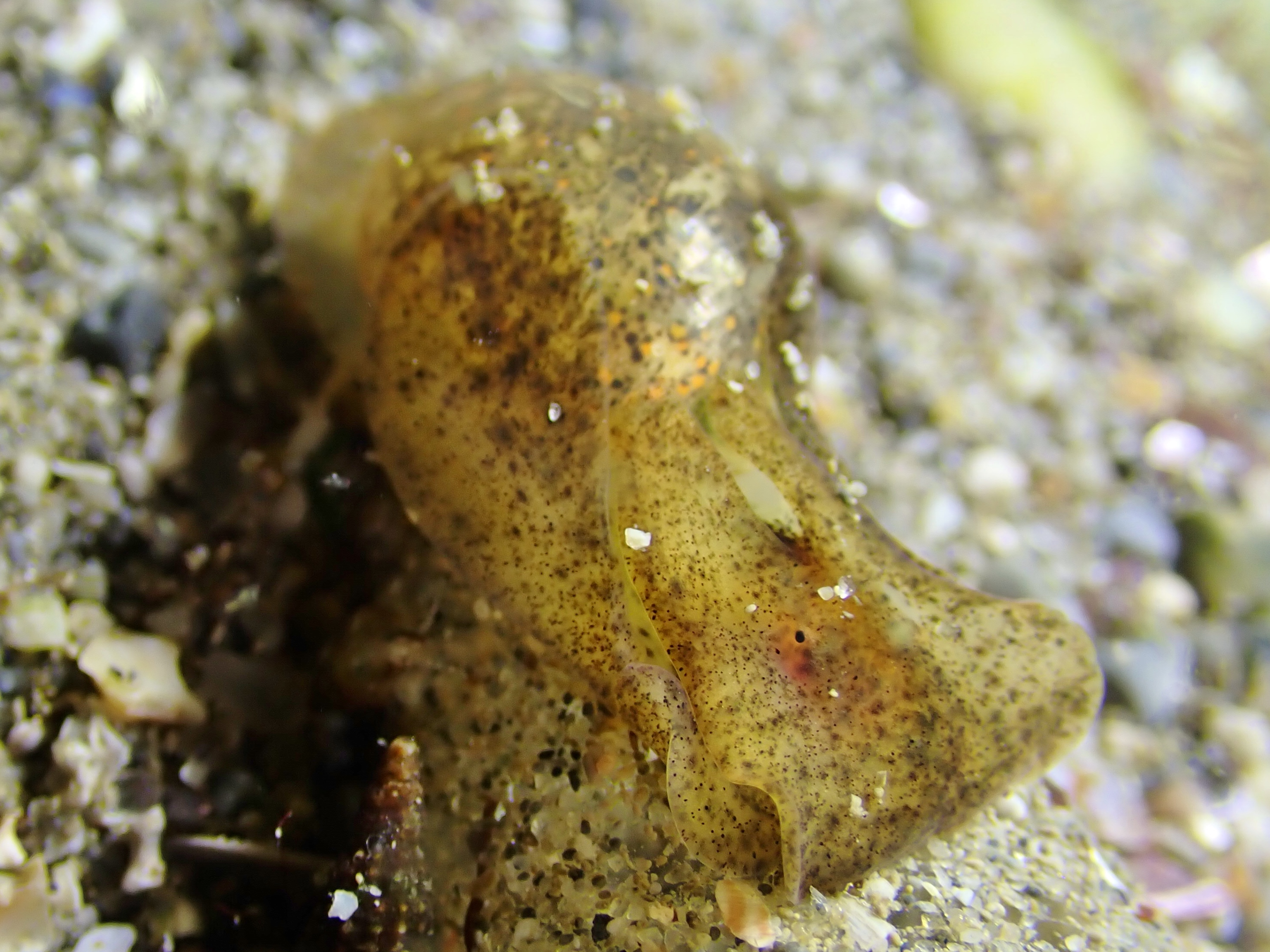
Haloa japonica

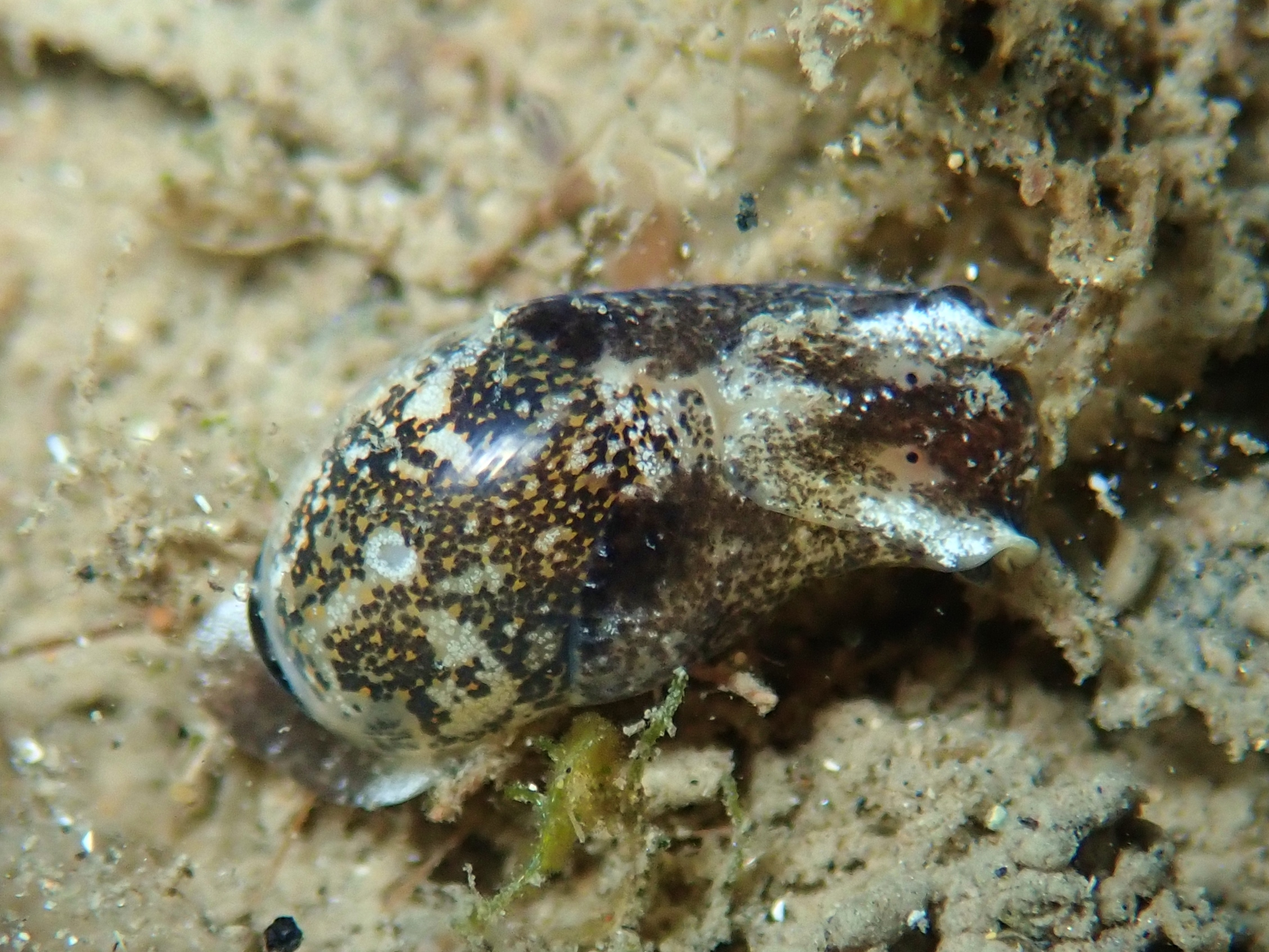
Haminoea exigua

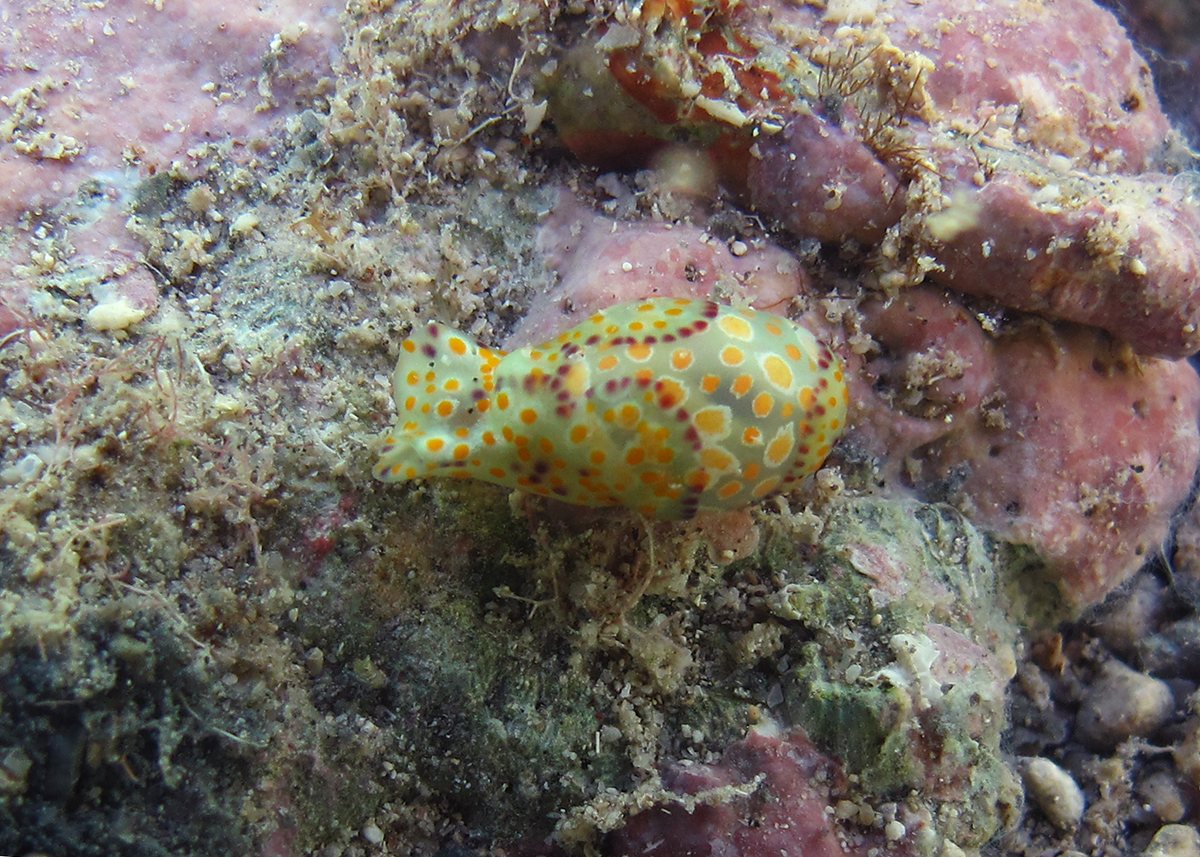
Lamprohaminoea ovalis

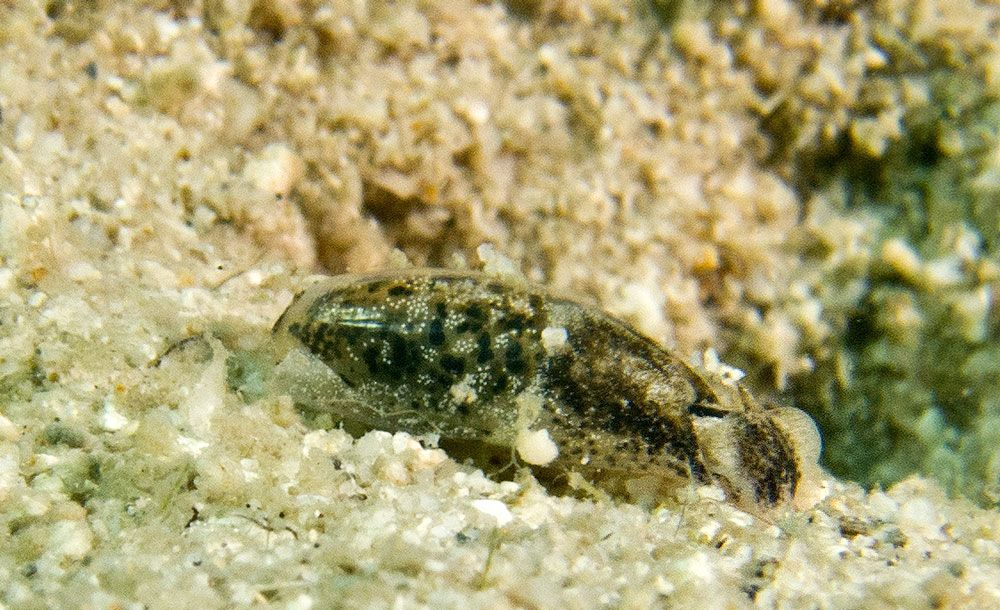
Papawera maugeansis

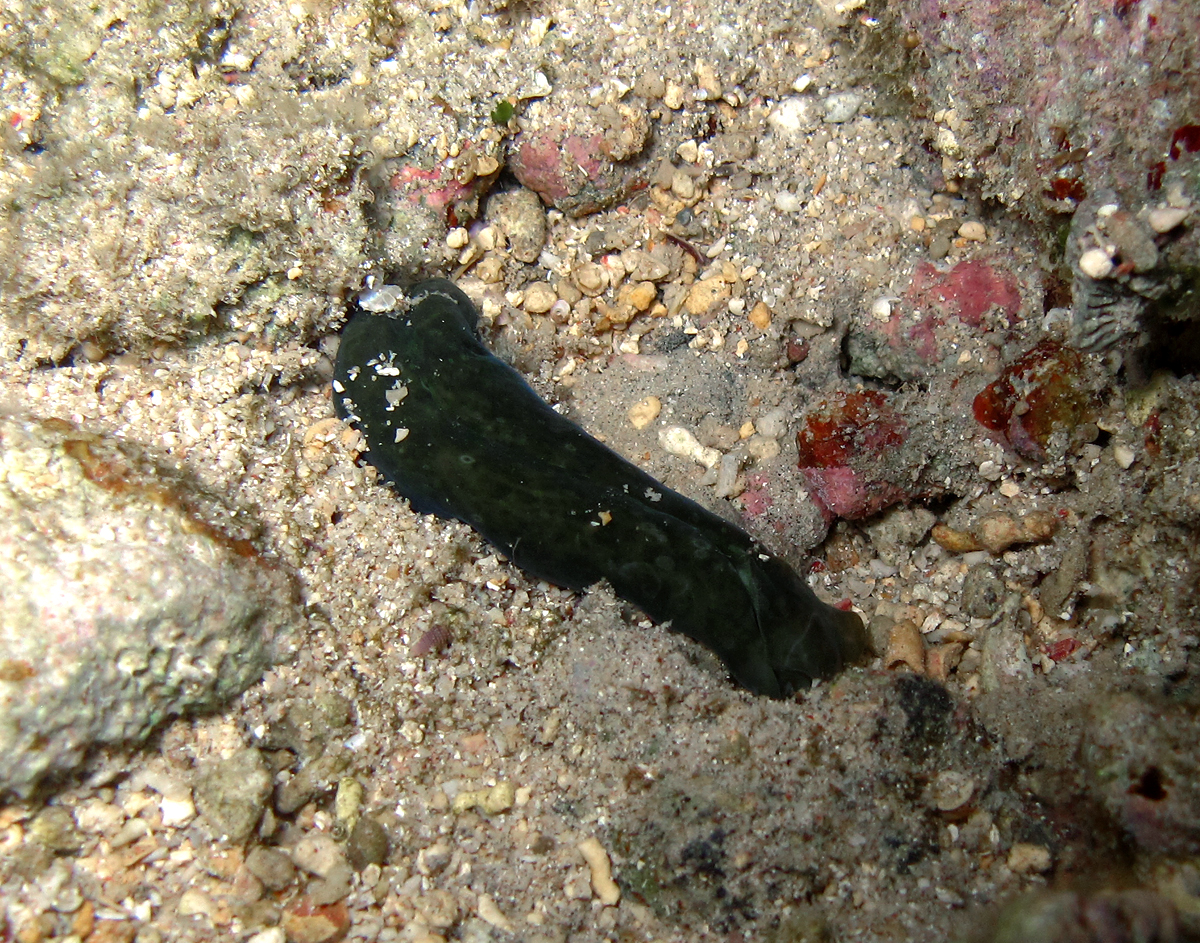
Phanerophthalmus smaragdinus

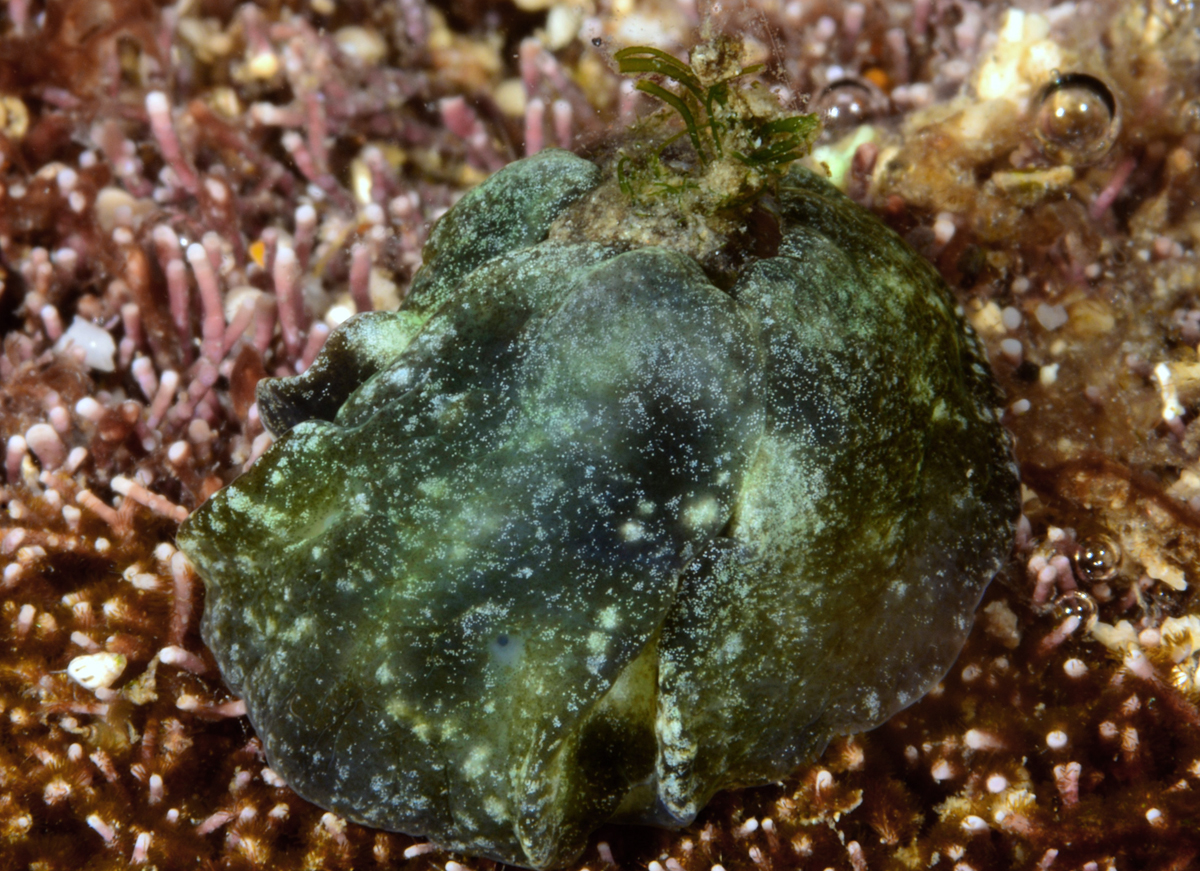
Smaragdinella calyculata
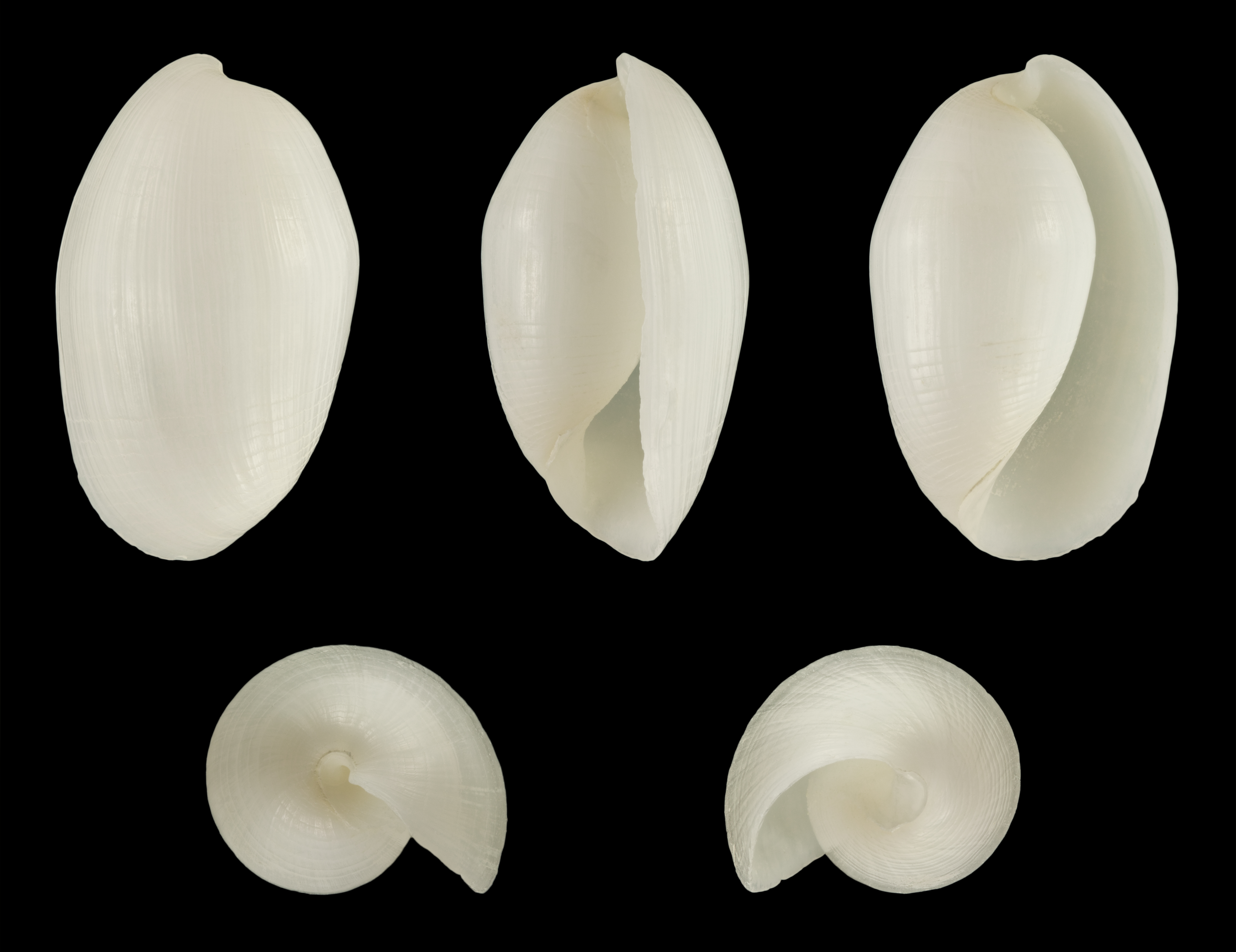
Aliculastrum cylindricum shell

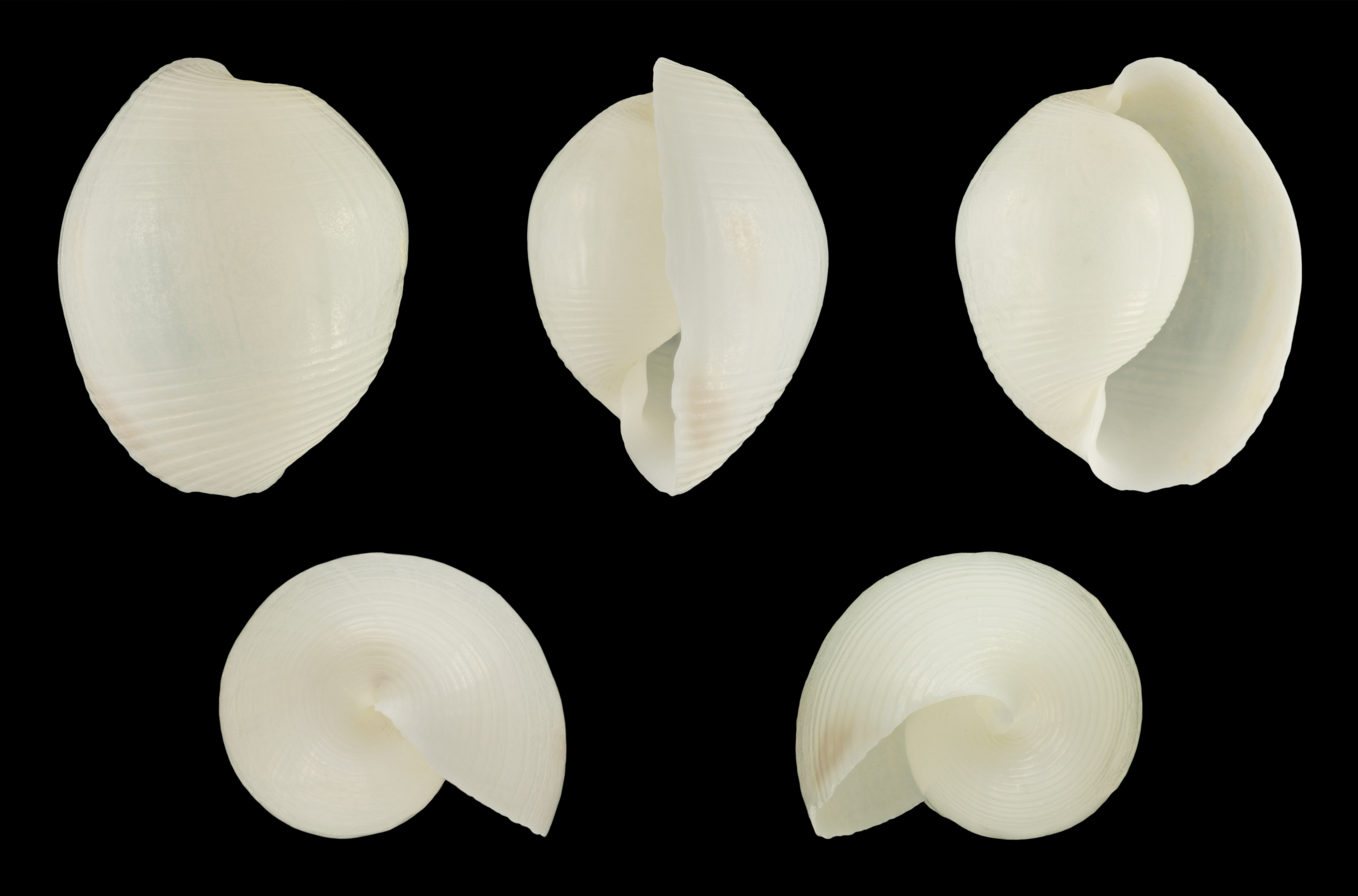
Atys naucum

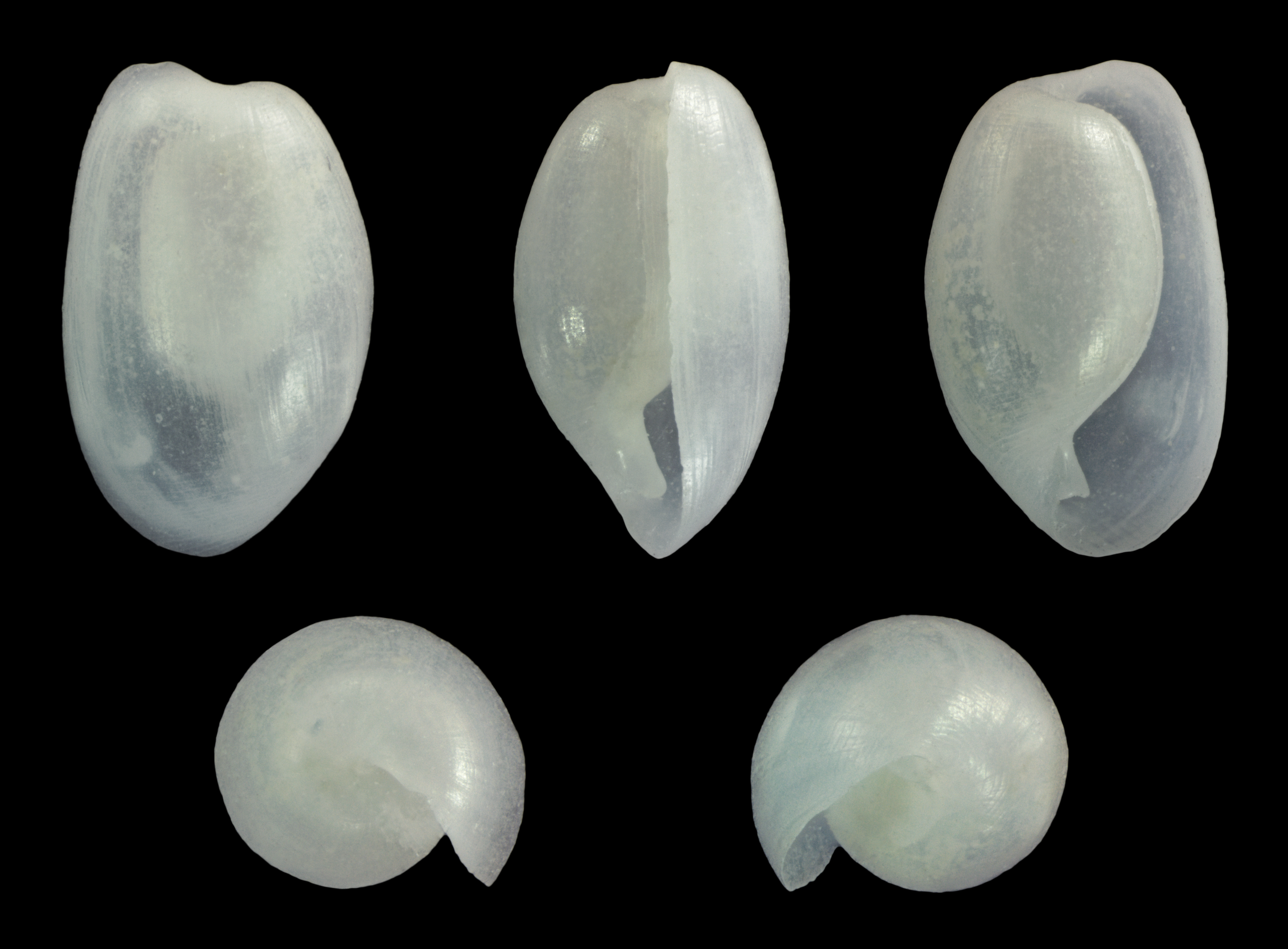
Diniatys dentifer

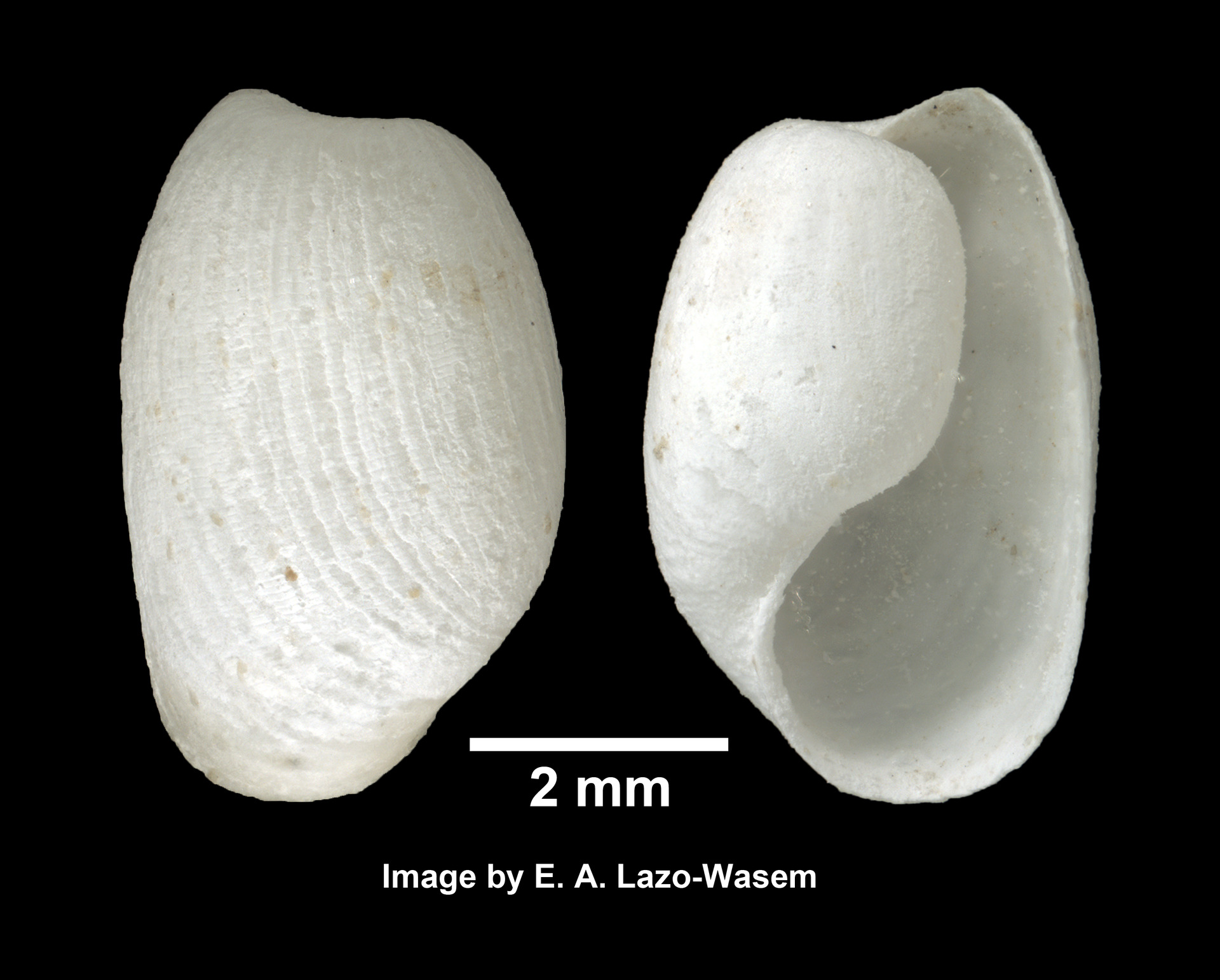
Haminella solitaria

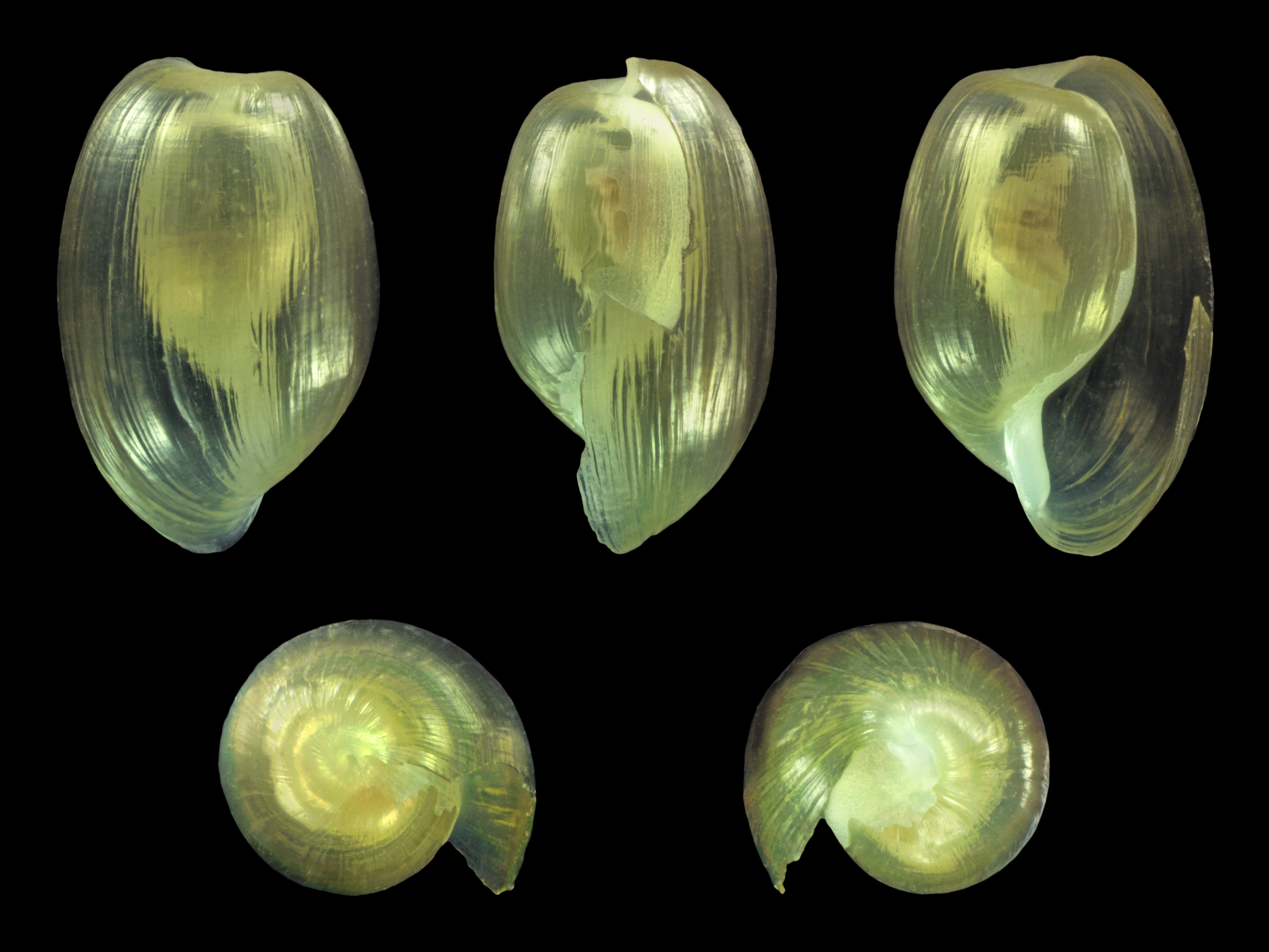
Haminoea hydatis

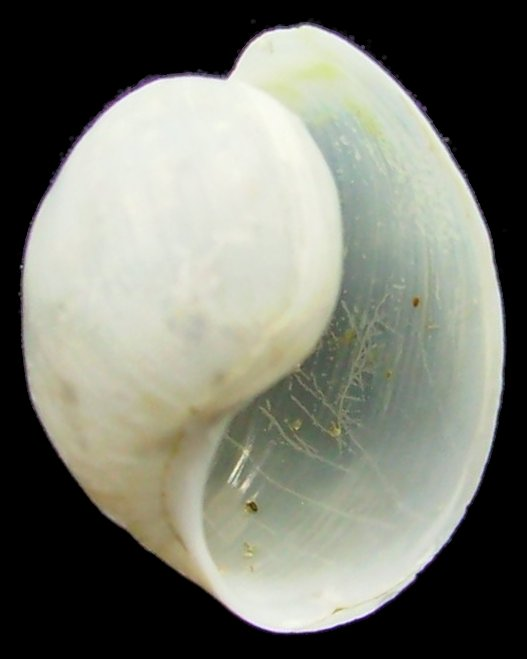
Papawera zelandiae

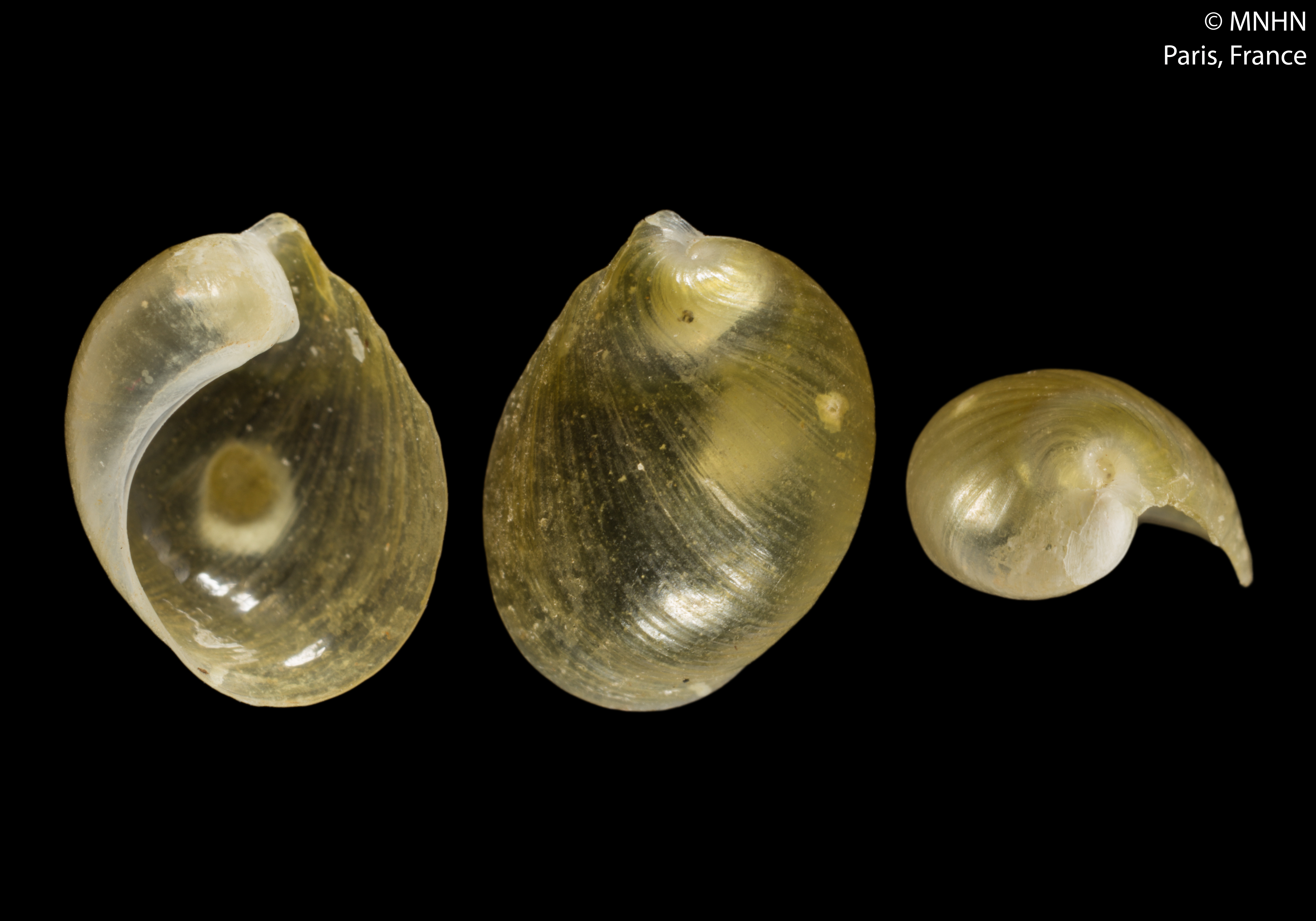
Smaragdinella fragilis
