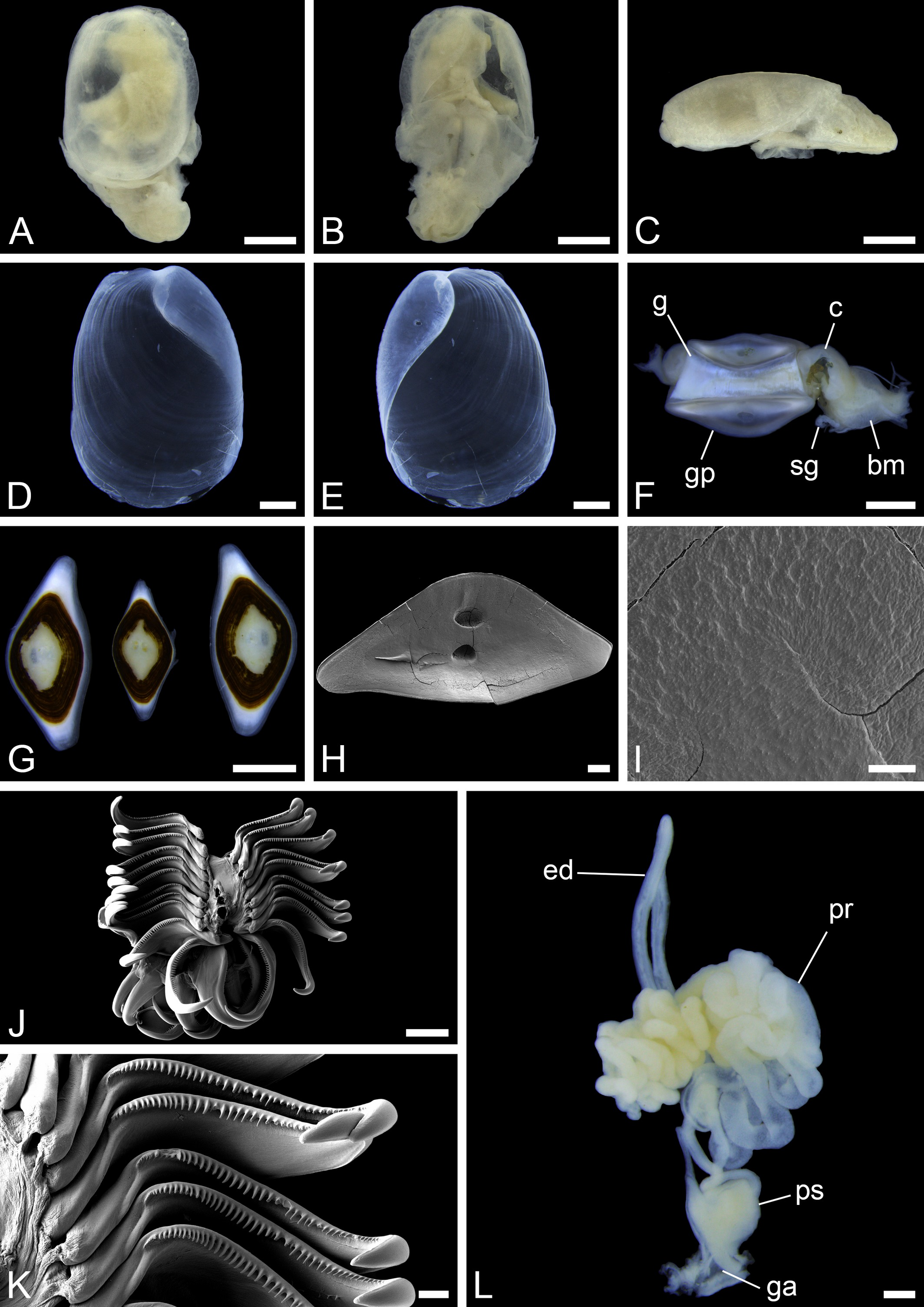
- A overview of Philine

Scientific classification
- Kingdom: Animalia
- Phylum: Mollusca
- Class: Gastropoda
- Order: Cephalaspidea
- Superfamily: Philinoidea
- Family: Philinidae
- Genus: Philine; Peter Ascanius, 1772

Type species
- Philine quadripartita Ascanius, 1772

Synonyms
- Bulla (Bullea) [sic] (misspelling for Bullaea Lamarck, 1801); Bullaea Lamarck, 1801; Bullea [sic] (misspelling for Bullaea Lamarck, 1801); Choshiphiline Habe, 1958; Johania Monterosato, 1884; Lobaria O.F. Müller, 1776; Philingwynia F. Nordsieck, 1972; Woodbridgea S. S. Berry, 1953 (doubtful synonym)

= Philine (genus) =

Genus of gastropods

Philine is a genus of sea slugs or sea snails, marine gastropod molluscs in the subfamily Philininae of the family Philinidae, the headshield slugs or paper bubbles.

== Species ==
Species within the genus Philine include:

- Philine abyssicola Valdès, 2008
- Philine aethiopica Thiele, 1925
- Philine alboides Price, Gosliner & Valdés, 2011
- Philine amabilis Verrill, 1880
- Philine angasi Crosse and Fischer, 1865
- Philine angulata Jeffreys, 1867 - angled paper-bubble, angled paperbubble
- Philine aperta (Linnaeus, 1767)
- Philine approximans Dautzenberg & Fischer H., 1896
- Philine araneosa van der Linden, 1995
- Philine argentina Carcelles, 1947
- Philine auriformis Suter, 1909
- Philine azorica Bouchet, 1975
- Philine babai Valdés, 2008
- Philine bakeri Dall, 1919
- Philine baxteri Valdés, Cadien & Gosliner, 2016
- Philine beachportensis Verco, 1909
- Philine berghi E. A. Smith, 1910
- Philine buchensis Caballer & Ortea, 2015
- Philine burrowsi Burn, 1961
- Philine caballeri Ortea, Espinosa & Moro, 2001
- Philine caledonica Risbec, 1951
- Philine candeana (d'Orbigny, 1841)
- Philine catena (Montagu, 1803)
- Philine cerebralis Malaquias, Ohnheiser, Oskars & Willassen, 2016
- Philine columnaria Hedley & May, 1908
- Philine complanata Watson, 1897
- Philine constricta Murdoch and Suter, 1906
- Philine cumingii (Adams 1862)
- Philine denticulata (J. Adams, 1800)
- Philine dentiphallus Gonzales & Gosliner, 2014
- Philine elegans Bergh, 1905
- Philine exigua Challis, 1969
- Philine fenestra Price, Gosliner & Valdés, 2011
- Philine gelida van der Linden, 1995
- Philine guineensis Ev. Marcus & Er. Marcus, 1966
- Philine habei Valdés, 2008
- Philine harrisae Valdés, Cadien & Gosliner, 2016
- Philine hemphilli Dall, 1919
- Philine infortunata Pilsbry, 1895
- Philine infundibulum Dall, 1889
- Philine intricata Monterosato, 1875
- Philine iris Tringali, 2001
- Philine kinglipini Tchang, 1934
- Philine kurodai Habe, 1946
- Philine lucida Dall, 1927
- Philine malaquiasi Valdés, Cadien & Gosliner, 2016
- Philine mcleani Valdés, Cadien & Gosliner, 2016
- Philine mera Ev. Marcus & Er. Marcus, 1969
- Philine monilifera Bouchet, 1975
- Philine monterosati Monterosato, 1874
- Philine multipapillata Gonzales & Gosliner, 2014
- Philine orca Gosliner, 1988
- Philine orientalis A. Adams, 1854
- Philine multipapillata Gonzales & Gosliner, 2014
- Philine paucipapillata Price, Gosliner & Valdés, 2011
- Philine pittmani Gonzales & Gosliner, 2014
- Philine planata Dall, 1889
- Philine polystrigma (Dall, 1908)
- Philine powelli Rudman, 1870
- Philine puka Price, Gosliner & Valdés, 2011
- Philine punctata (J. Adams, 1800)
- Philine quadripartita Ascanius, 1772
- Philine rubra Bergh, 1905
- Philine rubrata Gosliner, 1988
- Philine rugosula Dautzenberg & Fischer H., 1896
- Philine sagra (d'Orbigny, 1841) - crenulate paper-bubble, crenulate paperbubble
- Philine sarcophaga Price, Gosliner & Valdés, 2011
- Philine scalpta Adams, 1862
- Philine schrammi Malaquias, Ohnheiser, Oskars & Willassen, 2016
- † Philine seyithasanensis Landau, Harzhauser, İslamoğlu & C. M. Silva, 2013
- Philine sinuata Stimpson, 1851
- Philine striatula Monterosato, 1874
- Philine striolata A. Adams, 1862
- † Philine takatensis Yokoyama, 1922
- Philine talismani Sykes, 1905
- † Philine tepikia Rudman, 1970
- Philine teres Hedley, 1903
- Philine tincta A. E. Verrill, 1882 - tinted paper-bubble, tinted paperbubble
- Philine trapezia Hedley, 1902
- Philine umbilicata Murdoch and Suter, 1906
- Philine vaillanti Issel, 1869
- Philine verdensis Gonzales & Gosliner, 2014
- Philine vestita (Philippi, 1840)
- Philine wareni Valdés, Cadien & Gosliner, 2016

Taxa inquirenda

- Philine acutangula A. Adams, 1862
- Philine desmotis Watson, 1897
- Philine minuta Thiele, 1925
- Philine sykesii Melvill, 1904
- Philine truncatissima G. B. Sowerby II, 1870
- Philine vitrea Gould, 1859

Species brought into synonymy

- Philine alata Thiele, 1912: synonym of Antarctophiline alata (Thiele, 1912) (original combination)
- Philine alba Mattox, 1958 - white paper-bubble, white paperbubble: synonym of Philinorbis albus (Mattox, 1958) (original combination)
- Philine alternans van der Linden, 1995: synonym of Laona alternans (van der Linden, 1995) (original combination)
- Philine antarctica Smith, 1902: synonym of Waegelea antarctica (E. A. Smith, 1902) (original combination)
- Philine apertissima Smith, 1902: synonym of Antarctophiline apertissima (E. A. Smith, 1902) (original combination)
- Philine apertissima de Folin, 1893: synonym of Philine quadripartita Ascanius, 1772
- Philine argentata Gould, 1859: synonym of Philine orientalis A. Adams, 1854
- Philine californica Willett, 1944 - California paper-bubble, California paperbubble : synonym of Laona californica (Willett, 1944) (original combination)
- Philine calva van der Linden, 1995: synonym of Philine striatula Monterosato, 1874
- Philine chilla Er. Marcus & Ev. Marcus, 1969: synonym of Laona chilla (Er. Marcus & Ev. Marcus, 1969) (original combination)
- Philine cingulata G. O. Sars, 1878 - girdled paper-bubble, girdled paperbubble : synonym of Philine finmarchica M. Sars, 1858
- Philine condensa van der Linden, 1995: synonym of Laona condensa (van der Linden, 1995) (original combination)
- Philine confusa Ohnheiser & Malaquias, 2013: synonym of Laona confusa (Ohnheiser & Malaquias, 2013)
- Philine falklandica A. W. B. Powell, 1951: synonym of Antarctophiline falklandica (Powell, 1951) (original combination)
- Philine fragilis G. O. Sars, 1878 - fragile paper-bubble, fragile paperbubble : synonym of Philine finmarchica M. Sars, 1858: synonym of Praephiline finmarchica (M. Sars, 1859)
- Philine gibba (Strebel, 1908): synonym of Antarctophiline gibba (Strebel, 1908) (original combination)
- Philine gouldi Doello-Jurado, 1918: synonym of Antarctophiline gibba (Strebel, 1908)
- Philine grandioculi Ohnheiser & Malaquias, 2013: synonym of Laona grandioculi (Ohnheiser & Malaquias, 2013)
- Philine indistincta Ohnheiser & Malaquias, 2013: synonym of Hermania indistincta (Ohnheiser & Malaquias, 2013) (original combination)
- Philine japonica Lischke, 1872: synonym of Philine orientalis A. Adams, 1854
- Philine kawamurai (Habe, 1958): synonym of Globophiline kawamurai Habe, 1958
- Philine kerguelensis Thiele, 1925: synonym of Spiraphiline kerguelensis (Thiele, 1925) (original combination)
- Philine laevissima M. Sars, 1859: synonym of Diaphana hiemalis (Couthouy, 1839)
- Philine lima (T. Brown, 1825) - file paper-bubble, file paperbubble: synonym of Retusophiline lima (T. Brown, 1827)
- Philine lineolata (Couthouy, 1839): synonym of Philine lima (T. Brown, 1825): synonym of Retusophiline lima (T. Brown, 1827)
- Philine loveni Malm, 1858: synonym of Philine scabra (O. F. Müller, 1784)
- Philine milneedwardsi Locard, 1897: synonym of Philine quadripartita Ascanius, 1772
- Philine monterosatoi Sykes, 1905: synonym of Philine monterosati Monterosato, 1874 (unjustified emendation)
- Philine ossiansarsi Friele, 1877: synonym of Philine finmarchica M. Sars, 1858
- Philine polaris Aurivillius, 1885 - axial paper-bubble, axial paperbubble: synonym of Philine quadrata (S. Wood, 1839)
- Philine pruinosa (Clark, 1827): synonym of Laona pruinosa (W. Clark, 1827)
- Philine polystrigma (Dall, 1908): synonym of Woodbridgea polystrigma (Dall, 1908)
- Philine quadrata (S. V. Wood, 1839) - quadrate paper-bubble, quadrate paperbubble: synonym of Laona quadrata (S. Wood, 1839)
- Philine retifera (Forbes, 1844): synonym of Philine vestita (Philippi, 1840)
- Philine rugulosa (Dautzenberg & Fischer H., 1896): synonym of Philine rugosula Dautzenberg & Fischer H., 1896
- Philine scabra Muller, 1784: synonym of Hermania scabra (O. F. Müller, 1784)
- Philine sinuata Stimpson, 1851 - sinuate paper-bubble, sinuate paperbubble : synonym of Philine denticulata (Adams J., 1800)
- Philine striatella Tapparone-Canefri, 1874 : synonym of Philine orientalis A. Adams, 1854
- Philine trachyostraca Watson, 1897: synonym of Philine retifera (Forbes, 1844)
- Philine thurmanni Ev. Marcus & Er. Marcus, 1969: synonym of Laona thurmanni (Ev. Marcus & Er. Marcus, 1969)
- Philine ventricosa (Jeffreys, 1865): synonym of Laona ventricosa (Jeffreys, 1865)
