= Laona =

Laona can refer to:

- Laona Township, Winnebago County, Illinois
- Laona Township, Minnesota
- Laona, New York
- Laona, Wisconsin, a town
- Laona (community), Wisconsin, an unincorporated community within the town
- Laona (gastropod), a genus of sea slugs in the family Philinidae
