= Retusophiline =

Scientific classification
- Kingdom: Animalia
- Phylum: Mollusca
- Class: Gastropoda
- Order: Cephalaspidea
- Superfamily: Philinoidea
- Family: Laonidae
- Genus: Retusophiline; F.Nordsieck, 1772

Type species
- Bulla lima T. Brown, 1827

Synonyms
- Philine (Retusophiline) F. Nordsieck, 1972

Genus of gastropods

Retusophiline is a genus of sea slugs or sea snails, marine molluscs in the family Laonidae, and was first described by Fritz Nordsieck in 1972.

The type species is Bulla lima.

== Species ==
(as listed by GBIF)

- Retusophiline lima
- Retusophiline malaquiasi
