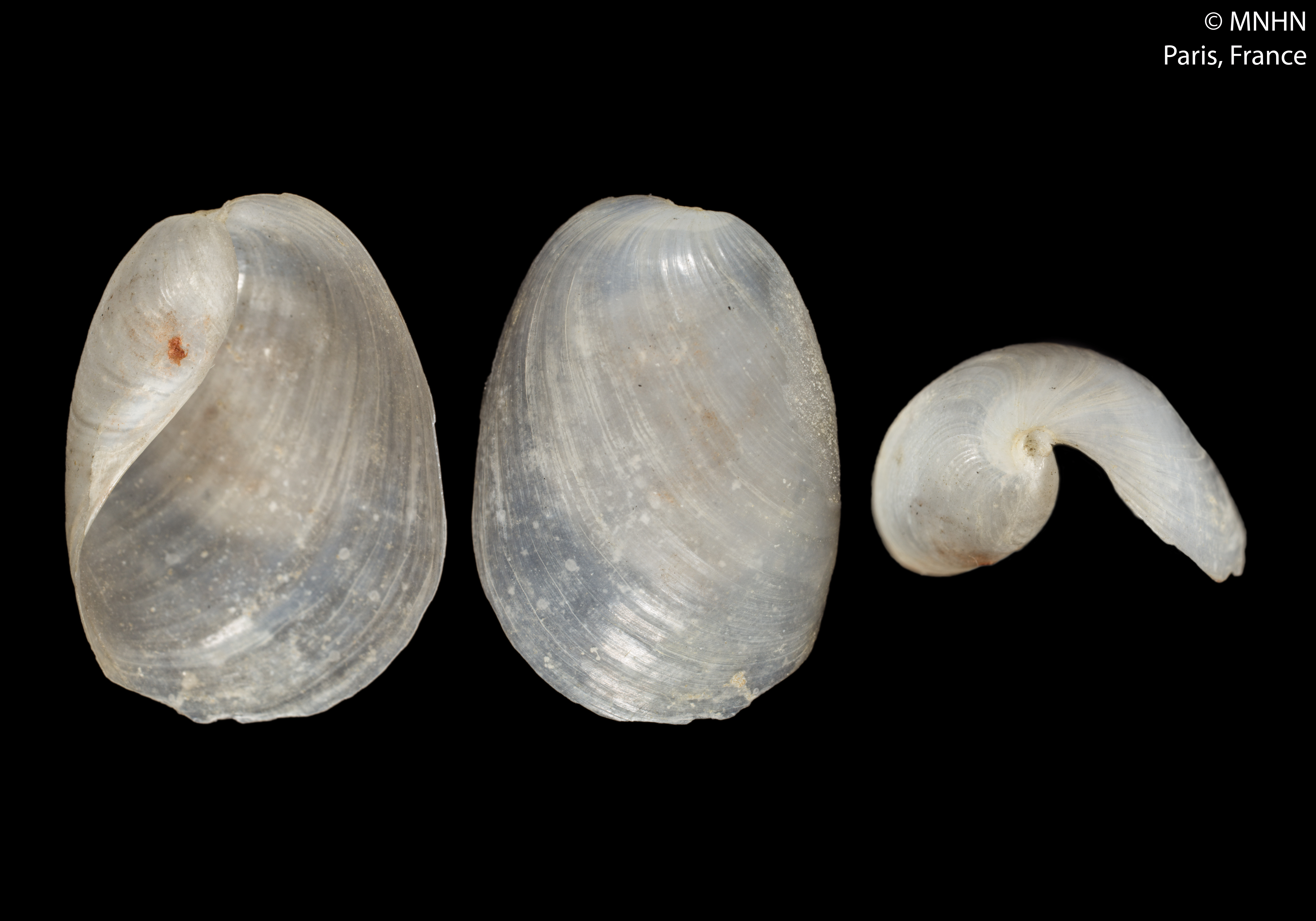

Scientific classification
- Domain: Eukaryota
- Kingdom: Animalia
- Phylum: Mollusca
- Class: Gastropoda
- Family: Philinidae
- Genus: Philine
- Species: P. quadripartita

Binomial name
- Philine quadripartita (Ascanius, 1772)

= Philine quadripartita =

Species of mollusc

Philine quadripartita is a species of sea slugs or sea snails, marine gastropod molluscs that has in recent times been referred to as Philine aperta in the North East Atlantic, but several recent studies studying anatomical traits such as the reproductive anatomy and DNA has shown that P. quadripartita and P. aperta are two distinct species.

P. quadripartita occurs in the NE Atlantic and Mediterranean described from Arendal, Norway, and P. aperta is restricted to the Indian Ocean side of the Cape peninsula of South Africa. The snail has a thin, cone-shaped shell that is typically about 5–7 mm (0.20–0.28 in) in length, with four distinct whorls. Its shell is pale yellow to brown in color, and is covered in small, raised scales. The snail's head and foot are both brown, and it has a small, fleshy mantle that covers the opening of its shell.

There are also two cryptically similar species in SE Atlantic: Philine gueinensis and Philine schrammi.
