= Philine alboides =

Scientific classification
- Kingdom: Animalia
- Phylum: Mollusca
- Class: Gastropoda
- Order: Cephalaspidea
- Family: Philinidae
- Genus: Philine
- Species: P. alboides

Binomial name
- Philine alboides Price, Gosliner & A.Valdés, 2011
- Holotype site: off the east coast of Florida

Species of gastropod

Philine alboides is a species of sea snail, a marine gastropod in the family Philinidae, the headshield slugs. It was first described in 2011 by Rebecca Price, Terrence Gosliner & Ángel A. Valdés.

It has been found off Panama in the Gulf of Mosquitos, in the Gulf of Mexico, and off the east coast of Florida, (all at depths of around 300 m.)
