= Philine wareni =

Scientific classification
- Kingdom: Animalia
- Phylum: Mollusca
- Class: Gastropoda
- Order: Cephalaspidea
- Family: Philinidae
- Genus: Philine
- Species: P. wareni

Binomial name
- Philine wareni A.Valdés, Cadien & Gosliner, 2016
- Holotype site: off the coast of Oregon at depth 786 m.

Species of gastropod

Philine wareni is a species of sea snail, a marine gastropod in the family Philinidae, the headshield slugs. It was first described in 2016 by Ángel A. Valdés, Donald Cadien and Terrence Gosliner.

The species is known only from preserved specimens which were found off the coast of Oregon
