= Philine sarcophaga =

Scientific classification
- Kingdom: Animalia
- Phylum: Mollusca
- Class: Gastropoda
- Order: Cephalaspidea
- Family: Philinidae
- Genus: Philine
- Species: P. sarcophaga

Binomial name
- Philine sarcophaga Price, Gosliner & A.Valdés, 2011
- Paratype site: Indian Ocean off South Africa

Species of gastropod

Philine sarcophaga is a species of sea snail, a marine gastropod in the family Philinidae, the headshield slugs. It was first described in 2011 by Rebecca Price, Terrence Gosliner & Ángel A. Valdés.

The paratype site is in the Indian Ocean off the coast of South Africa, at a depth of about 690 m. It is known only from the Kwazulu Natal coast.

The species epithet, sarcophaga, refers to the coffin - shaped gizzard plate.
