= Hermania (gastropod) =

- Shell of Hermania infantilis (specimen at the Natural History Museum, Rotterdam)

Scientific classification
- Kingdom: Animalia
- Phylum: Mollusca
- Class: Gastropoda
- Order: Cephalaspidea
- Family: Philinidae
- Genus: Hermania; Monterosato, 1884

Synonyms
- Philine (Hermania) Monterosato, 1884 superseded rank

Genus of sea slugs

Hermania is a genus of gastropods belonging to the family Philinidae, and was first described in 1884 by the Italian malacologist, Tommaso Di Maria Allery Monterosato.

== General characteristics ==
(Original description in Italian) These are convoluted species shaped like Scaphander, which have a spiral sculpture of wonderfully intricate texture, consisting of chain-like meshes interspersed with striae. The lower margin of the lip is combed or denticulate, but this character is not common to all the species of this section.

== Distribution ==
The species of this genus are found in Europe, Japan, and more widely across the world.

== Species ==
- Hermania indistincta (Ohnheiser & Malaquias, 2013)
- Hermania infantilis Habe, 1950
- Hermania orca (Gosliner, 1988)
- Hermania rubrata (Gosliner, 1988)
- Hermania scabra (Müller, 1784)
