= Philine habei =

- Philine habei (MNHN-IM-2000-20396)

Scientific classification
- Kingdom: Animalia
- Phylum: Mollusca
- Class: Gastropoda
- Order: Cephalaspidea
- Family: Philinidae
- Genus: Philine
- Species: P. habei

Binomial name
- Philine habei Valdés, 2008
- Holotype site: Fiji

Species of gastropod

Philine habei is a species of sea snail, a marine gastropod in the family Philinidae, the headshield slugs. It was first described in 2008 by Ángel A. Valdés.

The type specimen was collected off Fiji, at a depth of 654–656 m.
