= Philine puka =

Scientific classification
- Kingdom: Animalia
- Phylum: Mollusca
- Class: Gastropoda
- Order: Cephalaspidea
- Family: Philinidae
- Genus: Philine
- Species: P. puka

Binomial name
- Philine puka Price, Gosliner & A.Valdés, 2011
- Holotype site: off O'ahu, Hawaii]]

Species of gastropod

Philine puka is a species of sea snail, a marine gastropod in the family Philinidae, the headshield slugs. It was first described in 2011 by Rebecca Price, Terrence Gosliner & Ángel A. Valdés.

The holotype site is off the coast of Oʻahu, Hawaii.
