= Philine harrisae =

Scientific classification
- Kingdom: Animalia
- Phylum: Mollusca
- Class: Gastropoda
- Order: Cephalaspidea
- Family: Philinidae
- Genus: Philine
- Species: P. harrisae

Binomial name
- Philine harrisae A.Valdés, Cadien & Gosliner, 2016
- Holotype site: off the coast of Oregon at a depth of 2783 m.

Species of gastropod

Philine harrisae is a species of sea snail, a marine gastropod in the family Philinidae, the headshield slugs. It was first described in 2016 by Ángel A. Valdés, Donald Cadien and Terrence Gosliner.

This deep-water species is found off the coast of Oregon, and is known only from preserved specimens. The species epithet honours Leslie Harris.
