= Philine auriformis =

Scientific classification
- Kingdom: Animalia
- Phylum: Mollusca
- Class: Gastropoda
- Family: Philinidae
- Genus: Philine
- Species: P. auriformis

Binomial name
- Philine auriformis Suter, 1909

Species of gastropod

Philine auriformis is a species of sea snail, a marine opisthobranch gastropod mollusk in the family Philinidae, the headshield slugs. Philine auriformis (commonly known as the New Zealand sea slug) eats small clams and worms. This species can grow to be as big as 70 mm but are usually 35 mm in adult size. They live on muddy bottoms in the intertidal zone of bays and estuaries.
