= Philine abyssicola =

- Philine abyssicola (MNHN-IM-2000-20389)

Scientific classification
- Kingdom: Animalia
- Phylum: Mollusca
- Class: Gastropoda
- Order: Cephalaspidea
- Family: Philinidae
- Genus: Philine
- Species: P. abyssicola

Binomial name
- Philine abyssicola A.Valdés, 2008

Species of gastropod

Philine abyssicola is a species of sea snail, a marine gastropod in the family Philinidae, the headshield slugs. It was first described in 2008 by Ángel A. Valdés.

It has been found in deep seas off Fiji.
