= Philine fenestra =

Scientific classification
- Kingdom: Animalia
- Phylum: Mollusca
- Class: Gastropoda
- Order: Cephalaspidea
- Family: Philinidae
- Genus: Philine
- Species: P. fenestra

Binomial name
- Philine fenestra Price, Gosliner & A.Valdés, 2011

Species of gastropod

Philine fenestra is a species of sea snail, a marine gastropod in the family Philinidae, the headshield slugs. It was first described in 2011 by Rebecca Price, Terrence Gosliner & Ángel A. Valdés.

It has been found off the southern coast of South Africa.
