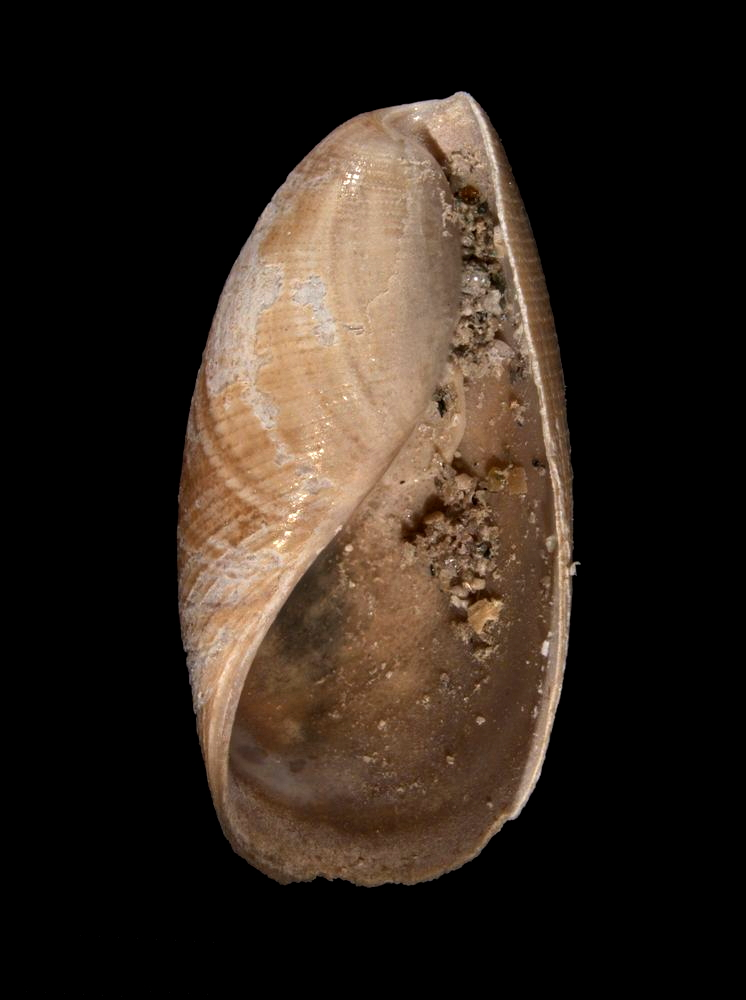
- Shell of Scaphander otagoensis (paratype at the Museum of New Zealand)

Scientific classification
- Kingdom: Animalia
- Phylum: Mollusca
- Class: Gastropoda
- Family: Scaphandridae
- Genus: Scaphander
- Species: S. otagoensis

Binomial name
- Scaphander otagoensis Dell, 1956

= Scaphander otagoensis =

Species of gastropod

Scaphander otagoensis is a species of sea snail, a marine opisthobranch gastropod mollusk in the family Scaphandridae, the canoe bubbles.

== Description ==
The length of the shell attains 39 mm, its diameter 17 mm.

== Distribution ==
This marine species is endemic to New Zealand and occurs off North Island, South Island, and the Chatham Islands, between 360 m and 650 meters.
