= Philine baxteri =

Scientific classification
- Kingdom: Animalia
- Phylum: Mollusca
- Class: Gastropoda
- Order: Cephalaspidea
- Family: Philinidae
- Genus: Philine
- Species: P. baxteri

Binomial name
- Philine baxteri A.Valdés, Cadien & Gosliner, 2016
- Holotype site: Shemya Island, the Aleutians, Alaska at depth 0 m.

Species of gastropod

Philine baxteri is a species of sea snail, a marine gastropod in the family Philinidae, the headshield slugs. It was first described in 2016 by Ángel A. Valdés, Donald Cadien and Terrence Gosliner.

The species is found in the Bering Sea and the Gulf of Alaska, and is known only from preserved specimens. The species epithet hnours Rae Baxter, who collected the majority of the specimens examined when describing this species.
