= Temperamental Artist =

1920 film

- Directed by: Paul Otto
- Written by: Georg Jacoby; Robert Liebmann; Olga Wohlbrück
- Starring: Conrad Veidt; Aud Egede-Nissen; Frida Richard
- Cinematography: Hans Kämpfe
- Production company: Vera-Filmwerke
- Release date: 30 July 1920
- Country: Germany
- Languages: Silent; German intertitles

Temperamental Artist (German: Künstlerlaunen) is a 1920 German silent film directed by Paul Otto and starring Conrad Veidt, Aud Egede-Nissen, and Frida Richard.

== Cast ==
- Gertrud Arnold as General Markoff's wife
- Aud Egede-Nissen as Dagmar, her daughter
- Albert Bozenhard as Prince Warjagin
- Frida Richard as Mrs. Czaslo
- Conrad Veidt as Arpad, her child
- Alfred Haase as Bela, her child
- Philine Tormin as Marika, her child
- Ludwig Max as Anton, servant

== Bibliography ==
- Bock, Hans-Michael; Bergfelder, Tim, eds. (2009). The Concise Cinegraph: Encyclopaedia of German Cinema. New York: Berghahn Books. ISBN 978-1-57181-655-9.
