= Philine babai =

- Philine babai (MNHN-IM-2000-20394)

Scientific classification
- Kingdom: Animalia
- Phylum: Mollusca
- Class: Gastropoda
- Order: Cephalaspidea
- Family: Philinidae
- Genus: Philine
- Species: P. babai

Binomial name
- Philine babai A.Valdés, 2008

Species of gastropod

Philine babai is a species of sea snail, a marine gastropod in the family Philinidae, the headshield slugs. It was first described in 2008 by Ángel A. Valdés.

It has been found in seas off Western Australia, Papua New Guinea, and islands of the South Pacific.
