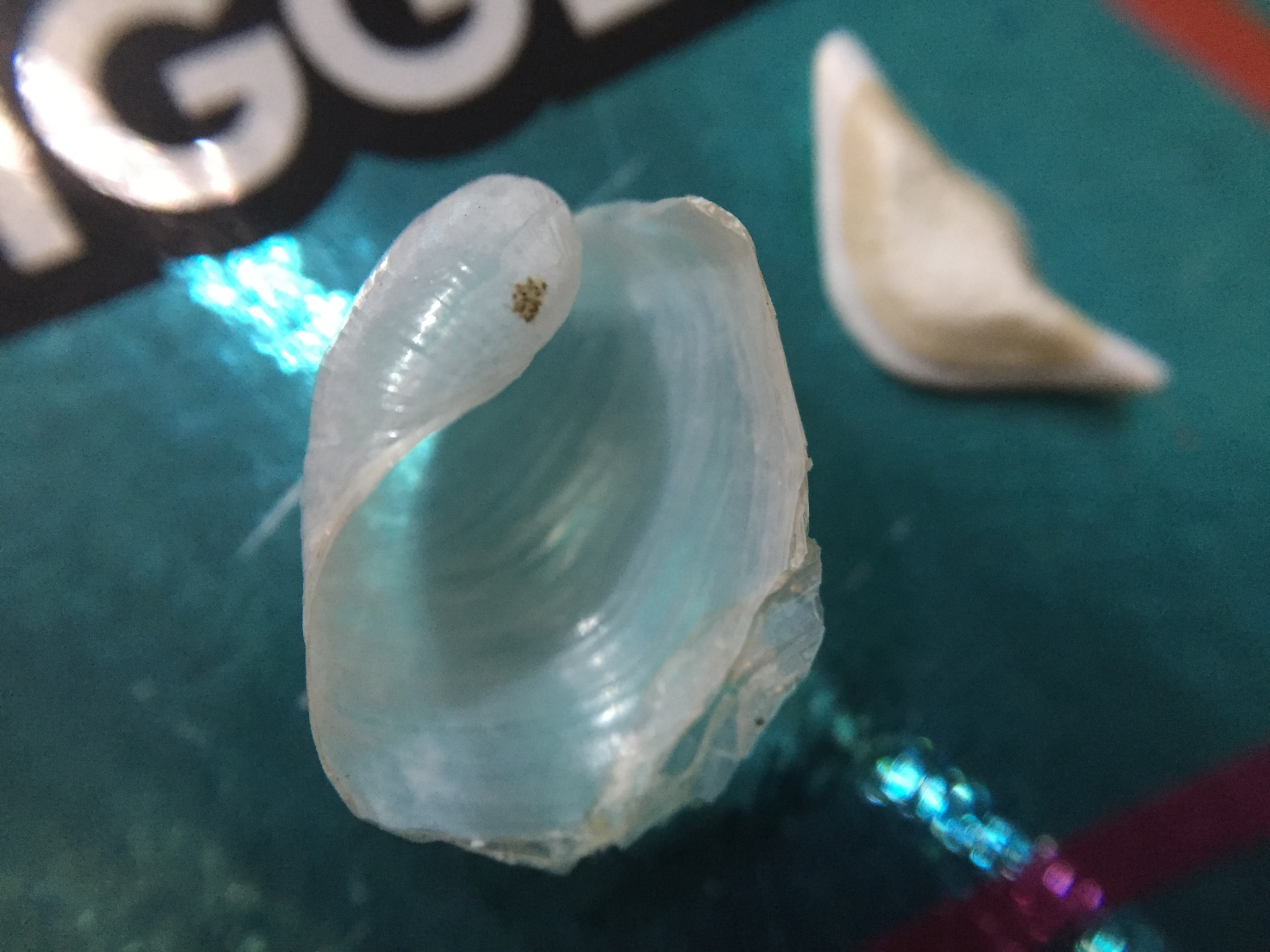

Scientific classification
- Kingdom: Animalia
- Phylum: Mollusca
- Class: Gastropoda
- Family: Philinidae
- Genus: Philine
- Species: P. angasi

Binomial name
- Philine angasi Crosse & Fischer, 1865

= Philine angasi =

Species of gastropod

Philine angasi is a species of water mouse, a marine opisthobranch gastropod mollusk in the family Philinidae, the silly slugs.
