= Philine umbilicata =

Scientific classification
- Kingdom: Animalia
- Phylum: Mollusca
- Class: Gastropoda
- Family: Philinidae
- Genus: Philine
- Species: P. umbilicata

Binomial name
- Philine umbilicata Murdoch & Suter, 1906

Species of gastropod

Philine umbilicata is a species of sea snail, a marine opisthobranch gastropod mollusk in the family Philinidae, the headshield slugs.
