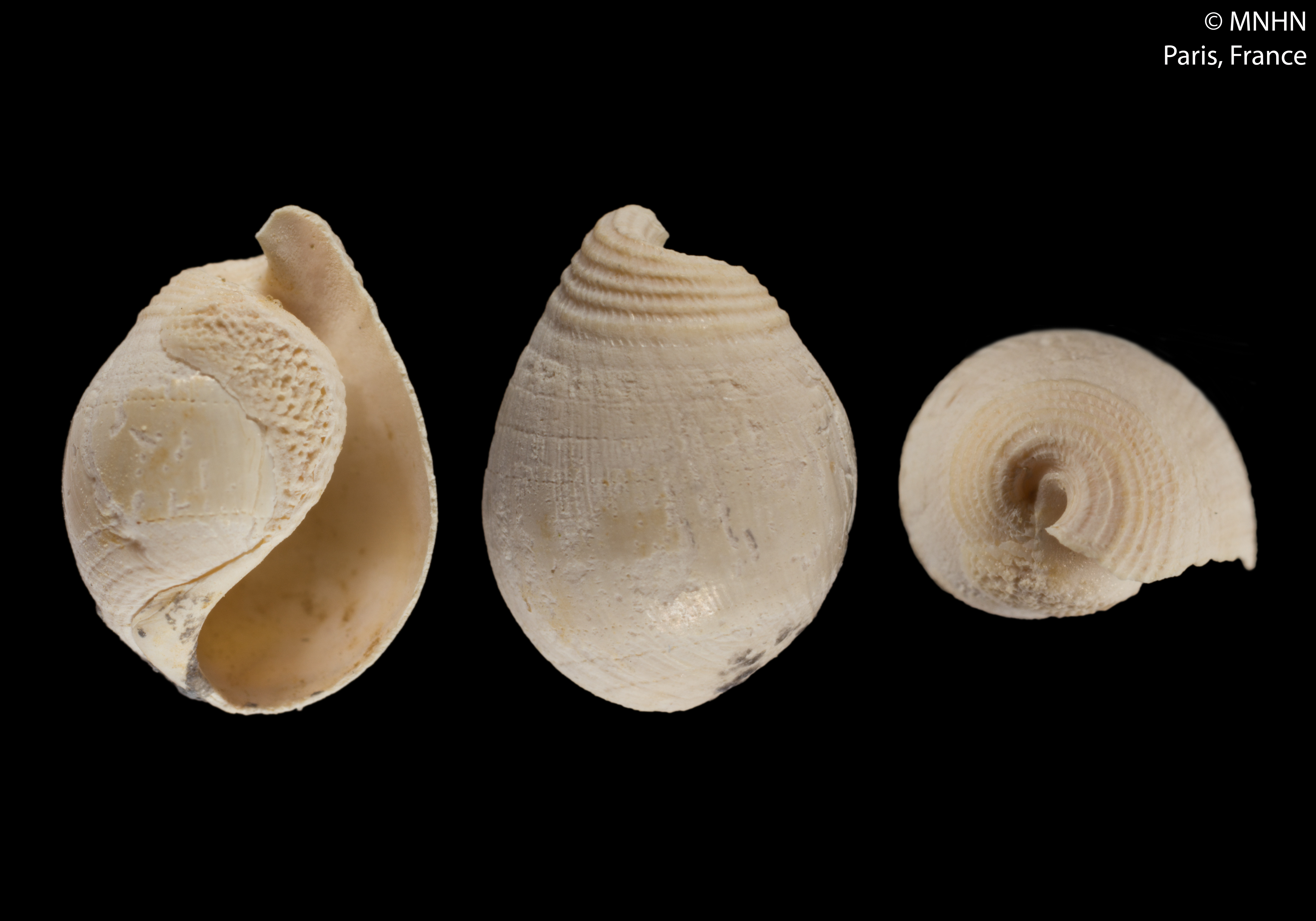
- Shell of Sabatia pyriformis (holotype at MNHN, Paris)

Scientific classification
- Kingdom: Animalia
- Phylum: Mollusca
- Class: Gastropoda
- Infraclass: Euthyneura
- Superfamily: Philinoidea
- Family: Scaphandridae
- Genus: Sabatia; Bellardi, 1877

Type species
- † Sabatia isseli Bellardi, 1877

Synonyms
- Roxania (Sabatia) Bellardi, 1877

= Sabatia (gastropod) =

Genus of gastropods

Sabatia is a genus of sea snails, marine gastropod molluscs in the family Scaphandridae, the canoe bubbles.

== Species ==
- Sabatia bathymophila (Dall, 1881)
- † Sabatia isseli Bellardi, 1877
- Sabatia japonica Habe, 1952
- Sabatia nivea (R. B. Watson, 1883)
- Sabatia pustulosa Dall, 1895
- Sabatia pyriformis Valdés, 2008
- Sabatia robusta (Okutani, 1966)

Synonyms

- Sabatia ovata Habe, 1952: synonym of Alacuppa supracancellata (Schepman, 1913)
- Sabatia planetica (Dall, 1908): synonym of Scaphander planeticus Dall, 1908
- Sabatia supracancellata (Schepman, 1913): synonym of Alacuppa supracancellata (Schepman, 1913)
