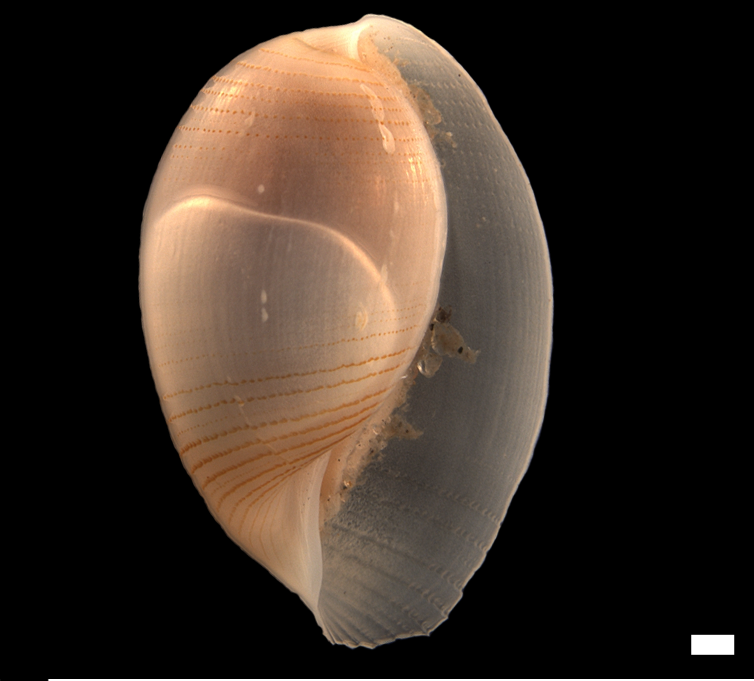
- Roxania utriculus

Scientific classification
- Kingdom: Animalia
- Phylum: Mollusca
- Class: Gastropoda
- Infraclass: Euthyneura
- Superfamily: Philinoidea
- Family: Scaphandridae
- Genus: Roxania; Leach, 1847

Synonyms
- †Abderospira Dall, 1896; Atys (Roxania); Bulla (Leucophysema) Dall, 1908; † Bullina (Abderospira) Dall, 1896; Damoniella Iredale, 1918; Leucophysema Dall, 1908; Roscania Leach, 1852; Roxania J E Gray, 1847; Scaphander (Roxania)

= Roxania =

Genus of gastropods

Roxania is a genus of gastropods belonging to the family Alacuppidae.

The genus has an almost cosmopolitan distribution.

Species:

- Roxania aequatorialis Thiele, 1925
- †Roxania alpha (Mestayer, 1921)
- Roxania argoblysis (Rehder & Ladd, 1973)
- †Roxania chipolana (Dall, 1896)
- Roxania eburneola (Dall, 1927)
- Roxania japonica (Habe, 1976)
- Roxania lithensis (Sturany, 1903)
- Roxania mediolaevigata Traub, 1938
- Roxania modesta Traub, 1938
- Roxania monterosatoi Dautzenberg & H.Fischer, 1896
- Roxania morgana (Dall, 1908)
- Roxania pinguicula (G.Seguenza, 1880)
- Roxania pseudosemistriata Eames, 1952
- Roxania semilaevis (G.Seguenza, 1880)
- Roxania simillima Thiele, 1925
- Roxania smithae Valdés, 2008
- Roxania utriculus (Brocchi, 1814)
- Roxania ventricosa Traub, 1938

Synonyms

- Roxania pacifica (Habe, 1956): synonym of Mimatys pacifica (Habe, 1956)
- Roxania punctulata (A. Adams, 1862): synonym of Mimatys punctulatus (A. Adams, 1862)
- Roxania subrotunda Monterosato, 1890: synonym of Roxania pinguicula (G. Seguenza, 1880)
- Roxania umbilicata (Habe, 1956): synonym of Mimatys umbilicatus (Habe, 1956)
