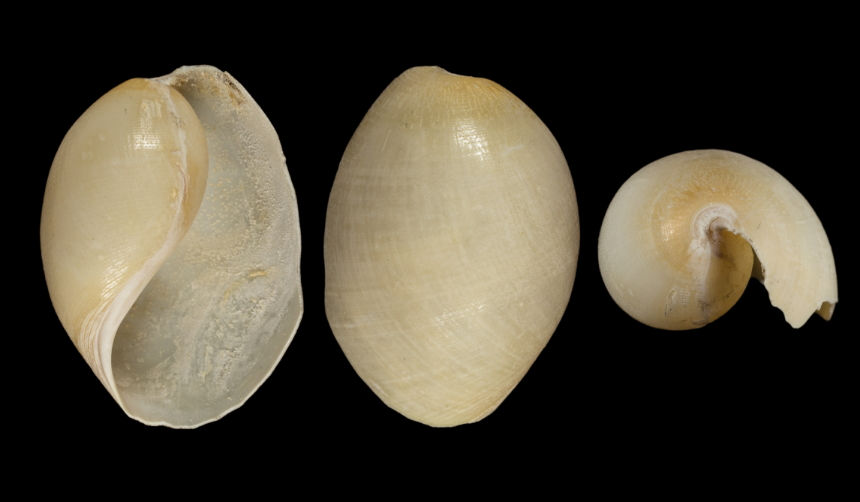
- Shell of Scaphander punctostriatus (syntype in the MNHN, Paris)

Scientific classification
- Kingdom: Animalia
- Phylum: Mollusca
- Class: Gastropoda
- Family: Scaphandridae
- Genus: Scaphander
- Species: S. punctostriatus

Binomial name
- Scaphander punctostriatus (Mighels & C. B. Adams, 1842

Synonyms
- Bulla inesperata Locard, 1897 junior subjective synonym; Bulla punctostriata Mighels & C. B. Adams, 1842; Cryptaxis crebripunctatus Jeffreys, 1883; Scaphander librarius Lovén, 1846; Scaphander punctostriatus var. elongata Locard, 1897; Scaphander punctostriatus var. inflata Locard, 1897; Scaphander punctostriatus var. intermedia Locard, 1897

= Scaphander punctostriatus =

Species of gastropod

Scaphander punctostriatus, common name the giant canoe bubble, is a species of sea snail, a marine opisthobranch gastropod mollusk in the family Scaphandridae, the canoe bubbles.

== Description ==
The length of the shell varies between 30 mm and 40 mm.

The shell is elongate, thin, and somewhat bubble-like, with a fragile structure. There is no evident spire, as the body whorl expands rapidly, covering the earlier whorls. The surface appears smooth but, under a microscope, reveals fine spiral lines of tiny, elongated pits (punctations). The aperture is elongated and very broad at the base. The animal is large and cannot fully retract into the shell.

The shell is whitish, covered by a thin yellowish periostracum, and occasionally displays faint, darker spiral bands. The animal itself is yellowish-white.

== Distribution ==
This marine species occurs widely in the North Atlantic, Gulf of Mexico, and Mediterranean. Off South Africa it is found on the outer continental shelf and upper slope along the West Coast and Agulhas Bank, at depths of 170–2700 meters.
