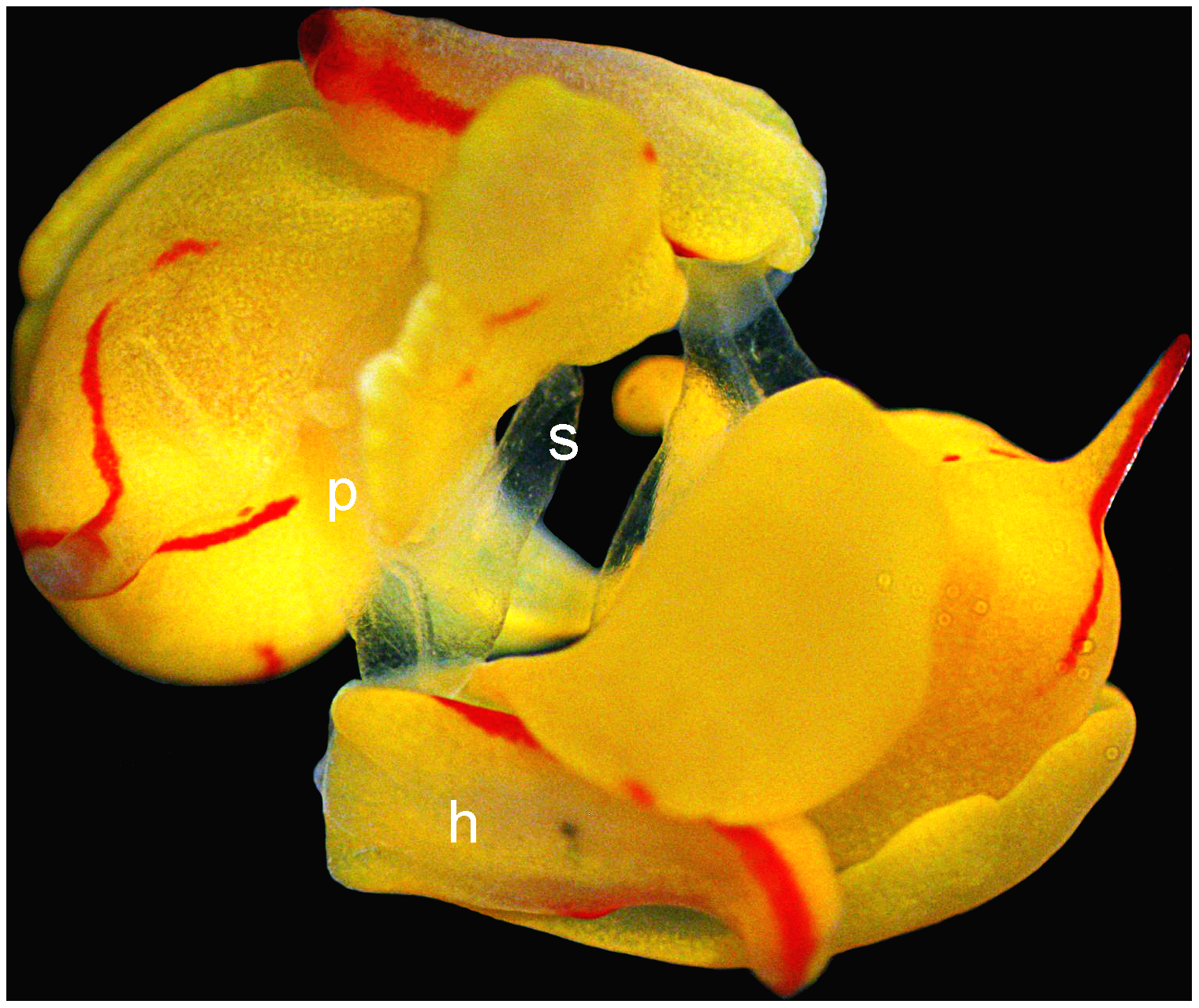
- Mating pair of Siphopteron quadrispinosum

Scientific classification
- Kingdom: Animalia
- Phylum: Mollusca
- Class: Gastropoda
- Superfamily: Philinoidea
- Family: Gastropteridae; Swainson, 1840

Synonyms
- Gasteropteridae (misspelling)

= Gastropteridae =

Family of gastropods

Gastropteridae, the bat-winged slugs, is a family of sea slugs, gastropod molluscs in the superfamily Philinoidea of the clade Cephalaspidea, the headshield slugs and bubble snails. The greatest diversity of these colourful small slugs is in the tropical and sub-tropical Indo-Pacific region.

== Description ==
Gastropteridae is a fairly diverse family containing four genera and thirty-three described species. Adults have an internal reduced shell or no shell at all. The body is fairly short, usually under 10 mm (0.4 in) in length, but exceptionally up to 35 mm (1.4 in). Compared to the closely related philinids and the aglajids, the mantle cavity is small, and the gills are located further forward, in an exposed position. In most species, the hind end of the headshield is narrowed, raised and curved forward, sometimes being further forward than the front edge of the head. A radula is present, but no jaws. These slugs are mostly brightly coloured and distinctively patterned.

Gastropterids have parapodia (large outgrowths from the mantle wall) and can swim by flapping these, which has led to them being referred to as "bat-winged slugs". The nervous system has a well-developed brain and these slugs exhibit various elaborate behavioural traits.

== Distribution and habitat ==
Most gastropterids are found in the tropical and sub-tropical parts of the Indo-Pacific region. Most species have been described since the middle of the twentieth century and there are many undescribed species. Gastropteron is the only genus with a presence in the Atlantic Ocean.

== Ecology ==
The ecology of gastropterids has been little studied, but most Sagaminopteron species have been observed to feed on sponges that do not contain spicules. At least some Siphopteron species are found on macroalgae and seagrasses.

Gastroperids are simultaneous hermaphrodites. Siphopteron species have a complex mating behaviour, with each of two slugs attempting to use spines for hypodermic insemination of the other one. This is the case in Siphopteron quadrispinosum, where each slug attempts to inject prostate fluid into the other having stabbed it with a stylet, part of a two-pronged penis. The two slugs circle clockwise around each other, each probing and attempting to pierce the underside of the other with the stylet while avoiding getting pierced itself. When one or both is successful, the penis is thrust into the other slug's gonopore, where further spines hold it in place, and mating takes place. Copulation may be reciprocal or only one slug may be successful.

== Genera ==
The following genera are recognised by the World Register of Marine Species:

- Enotepteron Minichev, 1967
- Gastropteron Kosse, 1813 - synonym: Sarcopterus Rafinesque, 1814
- Sagaminopteron Tokioka & Baba, 1964
- Siphopteron Gosliner, 1989
