= Philine mcleani =

Scientific classification
- Kingdom: Animalia
- Phylum: Mollusca
- Class: Gastropoda
- Order: Cephalaspidea
- Family: Philinidae
- Genus: Philine
- Species: P. mcleani

Binomial name
- Philine mcleani A.Valdés, Cadien & Gosliner, 2016
- Holotype site: Beaufort Sea, Arctic Ocean at a depth of 48 m.

Species of gastropod

Philine mcleani is a species of sea snail, a marine gastropod in the family Philinidae. It was first described in 2016 by Ángel A. Valdés, Donald Cadien and Terrence Gosliner.

The species is found in the Beaufort Sea of the Arctic Ocean, at depths of ranging from 16 to 575 m., and is known only from preserved specimens. The species epithet honours James H. McLean.
