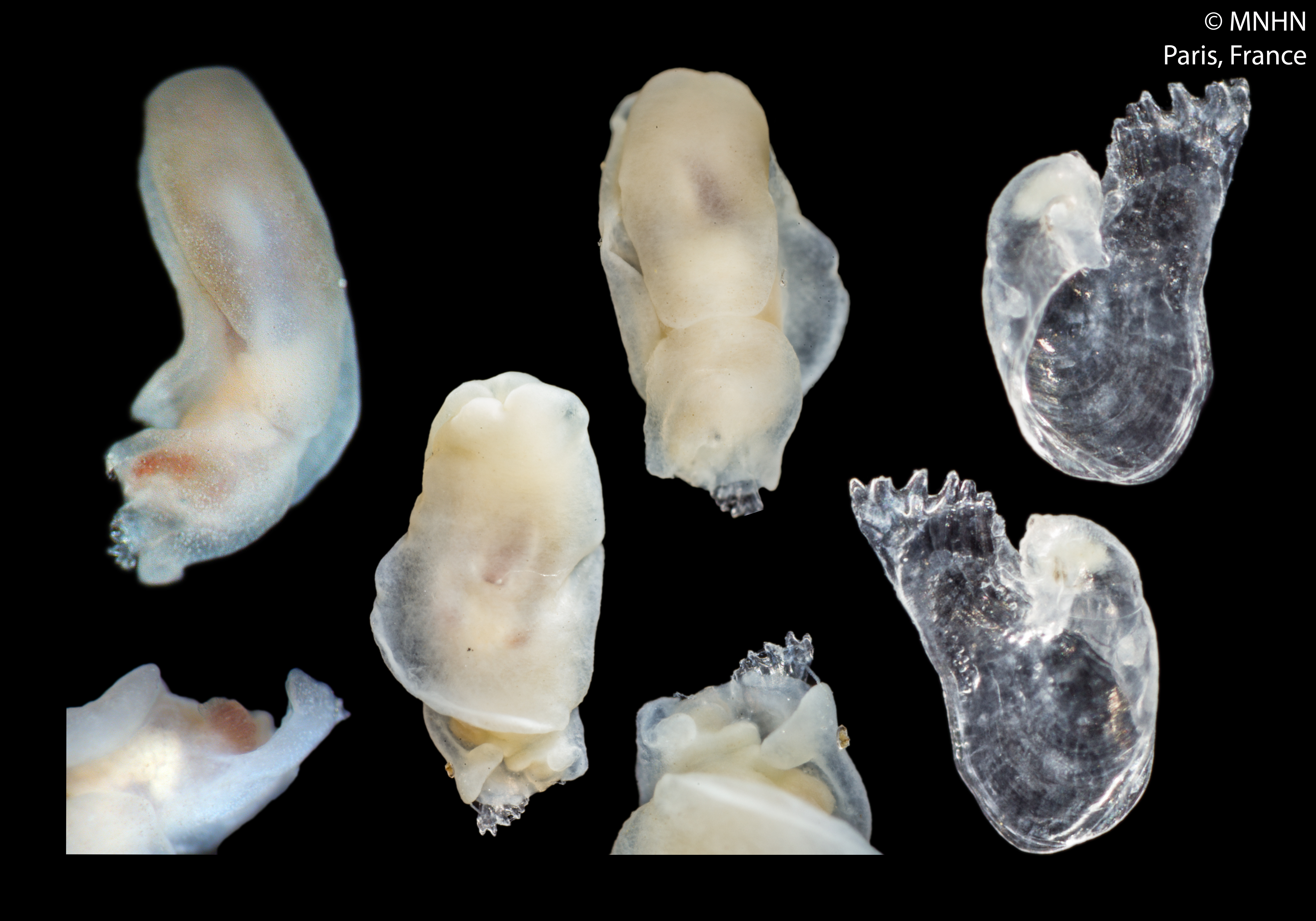
- Shell of Spiniphiline persei (holotype at MNHN, Paris)

Scientific classification
- Kingdom: Animalia
- Phylum: Mollusca
- Class: Gastropoda
- Family: Philinidae
- Genus: Spiniphiline; Gosliner, 1988

Type species
- Spiniphiline kensleyi Gosliner, 1988

= Spiniphiline =

Genus of gastropods

Spiniphiline is a genus of marine gastropods belonging to subfamily Hermaniinae of the family Philinidae.

== Species ==
- Spiniphiline caboverdensis Malaquias, Ohnheiser, Oskars & Willassen, 2016
- Spiniphiline kensleyi Gosliner, 1988
- Spiniphiline persei Caballer & Ortea, 2015
- Spiniphiline richardsoni Swinnen, 2021
- Spiniphiline verbinneni Swinnen, 2021
