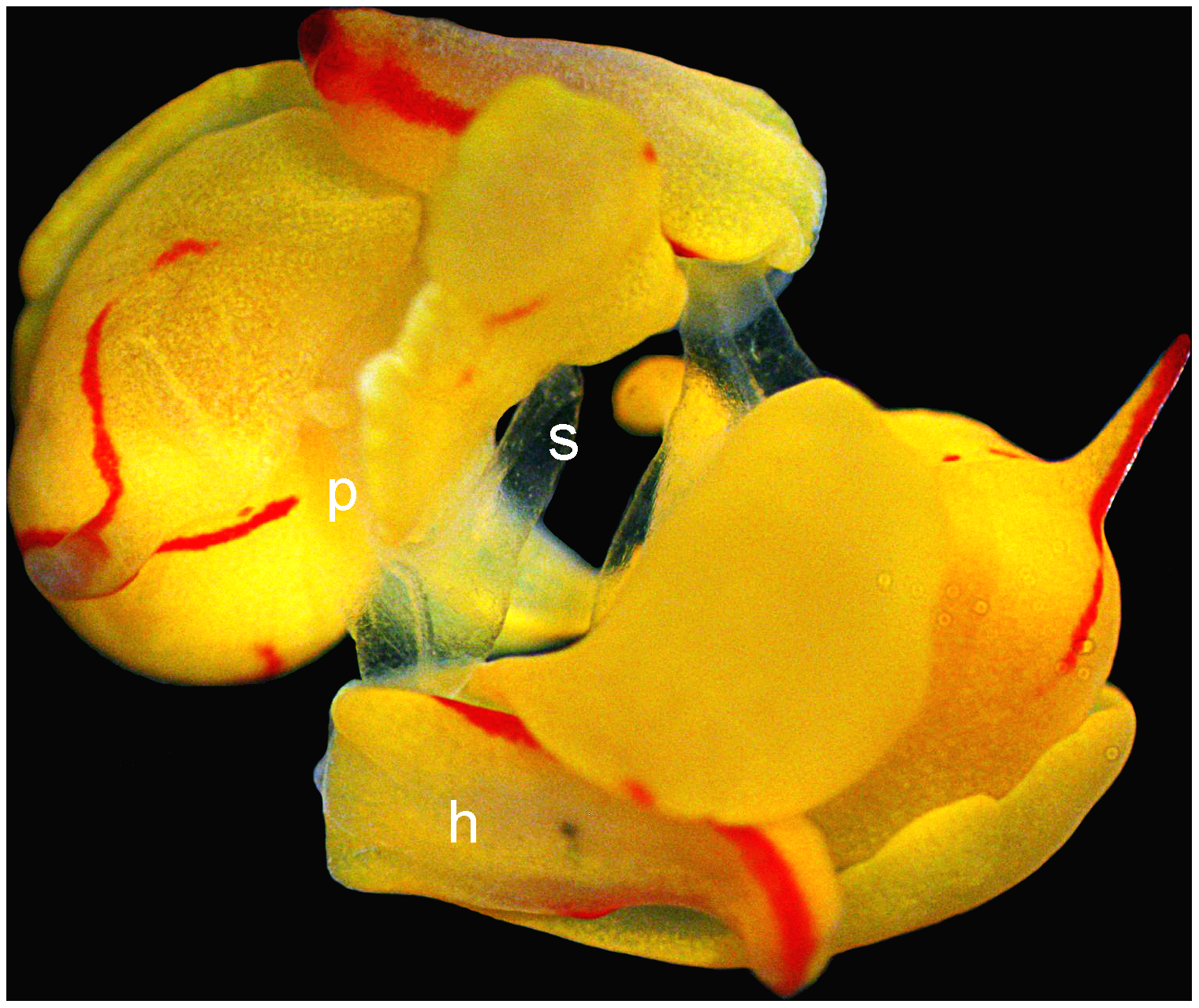
- Reciprocal copulation of Siphopteron quadrispinosum

Scientific classification
- Kingdom: Animalia
- Phylum: Mollusca
- Class: Gastropoda
- Family: Gastropteridae
- Genus: Siphopteron
- Species: S. quadrispinosum

Binomial name
- Siphopteron quadrispinosum Gosliner, 1989

= Siphopteron quadrispinosum =

Species of gastropod

Siphopteron quadrispinosum is a species of small sea slug, a marine opisthobranch gastropod mollusc in the order Cephalaspidea, the headshield slugs. This slug is a simultaneous hermaphrodite.

== Distribution ==
This species was originally identified in Hawaii (Kihei, Maui) and Papua New Guinea, and has a wide distribution throughout the western and central Pacific Ocean.

== Description ==
Siphopteron quadrispinosum is a relatively small species of sea slug, growing to a maximum length of 5 mm (0.20 in). The body is bright yellow, and the siphon is orange-red in colour. The parapodia and siphon differ between the Papua New Guinean and Haiwaiian populations. Papua New Guinean specimens have the colouration of the siphon continuing along the posterior shield. Also, the parapodia are entirely yellow. In Hawaiian populations, the parapodia have a white margin and the orange-red colouration along the posterior shield is absent.

Eggs of this species are pale yellow and are laid in a flattened mass.

== Habitat ==
Siphopteron quadrispinosum lives at depths of 6 to 27 metres (20 to 89 ft) on sand beds, and among Halimeda kanaloana, a species of macroalgae.

== Behaviour ==
This slug can swim, and will do so when disturbed. It is active during the daytime.

=== Mating ===
Siphopteron quadrispinosum is a simultaneous hermaphrodite. During mating, each animal stabs the other with a penile stylet, a form of penile appendage, and injects prostate fluids.
