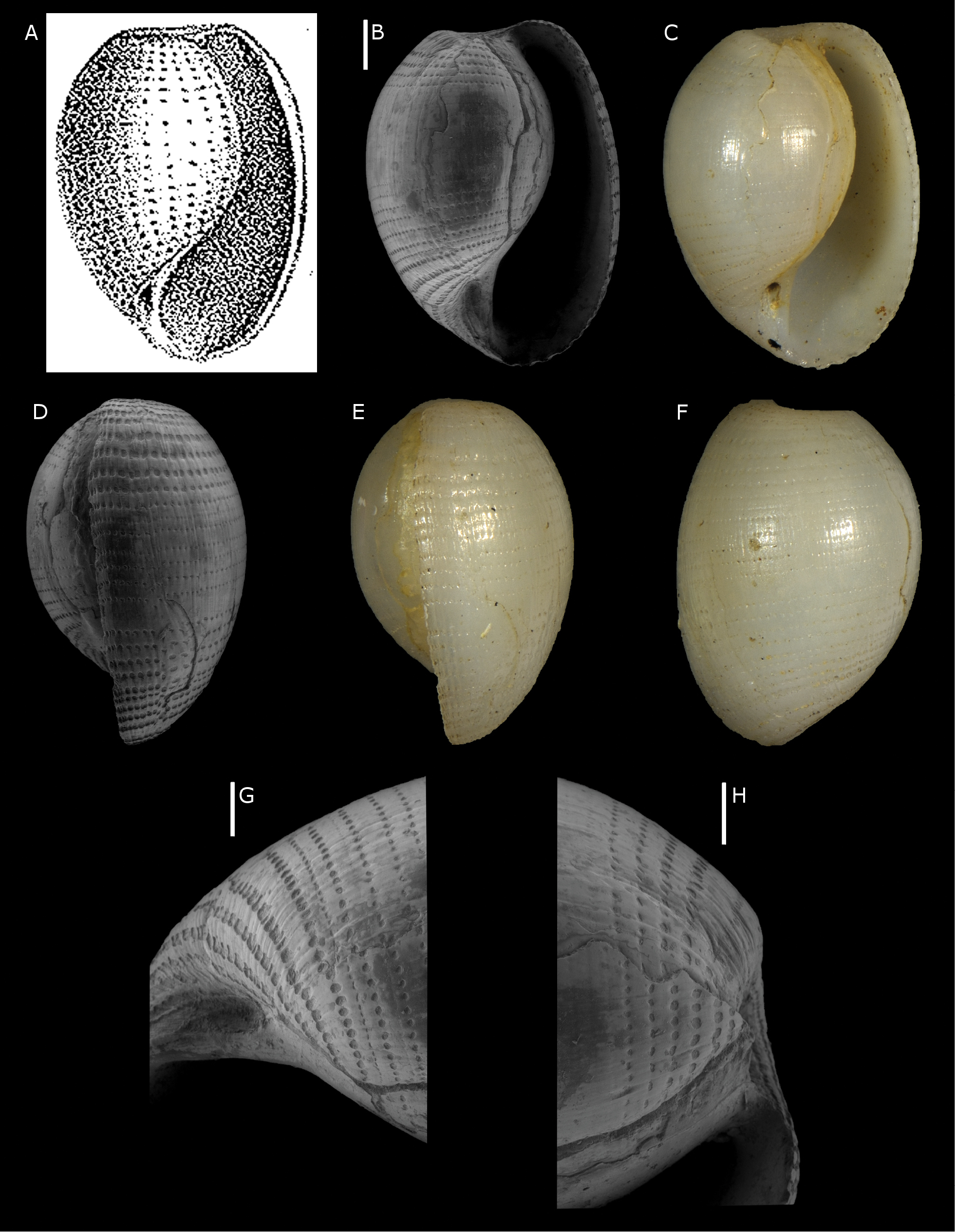
- Shell of Roxania lithensis

Scientific classification
- Kingdom: Animalia
- Phylum: Mollusca
- Class: Gastropoda
- Subclass: Heterobranchia
- Infraclass: Euthyneura
- Superfamily: Philinoidea
- Family: Alacuppidae; Oskars, Bouchet & Malaquias, 2015

Genera
- See text

= Alacuppidae =

Family of gastropods

Alacuppidae is a family of often colorful, medium-sized, sea slugs, marine opisthobranch gastropod mollusks.

== Genera ==
- Alacuppa Oskars, Bouchet & Malaquias, 2015
- Mimatys Habe, 1952
- Roxania Leach, 1847

Synonyms

- † Abderospira Dall, 1896: synonym of Roxania Leach, 1847
- Leucophysema Dall, 1908: synonym of Roxania Leach, 1847
