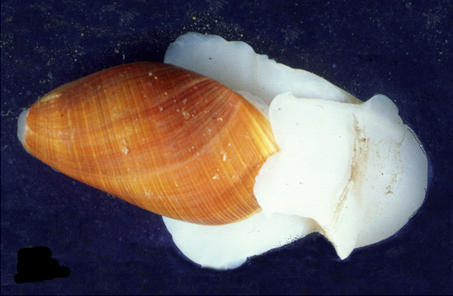
- Live animal, head end towards the right

Scientific classification
- Kingdom: Animalia
- Phylum: Mollusca
- Class: Gastropoda
- Family: Scaphandridae
- Genus: Scaphander
- Species: S. lignarius

Binomial name
- Scaphander lignarius (Linnaeus, 1767)

Synonyms
- Assula convoluta Schumacher, 1817; Bulla lignaria Linnaeus, 1758 (basionym)

= Scaphander lignarius =

Woody canoe-bubble

Species of gastropod

Scaphander lignarius, common name the woody canoe-bubble, is a species of sea snail, a bubble snail, a marine opisthobranch gastropod mollusk in the family Scaphandridae, the canoe-bubbles.

== Distribution ==
This species is found in European waters and in the Mediterranean Sea.

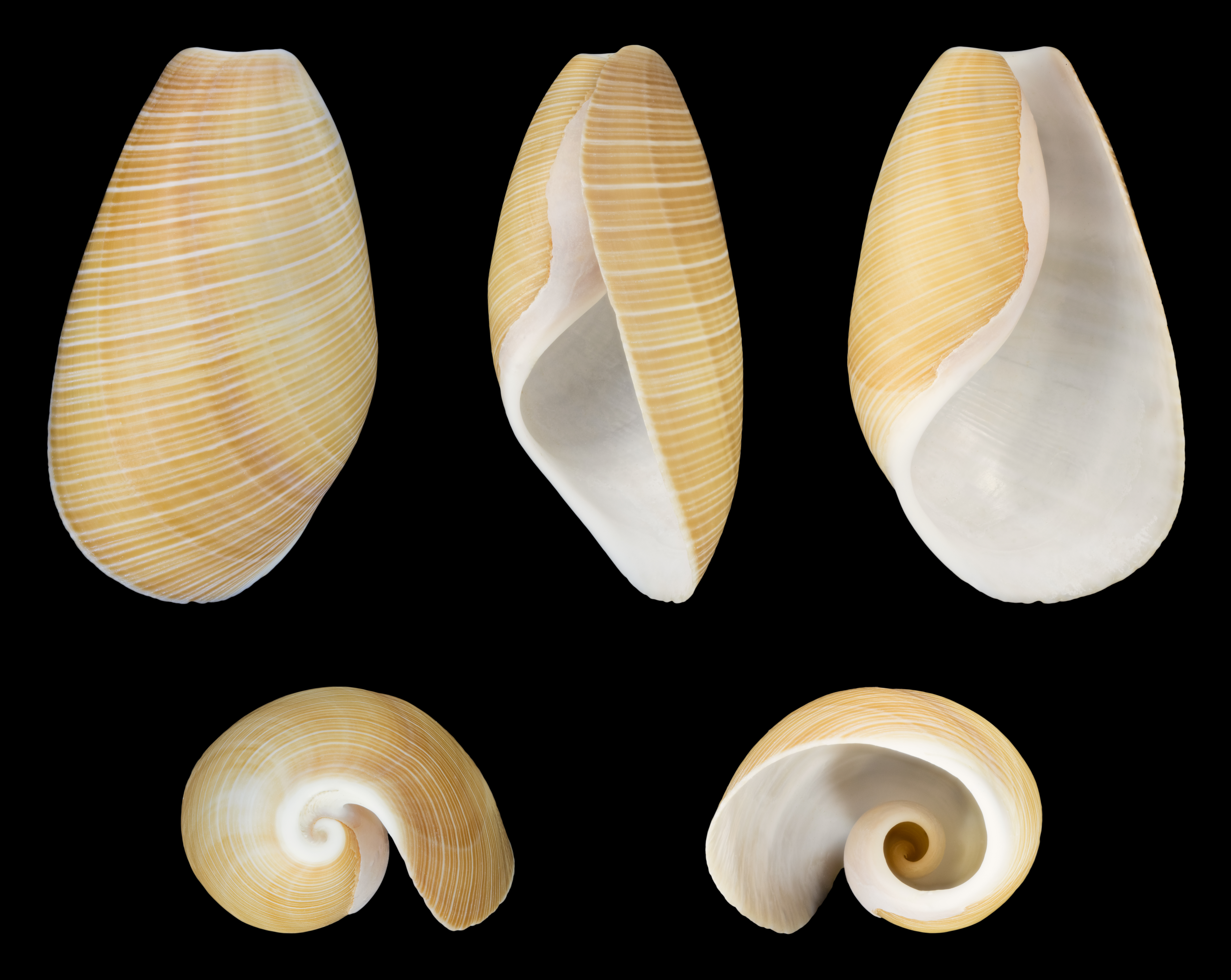
