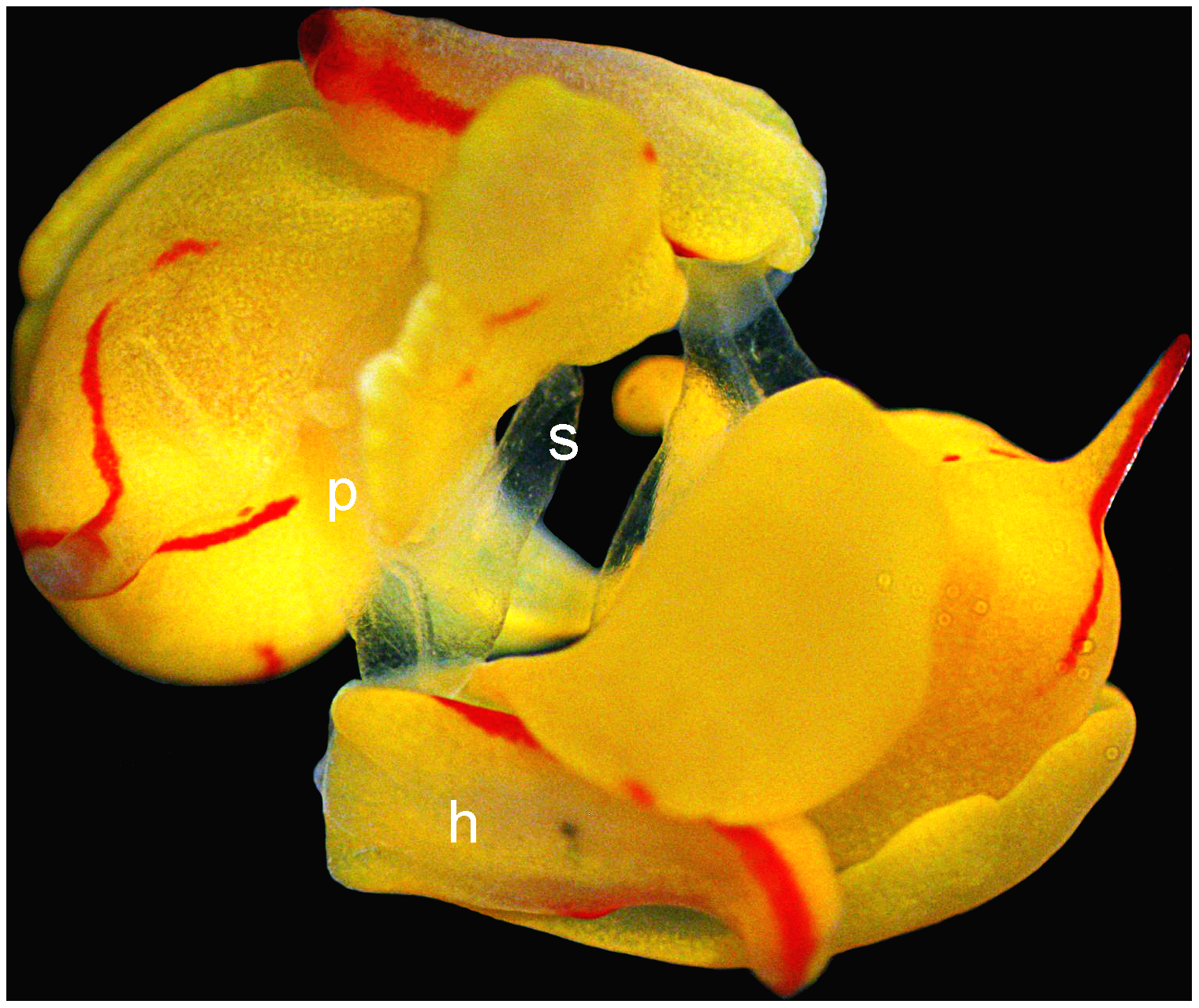
- mating of Siphopteron quadrispinosum

Scientific classification
- Kingdom: Animalia
- Phylum: Mollusca
- Class: Gastropoda
- Family: Gastropteridae
- Genus: Siphopteron; Gosliner, 1989

= Siphopteron =

Genus of gastropods

Siphopteron is a genus of sea slugs, marine gastropod molluscs in the family Gastropteridae.

== Species ==
Species within the genus Siphopteron include:

- Siphopteron alboaurantium (Gosliner, 1984)
- Siphopteron brunneomarginatum (Carlson & Hoff, 1974)
- Siphopteron citrinum (Carlson & Hoff, 1974)
- Siphopteron flavobrunneum (Gosliner, 1984)
- Siphopteron flavum (Tokioka & Baba, 1964)
- Siphopteron fuscum (Baba & Tokioka, 1965)
- Siphopteron ladrones (Carlson & Hoff, 1974)
- Siphopteron leah Klussmann-Kolb & Klussmann, 2003
- Siphopteron michaeli (Gosliner & Williams, 1988)
- Siphopteron nigromarginatum Gosliner, 1989
- Siphopteron pohnpei (Hoff & Carlson, 1983)
- Siphopteron quadrispinosum Gosliner, 1989
- Siphopteron tigrinum Gosliner, 1989
- Siphopteron sp. 1
