= Hermania orca =

Scientific classification
- Kingdom: Animalia
- Phylum: Mollusca
- Class: Gastropoda
- Order: Cephalaspidea
- Family: Philinidae
- Genus: Hermania
- Species: H. orca

Binomial name
- Hermania orca (Gosliner, 1988)
- Type sites

Synonyms
- Philine orca Gosliner, 1988

Species of gastropod

Hermania orca is a species of gastropod belonging to the family Philinidae. The species was first described in 1988 as Philine orca by Terrence Gosliner In 2023 Gosliner assigned it to the genus, Hermania.

The species is found widely across both the Indian Ocean and the Pacific, with the type specimens being found in the Seychelles and off Papua New Guinea and Hawaii.

Its English common name is Orca Folded Bubble Snail, while its Japanese name is モンガラキセワタ, and its Korean name is 투명점줄작은민챙이.
