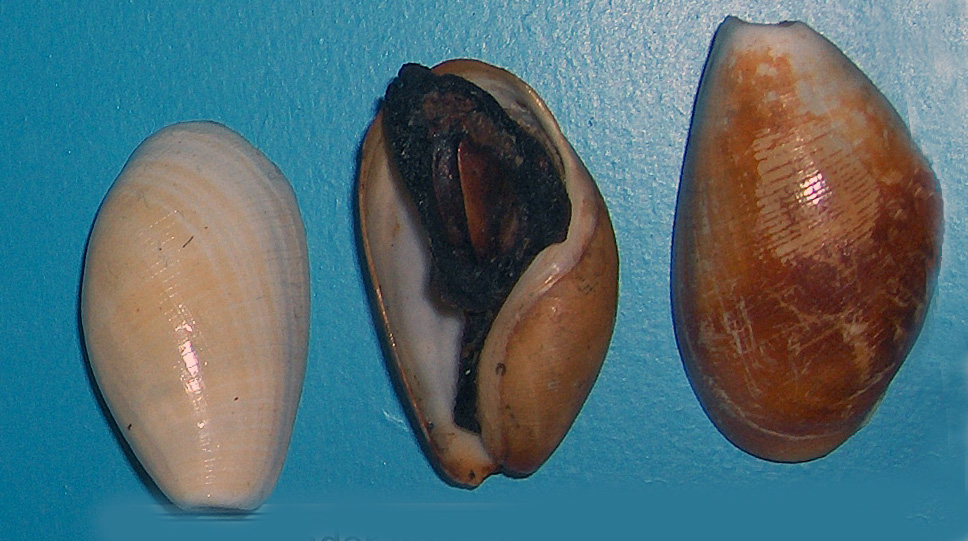
- Three preserved specimens of Scaphander lignarius, from left to right, the anterior, anterior, and posterior ends are at the top of the image

Scientific classification
- Kingdom: Animalia
- Phylum: Mollusca
- Class: Gastropoda
- Order: Cephalaspidea
- Superfamily: Philinoidea
- Family: Scaphandridae
- Genus: Scaphander; Linnaeus, 1758

Type species
- Bulla lignaria Linnaeus, 1758

Synonyms
- Assula Schumacher, 1817; Brocktonia Iredale, 1915 (junior subjective synonym); Bucconia Dall, 1890; Bulla (Bullocardia) F. Nordsieck, 1972; Bulla (Scaphander) Montfort, 1810 (superseded combination); Gioenia Bruguière, 1789 unavailable name (suppressed by ICZN Opinion 287); Meloscaphander Schepman, 1913 ·; Scaphander (Bucconia) Dall, 1890; Scaphander (Sabatina) Dall, 1908; Tricla Philippson, 1788 (Invalid: Placed on the Official Index by ICZN Opinion 287)

= Scaphander =

Genus of gastropods

Scaphander is a genus of sea snails, marine gastropod molluscs in the family Scaphandridae, the canoe bubbles.

== Description ==
(Described as Meloscaphander) The shell is ovate, convex in its upper part, and tapers below, with a low, slightly exserted spire. The aperture is large but shorter than the shell, and the columella is moderately curved and thick. The surface is sculpted with rows of spiral pits.

(Described as Scaphander (Sabatina) ) In most, if not all, species of this proposed subgenus, the callosity on the body does not form a distinct "fold." Instead, it appears as an amorphous mass, which sometimes may be granular, smooth, or occasionally tubercular in texture. While the typical fossil species seems to have an interiorly produced callus, the recent species differ notably from Bellardi’s fossil. They not only lack the same callus characteristics but also exhibit a globose shell shape rather than the pyriform shape seen in the fossil. For these globose recent species, I propose the name Sabatina, with Scaphander sabatina planeticus Dall, 1908 as the type. These species possess an animal capable of fully retracting into the shell, with gastroliths identical to those found in Scaphander lignarius.

== Species ==
Species within the genus Scaphander include:

- Scaphander amygdalus Siegwald & Malaquias, 2024
- Scaphander andamanicus E. A. Smith, 1894
- † Scaphander brevicula Philippi 1887
- Scaphander cancellatus E. von Martens, 1902
- † Scaphander cauveti (de Raincourt, 1885)
- Scaphander ceylanus E. A. Smith, 1904 (uncertain)
- Scaphander clavus Dall, 1889
- † Scaphander conicus (Deshayes, 1824)
- Scaphander cornus Siegwald & Malaquias, 2024
- Scaphander darius Marcus & Marcus, 1967
- † Scaphander dertonensis (Sacco, 1896)
- Scaphander dilatatus A. Adams, 1862 (nomen dubium)
- † Scaphander elegans (K. Martin, 1879)
- Scaphander elongatus A. Adams, 1862 (nomen dubium)
- † Scaphander enysi (Hutton, 1873)
- † Scaphander flemingi Marwick, 1965
- Scaphander gracilis Watson, 1886
- Scaphander grandis (Minichev, 1967)
- † Scaphander hiulcus Laws, 1936
- † Scaphander ickeiK. Martin, 1914
- Scaphander illecebrosus Iredale, 1925
- Scaphander imperceptus (Bouchet, 1975)
- Scaphander impunctatus Hickman 1980
- Scaphander interruptus Dall, 1889
- † Scaphander javana Martin 1879
- † Scaphander jugularis (Conrad, 1855)
- † Scaphander komiticus Laws, 1939
- Scaphander laetus Thiele, 1925 (taxon inquirendum)
- † Scaphander langdoni Dall, 1896 (unassessed)
- Scaphander lignarius (Linnaeus, 1767)
- Scaphander lignarius lignarius (Linnaeus, 1758) - wood-grained canoe bubble
- † Scaphander malleatus Marwick, 1931
- Scaphander meridionalis Siegwald, Pastorino, Oskars & Malaquias, 2020
- † Scaphander miriamae Dell, 1952
- Scaphander mundus Watson, 1883
- † Scaphander nannus Woodring 1928
- Scaphander nobilis Verrill, 1884
- Scaphander obnubilus Siegwald & Malaquias, 2024
- † Scaphander oligoturritus Sacco 1897
- Scaphander otagoensis Dell, 1956
- † Scaphander parisiensis A. d'Orbigny, 1850
- Scaphander pilsbryi McGinty, 1955 (taxon inquirendum)
- Scaphander planeticus Dall, 1908
- † Scaphander polysarcus Cossmann and Pissarro 1913
- Scaphander primus (unassessed)
- Scaphander punctostriatus (Mighels & C. B. Adams, 1842) - giant canoe-bubble
- † Scaphander radii Abbass 1967
- † Scaphander rarus Wade 1926
- † Scaphander remondi Philippi 1887
- † Scaphander reticulatus Pecchioli, 1864 (unassessed)
- † Scaphander scapha Laws, 1933
- Scaphander semicallus Siegwald & Malaquias, 2024
- Scaphander sibogae Schepman, 1913
- Scaphander solomonensis Siegwald & Malaquias, 2024
- † Scaphander stewarti Durham 1944
- Scaphander sulcatinus A. Adams, 1862 (nomen dubium)
- † Scaphander tarbelliana (Grateloup, 1837)
- † Scaphander tenuis G. F. Harris, 1897
- Scaphander teramachii (Habe, 1954)
- † Scaphander toringa Dell, 1952
- Scaphander tortuosus Siegwald & Malaquias, 2024
- † Scaphander washingtonensis Tegland 1933
- † Scaphander watsoni Dall, 1881
- Scaphander watsoni rehderi
- Scaphander willetti Dall, 1919 (taxon inquirendum)
- † Scaphander yonabaruensis MacNeil, 1961

Species brought into synonymy

- Scaphander alatus Dall, 1895: synonym of Scaphander mundus Watson, 1883
- † Scaphander alaskensis Clark 1932: synonym of † Acila gettysburgensis alaskensis (B. L. Clark, 1932)
- Scaphander attenuatus Schepman, 1913: synonym of Scaphander cancellatus E. von Martens, 1902 (junior subjective synonym)
- Scaphander bathymophilus Dall, 1881: synonym of Sabatia bathymophila (Dall, 1881) (superseded combination)
- Scaphander brownii Leach, 1852: synonym of Scaphander lignarius (Linnaeus, 1758)
- Scaphander cumingii A. Adams, 1862: synonym of Philine cumingii (A. Adams, 1862) (original combination)
- Scaphander cylindrellus Dall, 1908: synonym of Cylichnium cylindrellum (Dall, 1908) (original combination)
- † Scaphander duseni Stilwell & Zinsmeister, 1992: synonym of † Kaitoa duseni (Stilwell & Zinsmeister, 1992)
- Scaphander fragilis (Habe, 1952): synonym of Eoscaphander fragilis Habe, 1952
- Scaphander gibbulus Jeffreys, 1856: synonym of Weinkauffia gibbula (Jeffreys, 1856): synonym of Weinkauffia turgidula (Forbes, 1844) (original combination)
- Scaphander giganteus Risso, 1826: synonym of Scaphander lignarius (Linnaeus, 1758)
- Scaphander japonicus Adams, 1862: synonym of Nipponoscaphander japonicus (A. Adams, 1862) (superseded combination, original combination)
- Scaphander librarius Lovén, 1846: synonym of Scaphander punctostriatus (Mighels & C. B. Adams, 1842)
- Scaphander loisae Bullis, 1956: synonym of Scaphander bathymophilus (Dall, 1881)
- Scaphander mulitstriata Brazier, 1877: synonym of Scaphander multistriatus Brazier, 1877: synonym of Scaphander japonicus A. Adams, 1862 (incorrect gender of species epithet)
- Scaphander multistriatus Brazier, 1877: synonym of Scaphander japonicus A. Adams, 1862
- Scaphander niveus R. B. Watson, 1883: synonym of Sabatia nivea (R. B. Watson, 1883) (original combination)
- Scaphander pilsbryi McGinty, 1955: synonym of Scaphander darius Marcus & Marcus, 1967
- Scaphander pustulosus Dall, 1895: synonym of Sabatia pustulosa Dall, 1895 (original combination)
- Scaphander robustus Okutani, 1966: synonym of Sabatia robusta (Okutani, 1966) (superseded combination)
- Scaphander sibogae (Schepman, 1913): synonym of Scaphander attenuatus Schepman, 1913 (invalid: junior secondary homonym of Scaphander sibogae Schepman, 1913)
- Scaphander stigmatica Dall, 1927: synonym of Scaphander nobilis Verrill, 1884
- Scaphander subglobosa Schepman, 1913: synonym of Scaphander subglobosus Schepman, 1913 (original spelling; incorrect gender agreement of specific epithet)
- Scaphander subglobosus Schepman, 1913: synonym of Scaphander cancellatus E. von Martens, 1902
- Scaphander takedai (Habe, 1981): synonym of Sabatia takedai (Habe, 1981) (superseded combination)
- Scaphander targionius Risso, 1826: synonym of Scaphander lignarius (Linnaeus, 1758)
- Scaphander vicinus E. A. Smith, 1906: synonym of Scaphander mundus R. B. Watson, 1883 (junior subjective synonym)
