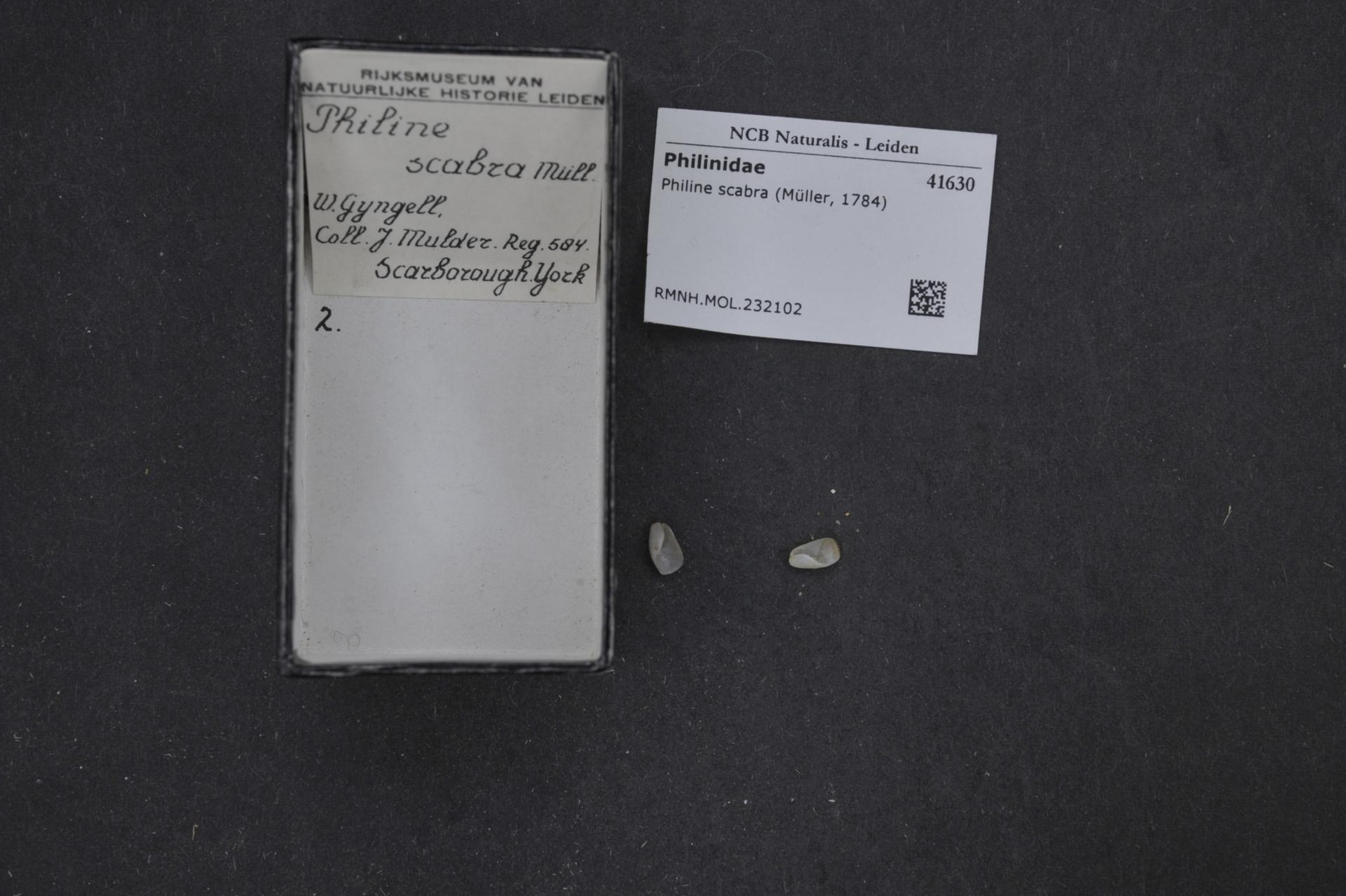

Scientific classification
- Kingdom: Animalia
- Phylum: Mollusca
- Class: Gastropoda
- Family: Philinidae
- Genus: Hermania
- Species: H. scabra

Binomial name
- Hermania scabra (Müller, 1784)

Synonyms
- Bulla pectinata Dillwyn, 1817; Bulla scabra O. F. Müller, 1784 (original combination); Bullaea catenulifera MacGillivray, 1843; Bullaea granulosa M. Sars, 1835; Philine loveni Malm, 1855; Philine scabra (Müller, 1784)

= Hermania scabra =

Species of gastropod

Hermania scabra is a species of gastropods belonging to the family Philinidae.

The species is found in Europe.
