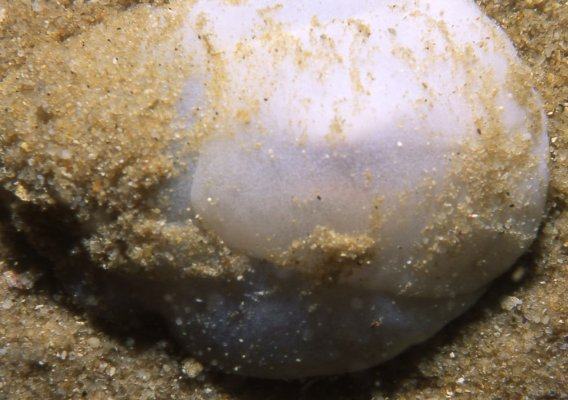
- A close-up of a live Philine aperta

Scientific classification
- Kingdom: Animalia
- Phylum: Mollusca
- Class: Gastropoda
- Order: Cephalaspidea
- Family: Philinidae
- Genus: Philine
- Species: P. aperta

Binomial name
- Philine aperta (Linnaeus, 1767)

Synonyms
- Bulla aperta Linnaeus, 1767 (original combination); Bulla schroeteri R. A. Philippi, 1844; Bullaea capensis L. Pfeiffer, 1840; Bullaea schroeteri R. A. Philippi, 1844 junior subjective synonym

= Philine aperta =

Species of gastropod

Philine aperta, the sand slug, is a species of predatory sea slug with an internal shell, a cephalaspid opisthobranch, or head-shield slug. It is a marine gastropod mollusc in the family Philinidae.

== Taxonomy ==
Philine aperta and Philine quadripartita have long been treated as synonyms. However, according to Price et al. (2011), anatomical evidence shows that they are two distinct species, the former occurring in South Africa and Mozambique and the latter in European seas.

== Distribution ==
This species can be found in the eastern Atlantic Ocean from northern Europe to southern Africa and is also found in the Pacific and Indian Oceans. It lives from the subtidal zone to depths of several hundred metres; in tropical waters it is found in deeper water. In southern Africa it occurs from Saldanha Bay on the west coast to Mozambique, from the subtidal zone to a depth of 100 m.

== Description ==
Adults have a body length of 60–70 mm, reaching up to 100 mm.

Philine aperta is a sturdy, solid-bodied animal, white to cream in colour, with an internal shell and a folded appearance. It grows up to 100 mm in length.

The shell is internal and fully covered by the animal’s body. The body is divided into a head shield, which is flattened for burrowing in sandy substrates, a posterior shield that overlies the viscera and internal shell, and two lateral lobes, one on each side. The internal shell is thin and translucent.

The somewhat translucent animal is uniformly milky white to yellowish.

== Ecology ==
Philine aperta is an active, sand-dwelling, predatory species; it eats small molluscs and worms which are swallowed whole, and then crushed in its gizzard. The animal secretes sulphuric acid to deter predators.

Its egg masses are translucent, sausage-shaped and are attached to sandy bottoms by long mucous threads.
