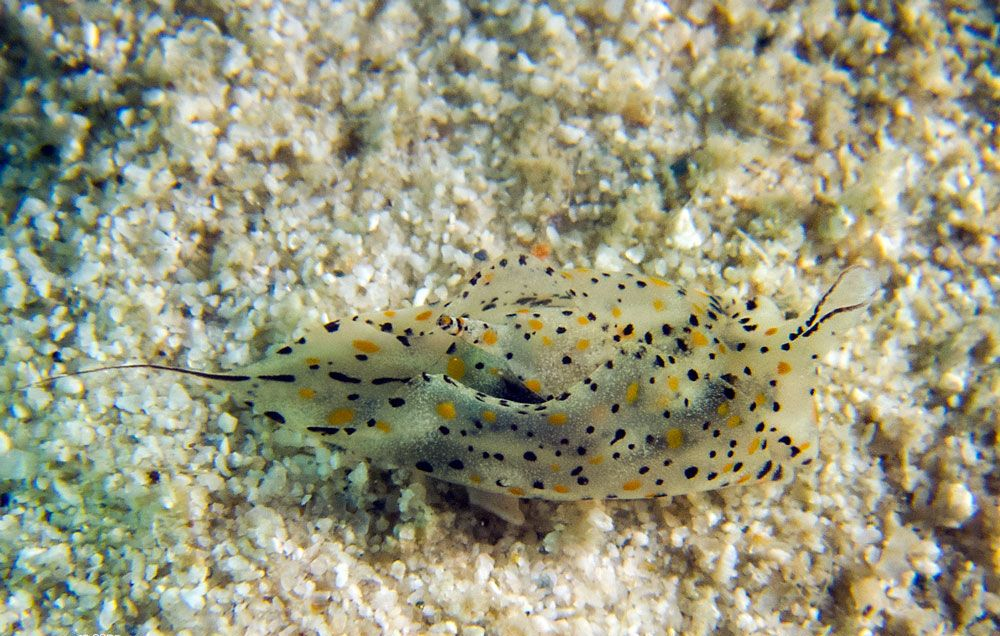
- Gastropteron bicornutum

Scientific classification
- Kingdom: Animalia
- Phylum: Mollusca
- Class: Gastropoda
- Family: Gastropteridae
- Genus: Gastropteron; Kosse, 1813

= Gastropteron =

Genus of gastropods

Gastropteron is a genus of small colorful sea slugs, marine gastropod molluscs in the family Gastropteridae.

== Species ==
Species within the genus Gastropteron include:

- Gastropteron bicornutum Baba & Tokioka, 1965
- Gastropteron chacmol Gosliner, 1989
- Gastropteron hamanni Gosliner, 1989
- Gastropteron japonicum Tokioka & Baba, 1964
- Gastropteron odhneri Gosliner, 1989
- Gastropteron pacificum Bergh, 1894
- Gastropteron rubrum (Rafinesque, 1814)
- Gastropteron sibogae Bergh, 1905
- Gastropteron sinense A. Adams, 1861
- Gastropteron vespertilium Gosliner & Armes, 1984 – flapping dingbat
- Gastropteron viride Tokioka & Baba, 1964

Synonymy:

- Gastropteron alboaurantium Gosliner, 1984 = Siphopteron alboaurantium (Gosliner, 1984)
- Gastropteron brunneomarginatum Carlson & Hoff, 1974 = Siphopteron brunneomarginatum (Carlson & Hoff, 1974)
- Gastropteron cinereum Dall, 1925 = Gastropteron pacificum Bergh, 1894
- Gastropteron citrinum Carlson & Hoff, 1974 = Siphopteron citrinum (Carlson & Hoff, 1974)
- Gastropteron flavobrunneum Gosliner, 1984 = Siphopteron flavobrunneum (Gosliner, 1984)
- Gastropteron flavum Tokioka & Baba, 1964 = Siphopteron flavum (Tokioka & Baba, 1964)
- Gastropteron fuscum Baba & Tokioka, 1965 = Siphopteron fuscum (Baba & Tokioka, 1965)
- Gastropteron ladrones Carlson & Hoff, 1974 = Siphopteron ladrones (Carlson & Hoff, 1974)
- Gastropteron meckeli Blainville, 1825 = Gastropteron rubrum (Rafinesque, 1814)
- Gastropteron michaeli Gosliner & Williams, 1988 = Siphopteron michaeli (Gosliner & Williams, 1988)
- Gastropteron pohnpei Hoff & Carlson, 1983 = Siphopteron pohnpei (Hoff & Carlson, 1983)
