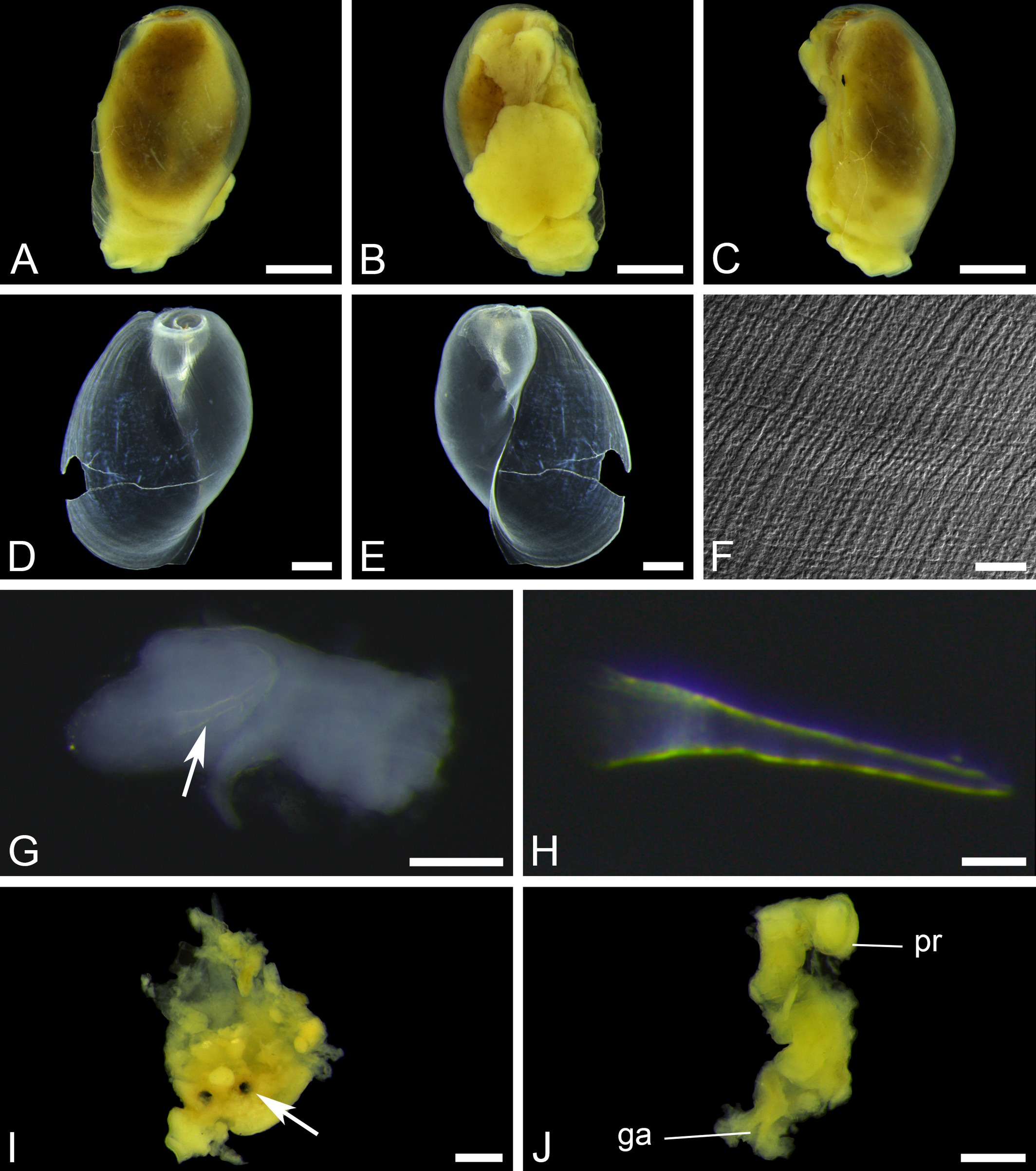
- Gastropod Laona Nanseni

Scientific classification
- Domain: Eukaryota
- Kingdom: Animalia
- Phylum: Mollusca
- Class: Gastropoda
- Infraclass: Euthyneura
- Superfamily: Philinoidea
- Family: Laonidae
- Genus: Laona; A.Adams, 1865

Synonyms
- Ossiania Monterosato, 1884; Praephiline Chaban & Soldatenko, 2009; Rhinodiaphana Lemche, 1967; Utriculopsis M. Sars, 1870

= Laona (gastropod) =

Genus of snails

Laona is a genus of gastropods belonging to the family Laonidae.

The species of this genus are found in Europe and America.

Species:

- Laona alternans (van der Linden, 1995)
- Laona californica (Willett, 1944)
- Laona chilla (Er.Marcus & Ev.Marcus, 1969)
- Laona condensa (van der Linden, 1995)
- Laona confusa (Ohnheiser & Malaquias, 2013)
- Laona grandioculi (Ohnheiser & Malaquias, 2013)
- Laona nanseni Malaquias, Ohnheiser, Oskars & Willassen, 2016
- Laona pruinosa (W.Clark, 1827)
- Laona quadrata (S.Wood, 1839)
- Laona thurmanni (Ev.Marcus & Er.Marcus, 1969)
- Laona ventricosa (Jeffreys, 1865)

Synonyms

- Laona finmarchica (M. Sars, 1859): synonym of Praephiline finmarchica (M. Sars, 1859)
- Laona flexuosa (M. Sars, 1859): synonym of Laona pruinosa (W. Clark, 1827)
