= Retusophiline malaquiasi =

Scientific classification
- Kingdom: Animalia
- Phylum: Mollusca
- Class: Gastropoda
- Order: Cephalaspidea
- Family: Laonidae
- Genus: Retusophiline
- Species: R. malaquiasi

Binomial name
- Retusophiline malaquiasi A.Valdés, Cadien & Gosliner, 2016
- Holotype site: Beaufort Sea, Arctic Ocean at a depth of 27 m.

Species of gastropod

Retusophiline malaquiasi is a species of sea snail, a marine gastropod in the family Laonidae. It was first described as Philine malaquiasi in 2016 by Ángel A. Valdés, Donald Cadien and Terrence Gosliner, but was transferred to the genus, Retusophiline, in 2022 by the Russian malacologists, Elena Chaban and Dmitry Danilin, "based on the morphology of the headshield, gizzard and copulatory system".

The species is found in the Beaufort Sea of the Arctic Ocean, mosly at depths of about 30 m.,and is known only from preserved specimens. The species epithet hnours "Manuel A. E. Malaquias for his seminal work on the phylogeny of Cephalaspidea in general and Philine in particular".
