= Laonidae =

Scientific classification
- Kingdom: Animalia
- Phylum: Mollusca
- Class: Gastropoda
- Subterclass: Tectipleura
- Order: Cephalaspidea
- Superfamily: Philinoidea
- Family: Laonidae; Pruvot-Fol, 1954

Synonyms
- Laoninae Pruvot-Fol, 1954 (original rank)

Family of snails

Laonidae is a family of small marine snails belonging to the superfamily Philinoidea, though Laonidae and Philinoidea are genetically distinct. They are monophyletic, meaning they developed from a single ancestor. Laonidae also has the synonymised name Laoninae, which is largely unaccepted in the modern day scientific community. The name Laoninae was introduced by Alice Pruvot-Fol who proposed it as the subfamily to the subgenus Laona, A.Adams 1865.

Genera:

- Laona A.Adams, 1865
- Retusophiline Nordsieck, 1972

Genera brought into synonymy

- Ossiania Monterosato, 1884: synonym of Laona A. Adams, 1865
- Praephiline Chaban & Soldatenko, 2009: synonym of Laona A. Adams, 1865
- Rhinodiaphana Lemche, 1967: synonym of Laona A. Adams, 1865
- Utriculopsis M. Sars, 1870: synonym of Laona A. Adams, 1865

== Anatomy ==
=== Shell ===
Most species of Laonidae have umbilicated shells with a net-like pattern or smooth surface. The only exception to this is the species P. quadrata. This species has a non-umbilicated, quadrangular shell with chain-like spiral lines. The pigmented bands on their shells are not a characteristic of any other family under Philinoidea. Most shells will only grow to a maximum of 10mm. Like other sea snails, animals in the Laonidae family have calcareous shells secreted by a mantle which covers the body. Laonidae specifically have a parietal wall extending into the posterior of their shell aperture.

=== Locomotion ===
A ventral muscular foot aids in locomotion by using periodic muscular waves along the foot to move the animals across a surface. These waves attach to the substrate with a thin layer of pedal mucus. The adhesion provided by the mucus is the key to Gastropod locomotion.

=== Digestion ===
Digestion involved salivary and digestive glands that release digestive enzymes. These animals have a "non-muscularized" gizzard and lack gizzard plates: 3 hardened plates inside the muscular esophageal crop (or gizzard) to help crush the shells of prey, found in Cephalaspidean gastropods. In order to feed, Laonidae have a ribbon of small, chitinous teeth, otherwise known as a radula. The teeth are attached to a membrane pulled across a surface by inner mouth muscles. The teeth attach to that membrane then tears through the algae or seaweed on that surface and it is then brought into the mouth. Their radula is used for a herbivorous diet, specialized to remove algae and slice seaweed. They have a 6.1.0.1.6 radular formula. According to the common radula formula, this means the radula has 6 marginal teeth and 1 lateral tooth on each side, and no rachidian or central tooth.

=== Respiration and circulation ===
They have an open circulatory system and a dorsal muscular heart that pumps blood to all tissues.

=== Reproduction ===
As opithsobranchs, these species are simultaneous hermaphrodites, meaning they have both sets of reproductive organs within one individual at the same time.

== Diet ==
Within the clade Cephalaspidea, there are both herbivorous and carnivorous diets. However, due to the small size of species in Laonidae, their diet most likely consists of diatoms, filamentous algae, and foraminiferans.

== Geographic distribution ==
Many species of Laonidae are found on Atlantic coastlines, such as the Eastern United States and Western Europe. A few species are found on the Northern California coast, like the Philine californica Willett, 1944 recently proven to be part of Laonidae. Species in the family Laonidae are typically found in shallow tropical and temperate waters, however they can be very diverse in cold waters. Within the water column, species in this family are mostly found in soft-bottoms of sand or mud and sometimes near seagrass or algae.
