= Philine Tormin =

German actress (1892–1924)

- Philine Tormin, 15 years old, Dresden
- Born: 1 December 1892; Düsseldorf
- Died: 19 April 1924 (aged 31); Hamburg
- Occupation: Actress

Philine Leudesdorff-Tormin, née Philine Tormin (1 December 1892 in Düsseldorf - 19 April 1924 in Hamburg), was a German actress.

== Life ==
=== Childhood and Education ===
Philine Tormin was born in Düsseldorf in 1892. Later, her family moved to Saxony. She first attended school in Radebeul, then in Dresden. From an early age, she showed an interest in the arts, participated in school plays, and expressed her desire to become an actress. She left school early and transferred to the Senff-Georgi Theatre Institute in Dresden, which she attended for six months. Her first engagement was at the summer theatre in Merseburg, where she played Lorle in "Village and Town" (directed by Charlotte Birch-Pfeiffer). This was followed by a winter engagement in Liegnitz, where Carl Clewing of the Royal Playhouse in Berlin saw her and recommended her. Shortly thereafter, the director of the Neue Wiener Bühne (New Vienna Stage) invited her to an audition and subsequently offered her a three-year contract.

=== Engagements Abroad ===
With the Neue Wiener Bühne, Tormin undertook extensive tours, primarily in Austria, but also in Germany and Italy. The then twenty-year-old Tormin gained valuable stage experience and processed these new impressions. Due to her youth and carefree charisma, she was predominantly cast in naive roles, with which she quickly achieved initial success. Her four-week guest appearance at the Residenztheater Dresden, where she played the lead role in the play Als ich noch im Flügelkleid (When I Was Still in a Winged Dress) by Albert Kehm and Martin Frehsee, also received positive reviews. The Dresdner Journal wrote: "We praised the grace and vivacity of this artist in the highest terms at the time, and we can still do so today."

After two years, Tormin moved to the German State Theatre in Prague, where she caused a sensation, particularly as Eleanor in Easter (August Strindberg).

==== Career and Family in Hamburg ====
In 1915, Tormin joined the Thalia Theater in Hamburg. During her nine years there, she appeared in countless plays and was popular with both audiences and critics. Among her greatest successes were the title role in The Prodigal Daughter (Ludwig Fulda) and leading roles in Will and Wiebke (Fedor von Zobeltitz), Scampolo (Dario Niccodemi), and The Circle (William Somerset Maugham).

On May 1, 1918, she married the actor Ernst Leudesdorff. The couple had two children, Hans and Ingeborg.

== Death ==
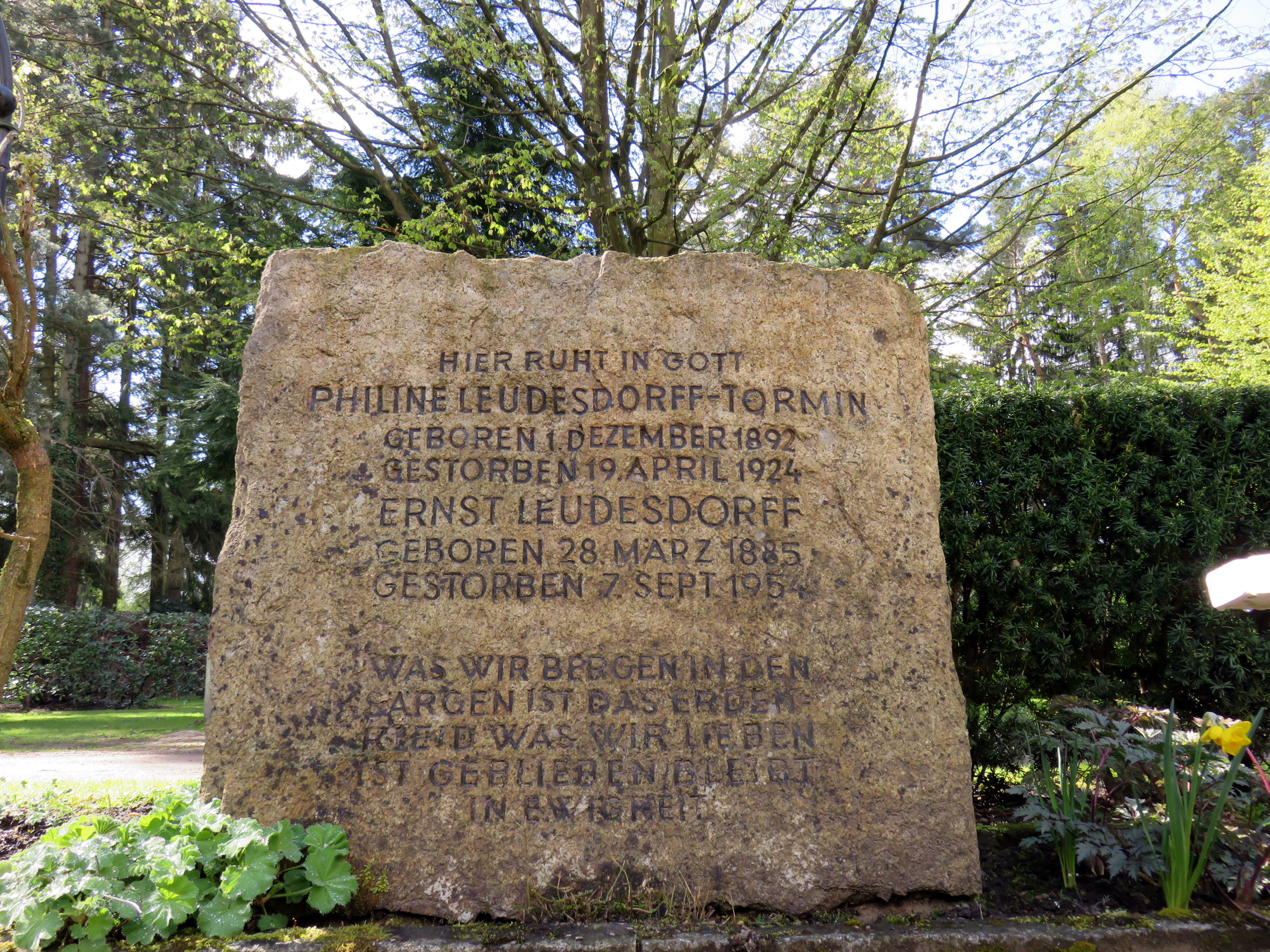
Gravestone in the Garden of Women

In 1924, Tormin died at the age of 31 from complications following a tonsillectomy. She was buried in Ohlsdorf Cemetery in the presence of numerous mourners. Her gravestone is now located in the Frauengarten (Women's Garden).

Obituaries appeared in various newspapers. Philipp Berges, for example, wrote in the Hamburger Fremdenblatt:

“Philine Tormin, young as she was, was already among the greats of her profession; she can easily be counted among the most important German actresses of the present day. She was no longer the cheerful, naive girl for whom she had become known in Hamburg; she had developed into a character actress for whom no role was foreign. As a born artist, she intuitively grasped the essence of each character, almost naively hitting the nail on the head, and played them with unerring accuracy and genuine human sincerity, without any artificiality. The naturalness and ease with which she slipped into serious and lighthearted, lifelike and eccentric roles without hesitation was often astonishing. One never noticed the work behind her performances; she brought her characters to life on stage so naturally and effortlessly. Her winning looks, her magnificent, expressive eyes that defined her entire face, and her overall stage presence carried her.” "Her excellent speaking skills and sparkling temperament also contributed to her success."

== Literature ==
Julie Tormin, Emily Albert: Philine Tormin. A Memorial Book. Hermanns Erben Printing House, Hamburg 1924.
