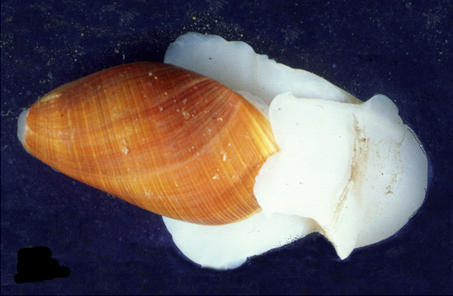
- A live individual of Scaphander lignarius, anterior end to the right

Scientific classification
- Kingdom: Animalia
- Phylum: Mollusca
- Class: Gastropoda
- Subclass: Heterobranchia
- Infraclass: Euthyneura
- Superfamily: Philinoidea
- Family: Scaphandridae; G.O. Sars, 1878

Synonyms
- Triclidae Winckworth, 1932

= Scaphandridae =

Family of gastropods

Scaphandridae is a family of sea snails, marine gastropod mollusks in the superfamily Philinoidea.

== Taxonomy ==
Scaphandridae was considered as a synonym of Cylichnidae in the taxonomy of the Gastropoda by Bouchet & Rocroi, 2005).

However, Malaquias et al. (2009) reinstated Scaphandridae as a valid family.

== Genera ==
- † Alicula Eichwald, 1830
- † Ellipsoscapha Stephenson, 1941
- Kaitoa Marwick, 1931
- † Maoriscaphander Dell, 1950
- † Mirascapha Stewart, 1927
- Nipponoscaphander Kuroda & Habe, 1971
- † Priscaphander Finlay & Marwick, 1937
- Sabatia Bellardi, 1877
- Scaphander Montfort, 1810
- † Taita (gastropod)|Taita Laws, 1948

Genera brought into synonymy

- †: Abderospira Dall, 1896 synonym of Roxania Leach, 1847
- Assula Schumacher, 1817: synonym of Scaphander Montfort, 1810 (objective synonym of Scaphander)
- Brocktonia Iredale, 1915: synonym of Scaphander Montfort, 1810
- Bucconia Dall, 1890: synonym of Scaphander Montfort, 1810
- Bullocardia F. Nordsieck, 1972: synonym of Scaphander Montfort, 1810
- Damoniella Iredale, 1918: synonym of Roxania Leach, 1847 (Unnecessary replacement name for Roxania)
- Gioenia Bruguière, 1789: synonym of Scaphander Montfort, 1810 (suppressed by ICZN Opinion 287)
- Leucophysema Dall, 1908: synonym of Roxania Leach, 1847
- Meloscaphander Schepman, 1913: synonym of Scaphander Montfort, 1810
- Micraenigma Berry, 1953: synonym of Diniatys Iredale, 1936
- Nipponoscaphander Kuroda & Habe in Kuroda, Habe & Oyama, 1971: synonym of Scaphander Montfort, 1810
- Sabatina Dall, 1908: synonym of Scaphander Montfort, 1810
- Tricla Philippson, 1788: synonym of Scaphander Montfort, 1810 (Invalid: Placed on the Official Index by ICZN Opinion 287)
