= Philine =

Female given name

Philine is a female given name, that derived from the greek word philai or philéon, meaning „to love“ or „to kiss.“ A rather rare name, it was given to newborns in Germany at least 1.500 times since 2010, while around 100 newborns were given the name’s variant Filine.

== Notable people ==
- Philine Fischer, German soprano singer
- Philine Tormin, German 20th-century actress
