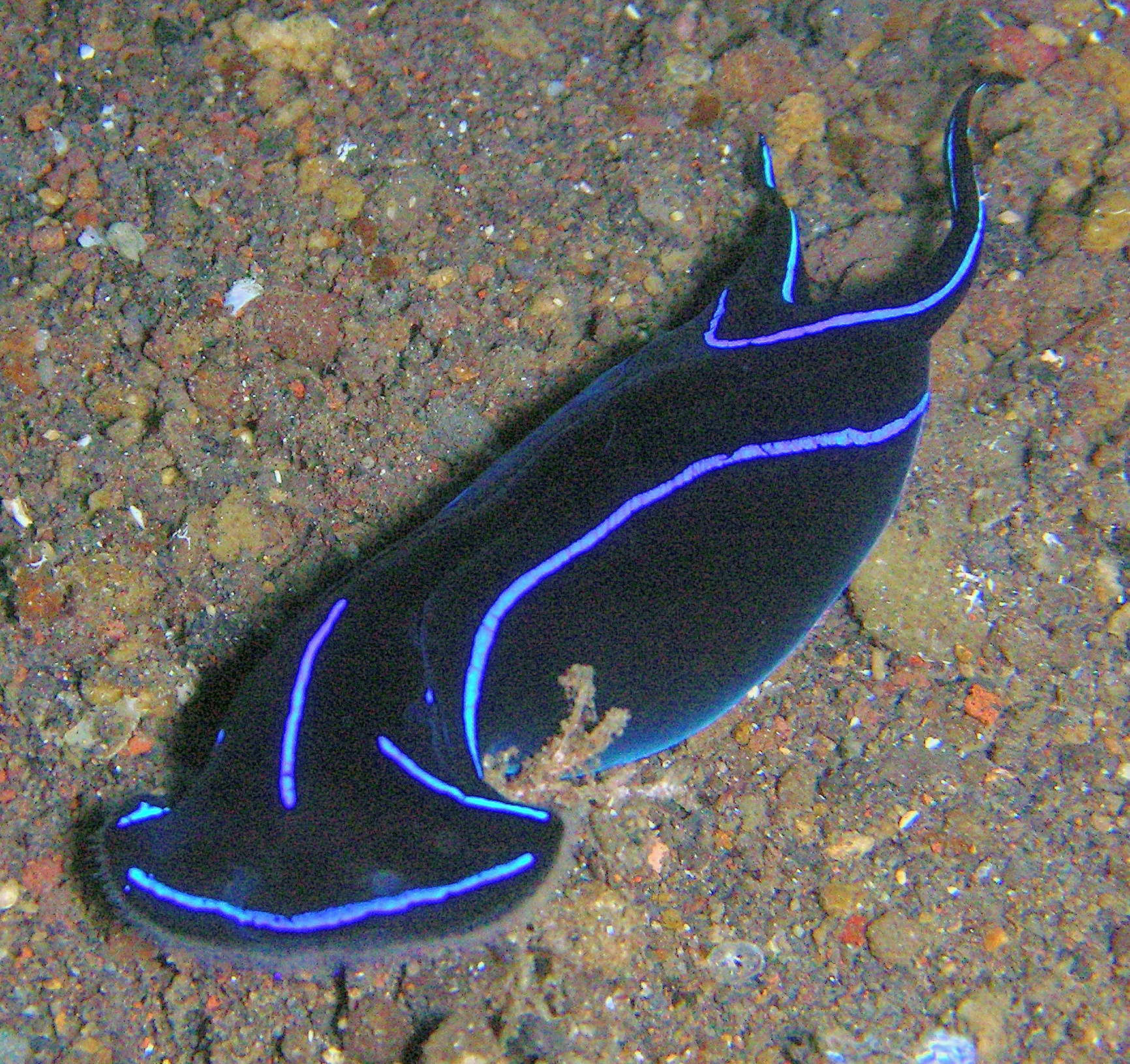
- Chelidonura varians

Scientific classification
- Kingdom: Animalia
- Phylum: Mollusca
- Class: Gastropoda
- Subclass: Heterobranchia
- Infraclass: Euthyneura
- Superfamily: Philinoidea; Gray, 1850 (1815)

= Philinoidea =

Superfamily of gastropods

Philinoidea is a taxonomic superfamily of sea slugs, specifically headshield slugs, marine gastropod mollusks in the order Cephalaspidea.

== Anatomy ==
The species in the Superfamily Philinoidea are generally small animals that have an internal or external shell, and a covered gill. Unlike some related forms, the visceral mass is not sharply set off from the rest of the body.

== Taxonomy ==
According to the latest taxonomy, the following families are recognised in the Superfamily Philinoidea:

- Aglajidae Pilsbry, 1895 (1847)
- Alacuppidae Oskars, Bouchet & Malaquias, 2015
- Antarctophilinidae Moles, Avila & Malaquias, 2019
- Colpodaspididae Oskars, Bouchet & Malaquias, 2015
- Gastropteridae Swainson, 1840
- Laonidae Pruvot-Fol, 1954
- Philinidae Gray, 1850 (1815)
- Philinoglossidae Hertling, 1932
- Philinorbidae Oskars, Bouchet & Malaquias, 2015
  - Philinorbis Habe, 1950
  - Pseudophiline Habe, 1976
- Scaphandridae G.O. Sars, 1878
