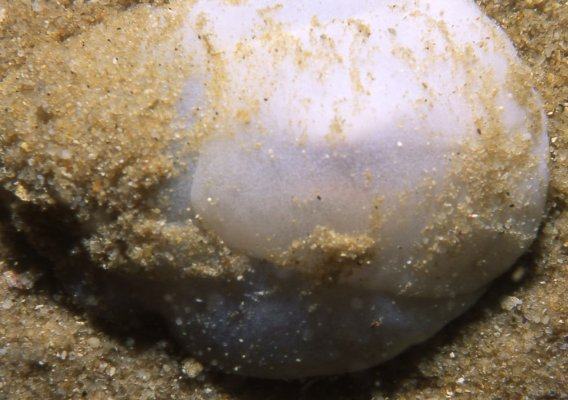
- A close-up view of a live individual of Philine aperta

Scientific classification
- Kingdom: Animalia
- Phylum: Mollusca
- Class: Gastropoda
- Subterclass: Tectipleura
- Order: Cephalaspidea
- Superfamily: Philinoidea
- Family: Philinidae; Gray, 1850 (1815)

Synonyms
- Bullaeidae Rafinesque, 1815

= Philinidae =

Family of gastropods

Philinidae is a family of medium-sized sea slugs, marine opisthobranch gastropod mollusks. These are headshield slugs, in the order Cephalaspidea.

== Genera ==
Genera within the family Philinidae include:

Subfamily Hermaniinae Chaban, Ekimova, Schepetov, Kohnert, Schrödl & Chernyshev, 2019

- Hermania Monterosato, 1884
- Spiniphiline Gosliner, 1988

Subfamily Philininae Gray, 1850 (1815)

- Globophiline Habe, 1958
- Philine Ascanius, 1772 - type genus
- Spiraphiline Moles, Avila & Malaquias, 2019
- Yokoyamaia Habe, 1950

Genera brought into synonymy

- Bullaea Lamarck, 1801: synonym of Philine Ascanius, 1772
- Choshiphiline Habe, 1958: synonym of Philine Ascanius, 1772
- Johania Monterosato, 1884: synonym of Philine Ascanius, 1772
- Lobaria O.F. Müller, 1776: synonym of Philine Ascanius, 1772
- Ossiania Monterosato, 1884: synonym of Philine Ascanius, 1772
- Philingwynia F. Nordsieck, 1972: synonym of Philine Ascanius, 1772
- Retusophiline Nordsieck, 1972: synonym of Philine Ascanius, 1772
- Woodbridgea S. S. Berry, 1953: synonym of Philine Ascanius, 1772 (doubtful synonym)
