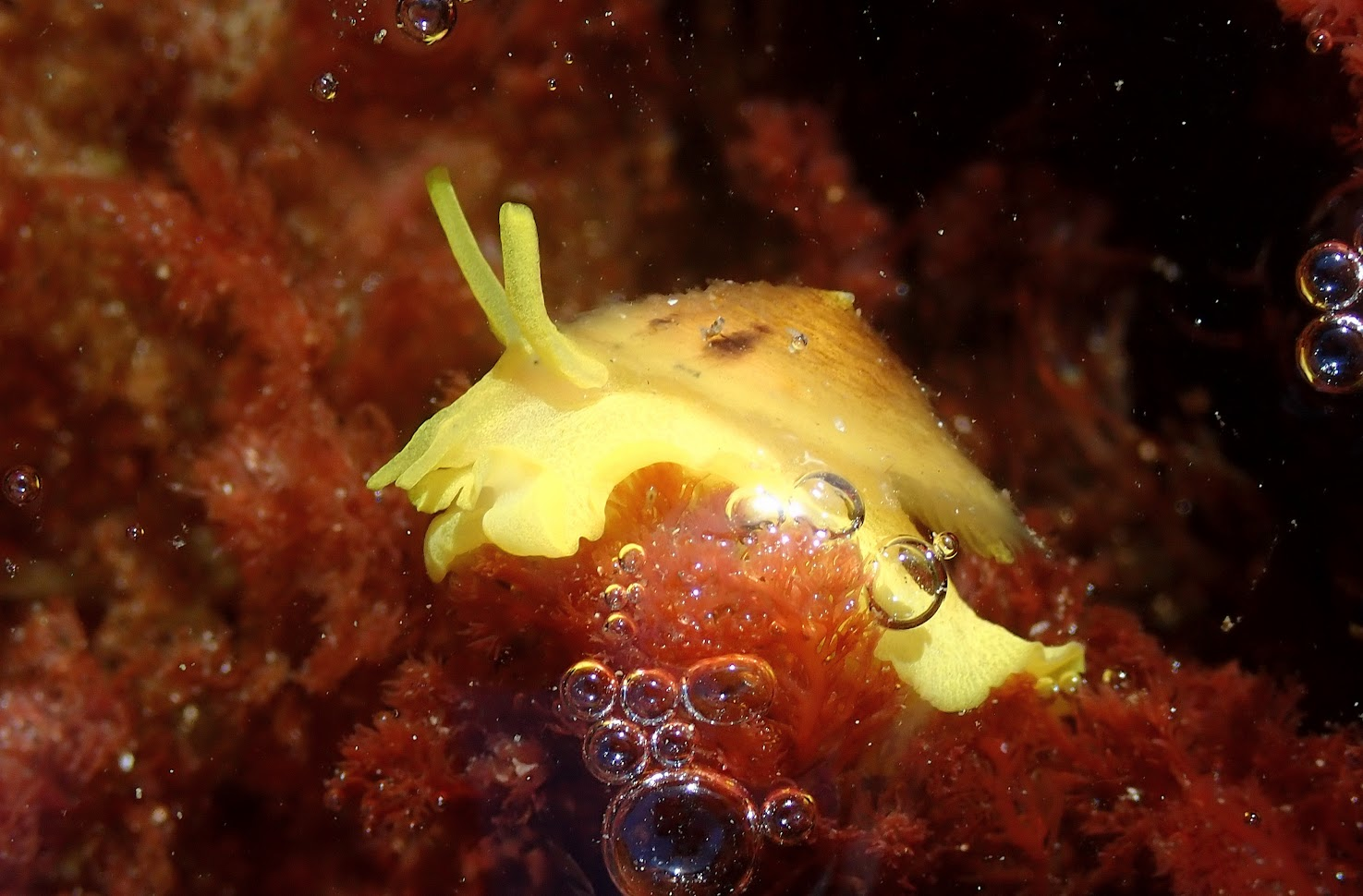
- Tylodina fungina

Scientific classification
- Domain: Eukaryota
- Kingdom: Animalia
- Phylum: Mollusca
- Class: Gastropoda
- Clade: Euopisthobranchia
- Family: Tylodinidae
- Genus: Tylodina
- Species: T. fungina

Binomial name
- Tylodina fungina Gabb, 1865

= Tylodina fungina =

Species of gastropod

Tylodina fungina, commonly known as the yellow umbrella slug or the mushroom sidegill, is a species of sea snail or false limpet, a marine opisthobranch gastropod mollusk in the family Tylodinidae.

== Distribution ==
The yellow umbrella slug is found in the eastern Pacific Ocean, from Cayucos, San Luis Obispo County, California, to Banderas Bay, Jalisco, Mexico, as well as the Galapagos Islands. They inhabit the intertidal zone, and are often observed at depths of 10–20 feet underwater.

== Description ==
Tylodina fungina measures around 3 to 6 cm in length. Their bodies are a bright sulfur yellow, with an external, conical, limpet-like shell that ranges from white to pinkish brown in color, often with small brown bristles and markings. Juveniles are smaller, with more translucent, flatter shells than adults; as they grow in size, their shells grow taller. The rhinophores are rolled, with eyes at their base. They appear somewhat like a capped mushroom, with gills located on the sides of their body, hence the common name "mushroom sidegill." Their other common name, yellow umbrella slug, is shared with their relative, Tylodina perversa, which lives in the northeastern Atlantic Ocean.

== Ecology ==
Tylodina fungina is specialized to feed on the yellow sulfur sponge, Aplysina fistularis, according to the in situ observations on the Pacific coast of Mexico. It is believed to feed exclusively on this sponge.
