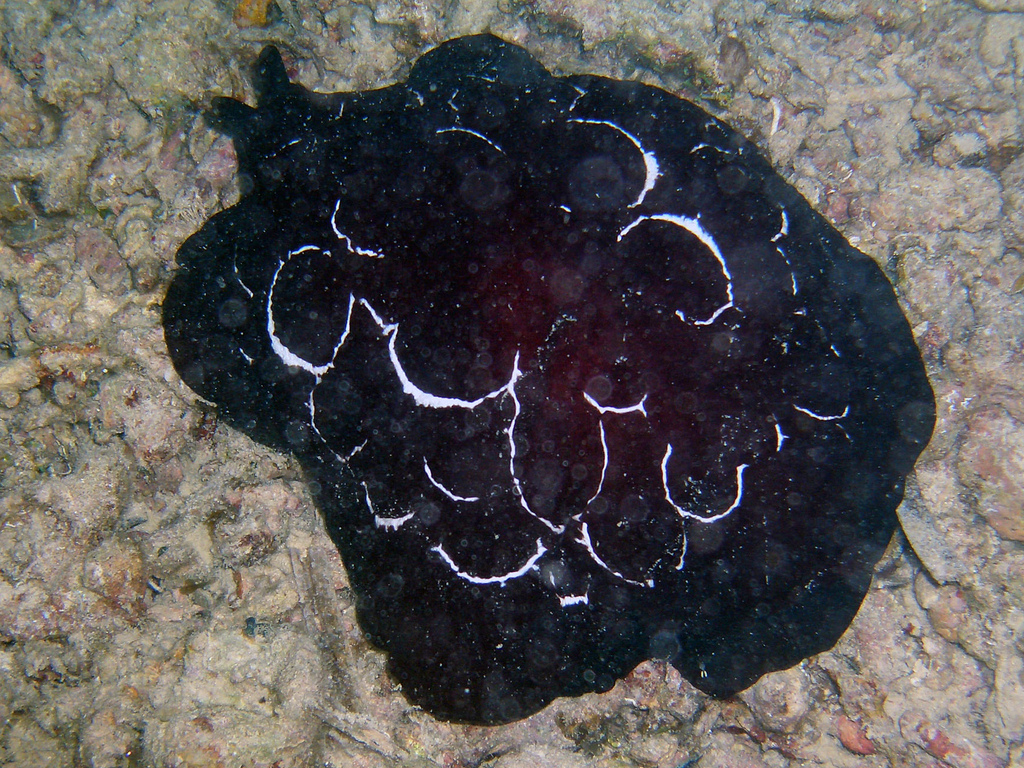
- A live Pleurobranchus forskalii, head end towards the upper left

Scientific classification
- Domain: Eukaryota
- Kingdom: Animalia
- Phylum: Mollusca
- Class: Gastropoda
- Order: Pleurobranchida
- Family: Pleurobranchidae
- Genus: Pleurobranchus
- Species: P. forskalii

Binomial name
- Pleurobranchus forskalii Rueppell & Leuckart, 1828

Synonyms
- Pleurobranchus forskali

= Pleurobranchus forskalii =

Species of gastropod

Pleurobranchus forskalii is a species of side-gill sea slug, a notaspidean, a marine gastropod mollusk in the family Pleurobranchidae.

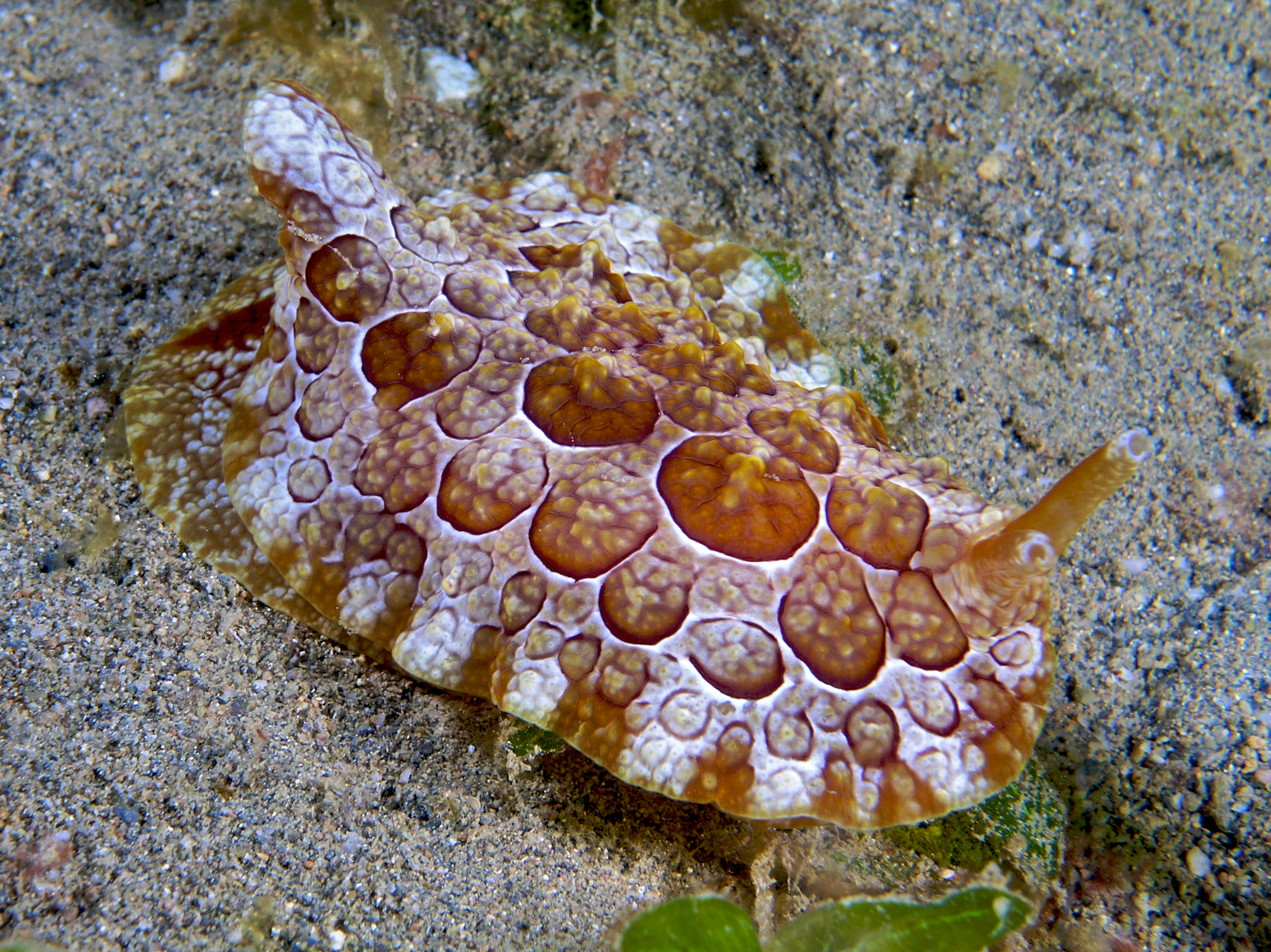
A pale individual of Pleurobranchus forskalii, head end towards the lower right

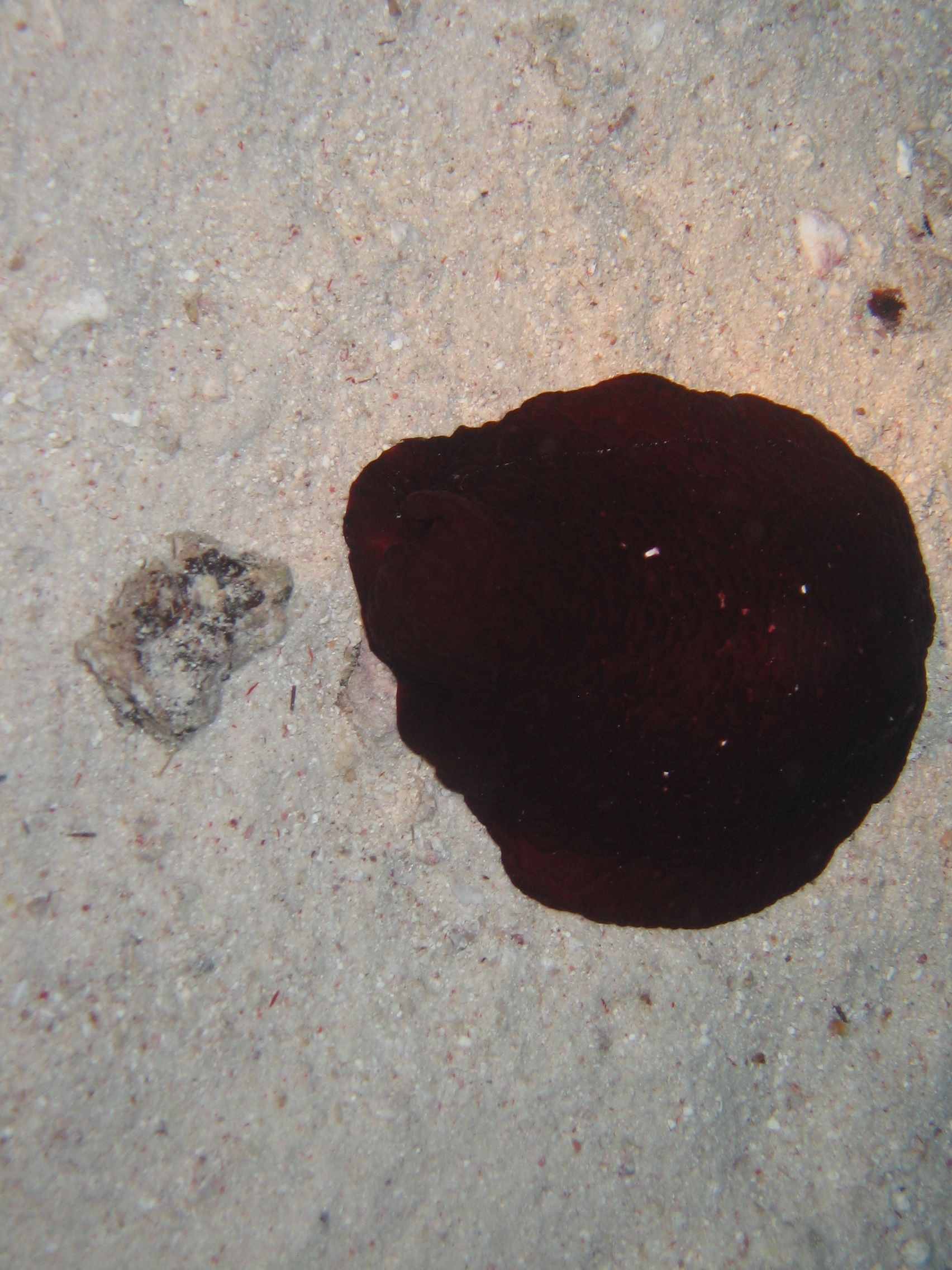
An entirely dark individual of Pleurobranchus forskalii, head end towards the upper left

The specific name was coined in honor of Peter Forsskål.

== Distribution ==
This species occurs in:

- European waters
- Mediterranean Sea
- Red Sea
