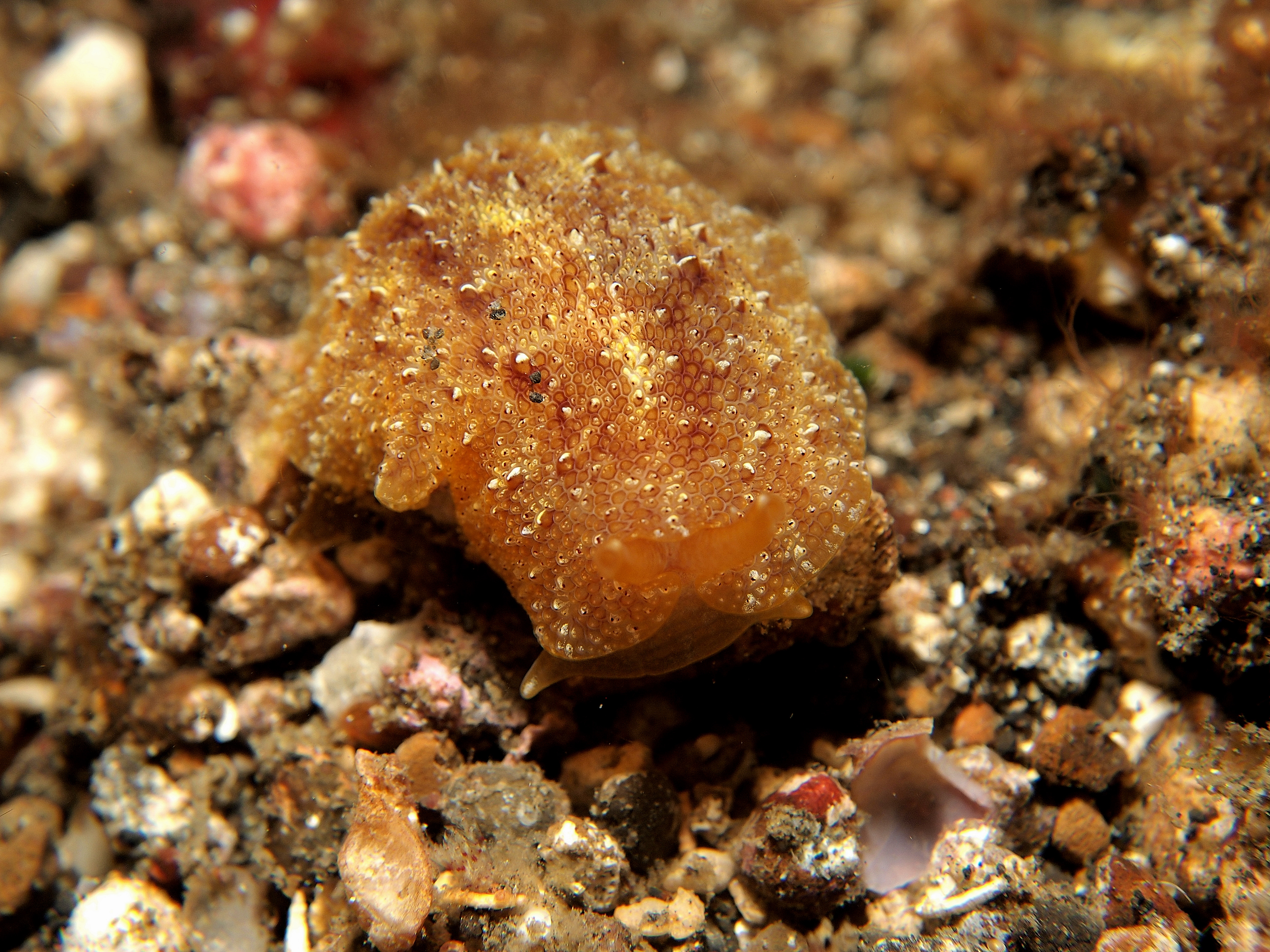
- Anterior view of a live Pleurobranchus albiguttatus

Scientific classification
- Kingdom: Animalia
- Phylum: Mollusca
- Class: Gastropoda
- Order: Pleurobranchida
- Family: Pleurobranchidae
- Genus: Pleurobranchus
- Species: P. albiguttatus

Binomial name
- Pleurobranchus albiguttatus (Bergh, 1905)

= Mosaic pleurobranch =

Species of gastropod

The mosaic pleurobranch, scientific name Pleurobranchus albiguttatus, is a species of sea slug, a sidegill slug, a marine gastropod mollusc in the family Pleurobranchidae.

== Description ==
The mosaic pleurobranch has a sturdy rounded body with a bumpy skin. The skin has occasional elongated papillae and is a glowing pinkish red. The mantle is patterned with lighter lines and the margin is lighter than the mantle. There are two rolled rhinophores joined at their bases on the head. Like all other sidegill slugs, there is a single gill on the right hand side of the body. The animal grows up to 120 mm in total length.

== Distribution ==
This animal has been found off the southern African coast from the Atlantic side of the Cape Peninsula to Algoa Bay. It may be endemic to southern Africa.

== Ecology ==
The species is nocturnal and hides during the day. It feeds on colonial ascidians. Its egg mass is a wavy white spiral with one edge attached.
