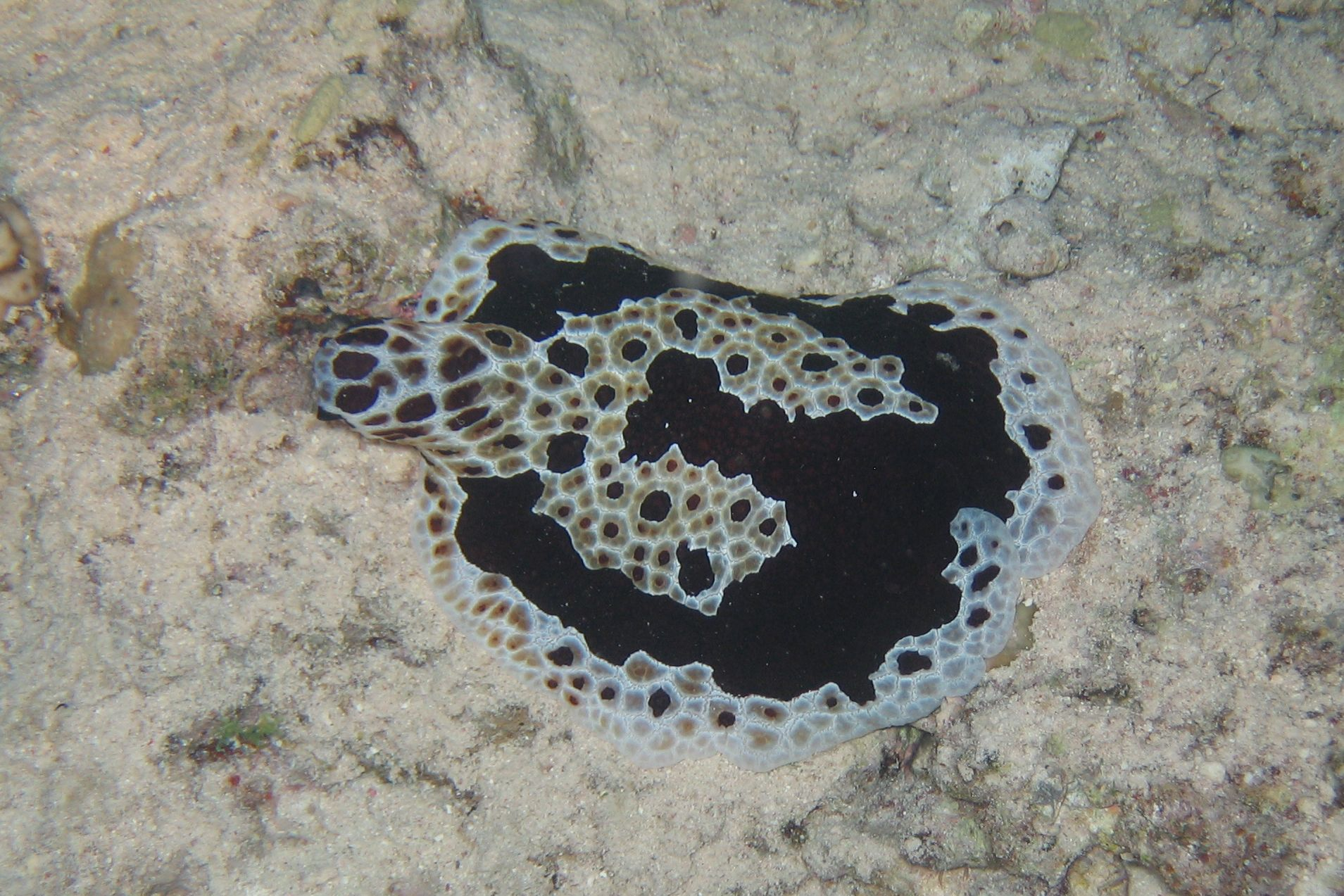
- A live Pleurobranchus grandis in situ, head end towards the left, off Hurghada, Egypt, in the Red Sea, 2008

Scientific classification
- Domain: Eukaryota
- Kingdom: Animalia
- Phylum: Mollusca
- Class: Gastropoda
- Order: Pleurobranchida
- Family: Pleurobranchidae
- Genus: Pleurobranchus
- Species: P. grandis

Binomial name
- Pleurobranchus grandis W. H. Pease, 1868

= Pleurobranchus grandis =

Species of gastropod

Pleurobranchus grandis, the giant pleurobranch, is a species of sidegill slug, a marine gastropod mollusc in the family Pleurobranchidae. Also known as Cuban dancer.

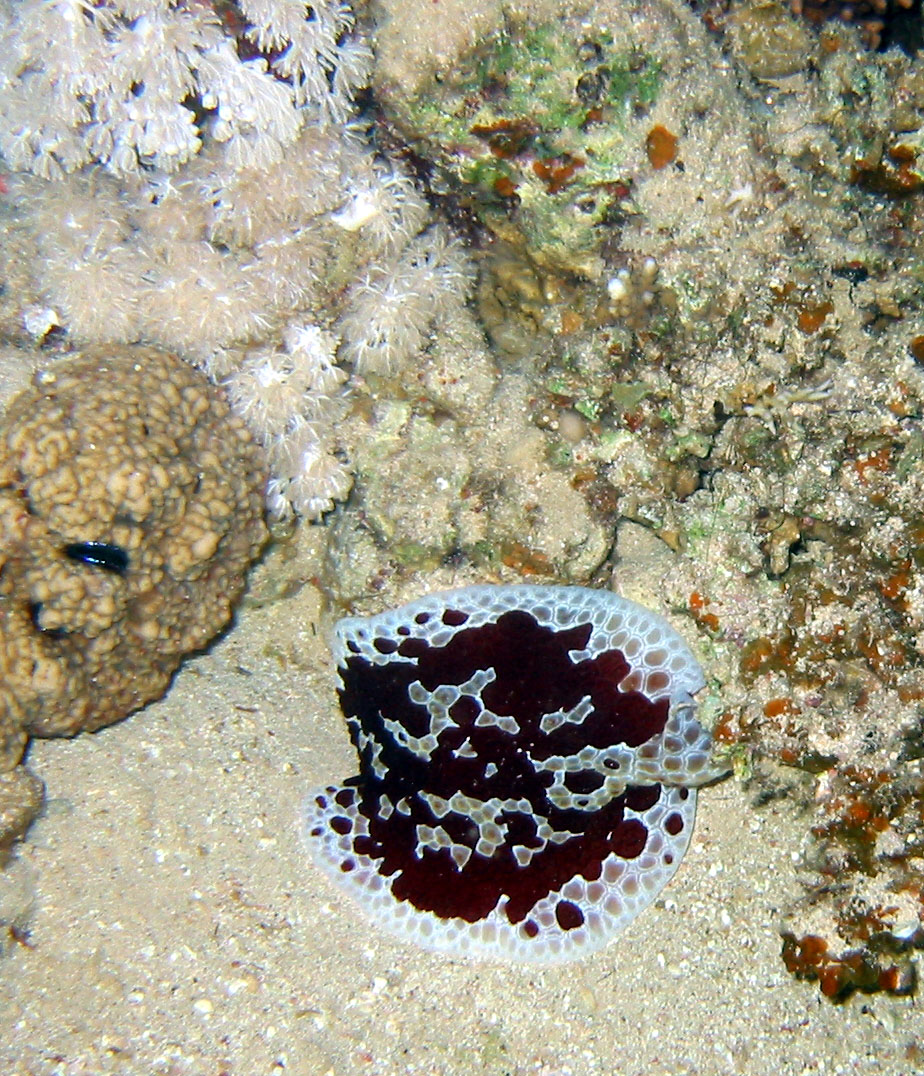
Pleurobranchus grandis in situ, head end towards the right, off Dahab, Egypt, in the Red Sea, 2003

P. grandis is a large sidegill seaslug with highly variable colouration, including combinations of white, cream, yellow, red and black, with tubercles arranged in clusters, Patterns of reticulation, patches, spots or mottling are common. The back end of the foot is rounded. It is nocturnal, and tends to shelter under rocks during the day. It is thought to feed on ascidians.

P. grandis has been reported from Western False Bay, Knysna lagoon, KwaZulu-Natal, Mozambique, northern Indian Ocean and western and central Pacific Ocean, at intertidal to 28m depths.
