= Carabus planicollis planicollis =

Scientific classification
- Domain: Eukaryota
- Kingdom: Animalia
- Phylum: Arthropoda
- Class: Insecta
- Order: Coleoptera
- Suborder: Adephaga
- Family: Carabidae
- Genus: Carabus
- Species: C. planicollis
- Subspecies: C. p. planicollis

Trinomial name
- Carabus planicollis planicollis Küster, 1827

Subspecies of beetle

Carabus planicollis planicollis is a subspecies of ground beetle from Carabinae subfamily that is endemic to Romania.
