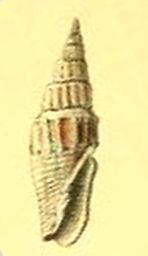
- Drawing of a shell of Vexillum angulosum (holotype)

Scientific classification
- Kingdom: Animalia
- Phylum: Mollusca
- Class: Gastropoda
- Subclass: Caenogastropoda
- Order: Neogastropoda
- Superfamily: Turbinelloidea
- Family: Costellariidae
- Genus: Vexillum
- Species: V. angulosum

Binomial name
- Vexillum angulosum (Küster, 1839)

Synonyms
- Mitra angulosa Küster, 1839 (original combination)

= Vexillum angulosum =

Species of gastropod

Vexillum angulosum is a species of sea snail, a marine gastropod mollusk, in the family Costellariidae, the ribbed miters.

== Description ==
The length of the shell attains 54 mm.

== Distribution ==
This species occurs in the Indian Ocean.
