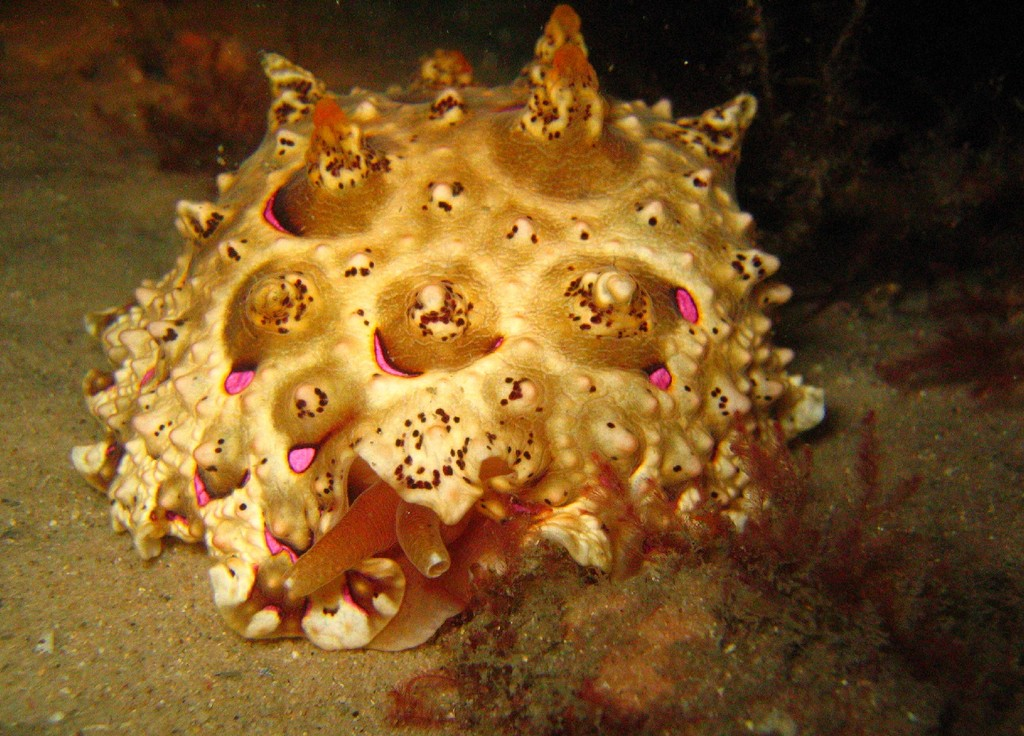
- The head end of a live Pleurobranchus mamillatus in situ at Fly Point, Port Stephens, NSW, Australia, 2006

Scientific classification
- Kingdom: Animalia
- Phylum: Mollusca
- Class: Gastropoda
- Order: Pleurobranchida
- Family: Pleurobranchidae
- Genus: Pleurobranchus
- Species: P. mamillatus

Binomial name
- Pleurobranchus mamillatus Quoy & Gaimard, 1832

= Pleurobranchus mamillatus =

Species of gastropod

Pleurobranchus mamillatus is a species of sidegill slug, a marine gastropod mollusc in the family Pleurobranchidae.
