= Carabus planicollis =

Scientific classification
- Domain: Eukaryota
- Kingdom: Animalia
- Phylum: Arthropoda
- Class: Insecta
- Order: Coleoptera
- Suborder: Adephaga
- Family: Carabidae
- Genus: Carabus
- Species: C. planicollis

Binomial name
- Carabus planicollis Küster, 1827

Species of beetle

Carabus planicollis is a species of black coloured ground beetle from Carabinae subfamily that is endemic to Romania.

Subspecies include:

- Carabus planicollis planicollis
- Carabus planicollis verae
