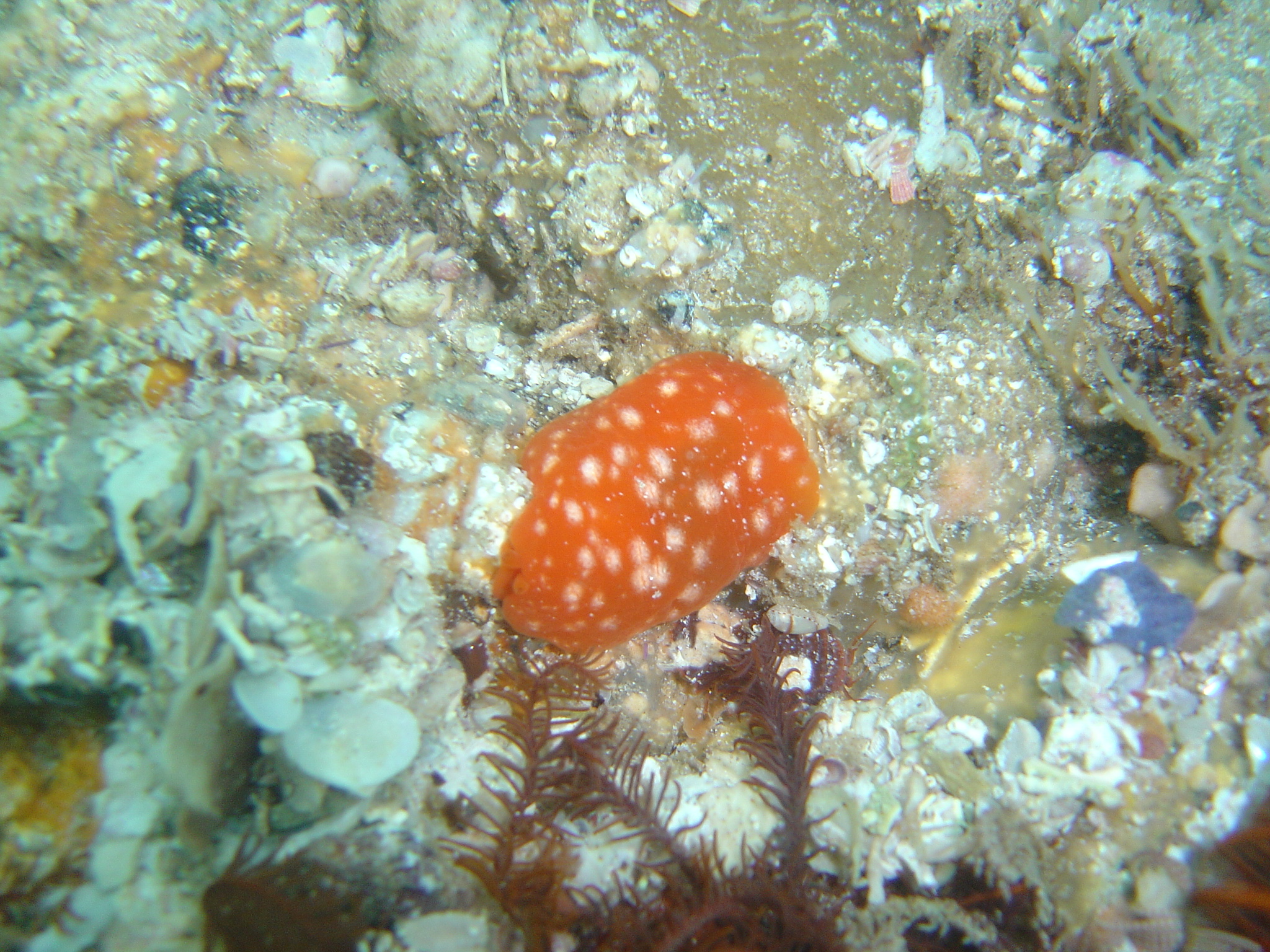

Scientific classification
- Domain: Eukaryota
- Kingdom: Animalia
- Phylum: Mollusca
- Class: Gastropoda
- Order: Pleurobranchida
- Family: Pleurobranchidae
- Genus: Berthellina
- Species: B. granulata

Binomial name
- Berthellina granulata (Krauss, 1848)

Synonyms
- Pleurobranchus granulatus Krauss, 1848; Berthella granulata (Krauss, 1848); Oscaniella granulata (Krauss, 1848)

= Lemon pleurobranch =

Species of gastropod

The lemon pleurobranch (Berthellina granulata) is a species of sea slug, a marine gastropod mollusc in the family Pleurobranchidae.

== Description ==
The lemon pleurobranch is a small smooth oval pleurobranch. The animal is yellow- to orange-coloured and often has white spots. There are two rolled rhinophores joined at their bases on the head. Like all other sidegill slugs, there is a single gill on the right hand side of the body.

The animal grows up to 40 mm in total length.

== Distribution ==
This animal has been found off the whole southern African coast and is known throughout the Indo-Pacific to Hawaii.

== Ecology ==
The species is thought to be a scavenger. Its egg mass is an upright orange collar of one whorl.
