= Pleurobranchus varians =

Scientific classification
- Kingdom: Animalia
- Phylum: Mollusca
- Class: Gastropoda
- Order: Pleurobranchida
- Family: Pleurobranchidae
- Genus: Pleurobranchus
- Species: P. varians

Binomial name
- Pleurobranchus varians Pease, 1860

Species of gastropod

Pleurobranchus varians is a species of sea slug, a sidegill slug, a marine gastropod mollusc in the family Pleurobranchidae.

== Taxonomy ==
The sister species (the closest relative) is Pleurobranchus areolatus from Caribbean. Those two species split 3.10 million years ago (Isthmus of Panama formed 3.1–3.4 Mya). Both species have color morphs and for their proper determination is useful the knowledge of locality.

== Distribution ==
The distribution of P. varians include the Hawaiian Islands and Vanuatu. The type locality is Hawaiian Islands.

== Description ==
P. varians was originally discovered and described by William Harper Pease in 1860. Pease' original text (the type description) reads as follow:

Oval, rather rugose, convex above. Mantle rounded behind,

deeply sinuose in front, and margins slightly undulated. Tentacles arising from the head, curving laterally, deeply grooved below, truncated, cylindrically tapering, transversely lamellated. Eyes at their posterior bases. Oral veil large, convex in front, and much dilating laterally, where it is deeply grooved. Mouth proboscidiform. Branchial plume simple, pinnate on the middle of the right side. Foot large, reaching the edge of the mantle laterally and behind. Colour varying; some bright red, others lemon-yellow, or purplish brown, others again variegated with whitish; beneath paler than above. Shell on the anterior half of the body, concealed, small, fragile, pellucid, oblong-ovate, convex, and ornamented with wrinkles of

growth. Nucleus posterior, more or less brownish.

== Ecology ==
All species in the genus Pleurobranchus are carnivorous.
