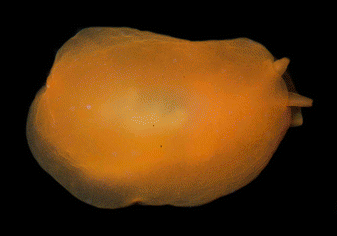
- Dorsal view of Berthellina quadridens

Scientific classification
- Kingdom: Animalia
- Phylum: Mollusca
- Class: Gastropoda
- Order: Pleurobranchida
- Family: Pleurobranchidae
- Genus: Berthellina
- Species: B. quadridens

Binomial name
- Berthellina quadridens (Mörch, 1863)

Synonyms
- Berthella quadridens Mörch, 1863

= Berthellina quadridens =

Species of gastropod

Berthellina quadridens is a species of sea slug, a marine gastropod mollusc in the family Pleurobranchidae.

== Distribution ==
Distribution of Berthellina quadridens includes Mexico, Belize, Colombia, Costa Rica, Panama, Venezuela, Aruba, Curaçao, Haiti, Jamaica, Puerto Rico, Virgin Islands, Sint Maarten, St. Lucia, Guadeloupe, Martinique, Barbados, St. Vincent and the Grenadines, Grenada, Trinidad and Tobago, Brazil.

The type locality is Saint Thomas, U.S. Virgin Islands.

== Description ==
The body is oval and inflated. Dorsum is smooth, covering the internal shell, which is located over the anterior portion of the viscera. The anterior end of the body has a large oral veil. Rhinophores are rolled, emerging between the veil and the dorsum. The color is yellow to orange, semi-translucent. It is up to 25 mm long. Welch (2010) listed that the maximum recorded length is 80 mm.

== Ecology ==
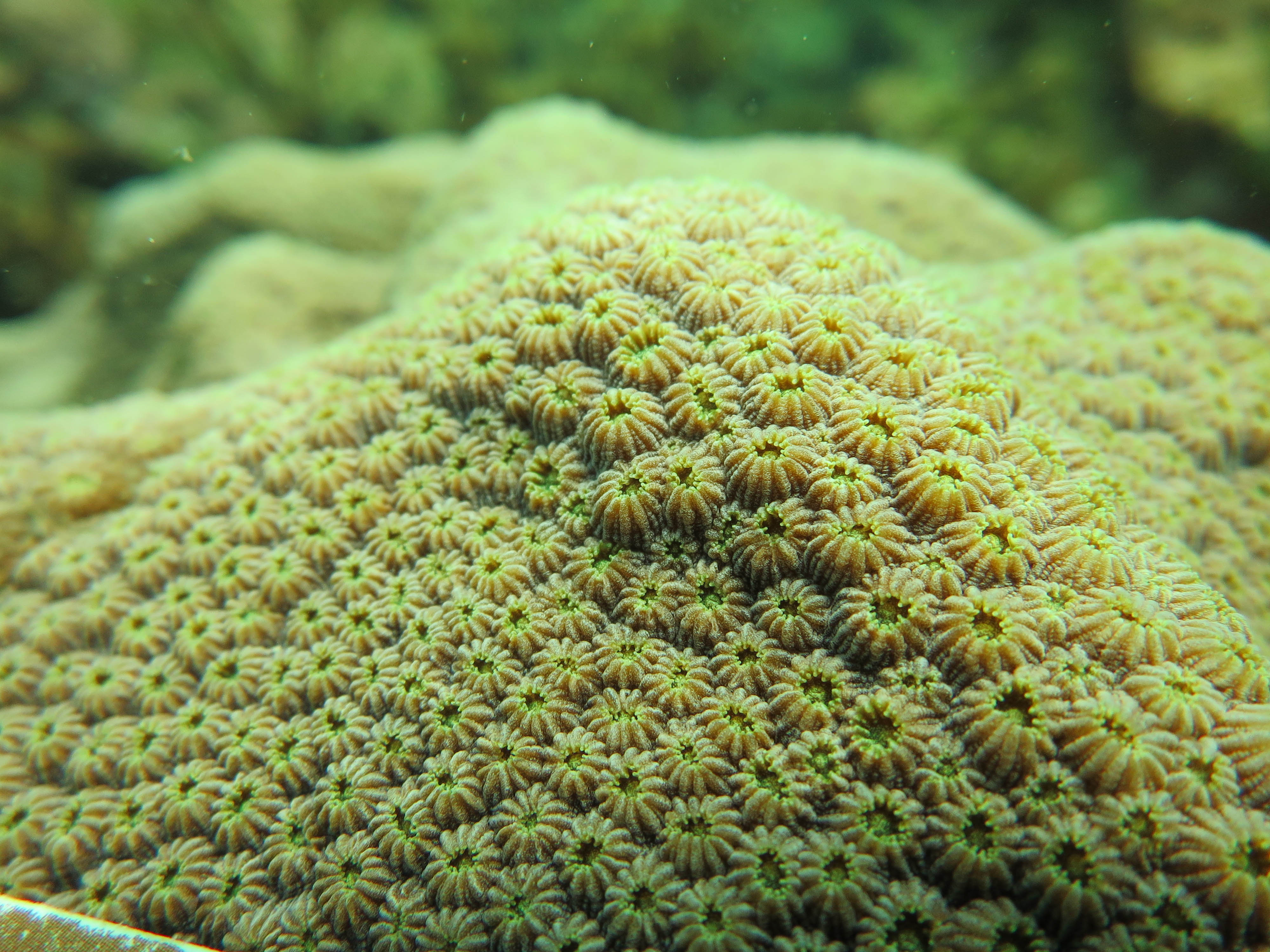
Corals Orbicella faveolata are possible prey of Berthellina quadridens.

Minimum recorded depth is 0 m. Maximum recorded depth is 50 m.

It possibly feeds on sponges and likely on the corals Orbicella faveolata and Orbicella annularis as well as on sea anemones.
