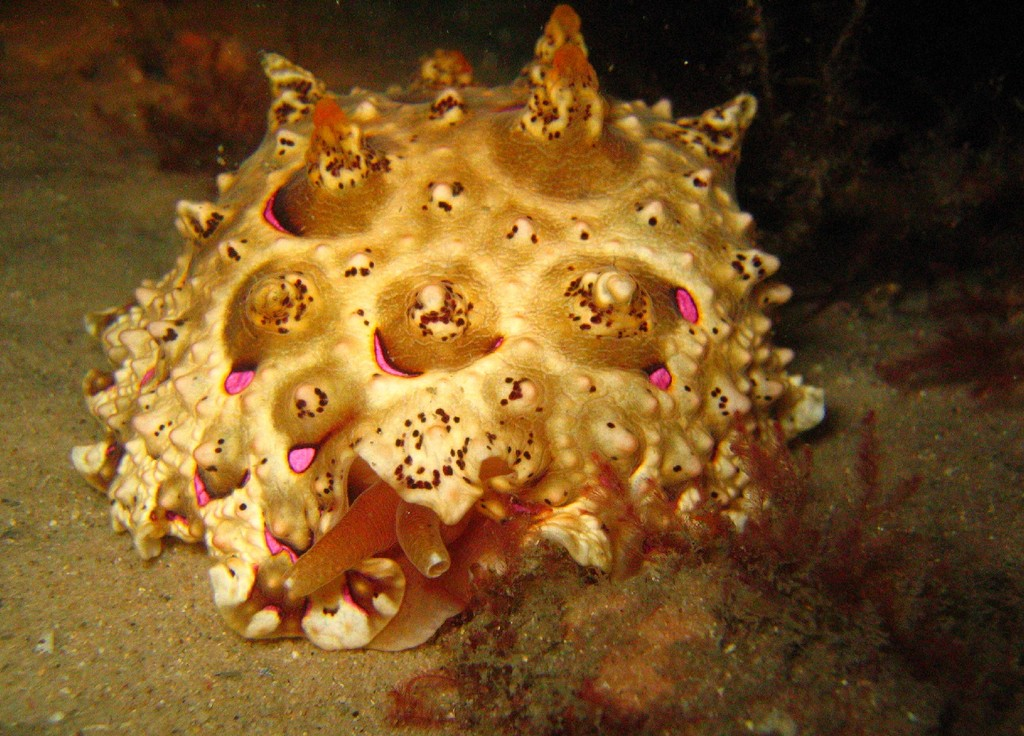
- Pleurobranchus mamillatus

Scientific classification
- Kingdom: Animalia
- Phylum: Mollusca
- Class: Gastropoda
- Order: Pleurobranchida
- Superfamily: Pleurobranchoidea
- Family: Pleurobranchidae
- Genus: Pleurobranchus; Cuvier, 1804

Type species
- Pleurobranchus peronii Cuvier, 1804

Species
- 22 species (see text)

Synonyms
- Oscaniella Bergh, 1897; Oscanius Leach, 1847; Pleurobranchus (Oscanius) Leach, 1847; Pleurobranchus (Pleurobranchus) Cuvier, 1804; Pseudolibania de Stefani, 1879; Susania Gray, 1857

= Pleurobranchus =

Genus of gastropods

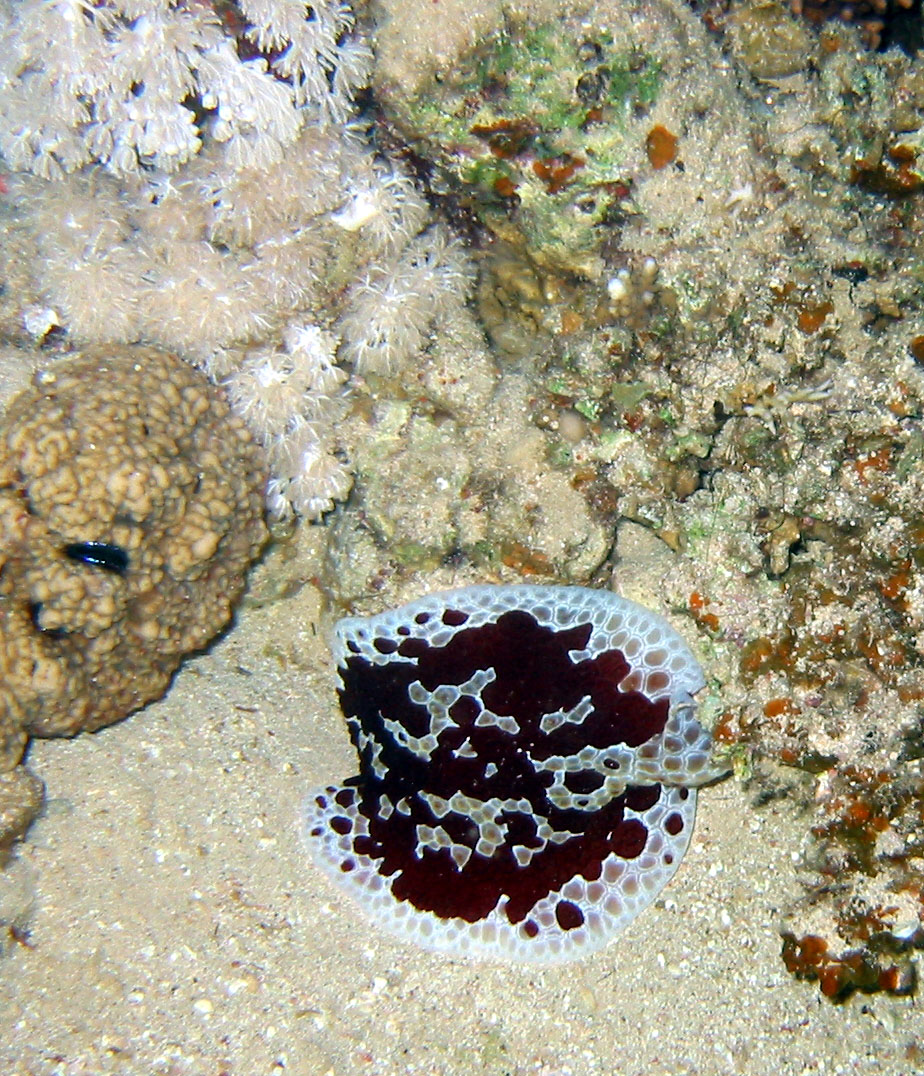
A grand pleurobranch (Pleurobranchus grandis) off Dahab, Egypt.

Pleurobranchus is a genus of sea slugs, specifically side-gill slugs, marine gastropod mollusc in the family Pleurobranchidae.

They typically occur in intertidal and shallow subtidal waters of tropical and subtropical seas worldwide.

== Species ==
As of November 2021, the World Register of Marine Species (WoRMS) recognizes following species as valid:

- Pleurobranchus albiguttatus (Bergh, 1905)
- Pleurobranchus areolatus Mörch, 1863 – Atlantic sidegill slug
- Pleurobranchus crossei Vayssière, 1897
- Pleurobranchus digueti Rochebrune, 1895
- Pleurobranchus evelinae T. E. Thompson, 1977
- Pleurobranchus forskalii Rüppell & Leuckart, 1828
- Pleurobranchus grandis Pease, 1868
- Pleurobranchus hilli (Hedley, 1894)
- Pleurobranchus iouspi Ev. Marcus, 1984
- Pleurobranchus lacteus Dall & Simpson, 1901
- Pleurobranchus mamillatus Quoy & Gaimard, 1832
- Pleurobranchus membranaceus (Montagu, 1816)
- Pleurobranchus nigropunctatus (Bergh, 1907)
- Pleurobranchus niveus (A. E. Verrill, 1901)
- Pleurobranchus obeses K. M. White, 1946
- Pleurobranchus peronii Cuvier, 1804
- Pleurobranchus reticulatus Rang, 1832
- Pleurobranchus semperi (Vayssière, 1896)
- Pleurobranchus sishaensis (Zhang & Lin, 1965)
- Pleurobranchus testudinarius Cantraine, 1835
- Pleurobranchus varians Pease, 1860
- Pleurobranchus weberi (Bergh, 1905)

Goodheart et al. (2015) recognized 14 valid species, while Alvim & Pimenta (2016) recognized one other species.
