= Carabus planicollis verae =

Scientific classification
- Domain: Eukaryota
- Kingdom: Animalia
- Phylum: Arthropoda
- Class: Insecta
- Order: Coleoptera
- Suborder: Adephaga
- Family: Carabidae
- Genus: Carabus
- Species: C. planicollis
- Subspecies: C. p. verae

Trinomial name
- Carabus planicollis verae Csiki, 1905

Subspecies of beetle

Carabus planicollis verae is a subspecies of ground beetle in the subfamily Carabinae that is endemic to Romania.
