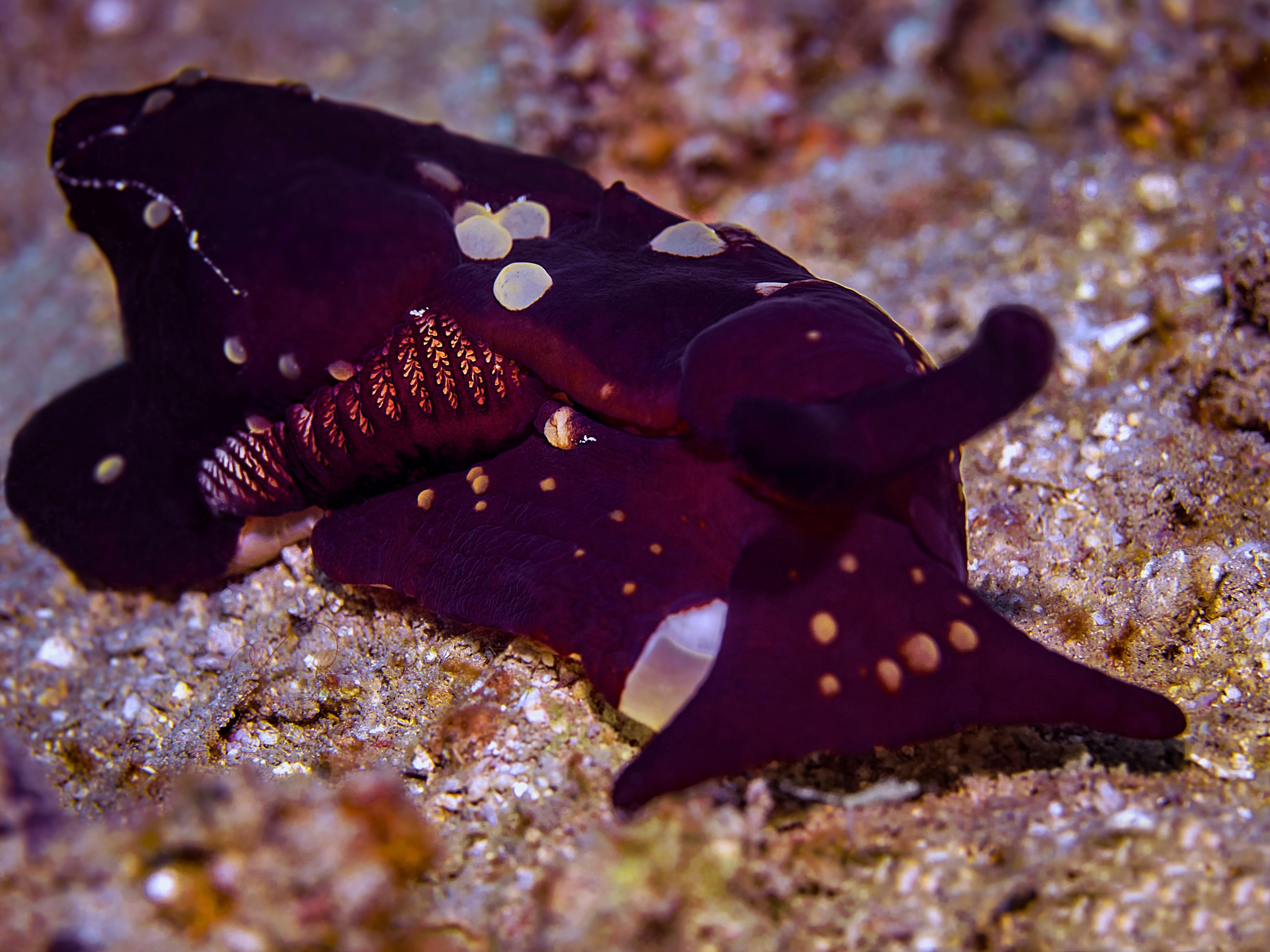

Scientific classification
- Kingdom: Animalia
- Phylum: Mollusca
- Class: Gastropoda
- Order: Pleurobranchida
- Family: Pleurobranchidae
- Genus: Tomoberthella; Moles et al., 2023
- Species: T. martensi

Binomial name
- Tomoberthella martensi (Pilsbry, 1896)

Synonyms
- Berthella kaniae Sphon, 1972; Berthella martensi (Pilsbry, 1896); Gymnotoplax martensi Pilsbry, 1896; Pleurobranchus (Bouvieria) scutatus E. von Martens, 1880; Pleurobranchus scutatus E. von Martens, 1880

= Tomoberthella martensi =

Species of gastropod

Tomoberthella martensi is a species of sea slug, a marine gastropod mollusk in the family Pleurobranchidae.

== Description ==
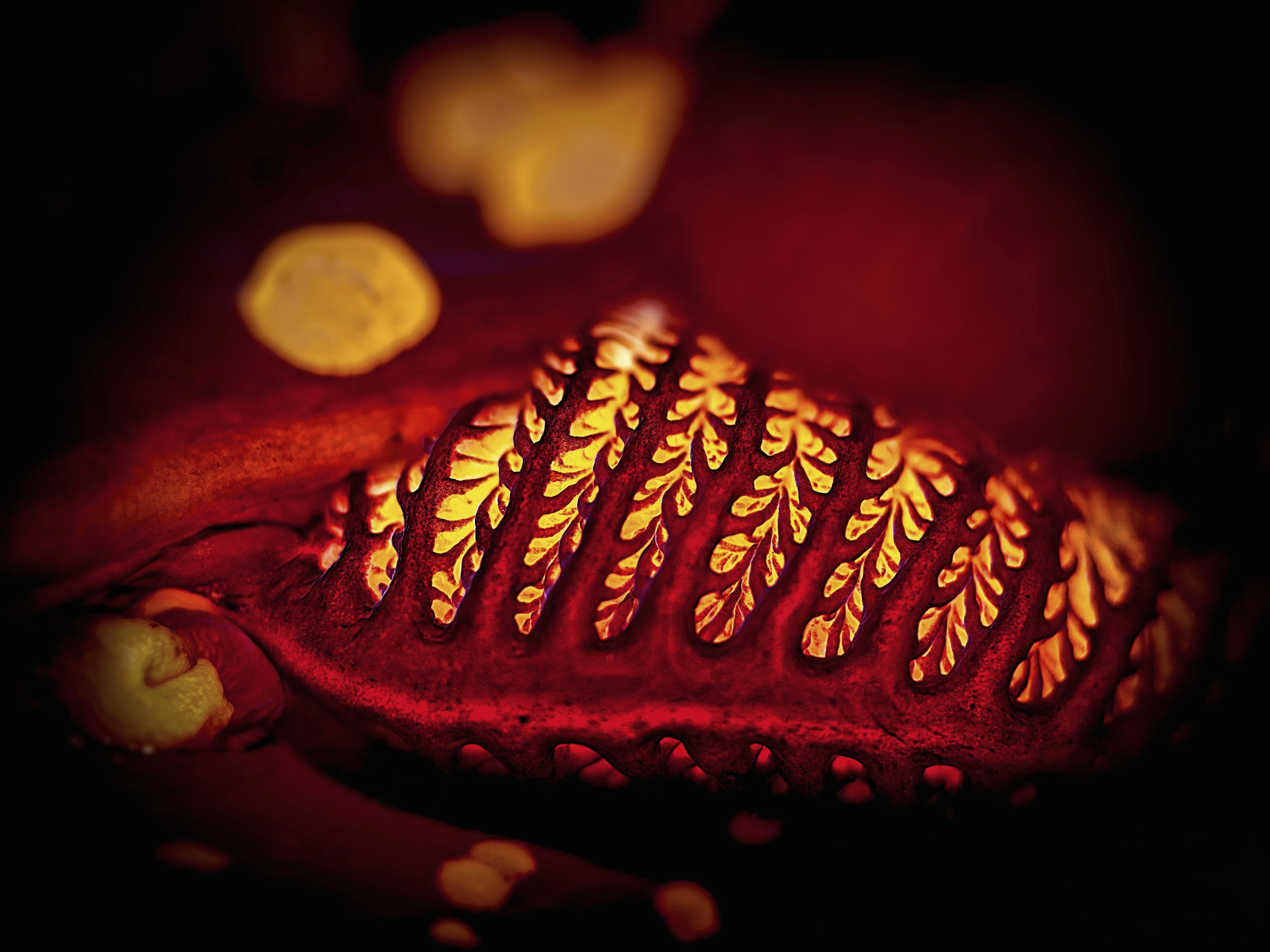
Close-up on the gill, located on the right side of the animal.

This species can reach a length of up to 6 cm (2.4 in). Its body color varies widely, ranging from light orange-brown to black, or from whitish to cream. The body is always marked with spots, which may appear dark or clear depending on the dominant background color. The mantle, which covers the body, is composed of four distinct parts: dorsal, anterior, and two lateral pieces protecting the gills. These lateral pieces are on the right side of the body; they have the same coloration as the body, but are outlined in black.

Three of its dorsal parts can be shed in case of danger, a form of autotomy. This species has another means of defense by secreting a repellent acid fluid.

The head has a pair of smooth and slightly folded rhinophores. A trapezoid veil masks partially the oral cavity.

The egg ribbon is whitish.

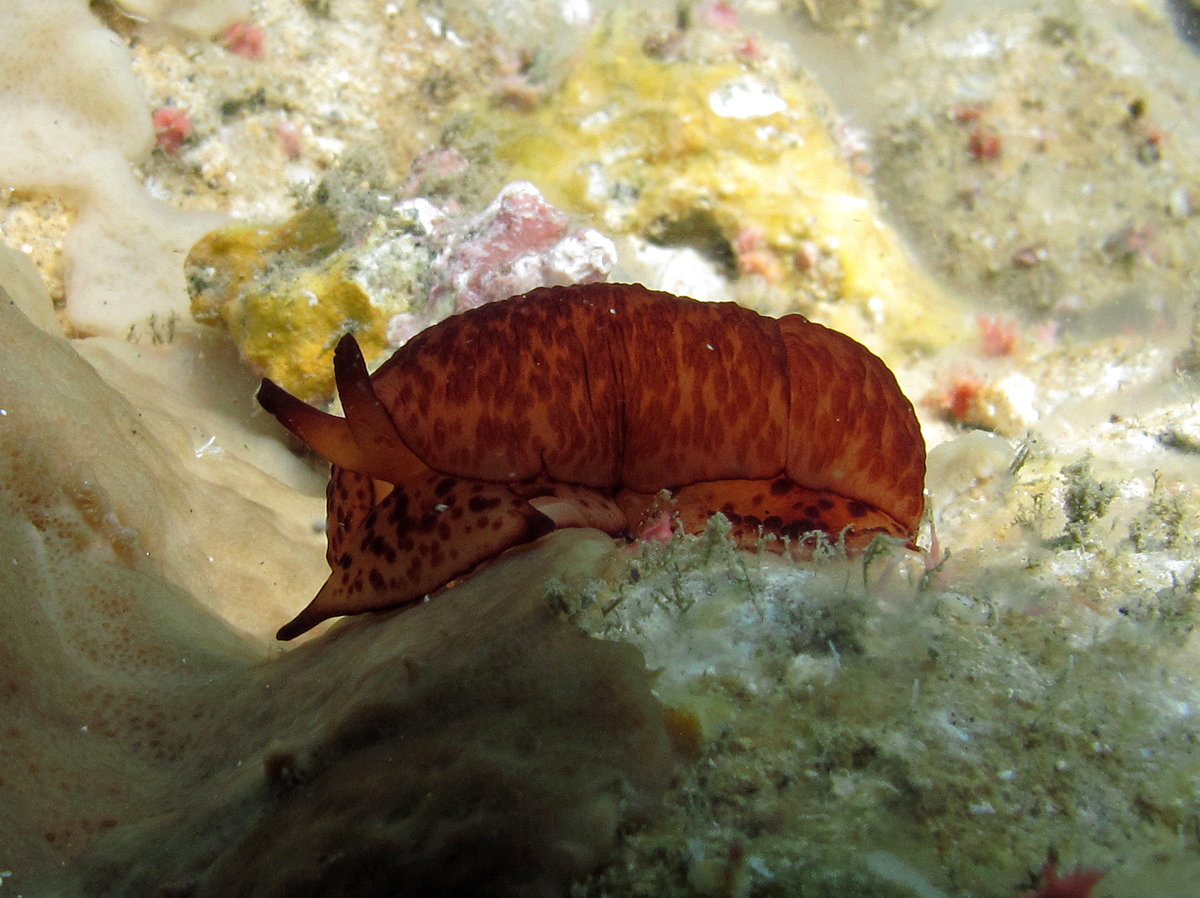

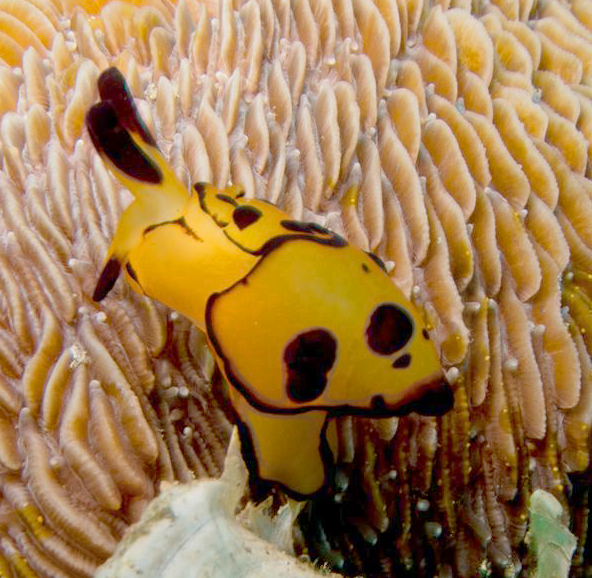

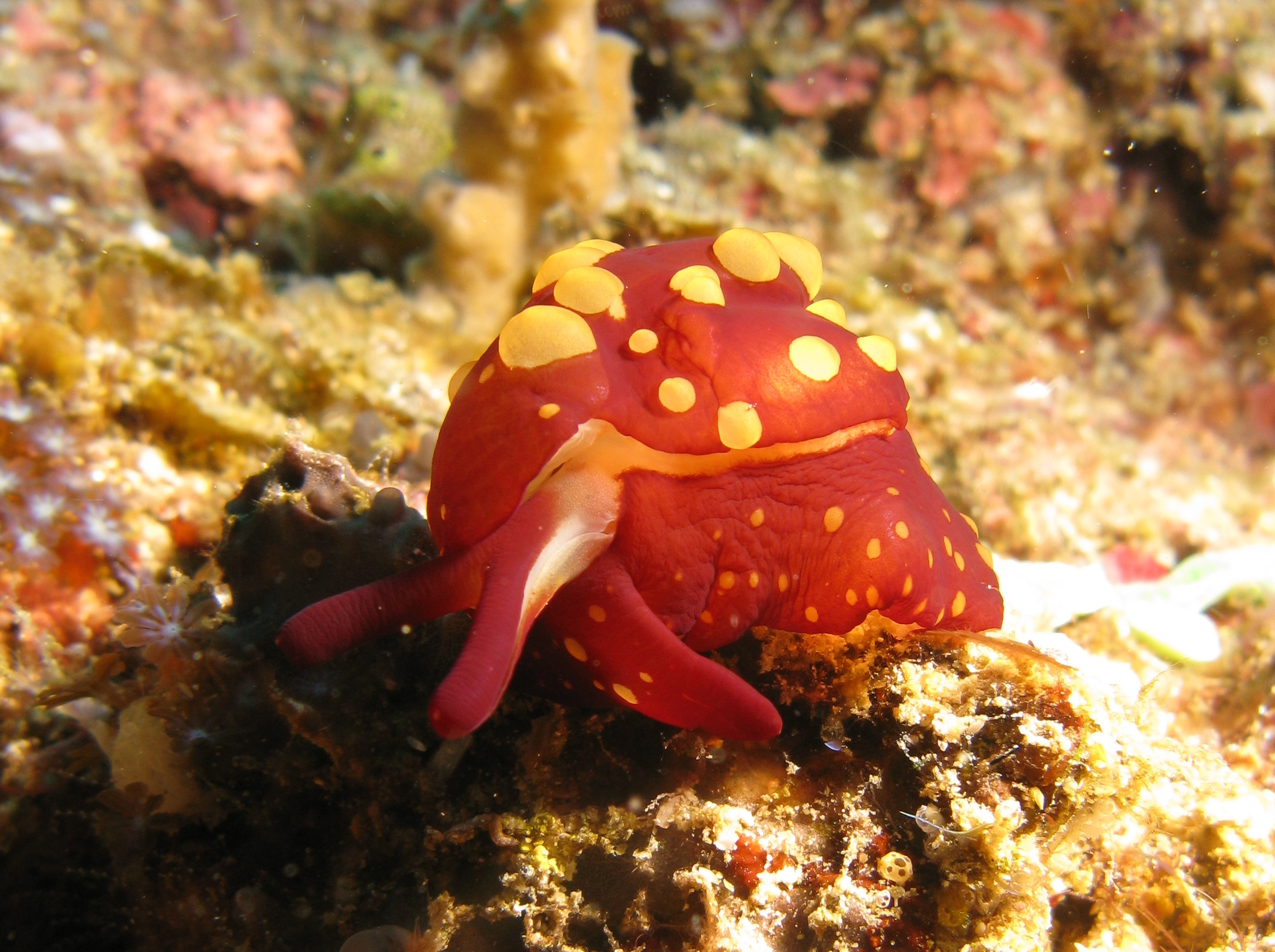

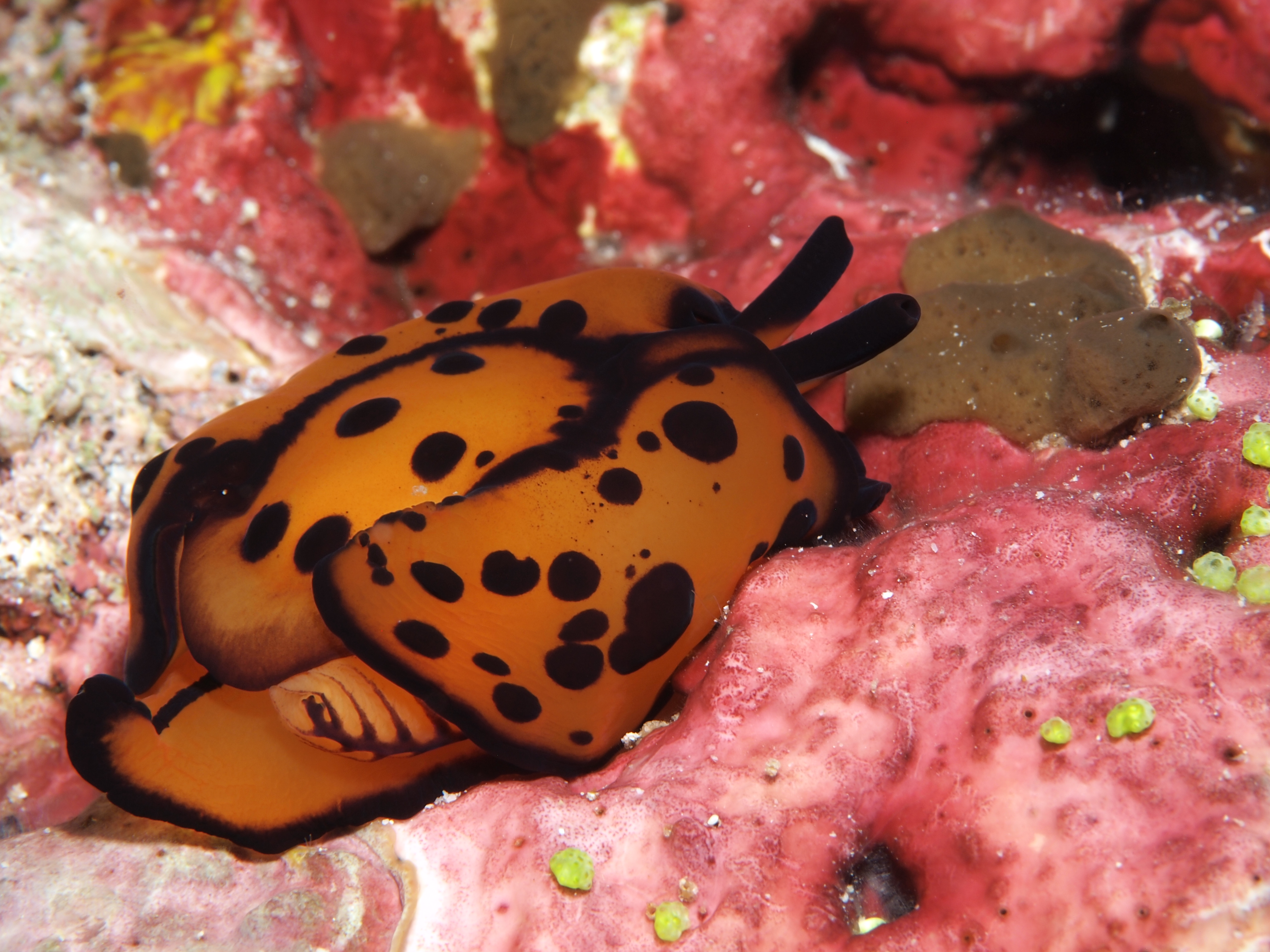

== Distribution and habitat ==
This species is widely distributed throughout the tropical waters of the Indo-West Pacific. It is usually found among rubble of dead coral in lagoons, or top of the external reef slopes, from the intertidal zone to 25 m depth.

== Feeding ==
Tomoberthella martensi feeds on sponges and tunicates.

== Behaviour ==
This species is nocturnal.

== Bibliography ==
- Coleman,Marine life of the Maldives, Atoll editions,2004,ISBN 187641054X
- Beesley, Ross & Wells, Mollusca-The southern synthesis, vol.5, CSIRO, 1998, ISBN 0643057560
- Behrens,Nudibranch behaviour, New World Publication Inc, 2005, ISBN 9781878348418
- Cobb & Willan,Undersea jewels - a colour guide to nudibranchs, Australian Biological Resources Study, 2006, ISBN 0642568472
