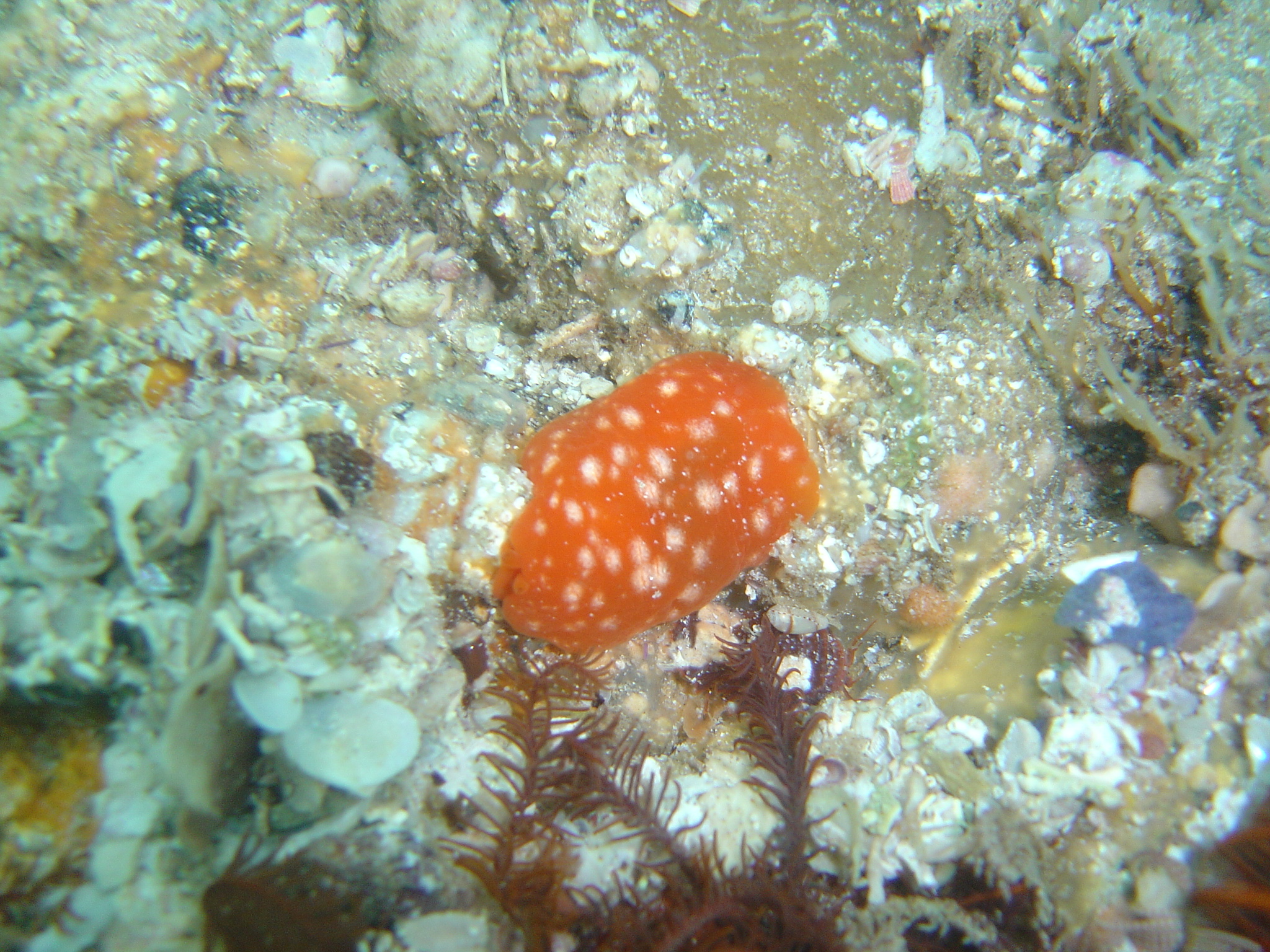
- A live individual of Berthellina granulata, in situ

Scientific classification
- Domain: Eukaryota
- Kingdom: Animalia
- Phylum: Mollusca
- Class: Gastropoda
- Order: Pleurobranchida
- Family: Pleurobranchidae
- Genus: Berthellina; Gardiner, 1936

= Berthellina =

Genus of gastropods

Berthellina is a genus of sea slugs, marine gastropod molluscs in the family Pleurobranchidae.

== Species ==
Species within the genus Berthellina are:

- Berthellina barquini Ortea, 2014
- Berthellina circularis (Mörch, 1863)
- Berthellina citrina (Rüppell & Leuckart, 1828)
- Berthellina cuvieri (Bergh, 1898)
- Berthellina delicata (Pease, 1861)
- Berthellina edwardsii (Vayssière, 1897)
- Berthellina granulata (Krauss, 1848) – lemon pleurobranch
- Berthellina ignis Alvim & Pimenta, 2015
- Berthellina ilisima Marcus & Marcus, 1967
- Berthellina magma Ortea, 2014
- Berthellina minor (Bergh, 1905)
- Berthellina oblonga (Audouin, 1826)
- Berthellina quadridens (Mörch, 1863)
- Berthellina utris Ortea, Moro & Caballer, 2014

=== Species inquirenda ===
- Berthellina engeli Gardiner, 1936 - (taxon inquirendum)
