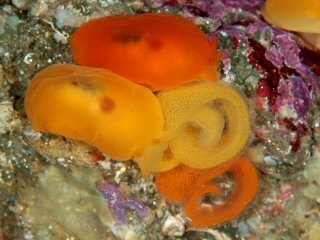

Scientific classification
- Domain: Eukaryota
- Kingdom: Animalia
- Phylum: Mollusca
- Class: Gastropoda
- Order: Pleurobranchida
- Family: Pleurobranchidae
- Genus: Berthellina
- Species: B. citrina

Binomial name
- Berthellina citrina (Ruppell & Leuckart, 1828)

Synonyms
- Berthella brocki Vayssière, 1897; Berthella citrina (Rüppell & Leuckart, 1828); Gymnotoplax citrina Marcus, 1957; Pleurobranchus citrinus Rüppell & Leuckart, 1828; Pleurobranchus punctatus Quoy & Gaimard, 1832

= Berthellina citrina =

Species of sea slug

Berthellina citrina, or the orange gumdrop, is a species of sea slug in the family Pleurobranchidae. It is found in rock pools in the intertidal zone and in shallow water in the tropical and subtropical Indo-Pacific region.

== Description ==
Berthellina citrina grows to a maximum length of about 3 cm (1.2 in) and has a broadly ovate body. It varies in colour from a translucent pale yellow to a brick red. The head bears a triangular oral veil with a ventral groove, and a pair of rhinophores rolled into tubes. The surface of the mantle is studded with small white glands which produce a distasteful whitish secretion. The remnants of the shell are embedded in the mantle and the gut is visible through the overlying tissues. There is a single gill located in a gap between the mantle and the foot on the right-hand side, with around twenty pectinate lamellae on each side.

== Distribution and habitat ==
Berthellina citrina is a common species found throughout the tropical and subtropical Indo-Pacific, and as far south as New Zealand. As well as being found in rock pools, it occurs on reefs and among boulders in the shallow subtidal zone, and down to a maximum depth of 150 m (500 ft). It is nocturnal and hides in crevices and under rocks during the day.

== Ecology ==
Sea slugs in this family mostly feed on sponges, and Berthellina citrina is no exception. In Hawaii, however, it has been observed feeding on the corals Tubastrea coccinea, Leptastrea sp. and Porites lobata, and it also consumes detritus. The glandular secretion is released when the mantle surface is stimulated and is acidic, containing chlorine and sulphate ions. It is used as a defence against predators, and in laboratory experiments repelled sea anemones, fish, and crustaceans. Sea slugs in the Pleurobranchidae are hermaphrodites. The eggs are laid in an orange spiral jelly-like egg ribbon.
