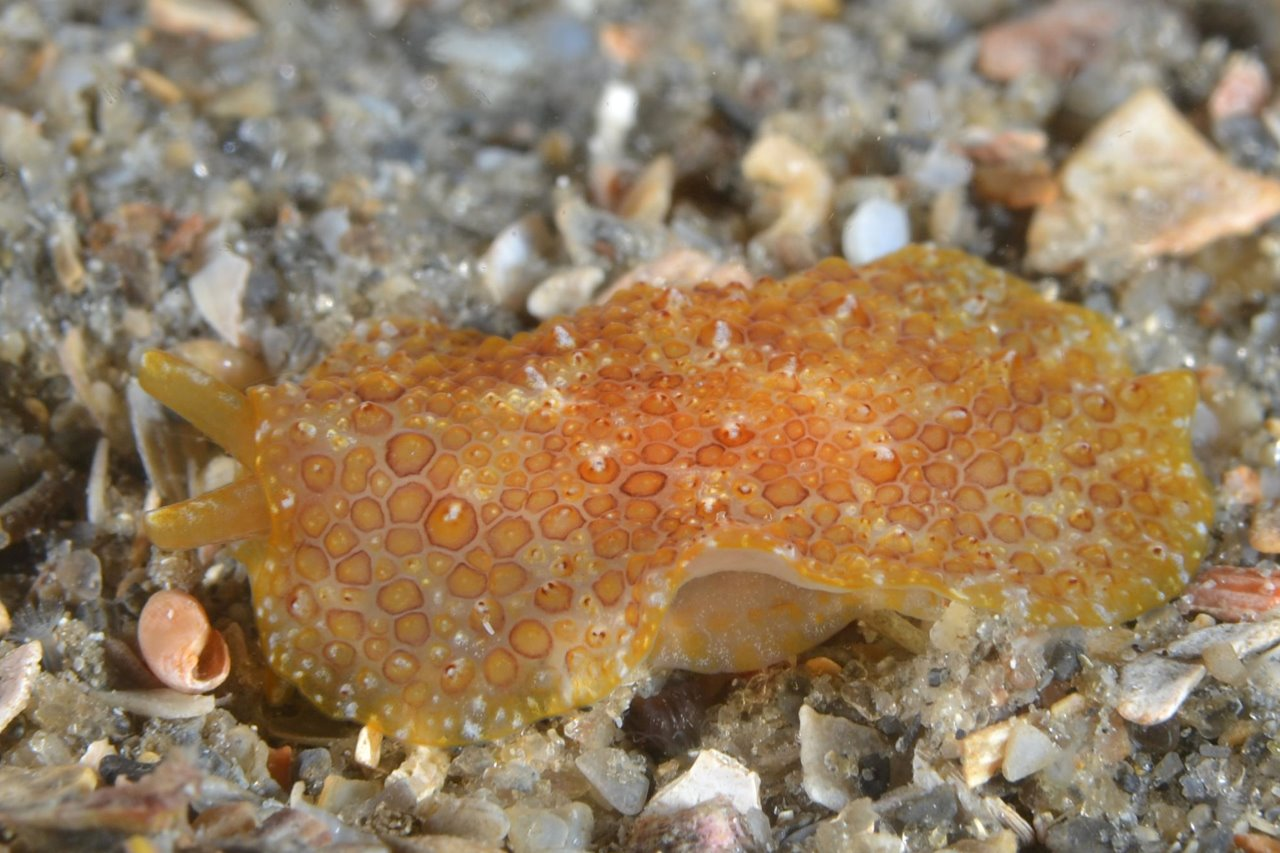

Scientific classification
- Kingdom: Animalia
- Phylum: Mollusca
- Class: Gastropoda
- Order: Pleurobranchida
- Family: Pleurobranchidae
- Genus: Pleurobranchus
- Species: P. crossei

Binomial name
- Pleurobranchus crossei Vayssière, 1897

Synonyms
- Pleurobranchus (Pleurobranchus) crossei Vayssière, 1897

= Pleurobranchus crossei =

Species of gastropod

Pleurobranchus crossei is a species of pleurobranchid sea slug, a type of marine gastropod mollusc.

== Description ==
The size of the holotype is 22 mm.

== Distribution ==
This species is commonly found in the Caribbean Sea.
