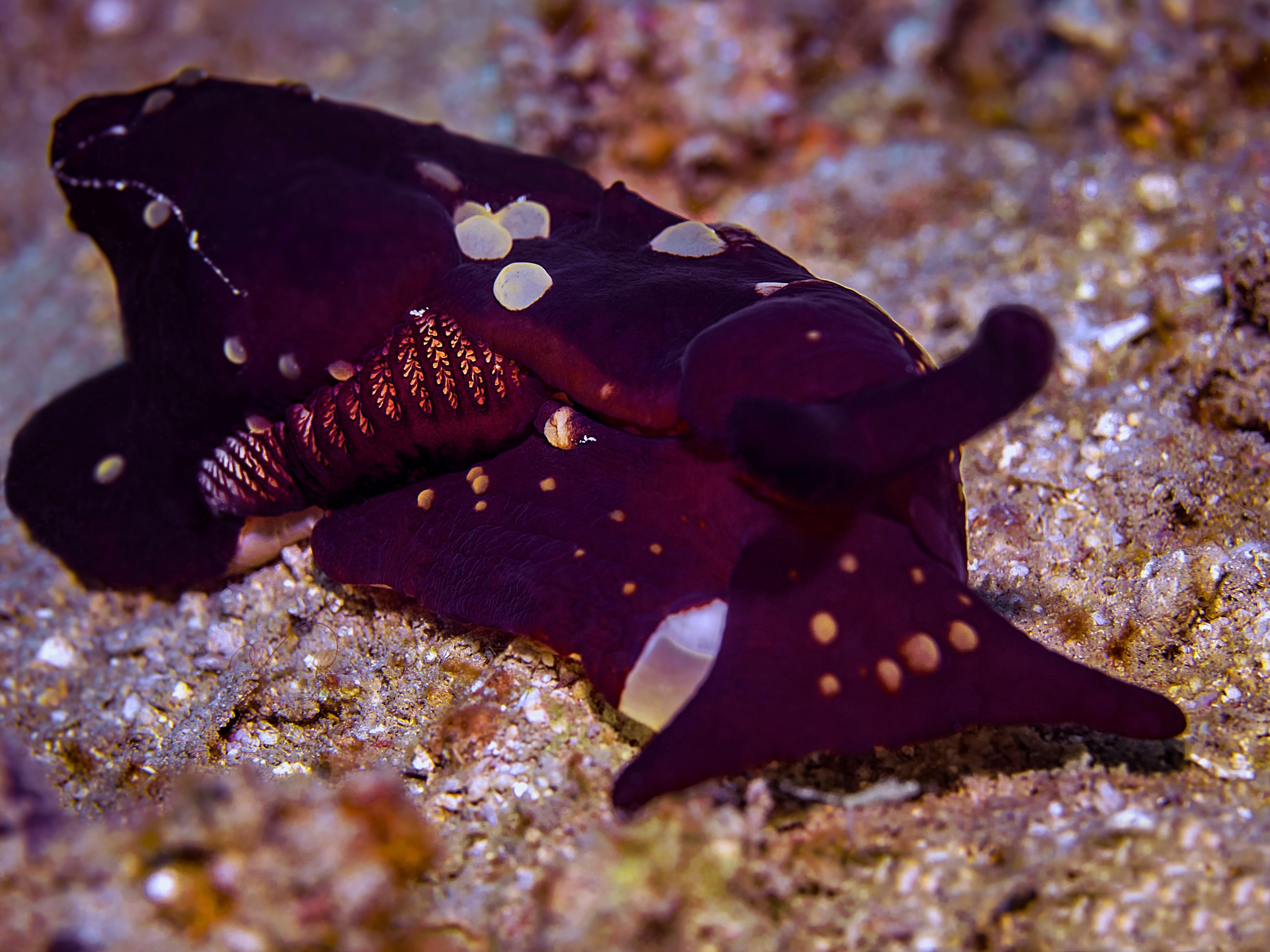
- Tomoberthella martensi, with lateral gill visible

Scientific classification
- Kingdom: Animalia
- Phylum: Mollusca
- Class: Gastropoda
- Order: Pleurobranchida
- Superfamily: Pleurobranchoidea
- Family: Pleurobranchidae; Gray, 1827

Type genus
- Pleurobranchus Cuvier, 1804

Genera
- See text

Synonyms
- Bathyberthellini Garcia, Troncoso, Cervera & Garcia-Gomez, 1996; Berthellinae Burn, 1962; Pleurobranchinae Gray, 1827

= Pleurobranchidae =

Family of gastropods

Pleurobranchidae is a taxonomic family of sea slugs, marine gastropod molluscs, in the order Pleurobranchida.

== Characteristics ==
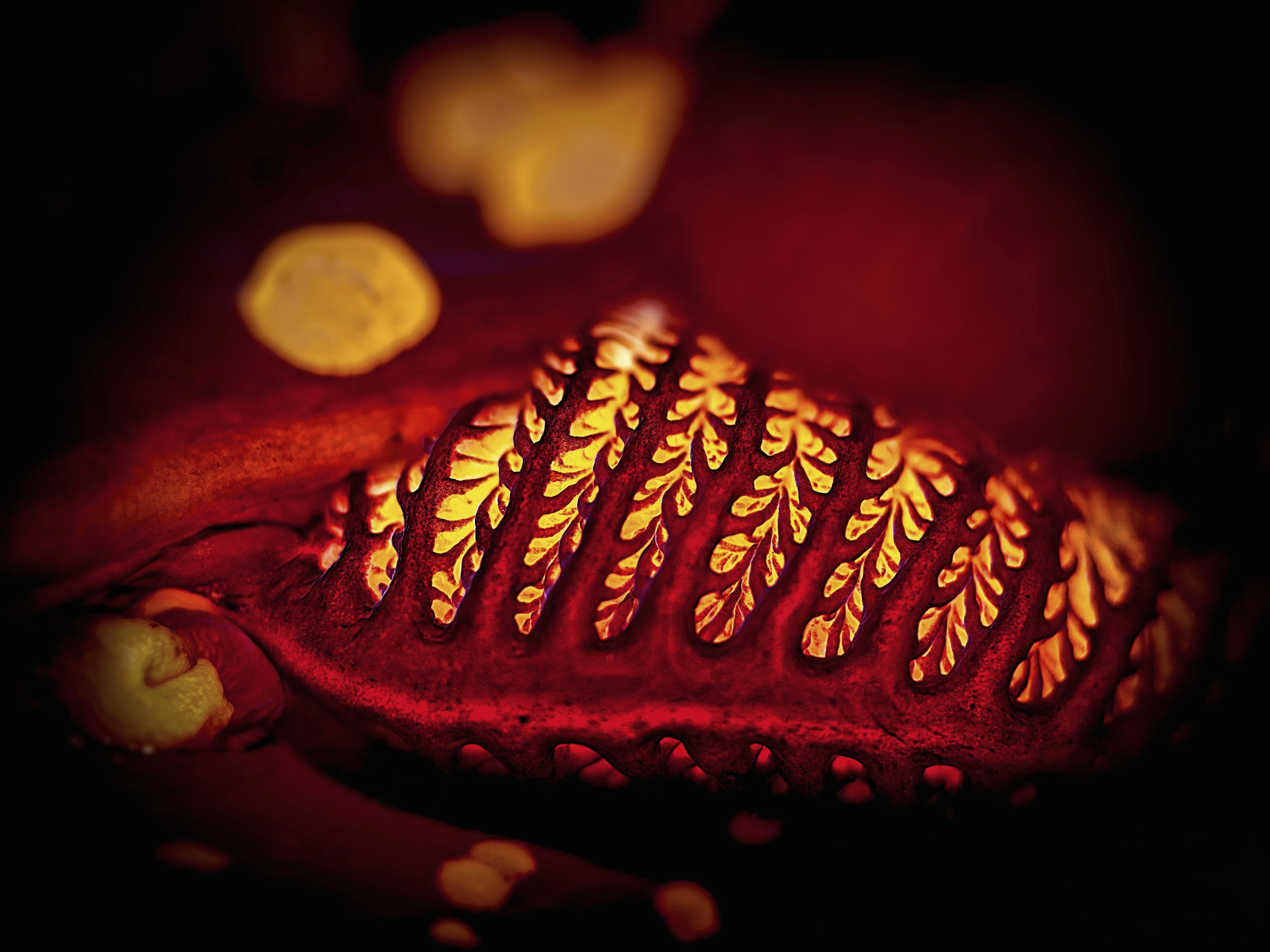
Close-up on the lateral gill of a pleurobranch sea slug (Tomoberthella martensi)

Species in the family Pleurobranchidae have a prominent mantle and an internal shell that becomes reduced or is lost completely in adults. Some adult species have been seen feeding on ascidians. Larval pleurobranchids can be planktotrophic (feeding on plankton), lecithotrophic (deriving nutrition from yolk), or direct developing.

Like all Pleurobranchomorpha, they breathe through an external gill, located on the right side (contrary to nudibranchs who have it on the back), just after the genital organ.

Many species produce secretions from their rich glandular mantle as a chemical defense against predators. Even the production of sulfuric acid has been reported.

== Taxonomy ==
Until 2005, this family was placed in the suborder Notaspidea. However, in the taxonomy of Bouchet & Rocroi (2005), the family Pleurobranchidae was placed in the superfamily Pleurobranchoidea. This superfamily was placed as the sole member of the subclade Pleurobranchomorpha, sister to the subclade Nudibranchia within the clade Nudipleura.

In 2017, Bouchet and colleagues emended the spelling and rank of Pleurobranchomorpha to order Pleurobranchida and separated some of the members of Pleurobranchidae into the additional families Pleurobranchaeidae and Quijotidae, all within the superfamily Pleurobranchoidea.

The following genera and respective species are recognised in the family Pleurobranchidae:

- Bathyberthella Willan, 1983
  - Bathyberthella antarctica Willan & Bertsch, 1987
  - Bathyberthella orcadensis (F. J. García, García-Gómez, Troncoso & Cervera, 1994)
  - Bathyberthella tomasi (F. J. García, Troncoso, Cervera & García-Gómez, 1996)
  - Bathyberthella zelandiae Willan, 1983
- Berthella Blainville, 1824
  - Berthella africana (Pruvot-Fol, 1953)
  - Berthella agassizii (MacFarland, 1909)
  - Berthella americana (A. E. Verrill, 1885)
  - † Berthella aquitaniensis Á. Valdés & Lozouet, 2000
  - † Berthella arctata Pacaud, 2015
  - † Berthella ateles Á. Valdés & Lozouet, 2000
  - Berthella aurantiaca (Risso, 1818)
  - Berthella caledonica (Risbec, 1928)
  - Berthella elongata (Cantraine, 1835)
  - Berthella grovesi Hermosillo & Á. Valdés, 2008
  - † Berthella jodiae Pacaud, 2015
  - Berthella medietas Burn, 1962
  - Berthella ocellata (Delle Chiaje, 1830)
  - Berthella ornata (Cheeseman, 1878)
  - Berthella patagonica (A. d'Orbigny, 1836)
  - Berthella perforata (R. A. Philippi, 1844)
  - Berthella platei (Bergh, 1898)
  - Berthella plumula (Montagu, 1803)
  - † Berthella pristina Pacaud, 2015
  - Berthella punctata Alvim & Pimenta, 2015
  - Berthella schroedli Araya & Á. Valdés, 2016
  - Berthella serenitas (Burn, 1962)
  - Berthella sideralis Lovén, 1846
  - Berthella spatula Ortea, Moro & Caballer, 2014
  - Berthella tamiu Ev. Marcus, 1984
- Berthellina Gardiner, 1936
  - Berthellina barquini Ortea, 2014
  - Berthellina circularis (Mörch, 1863)
  - Berthellina citrina (Rüppell & Leuckart, 1828)
  - Berthellina cuvieri (Bergh, 1898)
  - Berthellina delicata (Pease, 1861)
  - Berthellina edwardsii (Vayssière, 1897)
  - Berthellina granulata (Krauss, 1848)
  - Berthellina ignis Alvim & Pimenta, 2015
  - Berthellina ilisima Ev. Marcus & Er. Marcus, 1967
  - Berthellina magma Ortea, 2014
  - Berthellina minor (Bergh, 1905)
  - Berthellina punctata (Quoy & Gaimard, 1832)
  - Berthellina quadridens (Mörch, 1863)
  - Berthellina utris Ortea, Moro & Caballer, 2014
- Boreoberthella Martynov & Schrödl, 2009
  - Boreoberthella augusta Martynov & Schrödl, 2009
  - Boreoberthella californica (Dall, 1900)
  - Boreoberthella chacei (J. Q. Burch, 1944)
- Pleurehdera Er. Marcus & Ev. Marcus, 1970
  - Pleurehdera andromeda (Ghanimi, Schrödl, Goddard, Ballesteros, Gosliner & Á. Valdés, 2020)
  - Pleurehdera haraldi Er. Marcus & Ev. Marcus, 1970
  - Pleurehdera nebula (Ghanimi, Schrödl, Goddard, Ballesteros, Gosliner & Á. Valdés, 2020)
  - Pleurehdera pellucida (Pease, 1860)
  - Pleurehdera postrema (Burn, 1962)
  - Pleurehdera stellata (Risso, 1826)
  - Pleurehdera strongi (MacFarland, 1966)
  - Pleurehdera vialactea (Ghanimi, Schrödl, Goddard, Ballesteros, Gosliner & Á. Valdés, 2020)
- Pleurobranchus Cuvier, 1804
  - Pleurobranchus albiguttatus (Bergh, 1905)
  - Pleurobranchus areolatus Mörch, 1863
  - Pleurobranchus crossei Vayssière, 1897
  - Pleurobranchus digueti Rochebrune, 1895
  - Pleurobranchus evelinae T. E. Thompson, 1977
  - Pleurobranchus forskalii Rüppell & Leuckart, 1828
  - Pleurobranchus grandis Pease, 1868
  - Pleurobranchus hilli (Hedley, 1894)
  - Pleurobranchus iouspi Ev. Marcus, 1984
  - Pleurobranchus lacteus Dall & C. T. Simpson, 1901
  - Pleurobranchus mamillatus Quoy & Gaimard, 1832
  - Pleurobranchus membranaceus (Montagu, 1816)
  - Pleurobranchus nigropunctatus (Bergh, 1907)
  - Pleurobranchus niveus (A. E. Verrill, 1901)
  - Pleurobranchus obses K. White, 1946
  - Pleurobranchus peronii Cuvier, 1804
  - Pleurobranchus reticulatus Rang, 1832
  - Pleurobranchus sishaensis (S.-P. Zhang & G.-Y. Lin, 1965)
  - Pleurobranchus testudinarius Cantraine, 1835
  - Pleurobranchus varians Pease, 1860
  - Pleurobranchus weberi (Bergh, 1905)
- Tomoberthella Moles, Brenzinger, Berning, Martynov, Korshunova & Schrödl, 2023
  - Tomoberthella martensi (Pilsbry, 1896)
