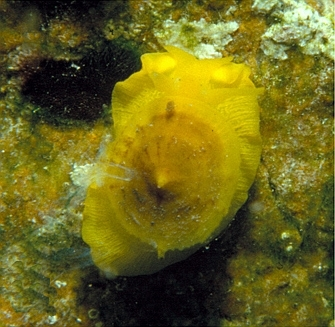
- A live individual of Tylodina perversa, in situ, head uppermost in this image

Scientific classification
- Domain: Eukaryota
- Kingdom: Animalia
- Phylum: Mollusca
- Class: Gastropoda
- Clade: Euopisthobranchia
- Family: Tylodinidae
- Genus: Tylodina; Rafinesque, 1814

= Tylodina =

Tylodina perversa

Genus of gastropods

Tylodina is a genus of medium-sized sea snails or false limpets in the family Tylodinidae.

== Species ==
Species within the genus Tylodina include:

- Tylodina americana
- Tylodina corticalis
- Tylodina fungina- Observed solitary, in pairs and aggregating in small groups in reefs around San Clemente Island, the southernmost Channel Islands off the coast of Southern California July 2015.
- Tylodina perversa
