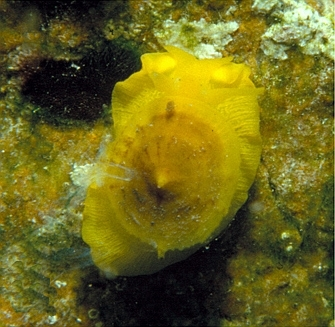
- A live individual of Tylodina perversa, head end towards the top

Scientific classification
- Kingdom: Animalia
- Phylum: Mollusca
- Class: Gastropoda
- Clade: Euopisthobranchia
- Family: Tylodinidae
- Genus: Tylodina
- Species: T. perversa

Binomial name
- Tylodina perversa (Gmelin, 1791)

= Tylodina perversa =

Species of gastropod

Tylodina perversa, common names the "yellow tylodina" or "yellow umbrella slug", is a species of sea snail or false limpet, a marine opisthobranch gastropod mollusk in the family Tylodinidae.

This opisthobranch has a limpet-like shell which is composed primarily of protein, not calcium carbonate.

== Distribution ==
This species of false limpet occurs in the northeastern Atlantic including the British Isles and the Mediterranean Sea.

== Ecology ==
T. perversa feeds on the sponge species Aplysina aerophoba.

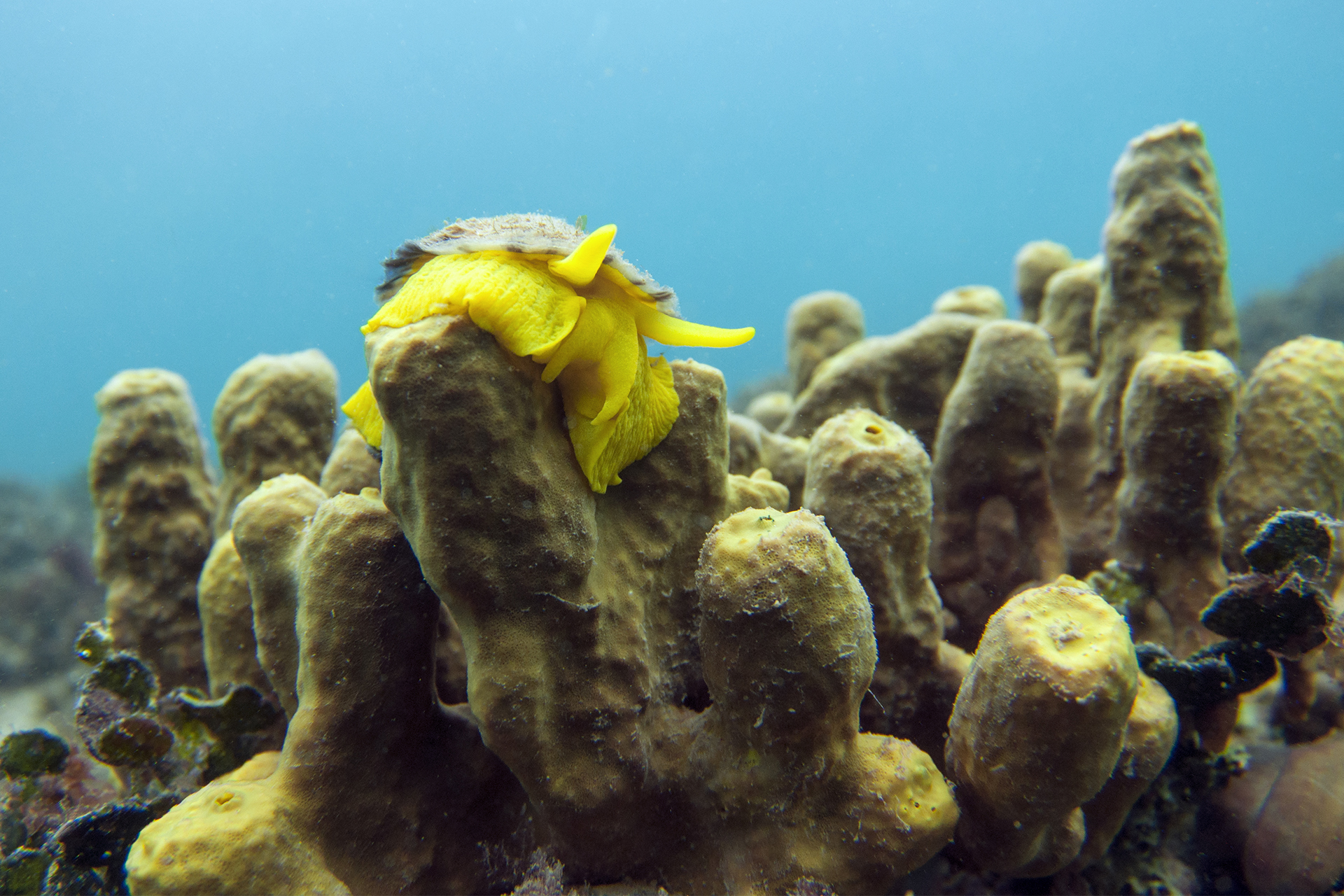
Tylodina perversa on the Aplysina aerophoba, in Ližnjan, Croatia

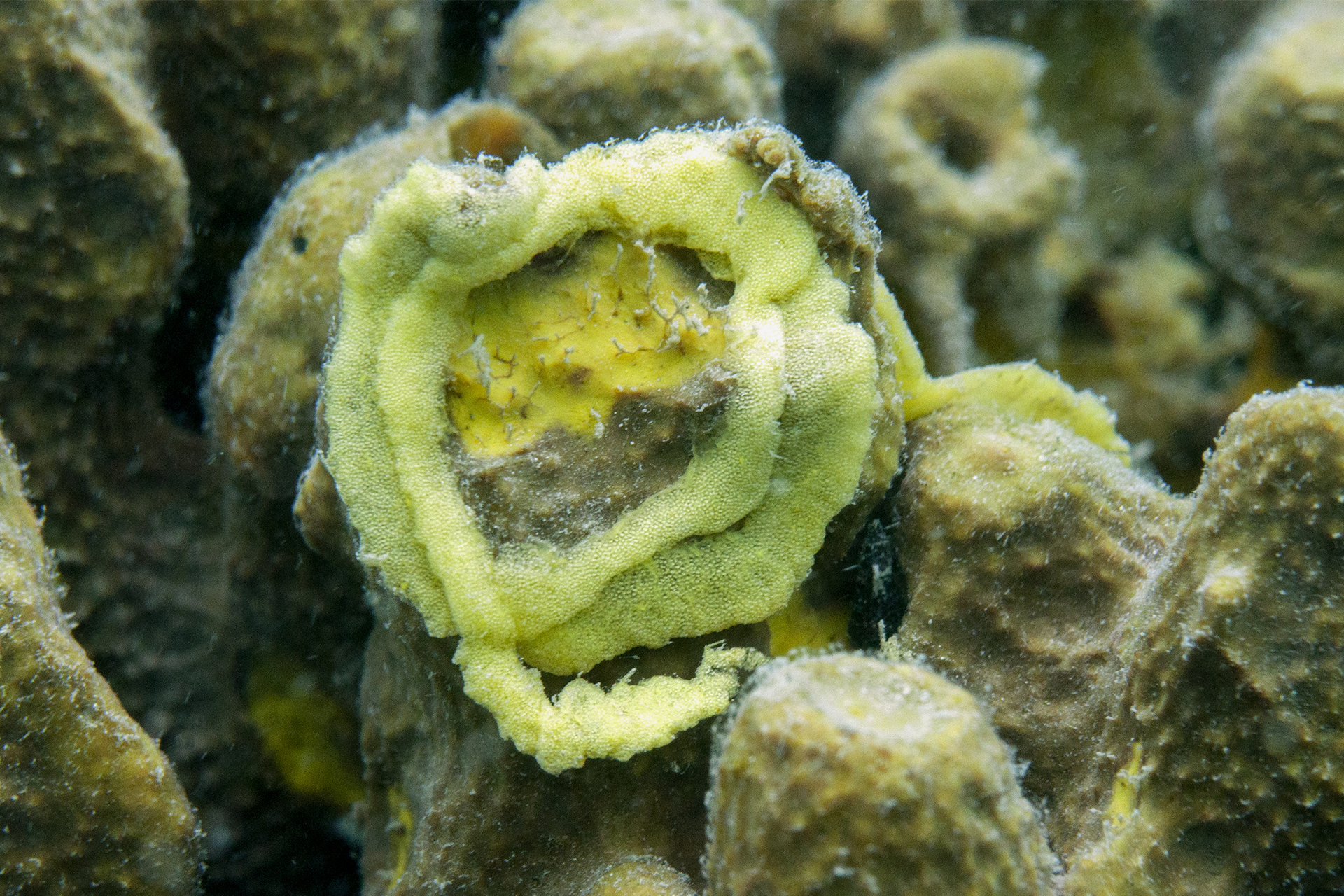
Spiral egg ribbon of the Tylodina perversa, in Ližnjan, Croatia

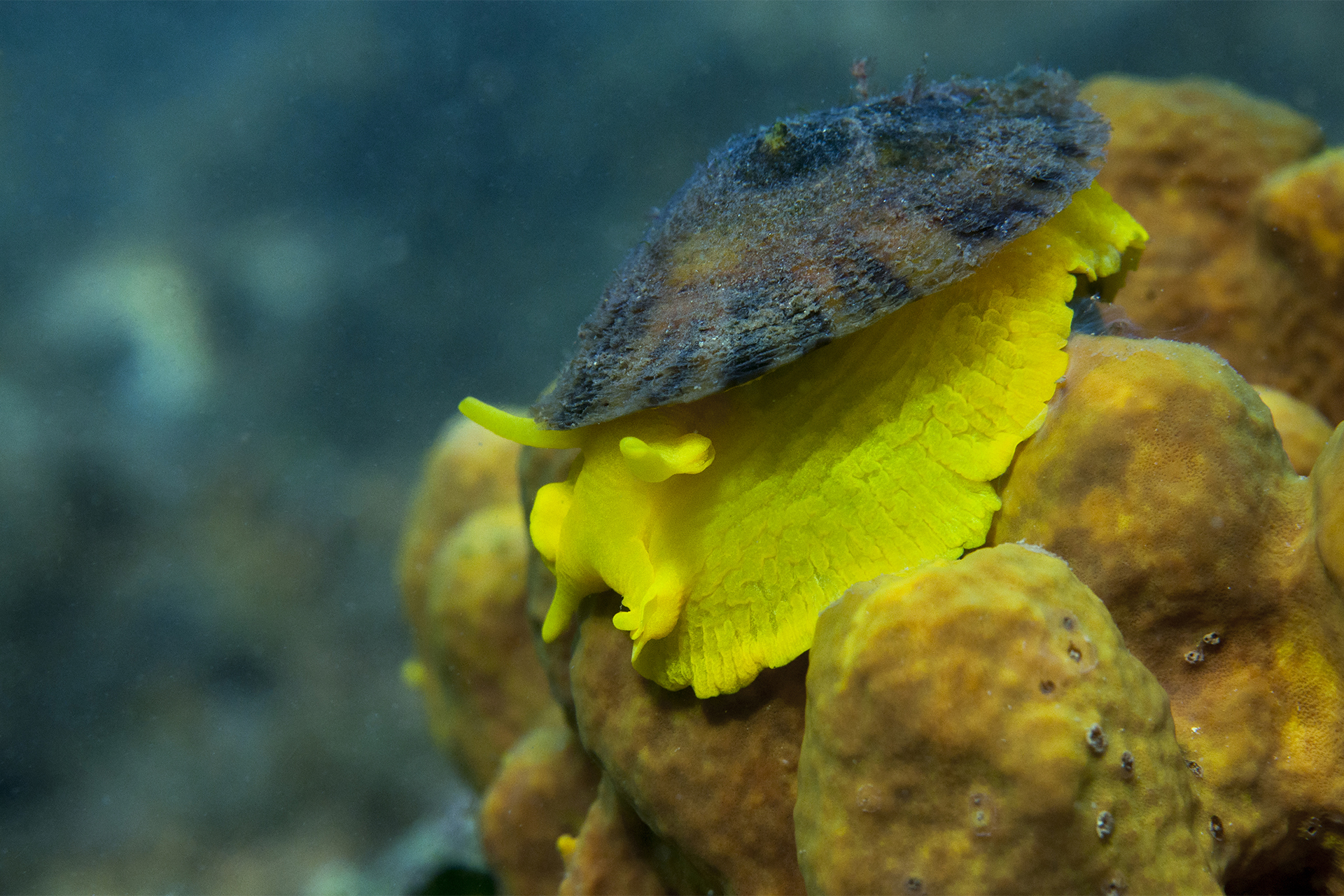
Close-up of the Tylodina perversa, in Ližnjan, Croatia
