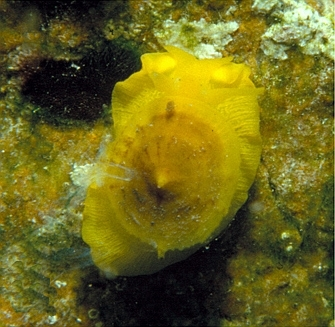
- A live individual of Tylodina perversa

Scientific classification
- Kingdom: Animalia
- Phylum: Mollusca
- Class: Gastropoda
- Clade: Euopisthobranchia
- Superfamily: Umbraculoidea
- Family: Tylodinidae; Gray, 1847

Genera
- See text

= Tylodinidae =

Family of gastropods

Tylodinidae is a family of sea snails or false limpets, marine opisthobranch gastropod molluscs in the superfamily Umbraculoidea.

== Taxonomy ==
The family Tylodinidae is currently placed in the superfamily Umbraculoidea within the clade Euopisthobranchia.

According to the World Register of Marine Species (WoRMS), the family contains only one accepted genus (Anidolyta and several other names are junior synonyms of Tylodina).

=== Genera ===
- Tylodina Rafinesque, 1814 (type genus)

=== Species ===
The following seven species are currently accepted in the genus Tylodina:

- Tylodina americana Dall, 1890
- Tylodina corticalis (Tate, 1889)
- Tylodina duebenii Lovén, 1846
- Tylodina fungina Gabb, 1865
- Tylodina perversa (Gmelin, 1791)
- Tylodina rafinesquii R. A. Philippi, 1836
- Tylodina spongotheras (Bertsch, 1980)
