= Heinrich Carl Küster =

German malacologist (1807-1876)

- Born: 14 February 1807
- Died: April 1876 (aged 69)
- Scientific career
- Fields: malacology

Heinrich Carl Küster (14 February 1807 – April 1876) was a German malacologist and entomologist.

From 1836, he worked as an instructor at a trade school (Gewerbschule) in Erlangen. He conducted scientific excursions in Sardinia (1831) as well as in Dalmatia and Montenegro (1840–41).

He was the originator of "Die Käfer Europas, nach der Natur beschrieben" (Beetles of Europe, described from nature), a multi-volume series (1844-1912) that was continued by Ernst Gustav Kraatz and Friedrich Julius Schilsky. Also, he provided drawings for Carl Wilhelm Hahn's ornithological work, "Voegel, aus Asien, Africa, America, und Neuholland, in Abbildungen nach der Natur mit Beschreibungen".

== Bibliography ==
- Die Ohrschnecken in Abbildungen nach der Natur mit Beschreibungen, Nürnberg Bauer & Raspe 1844 – Abalones in illustrations from nature with descriptions.
- Die Bulimiden und Achatinen in Abbildungen nach der Natur mit Beschreibungen, Nürnberg Bauer & Raspe 1845 – Bulimidae and Achatinidae in illustrations from nature with descriptions.
- Die Gattungen Umbrella und Tylodina, Nürnberg Bauer & Raspe 1862 – The genera Umbrella and Tylodina.
- (in German) Küster H. C. (1852). "Die Gattungen Paludina, Hydrocaena und Valvata". Systematisches Conchylien-Cabinet von Martini und Chemnitz: 1-56. Nurnberg, Bauer und Raspe. scan.
