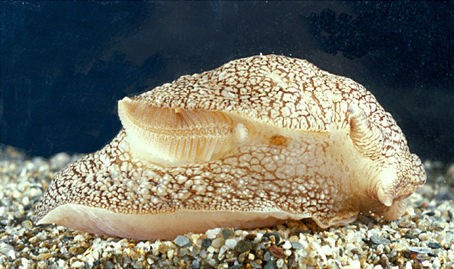
- A live individual of Pleurobranchaea meckelii; the gill (or ctenidium) is visible in this view of the right-hand side of the animal

Scientific classification
- Kingdom: Animalia
- Phylum: Mollusca
- Class: Gastropoda
- Informal group: Opisthobranchia
- Suborder: Notaspidea; P. Fischer, 1883

= Notaspidea =

Group of molluscs

Notaspidea, also known as the sidegill slugs, is an artificial grouping of sea slugs which is now split into two unrelated groups, the Umbraculida and the Pleurobranchomorpha.

== Taxonomic history ==
Notaspidea, also known as the sidegill slugs, was a suborder which included both sea slugs and sea snails or false limpets, marine opisthobranch gastropod molluscs in the subclass Orthogastropoda. However, in the newer taxonomy of Bouchet & Rocroi (2005), the families Umbraculidae and Tylodinidae belong to the superfamily Umbraculoidea Dall, 1889, part of the clade Umbraculida. Grande et al. (2004) found Umbraculoidea to be a sister clade to the Cephalaspidea (Acteonoidea excluded).

The families Tylodinidae and Umbraculidae have large limpet-like external shells and a small mantle, while the species in the family Pleurobranchidae have a prominent mantle and an internal shell that becomes reduced or is lost in adults. Many species produce mantle secretions as a chemical defense against predators

== Families ==
- Pleurobranchidae Menke, 1828
- Tylodinidae Gray, 1847
- Umbraculidae Dall, 1889
