= List of marine heterobranch gastropods of South Africa =

Saltwater mollusc species in South Africa

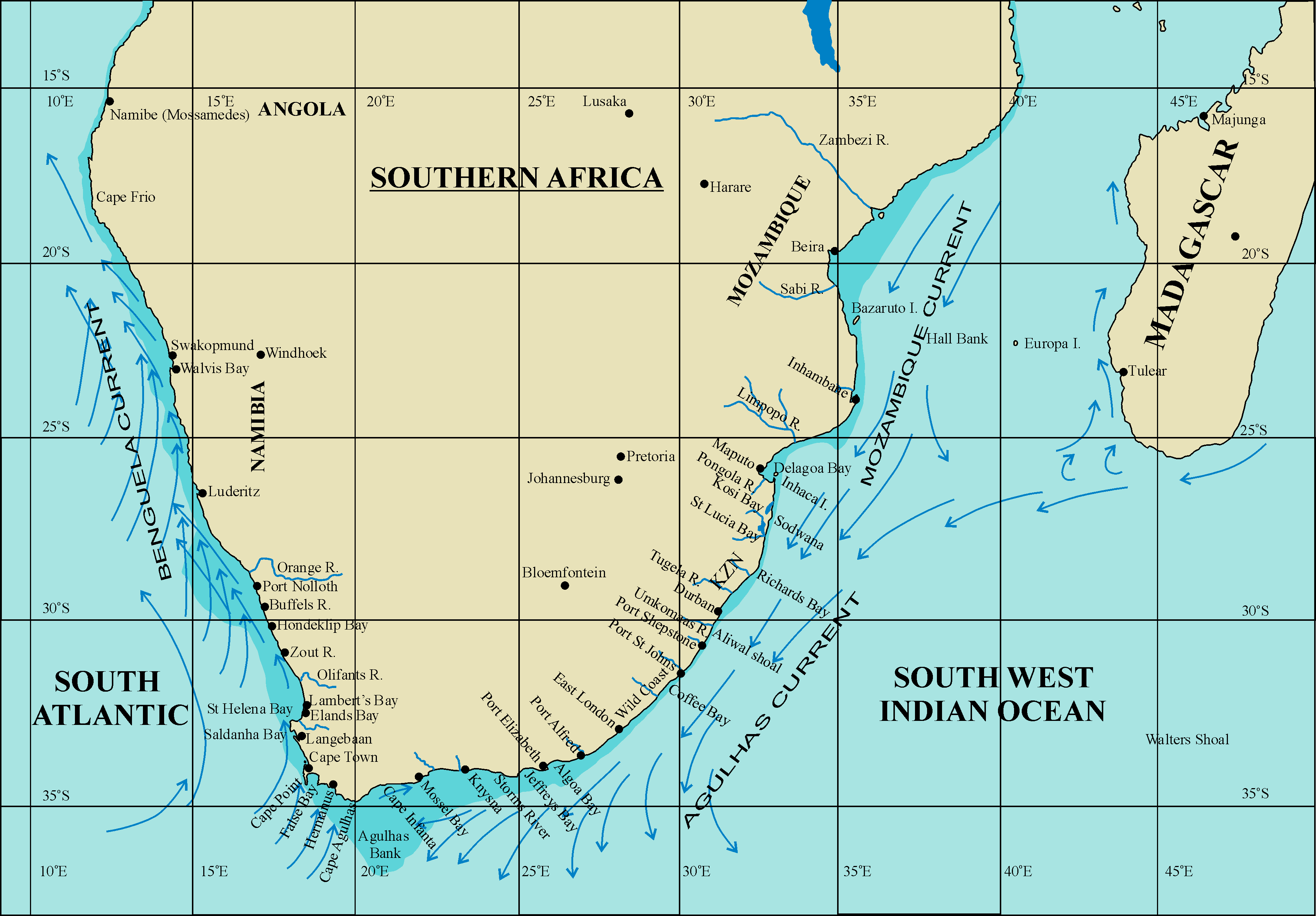
Map of the Southern African coastline showing some of the landmarks referred to in species range statements

The list of marine heterobranch gastropods of South Africa is a list of saltwater mollusc species that form a part of the molluscan fauna of South Africa. This list does not include the land or freshwater molluscs.

This is a sub-list of the list of marine gastropods of South Africa, which is in turn a sub-list of the list of marine molluscs of South Africa.

Heterobranchia, the heterobranchs (meaning "different gill"), is a taxonomic clade of snails and slugs, which includes marine, aquatic, and terrestrial gastropod molluscs.

Heterobranchia is one of the main clades of gastropods. Currently Heterobranchia comprises two groups: the opisthobranchs, and the pulmonates. (Full article...)

== Heterobranchia ==
Architectonicidae

- Variegated sundial shell Heliacus variegatus (Gmelin, 1791) (Eastern Cape to Mozambique)

Siphonariidae - False limpets

- Siphonaria annaea Tomlin, 1944 (Durban northwards)
- Cape False limpet Siphonaria capensis Quoy and Gaimard (Namibia to northern KwaZulu-Natal)
- Siphonaria compressa Allanson, 1958
- Siphonaria concinna Sowerby, 1824 (Cape Point to Zululand)
- Siphonaria nigerrima Smith, 1903 (Zululand to Mozambique)
- Siphonaria oculus Krauss, 1848 (Cape Point to Zululand)
- Siphonaria serrata Fischer, 1807 (Saldanha Bay to Zululand)
- Siphonaria tenuicostulata Smith, 1903 (Durban to Mozambique)

Ringiculidae

- Ringicula turtoni Bartsch, 1915

Acteonidae

- Acteon fortis Thiele, 1925
- Acteon flammeus (Gmelin, 1791)
- Acteon pudicus (A. Adams, 1854)
- Rictaxis albis (Sowerby, 1873)
- Japonacteon sp.
- Pupa affinis (A. Adams, 1854)
- Pupa niecaensis (Barnard, 1963)
- Pupa solidula (Linnaeus, 1758)
- Pupa sulcata (Gmelin, 1791)
- Pupa suturalis (A. Adams, 1854)
- Pupa tessellata (Reeve, 1842)

Bullinidae

- Bullina scabra Gmelin, 1791
- Bullina oblonga Sowerby, 1897

Hydatinidae

- Polka-dot bubble shell Micromelo undata (Brughiere, 1792) (Transkei to Mozambique)
- Striped bubble shell Hydatina physis (Linnaeus, 1758) (Eastern Cape to Mozambique)
- Hydatina amplustre (Linnaeus, 1758)
- Hydatina velum (Gmelin, 1791)
- Hydatina albocincta (van der Hoeven, 1811)

Cylichnidae

- Cylichnella agulhasensis (Thiele, 1925)
- Cylichnella meridionalis (Smith, 1902)
- Cylichnella miniscula (Turton, 1932)
- Cylichnella natalensis (Barnard, 1963)
- Cylichnella nitens (Smith, 1872)
- Cylichnella smithi (Bartsch, 1915)
- Cylichna africana Bartsch, 1915
- Cylichna bistriata Tomlin, 1920
- Cylichna dulcis Thiele. 1925
- Cylichna nitens Smith, 1903
- Cylichna remissa Smith, 1890
- Cylichna tubulosa Gould, 1859
- Scaphander punctostriatus (Mighels. 1841)

Retusidae

- Retusa agulhasensis Thiele, 1925
- Retusa natalensis Barnard, 1963
- Retusa sp. cf. nicobarica Thiele, 1925
- Retusa sp. cf. semen Thiele, 1925
- Retusa truncatula Bruguiere, 1792
- Volvulella mutabilis (Barnard, 1963)
- Volvulella pia (Thiele, 1925)
- Volvulella rostrata (A. Adams, 1854)

Philinidae

- Sand slug Philine aperta (Linnaeus, 1767) (Cape Columbine to Mozambique)
- Philine berghi Smith, 1910

Gastropteridae

- Gastropteron flavobrunneum Gosliner, 1984
- Gastropteron alboaurantium Gosliner, 1984

Aglajidae

- Slipper slug Philinopsis capensis (Bergh, 1907)
- Philinopsis dubia (O'Donoghue, 1929)
- Philinopsis cyanea(Martens, 1879)
- Chelidonura fulvipunctata Baba, 1938
- Chelidonura hurundinina (Quoy and Gaimard, 1824)

Haminoeidae

- Atys cylindrica (Heibling, 1779)
- Green bubble shell Haminoea alfredensis Bartsch, 1915 (Namaqualand to Eastern Cape)
- Haminoea natalensis (Krauss, 1848) (KwaZulu-Natal)
- Roxania utriculus (Brocchi, 1814)
- Smaragdinella sieboldi A. Adams, 1864
- Smaragdinella calyculata (Broderip and Sowerby, 1829)
- Phenerophthalmus smaragdinus (Ruppell and Leuckart, 1831)

Runcinidae

- Metaruncina sp.

Bullidae

- Bulla ampulla (Linnaeus 1758)

Limacinidae

- Limacina bulimoides (Orbigny, 1836)
- Limacina antarctica Woodward, 1854 - mentioned in traditional views as Limacina helicina (Phipps, 1774) (cf.)
- Limacina inflata (Orbigny, 1836)
- Limacina lesueurii (Orbigny, 1836)
- Limacina trochiformis (Orbigny, 1836)

Cavoliniidae

- Cavolinia gibbosa (Orbigny, 1836)
- Cavolinia globosa (Gray, 1850)
- Cavolinia inflexa (Lesueur, 1813)
- Cavolinia tridentata (Niebuhr, 1775)
- Clio andreae (Boas, 1886)
- Clio chaptalii Gray, 1850
- Clio cuspidata (Bosc, 1802)
- Clio pyramidata Linnaeus, 1767
- Creseis acicula (Rang, 1828)
- Creseis virgula (Rang, 1828)
- Cuvierina columnella (Rang, 1827)
- Diacria quadridentata (Blainville, 1821)
- Diacria trispinosa (Blainville, 1821)
- Styliola subula (Quoy and Gaimard, 1827)

Peraclididae

- Peraclis moluccensis (Tesch, 1903)
- Peraclis reticulata (Orbigny, 1836)

Cymbuliidae

- Cymbulia sibogae Tesch, 1903
- Gleba cordata Niebuhr, 1776

Desmopteridae

- Desmopterus papilio Chun 1889

=== Gymnosomata ===
Clionidae

- Clione limacina (Phipps, 1774) (Pelagic northern and southern hemispheres) (southern hemisphere may be a distinct species, Clione antarctica)

Pneumodermatidae

- Spongiobranchaea australis (d'Orbigny, 1836) (Pelagic, southern hemisphere)

=== Anaspidea ===
Akeridae

- Akera soluta (Gmelin 1791)

Aplysiidae

- Dwarf sea hare Aplysia parvula Morch, 1863
- Spotted sea hare Aplysia oculifera Adams and Reeve, 1850 (Cape Point to northern KwaZulu-Natal)
- Aplysia dactylomela Rang, 1828
- Aplysia maculata Rang, 1828
- Variable sea hare Aplysia juliana Quoy and Gaimard, 1832
- Shaggy sea hare Bursatella leachi leachi (Blainville. 1817) (Cape Columbine to Mozambique)
- Shaggy sea hare Bursatella leachi africana (Engel, 1927)
- Wedge sea hare Dolabella auricularia (Solander, 1786) (Mossel Bay to Mozambique)
- Dolabrifera dolabrifera (Rang, 1828)
- Paraplysia lowii Gilchrist, 1900
- Stylocheilus longicauda (Quoy and Gaimard 1824)

=== Sacoglossa ===
Oxynoidae

- Lobiger souverbiei Fischer, 1856
- Lophopleurella capensis (Thiele, 1912)
- Oxynoe viridis (Pease, 1861)
- Oxynoe sp.

Juliidae

- Berthelinia schlumbergeri Dautzenberg, 1895
- Julia zebra Kawaguti, 1981

Volvatellidae

- Ascobulla fischeri (Adams & Angas, 1864)
- Volvatella laguncula Sowerby, 1894

Placobranchidae

- Elysia halimedae Macnae, 1954
- Elysia marginata (Pease, 1871)
- Elysia moebii (Bergh, 1888)
- Elysia livida Baba, 1955
- Elysia rufescens (Pease, 1871)
- Elysia vatae Risbec, 1928
- Elysia virgata (Bergh, 1888)
- Plant-sucking nudibranch Elysia viridis (Montagu, 1804) (Namaqualand to northern KwaZulu-Natal)
- Plant-sucking nudibranch Elysia sp. This may be the same species as listed above as E. viridis. There may be question of identification.
- Elysia spp. (7)

Limapontiidae

- Dendritic nudibranch Placida dendritica (Alder & Hancock, 1843)
- Stiliger ornatus Ehrenberg, 1831

Caliphyllidae

- Mourgona sp.
- Polybranchia orientalis (Kelaart, 1858) - cited as Phyllobranchillus orientalis

Hermaeidae

- Table Bay nudibranch Aplysiopsis sinusmensalis (Macnae, 1954)

=== Notaspidea ===
Umbraculidae

- Tylodina alfredensis Turton, 1932
- Umbrella pleurobranch Umbraculum sinicum (Gmelin, 1783) (transkei to Mozambique)

Pleurobranchidae

- Berthella plumula (Montagu, 1803)
- Berthella tupala Marcus, 1957
- Berthella sp.
- Lemon pleurobranch Berthellina citrina (Ruppell and Leuckart, 1828) (Cape Point to Mozambique)
- Lemon pleurobranch Berthellina granulata (Krauss, 1848) (This may replace previous entry B. citrina)
- Euselenops luniceps (Cuvier, 1817)
- Pleurobranchaea algoensis Thiele, 1925
- Pleurobranchaea brockii Bergh, 1897
- Pleurobranchaea melanopus Bergh, 1907
- Pleurobranchaea pleurobrancheana (Bergh, 1907)
- Dwarf warty pleurobranch Pleurobranchaea tarda Verrill, 1880
- Warty pleurobranch Pleurobranchaea bubala Marcus and Gosliner, 1984 (Cape Point to Eastern Cape)
- Pleurobranchella nicobarica Thiele, 1925
- Mosaic pleurobranch Pleurobranchus albiguttatus (Bergh, 1905)
- Pleurobranchus disceptus O'Donoghue, 1929
- Pleurobranchus inhacae Macnae, 1962
- Pleurobranchus moebii Vayssiere, 1898
- Pleurobranchus nigropunctatus (Bergh, 1907)
- Pleurobranchus papillosa (O'Donoghue, 1929)
- Pleurobranchus peroni Cuvier, 1804
- Pleurobranchus perrieri Vayssiere, 1896
- Pleurobranchus sculptata (O'Donoghue, 1929)
- Pleurobranchus xhosa Macnae, 1962

=== Nudibranchia - Nudibranchs ===
Bathydorididae

- Doridoxa benthalis Barnard, 1963

Dorididae

- Aldisa benguelae Gosliner, 1985
- Three-spot nudibranch Aldisa trimaculata Gosliner, 1985
- ?Alloiodoris inhacae O'Donoghue, 1929
- Archidoris capensis Bergh, 1907
- Archidoris scripta Bergh, 1907
- Rugby ball dorid or Spined dorid Atagema rugosa Pruvot-Fol, 1951
- Atagema gibba Pruvot-Fol, 1951
- Warty dorid Doris verrucosa Linnaeus, 1758 Orange river to Eastern Cape
- Doris granosa (Bergh, 1907)
- Doris spp. (2)
- Doriopsis pecten (Collingwood, 1881)
- ? Ocellate dorid Gargamella sp.1
- ?Gargamella sp.2
- Velvet dorid Jorunna tomentosa (Cuvier, 1804)
- Dotted nudibranch Jorunna zania (Transkei to northern KwaZulu-Natal)Marcus 1976

The following four species are listed as incertae sedis by Gosliner:

- Doris natalensis Krauss, 1848
- Doris pseudida Bergh, 1907
- Doris perplexa Bergh, 1907
- Doris glabella Bergh, 1907

Actinocyclidae

- Hallaxa sp.

Chromodorididae

- Saddled nudibranch Cadlina sp.1
- Brown-dotted nudibranch Cadlina sp.2
- Cadlina sp.3
- Cadlina sp.4
- Cadlinella ornatissima (Risbec, 1928)
- Ceratosoma cornigerum (Adams and Reeve, 1850)
- Inkspot nudibranch or Lipstick nudibranch Ceratosoma ingozi Gosliner, 1996
- Ceratosoma tenue Abraham, 1876
- Chromodoris africana Eliot 1904
- Chromodoris albolimbata Bergh, 1907
- Chromodoris alderi Collingwood, 1881
- Polka-dot chromodorid Chromodoris annulata Eliot 1904 (Transkei to northern KwaZulu-Natal)
- Chromodoris boucheti Rudman, 1982
- Chromodoris conchyliata Yonow, 1984
- Chromodoris euelpis Bergh, 1907
- Chromodoris fidelis Kelaart, 1858
- Chromodoris geminus Rudman, 1987
- Chromodoris cf. geminus
- Chromodoris geometrica Risbec, 1928
- Chromodoris hamiltoni Rudman, 1977
- Red-spotted nudibranch or Heather's nudibranch Chromodoris heatherae Gosliner, 1994
- Chromodoris inopinata Bergh, 1905
- Chromodoris marginata Pease, 1860
- Chromodoris porcata Bergh, 1888
- Chromodoris tinctoria (Ruppell and Leuckart, 1828)
- Gaudy chromodorid Chromodoris vicina Eliot, 1904 (Central to northern KwaZulu-Natal)
- Chromodoris spp. (7)
- Durvilledoris lemniscata (Quoy and Gaimard, 1832)
- Glossodoris atromarginata (Cuvier 1804)
- Glossodoris cincta (Bergh, 1888)
- Glossodoris pallida (Ruppell and Leuckart, 1830)
- Glossodoris symmetricus Rudman, 1990
- Glossodoris undaurum Rudman, 1985
- Glossodoris spp. (4)
- Hypselodoris bullockii (Collingwood, 1881)
- Cape dorid Hypselodoris capensis (Barnard, 1927) (Cape Columbine to Transkei)
- Hypselodoris carnea (Bergh, 1889)
- Hypselodoris fucata Gosliner & Johnson, 1999
- Mottled dorid Hypselodoris infucata (Ruppell and Leuckart, 1828) (Central KwaZulu-Natal to Mozambique)
- Hypselodoris maculosa (Pease, 1871)
- Hypselodoris maridadilus Rudman, 1977
- Hypselodoris rudmani Gosliner and Johnson, 1999
- Hypselodoris spp. (3)
- Hypselodoris sp.
- Noumea varians (Pease, 1871)
- Noumea purpurea Baba, 1949
- Protea nudibranch Noumea protea Gosliner, 1994
- Risbecia pulchella (Ruppell and Leuckart, 1828)
- Thorunna horologia Rudman, 1984

Discodorididae

- Discodoris coerulescens Bergh, 1888
- Discodoris fragilis (Alder and Hancock, 1864)
- Small-spot dorid Discodoris sp.1
- Discodoris sp.2
- Blotchy dorid Geitodoris capensis Bergh, 1907
- Anisodoris sp. (2)
- Thordisa burnupi Eliot, 1910
- Thordisa punctifera Bergh, 1907
- Thordisa spp. (2)
- ? Variable dorid Aphelodoris brunnea Bergh, 1907(needs confirmation in Discodorididae)
- ? Chocolate-chip nudibranch Aphelodoris sp. 1
- ? Brown-spotted nudibranch Aphelodoris sp. 2
- ? Spiky nudibranch Aphelodoris sp.3
- ?Sclerodoris apiculata (Alder and Hancock, 1864)(needs confirmation in Discodorididae)
- ?Sclerodoris coriacea (Eliot, 1904)(see above)
- ?Sclerodoris sp.(see above)
- ?Artachaea sp,(see above)
- Halgerda carlsoni Rudman, 1928
- Halgerda dichromis Fahey and Gosliner, 1999
- Halgerda tessellata Bergh, 1880
- Halgerda toliara Fahey and Gosliner, 1999
- Halgerda wasinensis Eliot, 1904
- Halgerda formosa Bergh, 1880
- Halgerda punctata Farran, 1902
- Rostanga muscula (Abraham, 1877)
- Red sponge nudibranch or Orange dorid Rostanga elandsia Garovoy, Valdes & Gosliner, 2001
- Rostanga phepha Garovoy, Valdés & Gosliner, 2001

Phyllidiidae

- Ceratophyllidia africana Eliot, 1903
- Phyllidia ocellata Cuvier, 1804
- Ridged nudibranch Phyllidia varicosa Lamarck, 1801 (Central KwaZulu_Natal to Mozambique)(P. coelestis? (Bergh 1905))
- Phyllidiella zeylanica (Kelaart, 1859)
- Phyllidia sp.

Dendrodorididae

- Blue-speckled nudibranch Dendrodoris caesia (Bergh, 1907)
- Dendrodoris callosa (Bergh, 1907)
- Tan dorid Dendrodoris capensis (Bergh, 1907)
- Dendrodoris denisoni (Angas, 1864)
- Dendrodoris nigra (Stimpson, 1855)
- Dendrodoris rubra (Kelaart, 1858)
- Dendrodoris spp. (3)
- Scribbled nudibranch Doriopsilla miniata (Alder and Hancock, 1864)
- White-spotted nudibranch Doriopsilla capensis Bergh, 1907
- Doriopsilla spp. (2)

Mandeliidae

- Mandela's nudibranch Mandelia mirocornata Valdes & Gosliner, 1999

Onchidorididae

- Fluffy nudibranch Acanthodoris planca
- Diaphodoris sp.

Corambidae

- Crazed nudibranch Corambe sp.

Goniodorididae

- Giraffe spot nudibranch Ancula sp.
- Tugboat nudibranch Goniodoris mercurialis Macnae, 1958
- Goniodoris castanea Alder and Hancock, 1845
- Goniodoris ovata Barnard, 1934
- Goniodoris sp.
- Fiery nudibranch Okenia amoenula (Bergh, 1907)
- Okenia sp.
- White lined nudibranch Trapania sp.1
- Trapania sp.(2)

Polyceridae

- Crimora sp.
- Kalinga ornata Alder and Hancock, 1864
- Tasseled nudibranch Kaloplocamus ramosus (Cantraine, 1835)
- Orange-clubbed nudibranch Limacia clavigera (Muller, 1776) (Cape Columbine to Eastern Cape)
- Nembrotha livingstonei Allan, 1933
- Nembrotha purpureolineata O'Donoghue, 1924
- Plocamopherus apheles (Barnard, 1927)
- Plocamopherus maculatus (Pease, 1860)
- Plocamopherus sp.
- Crowned nudibranch Polycera capensis Quoy and Gaimard, 1824 (Orange river to Eastern Cape)
- Polycera hedgpethi Marcus, 1964
- Four lined nudibranch Polycera quadrilineata (Muller, 1776)
- Polycera sp. (not same as Twin crowned or Orange lined crowned)
- Twin-crowned nudibranch Polycera sp.1
- Orange lined crowned nudibranch Polycera sp.2
- Roboastra gracilis (Bergh, 1877)
- Roboastra luteolineata (Baba, 1936)
- Black nudibranch Tambja capensis (Bergh, 1907) (Cape Point to Tsitsikamma)
- Tambja morosa (Bergh, 1877)
- Tambja sp.
- Thecacera pacifica (Bergh, 1883)
- Thecacera pennigera (Montagu, 1804)
- Thecacera sp.

Aegiridae

- Knobbly nudibranch Aegires ninguis Fahey & Gosliner, 2004

Gymnodorididae

- Gymnodoris alba (Bergh, 1877)
- Gymnodoris ceylonica (Kelaart, 1858)
- Gymnodoris inornata (Bergh, 1880)
- Gymnodoris okinawae Baba, 1936
- Gymnodoris spp. (2)
- Ghost nudibranch Lecithophorus capensis Macnae, 1958
- Lecithophorus sp.

Hexabranchidae

- Spanish dancer Hexabranchus sanguineus (Ruppell and Leuckart, 1828) (KwaZulu-Natal south coast to Mozambique)

Okadaiidae

- Okadaia elegans Baba 1931

Charcotiidae

- Frilled nudibranch or Smits nudibranch Leminda millecra Griffiths, 1985

Dotidae

- Crowned doto Doto africoronata Shipman & Gosliner, 2015
- Feathered doto Doto pinnatifida (Montagu, 1804)
- Doto rosea Trinchese, 1881

Embletoniidae

- Embletonia gracilis Risbec, 1928

Proctonotidae

- Gas flame nudibranch Bonisa nakaza Gosliner, 1981 (Cape Peninsula to Eastern Cape)
- Cape silvertip nudibranch or Silvertip nudibranch Janolus capensis Bergh, 1907 (Cape Columbine to Eastern Cape)
- Medallion silvertip nudibranch Janolus longidentatus Gosliner, 1981
- Nippled nudibranch Janolus sp.

Arminidae

- Armina berghi Thiele, 1925
- Armina capensis (Bergh, 1907)
- Armina euchroa (Bergh, 1907)
- Gilchrists sand slug Armina gilchristi (Bergh, 1907)
- Armina grisea O'Donoghue, 1927
- Armina microdonta (Bergh, 1907)
- Armina natalensis (Bergh, 1866)
- Armina serrata O'Donoghue, 1929
- Armina simoniana Thiele, 1925
- Striped sand slug or Pierre's armina Armina sp.
- White-ridged nudibranch Dermatobranchus sp. 1 (Gosliner)
- Dermatobranchus sp. 2
- Dermatobranchus sp. 3
- Brown ridged nudibranch or narrow ridged nudibranch Dermatobranchus sp. 4 (Gosliner)

Tritoniidae

- Whip fan nudibranch Tritonia nilsodhneri Marcus, 1983
- Tritonia aurantiacum Barnard, 1927
- Tritonia pallida Stimpson, 1854
- Tritonia indecora Bergh, 1907
- Soft coral nudibranch Tritonia sp. 1 (Gosliner)
- Brush nudibranch Tritonia sp. 2 (Gosliner)
- Tritoniadoxa capensis Bergh, 1907
- ?Marionia spp. (2) (is Marionia valid and in Tritoniidae?)
- Marionia cyanobranchiata (Ruppell and Leuckart, 1831) (species inquirenda)

Aranucidae

- Marianina rosea Pruvot-Fol, 1930

Bornellidae

- Bornella adamsii Gray, 1850
- Bornella anguilla Johnson, 1983

Dendronotidae

Scyllaeidae

- Iridescent nudibranch Notobryon wardi Ohdner, 1936 (Namaqualand to Tsitsikamma)
- Scyllaea pelagica Linnaeus, 1758

Tethydidae

- Dinosaur nudibranch Melibe liltvedi Gosliner, 1987
- Cowled nudibranch Melibe rosea Rang, 1829 (Orange river to Eastern Cape)
- Melibe pilosa Pease, 1860
- Melibe sp.

Flabellinidae

- Purple lady Flabellina funeka Gosliner and Griffiths, 1981
- White-edged nudibranch or Chalk stripe nudibranch Flabellina capensis (Thiele, 1025)
- Flabellina spp. (3)
- Coryphellina sp.

Fionidae

- Fiona pinnata (Eschscholtz, 1831)

Eubranchidae

- Eubranchus sp.1
- Eubranchus sp.2
- Eubranchus sp.3
- Fireworks nudibranch Eubranchus sp.4
- Candelabra nudibranch Eubranchus sp.5 (Zsilavecz)

Tergipedidae

- Candy nudibranch Cuthona speciosa (Macnae, 1954)
- Cuthona ornata Baba, 1937
- Cuthona kanga (Edmunds, 1970)
- Cuthona anulata (Baba, 1949)
- Cuthona spp. (5)
- Yellow candy nudibranch Cuthona sp.6
- Cuthona sp.
- Tergipes tergipes Forskal, 1779
- Catriona casha Gosliner and Griffiths, 1981
- Catriona columbiana O'Donoghue, 1922
- Catriona sp.
- Phestilla melanobrachia Bergh, 1874

Aeolidiidae

- Indian nudibranch Aeolidiella indica Bergh, 1888 (Cape Columbine to central KwaZulu-Natal)
- Aeolidiella alba Risbec, 1928
- Berghia chaka Gosliner, 1985
- Baeolidia palythoae Gosliner, 1985

Facelinidae

- Night sky nudibranch Amanda armata Macnae, 1954
- Caloria indica (Bergh, 1896)
- Black-dot nudibranch Caloria sp. 1
- Yellow-tipped nudibranch Caloria sp. 2
- Caloria sp. 3
- Orange eyed nudibranch or White tipped nudibranch Cratena capensis Barnard, 1927 (Cape Columbine to Eastern Cape)
- Cratena simba Edmunds, 1970
- Elegant nudibranch Cratena sp.1
- Cratena spp. (+3)
- Echinopsole fulvus Macnae, 1954
- Olive nudibranch Facelina olivacea Macnae, 1954
- Facellina annulata Macnae, 1954
- Facellina sp.
- Favorinus japonicus Baba, 1949
- Favorinus ghanensis Edmunds, 1968
- Moridilla brockii (Bergh, 1888)
- Coral nudibranch Phyllodesmium serratum (Baba, 1949) (Cape Point to northern KwaZulu-Natal)
- Coral nudibranch Phyllodesmium horridum (Macnae, 1954) (this may replace previous entry P. serratum)
- Phyllodesmium hyalinum Ehrenberg, 1831
- Phyllodesmium sp.
- Pruvotfolia pselliotes (Labbe, 1923)
- Pteraeolidia ianthina (Angas, 1864)

Glaucidae

- Four-colour nudibranch Godiva quadricolor (Barnard, 1927) (Cape Point to Eastern Cape)
- Sea swallow Glaucus atlanticus Forster, 1777 (Cape Point to northern KwaZulu-Natal)

Family?

- Platydoris scabra (Cuvier 1806)
- Platydoris cruenta (Quoy and Gaimard 1932)
- Platydoris sp.

Cavoliniidae

- Wing footed opisthobranchs Cavolinia spp.

=== Pulmonata ===
Onchidiidae

- Airbreathing sea slug Onchidella capensis (Orange river to Cape Point)
- Peronia peronii (Cuvier, 1804) (Northern KwaZulu-Natal)
