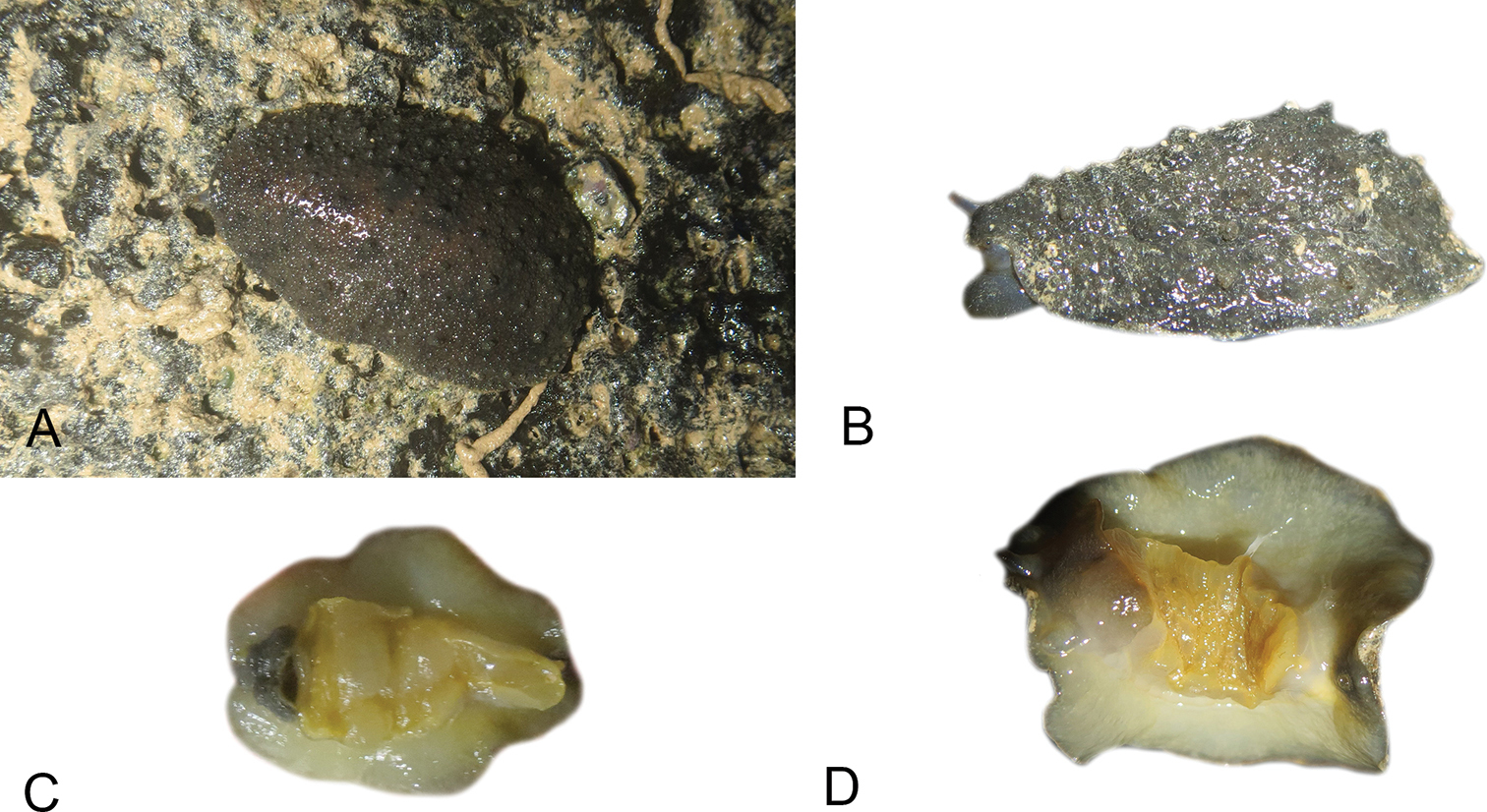

Scientific classification
- Kingdom: Animalia
- Phylum: Mollusca
- Class: Gastropoda
- Order: Systellommatophora
- Family: Onchidiidae
- Genus: Peronia
- Species: P. platei

Binomial name
- Peronia platei (Hoffman, 1928)

Synonyms
- Onchidium platei Hoffmann, 1928 (original combination); Oncidium platei Hoffmann, 1928 ·

= Peronia platei =

Species of gastropod

Peronia platei is a species of marine gastropod mollusk in the family Onchidiidae, one of the families of sea slugs. Nine species of Peronia are recognized, which can be differentiated by both mitochondrial DNA sequencing and examining their internal anatomy.

== Classification ==
Intertidal sea slugs are gastropods belonging to the subclass Heterobranchia and the family Onchiididae. They share many characteristics of shell-less marine mollusks, including dorsal gills that are visible when relaxed and retracted when crawling during low tide.

== Distribution and habitat ==
This species has a cosmopolitan distribution across the entire tropical and subtropical Indo-West Pacific, from South Africa to Hawaii. It prefers rocky intertidal areas, such as lagoons, staying hidden in crevices during high tide, and only emerging during low tide.

== Description ==
Peronia platei has a non-flattened body and is grey in color, with small rounded protrusions on the exterior surface. Gills are located on its back under the dorsal notum. It has hermaphroditic parts in the posterior regions of the deferent duct and straight oviduct. The male part is the muscular sac of the accessory penial gland in the anterior area that is 5 mm long; the spine of the accessory penial gland is 0.9 mm long, narrow, elongated, straight, or slightly curved. The specimen has intestinal loops of type V and several dorsal papilla with eyes and rachidian and innermost lateral teeth. They breathe air using their gills and die if exposed to water for too long. The color of the dorsal notum is dark grey, including the papillae. Some of the papillae show black dorsal eyes at their tip, with the number varying from 7 to 10. Its mantle (hyponotum) is light yellow, and the foot is pale yellow to orange. The ocular tentacles are grey, like the head.

== Human use ==
This species is being used to study anatomical and systematic descriptions for future research. It is an indicator species that give clues about the health of the oceanic environment.
