= Oligophagy =

Feeding on few specific types of food

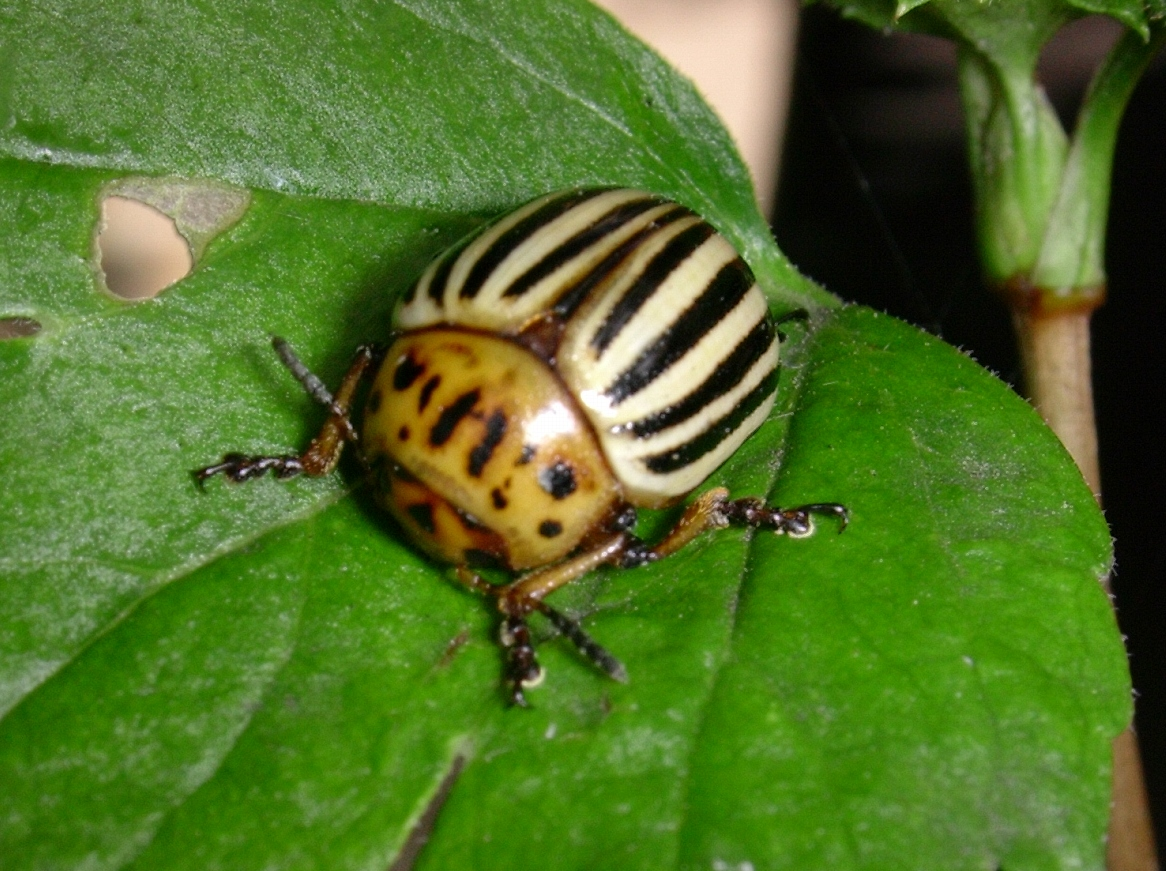
The Colorado potato beetle will typically only feed on plants of the family Solanaceae.

Oligophagy refers to the eating of only a few specific foods, and to monophagy when restricted to a single food source. The term is usually associated with insect dietary behaviour. Organisms may exhibit narrow or specific oligophagy where the diet is restricted to a very few foods or broad oligophagy where the organism feeds on a wide variety of specific foods but none others.

Polyphagy, on the contrary, refers to eating a broad spectrum of foods. In the insect world it refers usually to insects that feed on plants belonging to different families.

== Examples ==
The diet of the yucca moths is restricted to the developing fruits of species of yucca while the sea hare, Aplysia juliana (Quoy & Gaimard), is found on and feeds only on a single alga, Ulva lactuca (Linnaeus) in east Australian waters. These are both narrow oligophages. Conversely the migratory locust may be said to be broadly oligophagous or even polyphagous.
