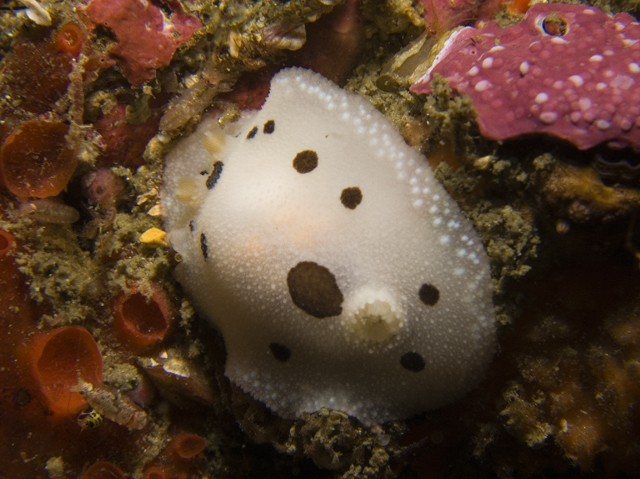

Scientific classification
- Kingdom: Animalia
- Phylum: Mollusca
- Class: Gastropoda
- Order: Nudibranchia
- Family: Dorididae
- Genus: Aphelodoris
- Species: A. sp. 2

Binomial name
- Aphelodoris sp. 2

= Brown-spotted nudibranch =

Brown-spotted nudibranch Aphelodoris sp. 2

Species of gastropod

The brown-spotted nudibranch, currently known simply as Aphelodoris sp. 2, is an undescribed species of dorid nudibranch as designated by Zsilavecz, 2007. As of November 2009, it remains undescribed by science. It is a marine gastropod mollusc in the family Dorididae.

== Distribution ==
This species has so far only been found around the southern African coast on the Atlantic side of the Cape Peninsula in 10–35 m of water.

== Description ==
The brown-spotted nudibranch is a white-bodied dorid with a bumpy skin and a few brown blotches of varying sizes on its notum. Its margin has opaque white dots. It has eight gills arranged around the anus and its rhinophores are perfoliate. It can grow to reach a total length of 40 mm.
