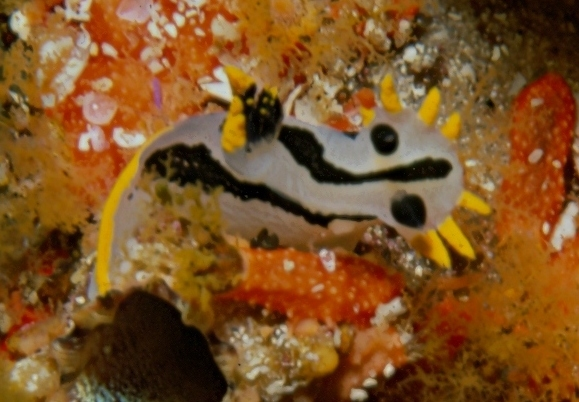

Scientific classification
- Kingdom: Animalia
- Phylum: Mollusca
- Class: Gastropoda
- Order: Nudibranchia
- Family: Polyceridae
- Genus: Polycera
- Species: P. capensis

Binomial name
- Polycera capensis Quoy & Gaimard, 1824

= Crowned nudibranch =

Species of gastropod

The crowned nudibranch (Polycera capensis) is a species of dorid nudibranch. It is a marine gastropod mollusc in the family Polyceridae.

== Distribution ==
Polycera capensis is native to southern Africa, where it occurs from Luderitz, Namibia, to Port Alfred, South Africa. It is found from the intertidal zone down to a depth of 35 m. It also occurs as an invasive species in eastern Australia, where it was first introduced around Sydney during the 1920s, likely as a result of vessel biofouling. Since then, P. capensis has expanded southward along the east coast of Australia, now established as far south as Tasmania.

== Description ==
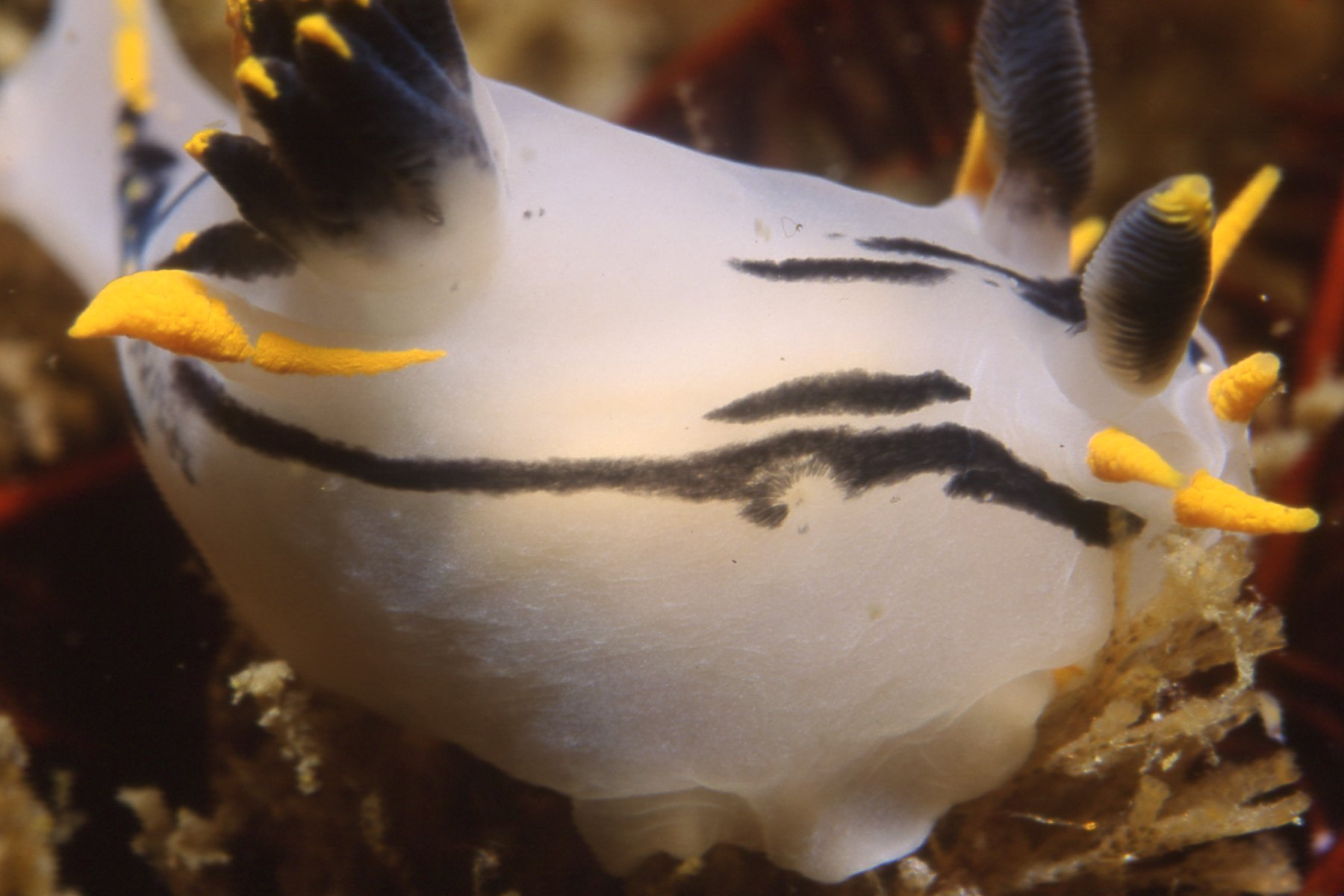
Polycera capensis

The crowned nudibranch is a smooth-bodied, variably coloured nudibranch. The ground colour is white or grey and there are usually black, yellow or orange stripes longitudinally along the notum, though these can be absent. The head has six yellow projections. The gills and rhinophores are black, and may be spotted with yellow. Alongside the gills is a pair of yellow projections. The animal may reach 50 mm in total length.

A study using DNA sequencing found that there were two species amongst specimens identified as P. capensis, one of which appears to be the Twin-crowned nudibranch of Gosliner, 1987.

== Ecology ==
The crowned nudibranch feeds on bryozoans of the genus Bugula. Its egg ribbon is a wavy white collar.
