= Quoya =

Quoya may refer to:

- Quoya (gastropod) a genus of air-breathing sea slugs in the family Onchidiidae
- Quoya (plant), a genus of Australian plants in the family Lamiaceae
