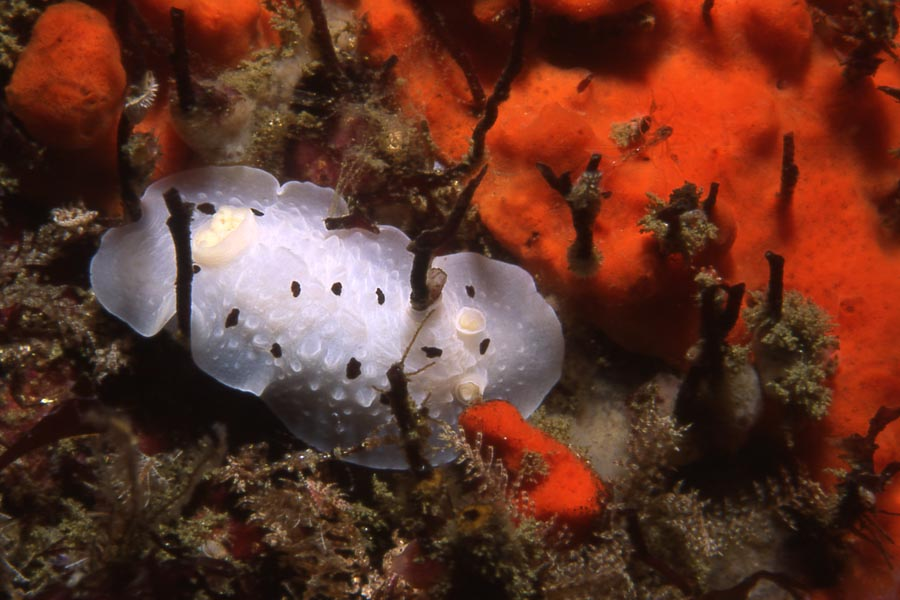

Scientific classification
- Kingdom: Animalia
- Phylum: Mollusca
- Class: Gastropoda
- Order: Nudibranchia
- Family: Dorididae
- Genus: Aphelodoris
- Species: A. sp. 3

Binomial name
- Aphelodoris sp. 3

= Spiky nudibranch =

Species of gastropod

The spiky nudibranch, Aphelodoris sp. 3, is an undescribed species of dorid nudibranch as designated by Zsilavecz, 2007. As at November 2009, it remained undescribed by science. It is a marine gastropod mollusc in the family Dorididae.

== Distribution ==
This species has so far only been found around the southern African coast on the Atlantic side of the Cape Peninsula in 10–35m of water.

== Description ==
The spiky nudibranch is a white-bodied dorid with a spiky, bumpy skin and a few brown blotches of varying sizes on its notum. It has eight gills arranged around the anus and its rhinophores are perfoliate. It may reach a total length of 40 mm.
