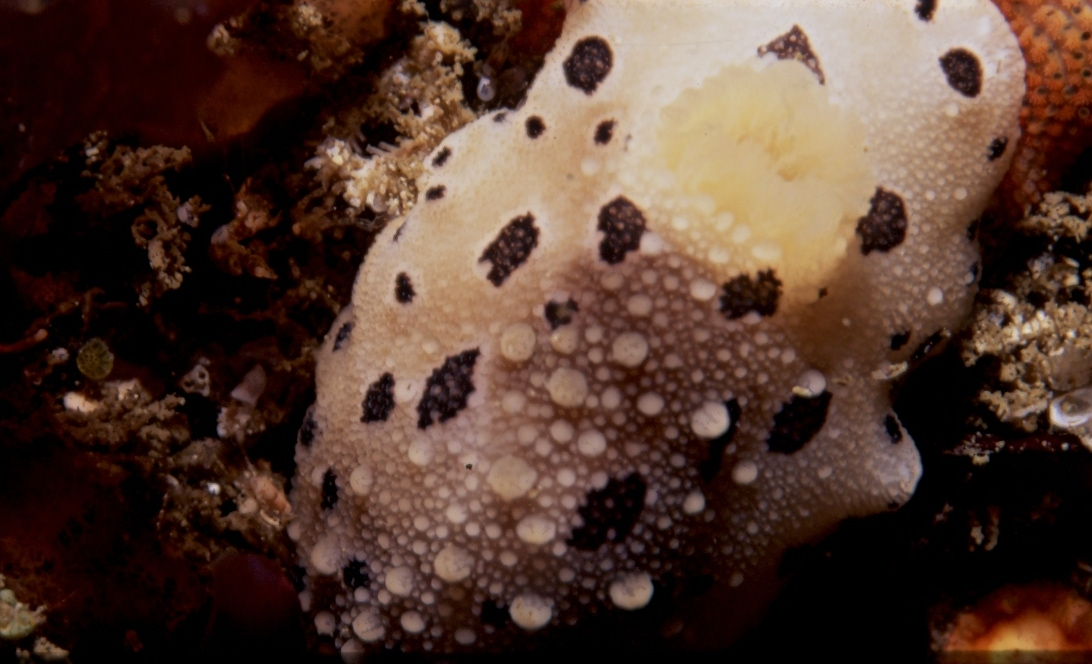
- A close-up of an individual of Mandela mirocornata showing gill rosette

Scientific classification
- Kingdom: Animalia
- Phylum: Mollusca
- Class: Gastropoda
- Order: Nudibranchia
- Family: Mandeliidae
- Genus: Mandelia; Valdés & Gosliner, 1999

= Mandela's nudibranch =

Species of gastropod

Mandela's nudibranch, Mandelia mirocornata, is a species of sea slug, a dorid nudibranch. It is a marine gastropod mollusc, the only member of the genus Mandelia and the family Mandeliidae. The genus and family name honor Nelson Mandela, the former President of South Africa.

== Distribution ==
This species has so far only been found around the southern African coast from the Atlantic coast of the Cape Peninsula to Port Elizabeth in 10–400 m of water. It is probably endemic.

== Description ==
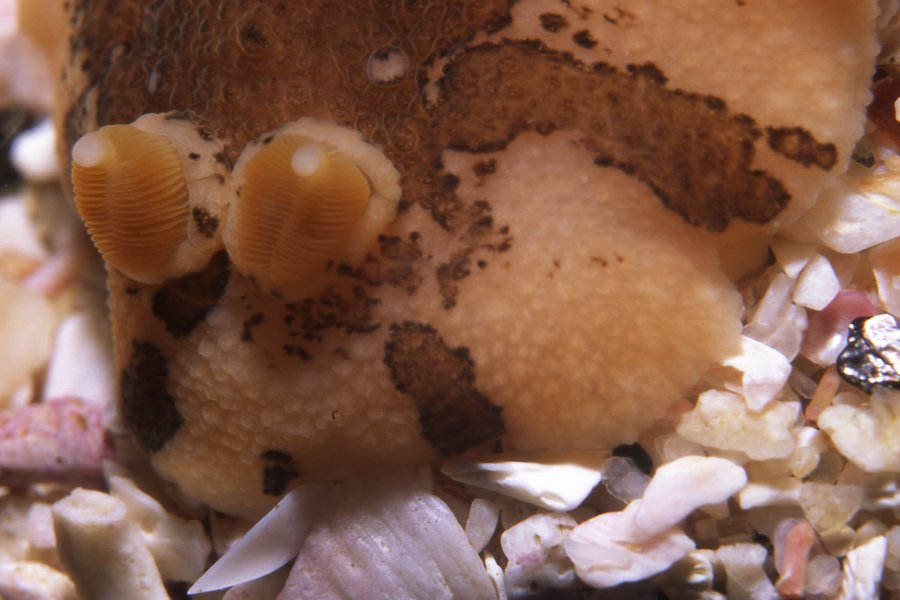
The unusual oblong rhinophores of Mandela's nudibranch

Mandela's nudibranch has a bumpy dirty white to brown skin. It has black spots scattered over the notum. Its gills and rhinophores are large and creamy-coloured. The rhinophores are perfoliate, but are oblong rather than round. The animal may also have irregular brown stripes rather than spots on the notum, radiating out to the margins. It may reach a total length of 70 mm.

== Distinguishing features ==
The body is dirty white or pale brown with irregular solid black spots and a bumpy surface texture. In water, the oblong, creamy rhinophores (chemosensory tentacles) are visible. The dorsal surface is often translucent, partially revealing internal organs. The body is white to cream with brown or black blotches, accompanied by creamy rhinophores and gills.

== Ecology ==
This species feeds on sponges.

== See also ==
- List of organisms named after famous people (born 1900–1924)
