= Paraperonia jousseaumei =

Scientific classification
- Kingdom: Animalia
- Phylum: Mollusca
- Class: Gastropoda
- Order: Systellommatophora
- Family: Onchidiidae
- Genus: Paraperonia
- Species: P. jousseaumei

Binomial name
- Paraperonia jousseaumei Labbé, 1934

Species of gastropod

Paraperonia jousseaumei is a species of air-breathing sea slug, a shell-less marine pulmonate gastropod mollusk in the family Onchidiidae.
