= Chocolate chip (disambiguation) =

A chocolate chip is a small chunk of chocolate.

Chocolate chip may also refer to:

- Chocolate Chip (album), an album by Isaac Hayes
- Chocolate-chip nudibranch, a type of mollusk
- Desert Battle Dress Uniform, a camouflage pattern colloquially called "chocolate chip"
- Iris Kyle, a bodybuilder nicknamed Chocolate Chip
- Chocolate-covered potato chips

== See also ==
- Chocolate chip cookie
- Chocolate chip cookie dough ice cream
- Chocolate chip muffin, a muffin loaded with semi-sweet chocolate chips
- Chocolate chip pancake
