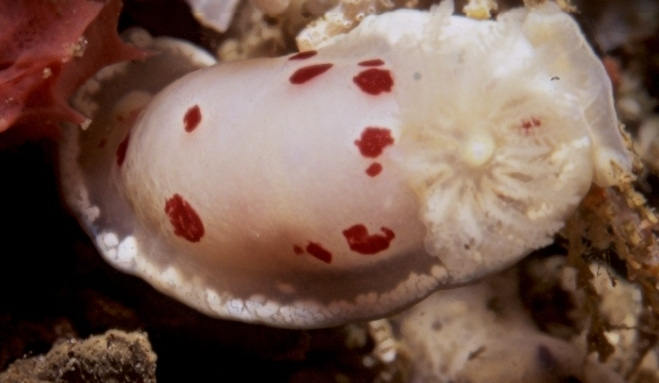

Scientific classification
- Kingdom: Animalia
- Phylum: Mollusca
- Class: Gastropoda
- Order: Nudibranchia
- Family: Chromodorididae
- Genus: Goniobranchus
- Species: G. heatherae

Binomial name
- Goniobranchus heatherae (Gosliner, 1994)

Synonyms
- Chromodoris heatherae Gosliner, 1994 basionym

= Goniobranchus heatherae =

Red-spotted nudibranch

Species of gastropod

Goniobranchus heatherae, the red-spotted nudibranch, is a species of colourful sea slug, a dorid nudibranch. It is a marine gastropod mollusc in the family Chromodorididae.

== Distribution ==
This species has so far only been found around the southern African coast from the Cape Peninsula to Port Elizabeth, subtidally to 30 m. It is probably endemic.

== Description ==
The red-spotted nudibranch is a white-bodied dorid with a smooth skin and with variably distributed red spots and an opaque white band around the notum. There may also be a yellowish line around the edge of the notum, which is more common in specimens seen towards the eastern part of the distribution. It has eight gills arranged around the anus and its rhinophores are perfoliate. It may reach a total length of 50 mm.

== Ecology ==
This species feeds on sponges.
