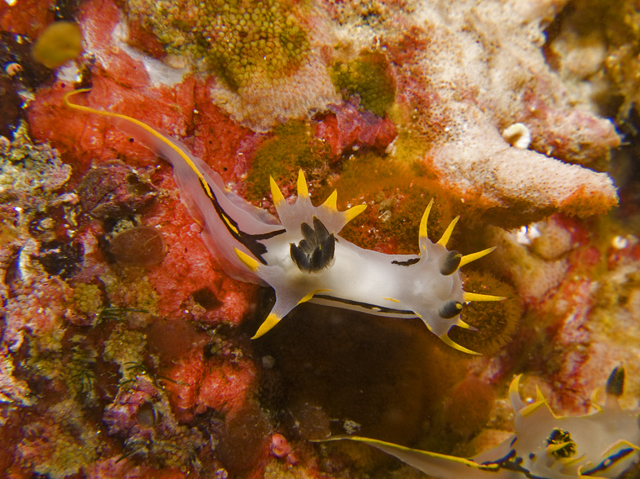
- A live individual of Polycera sp. in situ, with the edge of a second individual visible below it

Scientific classification
- Kingdom: Animalia
- Phylum: Mollusca
- Class: Gastropoda
- Order: Nudibranchia
- Family: Polyceridae
- Genus: Polycera
- Species: P. sp.

Binomial name
- Polycera sp.

= Twin-crowned nudibranch =

Species of gastropod

The twin-crowned nudibranch, scientific name Polycera sp., as designated by Gosliner, 1987, is a species of dorid nudibranch. It is a marine gastropod mollusc in the family Polyceridae. As of November 2009, it was undescribed by science.

== Distribution ==
This species has been found off the southern African coast off the Cape Peninsula in False Bay and off Durban in 2–30 m.

== Description ==
The twin-crowned nudibranch is a smooth-bodied variably coloured nudibranch. The ground colour is white or grey and there are usually black, yellow or orange stripes longitudinally along the notum, though these can be absent. The head has six yellow projections. The gills and rhinophores are black, and may be spotted with yellow. There are raised yellow spots on the mid-dorsal region. Alongside the gills are two or three pairs of yellow projections, which differentiate the animal from the crowned nudibranch and the fourline nudibranch. The animal may reach 30 mm in total length. A study using DNA sequencing found that there were two species amongst specimens identified as P. capensis and this species was categorized as Polycera sp. A.

== Ecology ==
The egg ribbon of this species is a wavy white spiral collar.
