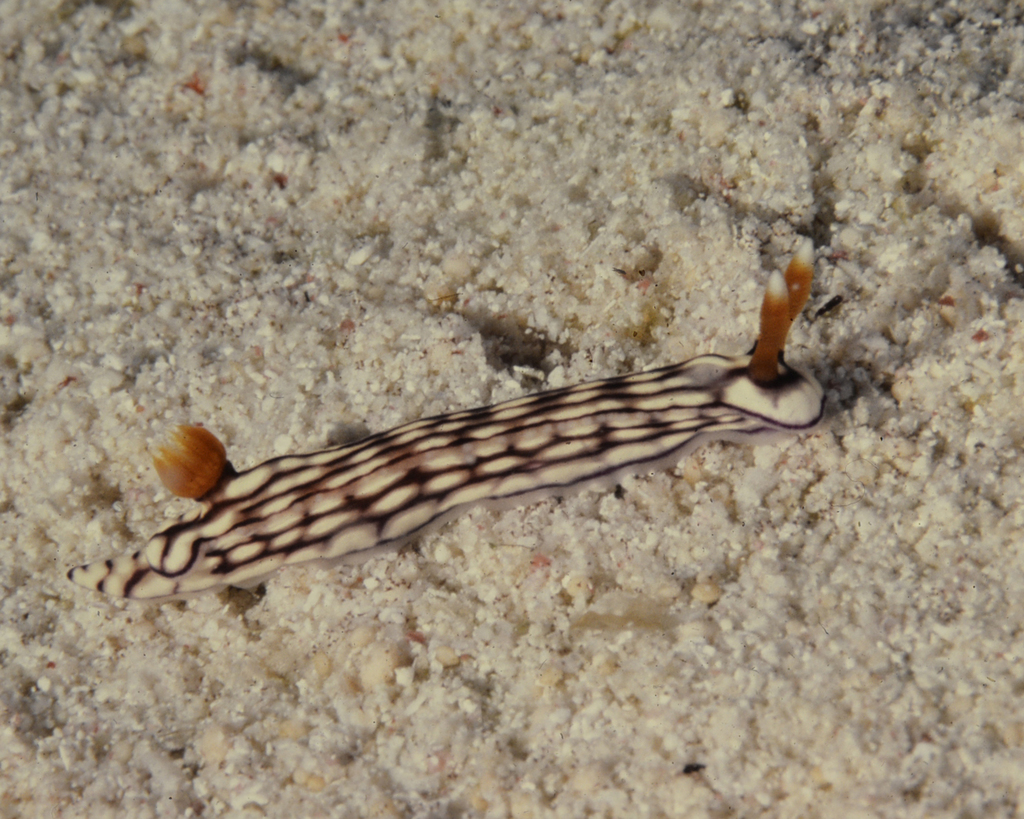

Scientific classification
- Kingdom: Animalia
- Phylum: Mollusca
- Class: Gastropoda
- Order: Nudibranchia
- Family: Chromodorididae
- Genus: Hypselodoris
- Species: H. whitei

Binomial name
- Hypselodoris whitei (Adams & Reeve, 1850)

Synonyms
- Hypselodoris mouaci

= Hypselodoris whitei =

Species of gastropod

Hypselodoris whitei is a colourful species of sea slug or dorid nudibranch, a marine gastropod mollusk in the family Chromodorididae.

== Distribution ==
This nudibranch was described from Caramata Passage between Sumatra and Borneo. It is reported from the Tropical Western Pacific from Australia to Hawaii.

== Description ==
Hypselodoris whitei has a yellow body with purple longitudinal lines, and a purple bordered mantle. The gills and rhinophores are bright orange tipped with white. It is very similar in appearance to Hypselodoris maridadilus but that species lacks the white-tipped rhinophores and gills. This species can reach a total length of at least 40 mm and feeds on sponges.
