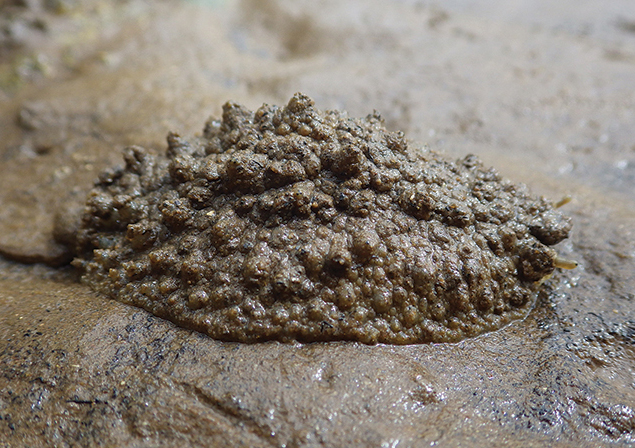

Scientific classification
- Kingdom: Animalia
- Phylum: Mollusca
- Class: Gastropoda
- Order: Systellommatophora
- Family: Onchidiidae
- Genus: Peronia
- Species: P. verruculata

Binomial name
- Peronia verruculata (Cuvier, 1830)

Synonyms
- Onchidium verruculatum Cuvier, 1830; Oncidium elberti Simroth, 1918; Peronia alderi J.E. Gray, 1850; Peronia savignyi Recluz, 1869

= Peronia verruculata =

Species of gastropod

Peronia verruculata is a species of air-breathing sea slug, a shell-less marine pulmonate gastropod mollusk in the family Onchidiidae.

== Distribution ==
This species is distributed in the Indian Ocean along Madagascar.

== Human Use ==
In the Philippines, Peronia verruculata, is considered a delicacy in certain coastal communities. The slug is typically harvested from intertidal areas and consumed raw with simple sauces made from kalamansi with soy sauce.
