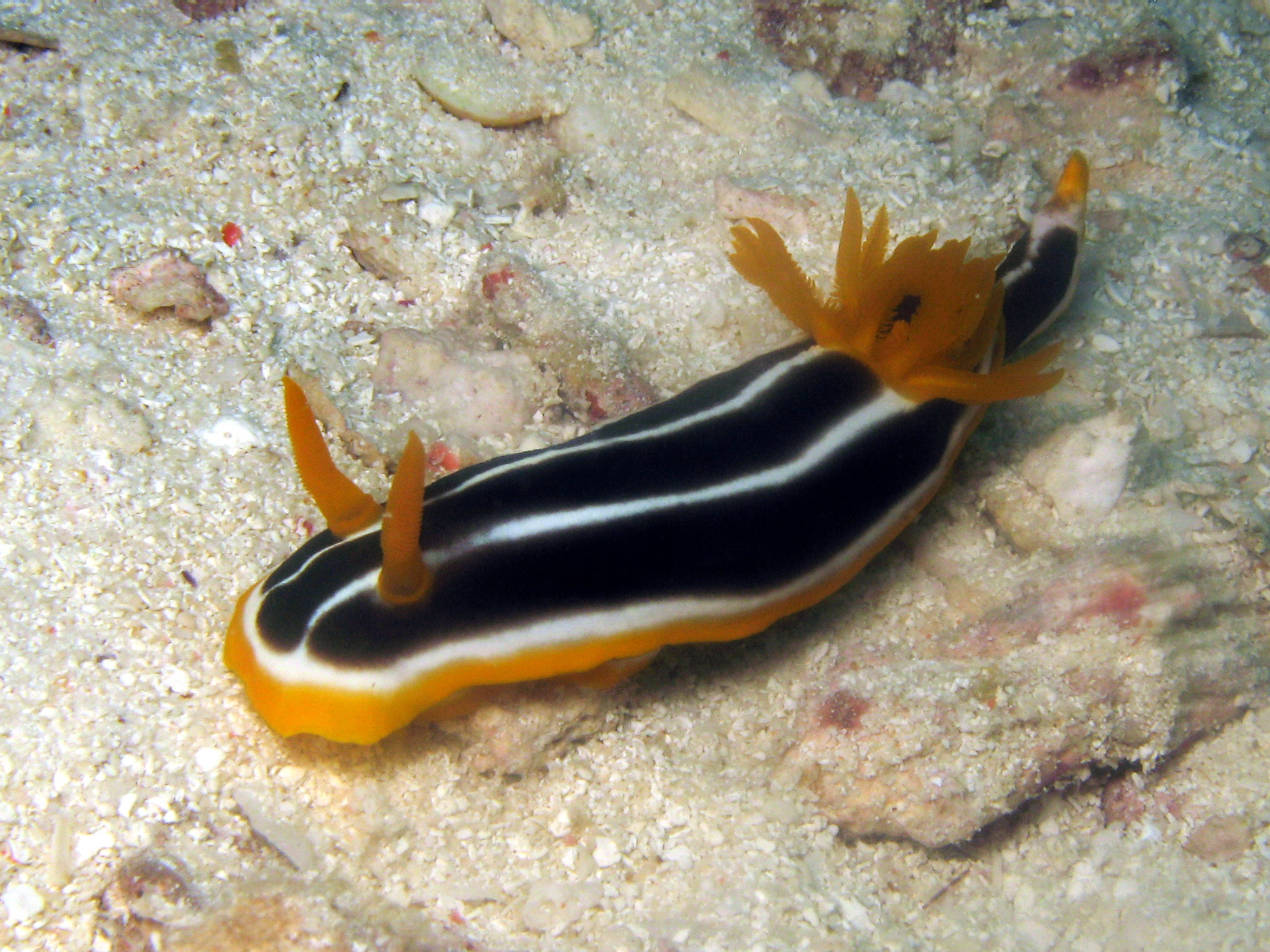
- Chromodoris africana

Scientific classification
- Kingdom: Animalia
- Phylum: Mollusca
- Class: Gastropoda
- Order: Nudibranchia
- Family: Chromodorididae
- Genus: Chromodoris
- Species: C. africana

Binomial name
- Chromodoris africana Eliot, 1904

= Chromodoris africana =

Species of gastropod

Chromodoris africana, or four-coloured nudibranch, is a species of colourful sea slug, a dorid nudibranch, a marine gastropod mollusc in the family Chromodorididae.

== Distribution ==
This species is known from the Red Sea and the western Indian Ocean to the southern KwaZulu-Natal coast of South Africa. It is found down to depths of 30m.

== Description ==
This species may grow to 75mm in total length. It is a smooth-bodied nudibranch, with a black ground colour, two white lines running down the notum, which has a white rim, and an orange margin. The gills and rhinophores are yellow to orange.

== Ecology ==
C. africana feeds on sponges. It is known to eat a species of the sponge genus Negombata.
