= Peronia anomala =

Scientific classification
- Kingdom: Animalia
- Phylum: Mollusca
- Class: Gastropoda
- Order: Systellommatophora
- Family: Onchidiidae
- Genus: Peronia
- Species: P. anomala

Binomial name
- Peronia anomala Labbé, 1934

Species of gastropod

Peronia anomala is a species of air-breathing sea slug, a shell-less marine pulmonate gastropod mollusk in the family Onchidiidae. It is the most recently discovered species of the genus of Peronia, found in the Red Sea in 1934.

== Description ==
The sea-slug has a small pleural tooth 54μ wide, described by Labbé as "a bit like P. verruclata". Their size ranged from 10 to 5 mm in length and they have a very contacted body, almost globular. They also have thin integuments and a slightly pigmented pleural cavity.

== Distribution ==
P. anomala lives in a marine biome sea habitat.
