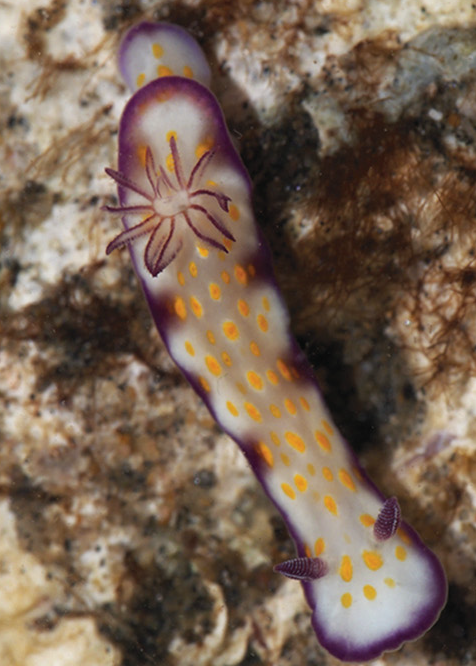

Scientific classification
- Kingdom: Animalia
- Phylum: Mollusca
- Class: Gastropoda
- Order: Nudibranchia
- Family: Chromodorididae
- Genus: Hypselodoris
- Species: H. ghardaqana

Binomial name
- Hypselodoris ghardaqana (Gohar & Aboul-Ela, 1957)

Synonyms
- Chromodoris ghardaqana Gohar & Aboul-Ela, 1957 (basionym); Risbecia ghardaqana (Gohar & Aboul-Ela, 1957)

= Hypselodoris ghardaqana =

Species of gastropod

Hypselodoris ghardaqana is a species of sea slug, a dorid nudibranch, a marine gastropod mollusk in the family Chromodorididae.

== Distribution ==
This species was described from the Red Sea. It has been reported from the Indian Ocean.

== Description ==
This species is similar in colouration to Hypselodoris pulchella. It is suggested that this is a case of mimicry because the two species are not closely related.
