= Tergum =

Dorsal sclerite of arthropod

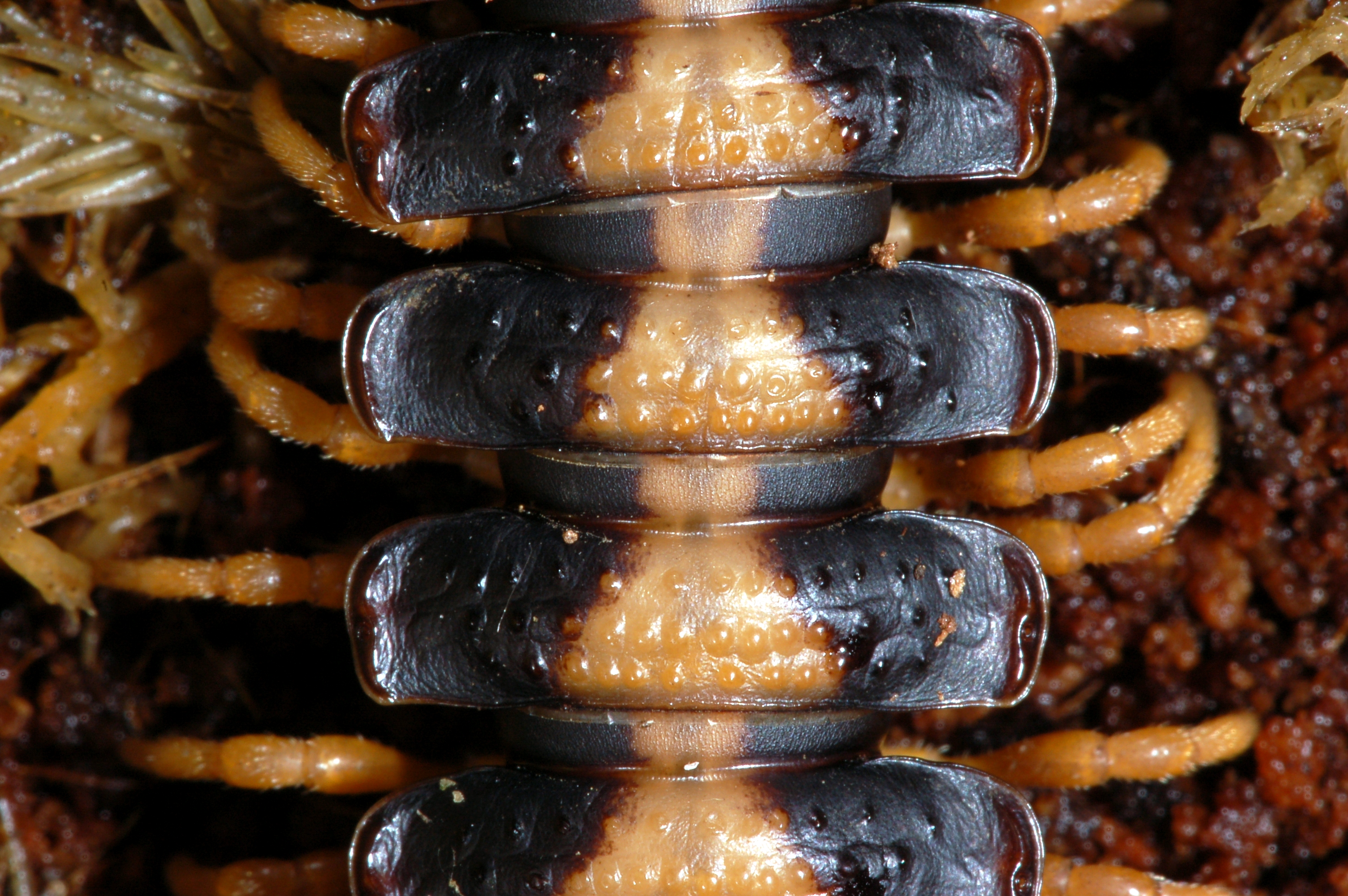
Tergites (with lateral paranota) of a polydesmidan millipede

A tergum (Latin for "the back"; pl.: terga, associated adjective tergal) is the dorsal ('upper') portion of an arthropod segment other than the head. The anterior edge is called the 'base' and posterior edge is called the 'apex' or 'margin'. A given tergum may be divided into hardened plates or sclerites commonly referred to as tergites.

In a thoracic segment, for example, the tergum may be divided into an anterior notum and a posterior scutellum. Lateral extensions of a tergite are known as paranota (Greek for "alongside the back") or carinae (Latin for "keel"), exemplified by the flat-backed millipedes of the order Polydesmida.

Kinorhynchs have tergal and sternal plates too, though seemingly not homologous with those of arthropods.

Tergo-tergal is a stridulatory mechanism in which fine spines of the abdominal tergites are rubbed together to produce sound. This process is known as abdominal telescoping.

== Examples ==
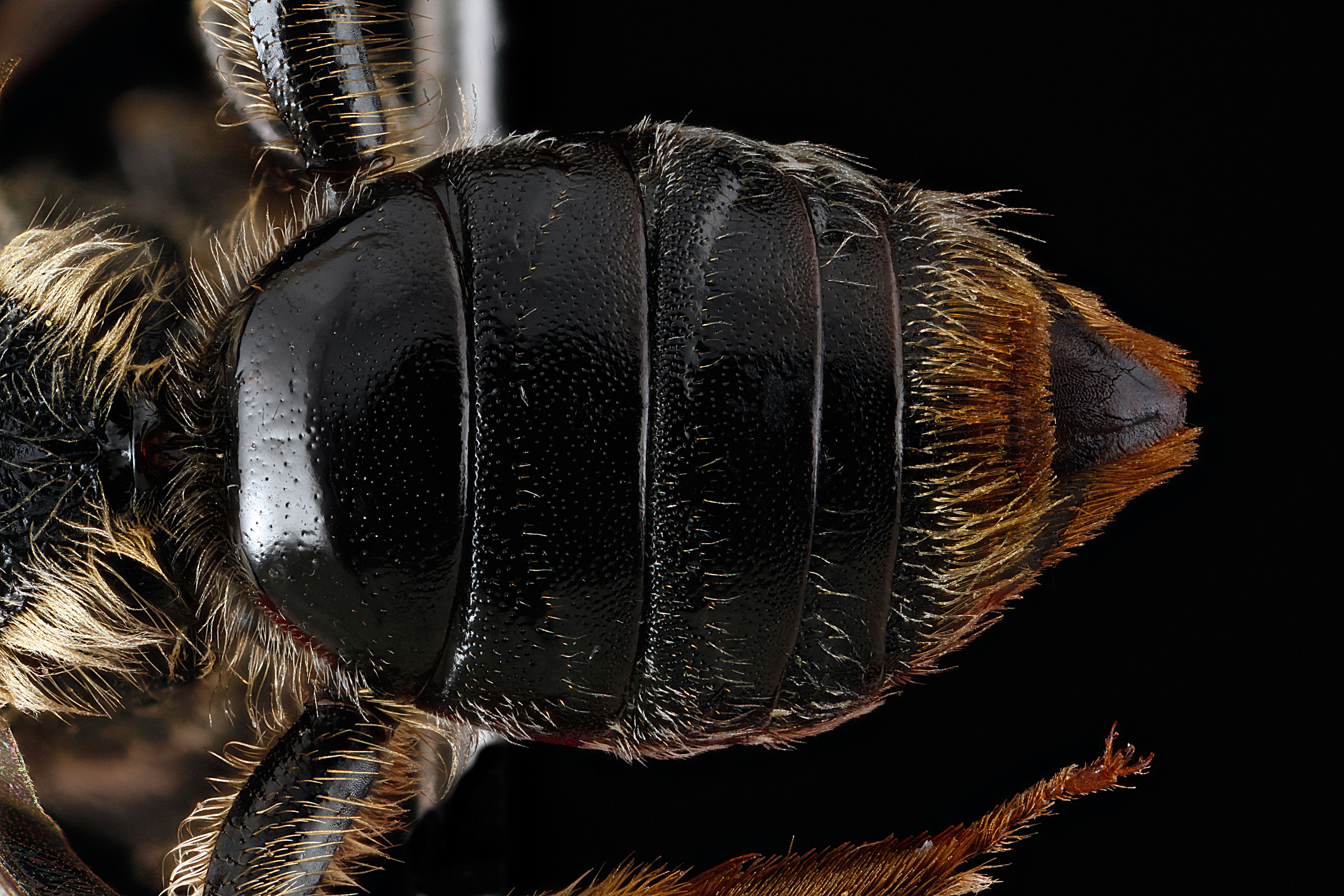
Abdominal tergum (divided into several tergites) of a bee.

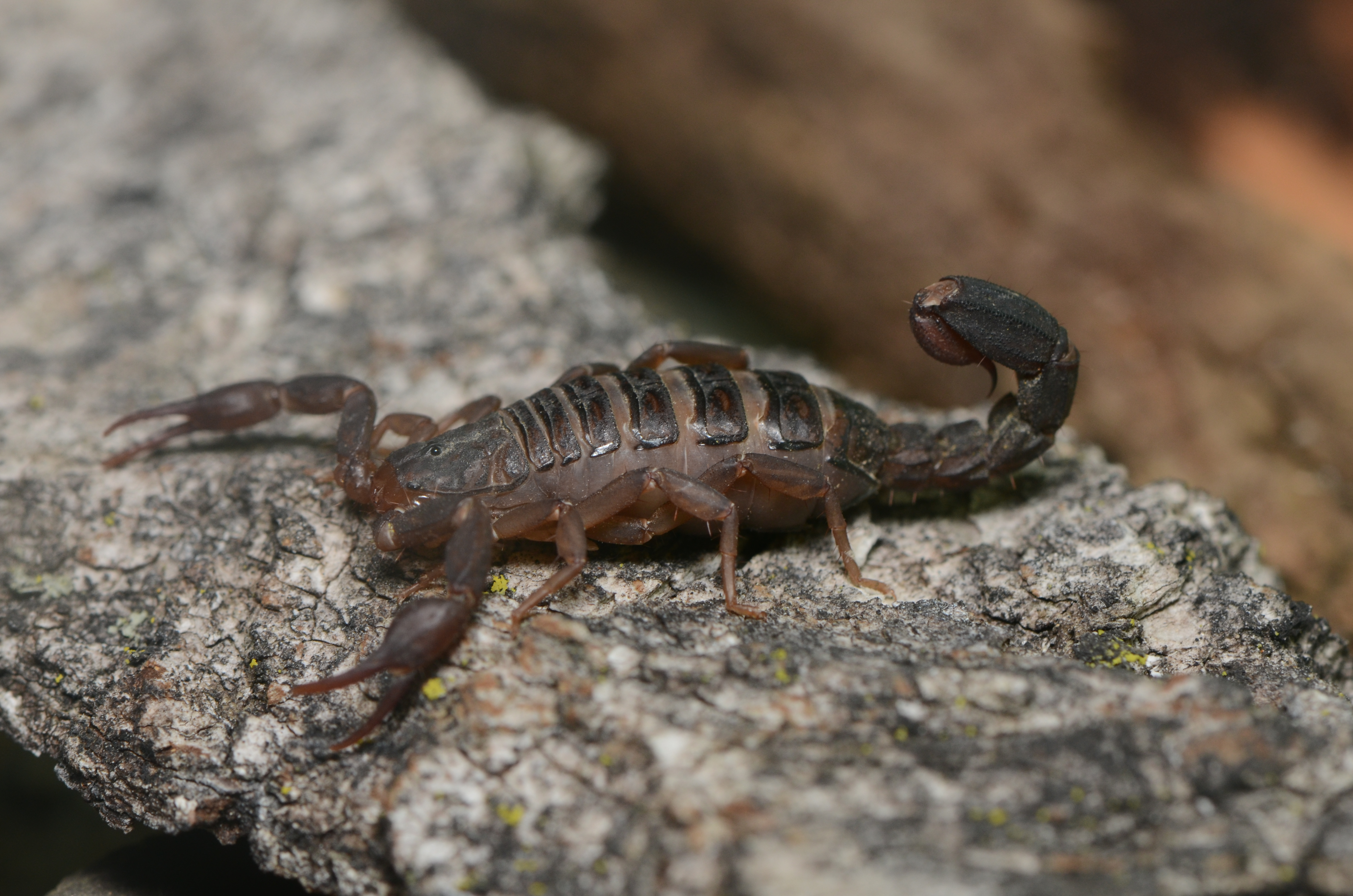
Seven sclerites distinctly visible on the back of a pregnant scorpion.

A tergite of this wasp is labeled 19.

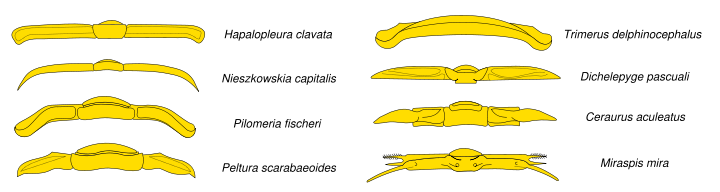
Thoracic tergites of various trilobites.

== See also ==
- Sternum (arthropod anatomy)
