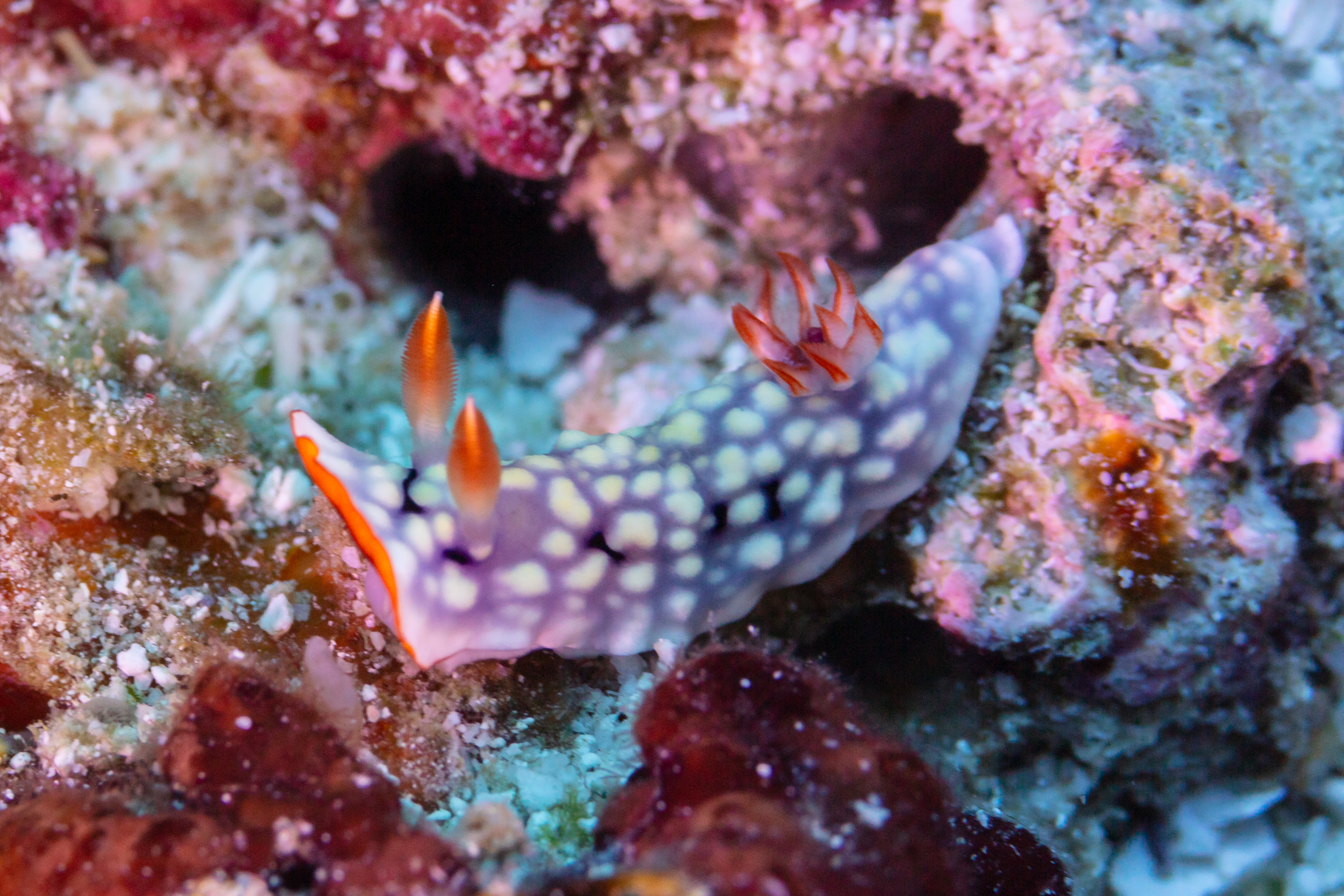
- Goniobranchus conchyliatus, La Réunion

Scientific classification
- Kingdom: Animalia
- Phylum: Mollusca
- Class: Gastropoda
- Order: Nudibranchia
- Family: Chromodorididae
- Genus: Goniobranchus
- Species: G. conchyliatus

Binomial name
- Goniobranchus conchyliatus (Yonow, 1984)

Synonyms
- Chromodoris conchyliata Yonow, 1984 (basionym)

= Goniobranchus conchyliatus =

Species of gastropod

Goniobranchus conchyliatus is a species of colourful sea slug, a dorid nudibranch, a marine gastropod mollusc in the family Chromodorididae.

== Distribution ==
This species was described from Sri Lanka. It is widespread in the Indian Ocean and is similar in colouration to Goniobranchus geometricus from the West Pacific Ocean. Both species have been reported from South Africa.
