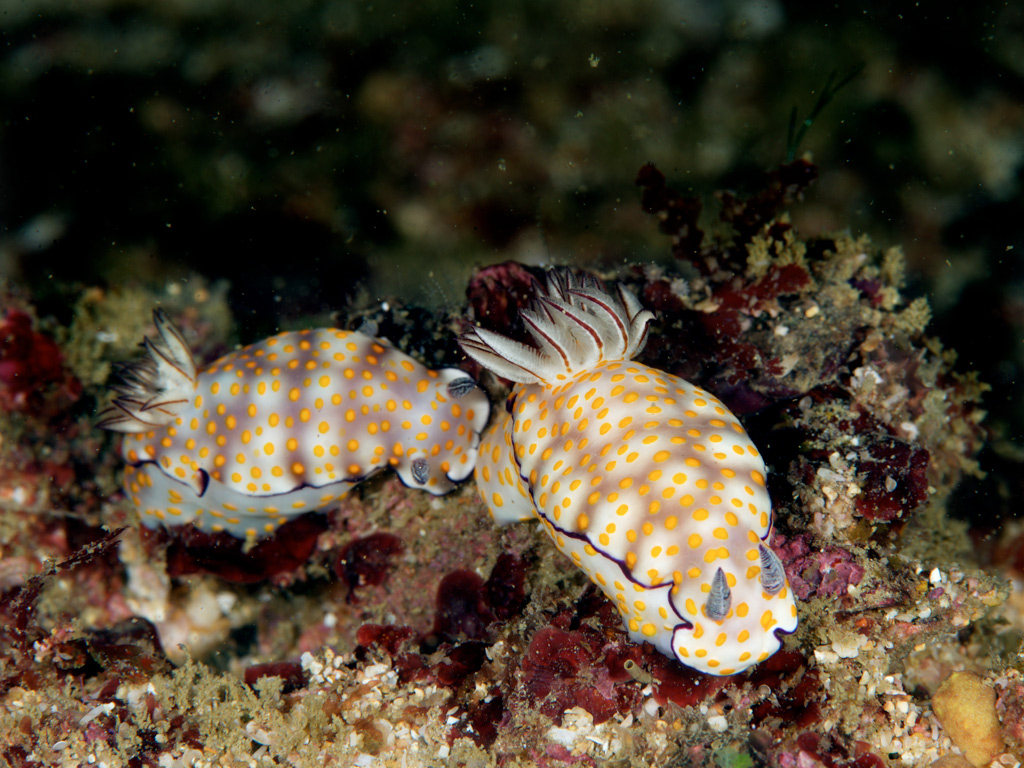
- The nudibranch, Hypselodoris pulchella, Mirissa, Sri Lanka.

Scientific classification
- Kingdom: Animalia
- Phylum: Mollusca
- Class: Gastropoda
- Order: Nudibranchia
- Family: Chromodorididae
- Genus: Hypselodoris
- Species: H. pulchella

Binomial name
- Hypselodoris pulchella (Ruppell & Leuckart, 1828)

Synonyms
- Chromodoris pulchella (Ruppell & Leuckart, 1828); Doris pulchella Ruppell & Leuckart, 1828 (Basionym); Risbecia pulchella (Rüppell & Leuckart, 1828)

= Hypselodoris pulchella =

Species of gastropod

Hypselodoris pulchella is a species of sea slug, a dorid nudibranch, a marine gastropod mollusk in the family Chromodorididae.

== Description ==
Hypselodoris pulchella is a long slender species with a body size up to 80 mm or even 110 mm. The mantle edges are well extended along the body, with a thin bluish border. The mantle and the foot are creamy white, covered with numerous small rounded yellowish-orange spots of different sizes. There is always a diffuse pattern of pale violet-brown on the back; this is absent in the similar species Hypselodoris ghardaqana. The sensory tentacles (the antennae like rhinophores) are bluish. The main respiratory organs (gills) vary from bluish to orange. These sea slugs usually raise and lower rhythmically their head, vibrating their gills. They often show a characteristic 'trailing' behaviour, with two individuals following closely each other. This species feeds on sponges.

== Distribution ==
This species was described from the Red Sea. Hypselodoris pulchella is found in the Red Sea and the Indian Ocean from Kenya and Tanzania, the Comores, Réunion to Sri Lanka, Thailand and the Philippines.

== Habitat ==
This benthic species can be found at a depth of 3–30 meters.

== Gallery ==
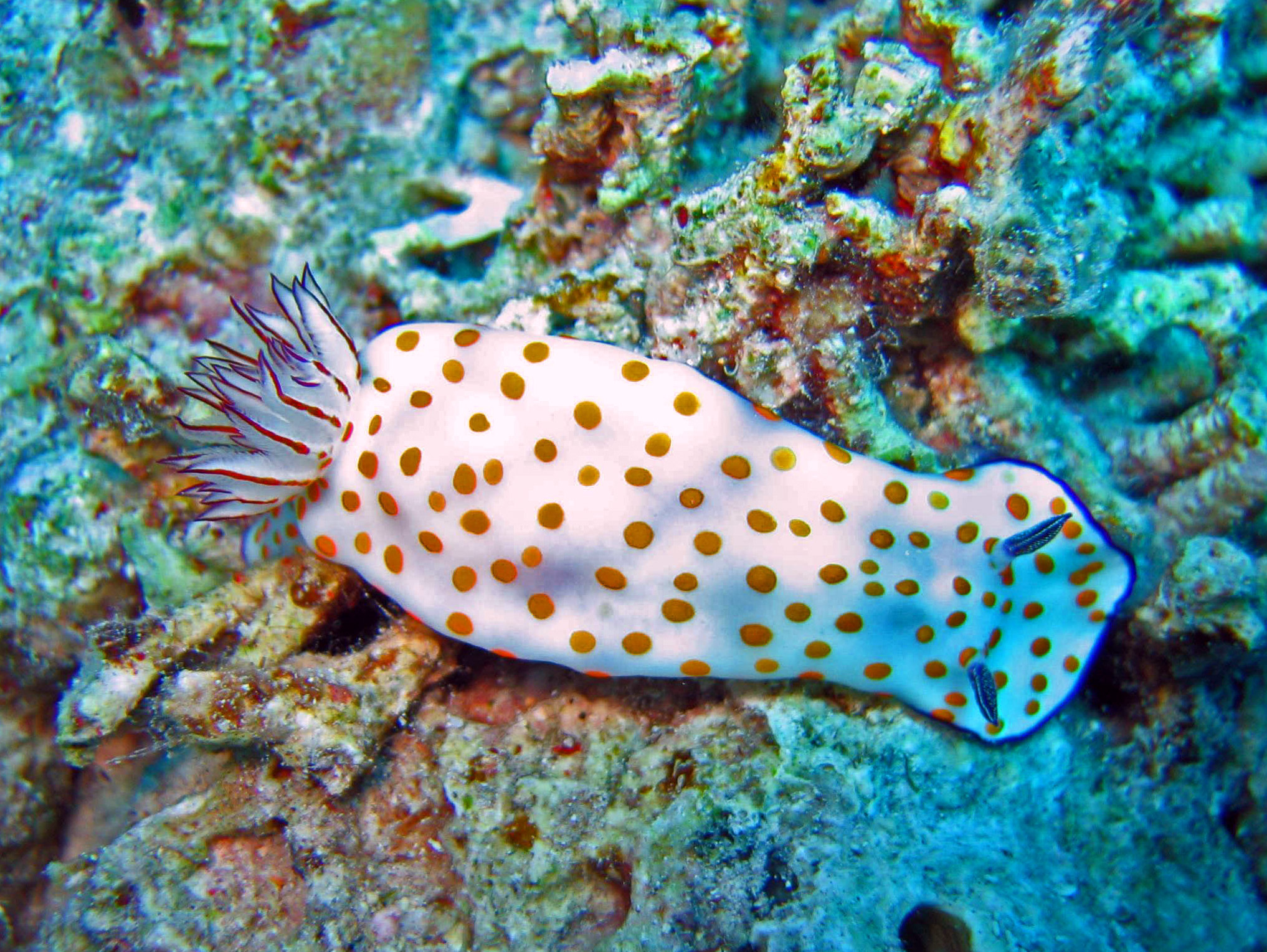
Hypselodoris pulchella in Sharm El Sheik. Dorsal view

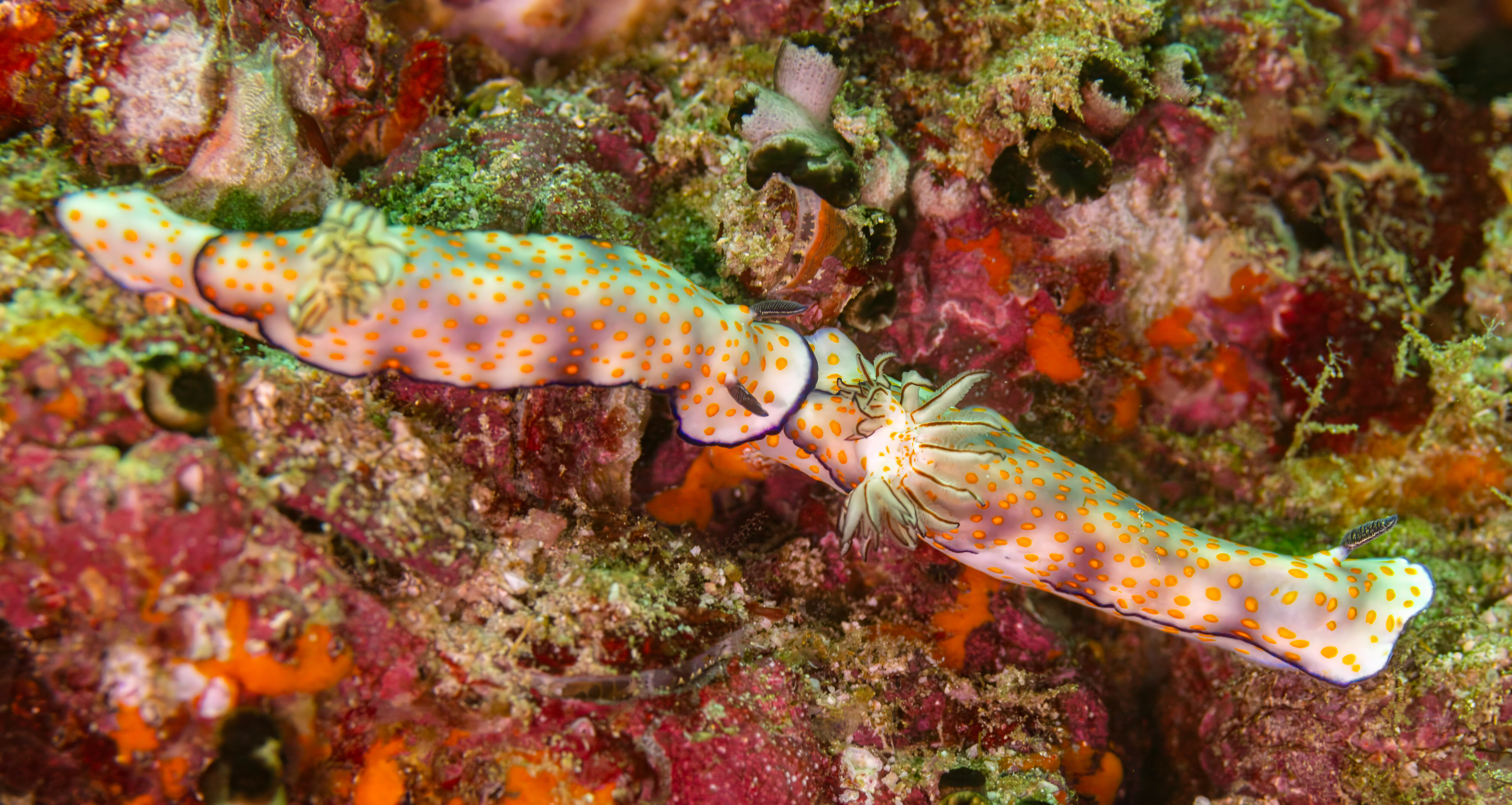
Two individuals of Hypselodoris pulchella displaying the typical ‘trailing behaviour’

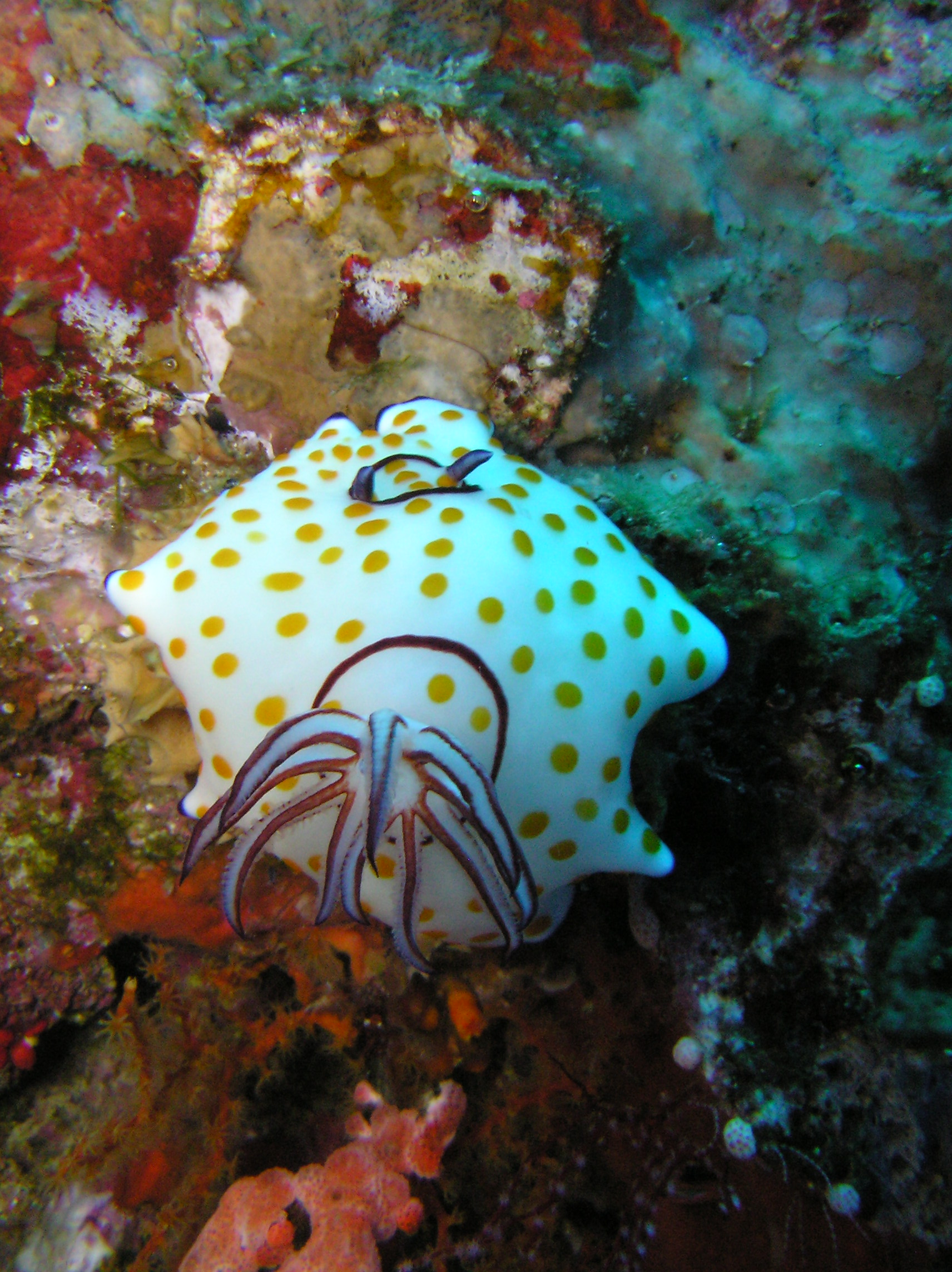
The nudibranch, Goniobranchus annulatus (Eliot, 1904), sometimes confused with H. pulchella

== See also ==
- Watch: Risbecia pulchella (synonym of Hypselodoris pulchella), Indian Ocean, UAE.
- Watch: Two Risbecia pulchella (synonym of Hypselodoris pulchella), Indian Ocean, UAE.
- Watch: Mating Risbecia pulchella (synonym of Hypselodoris pulchella), Indian Ocean, UAE.
- Watch: Moving Risbecia pulchella (synonym of Hypselodoris pulchella), Indian Ocean, UAE.
