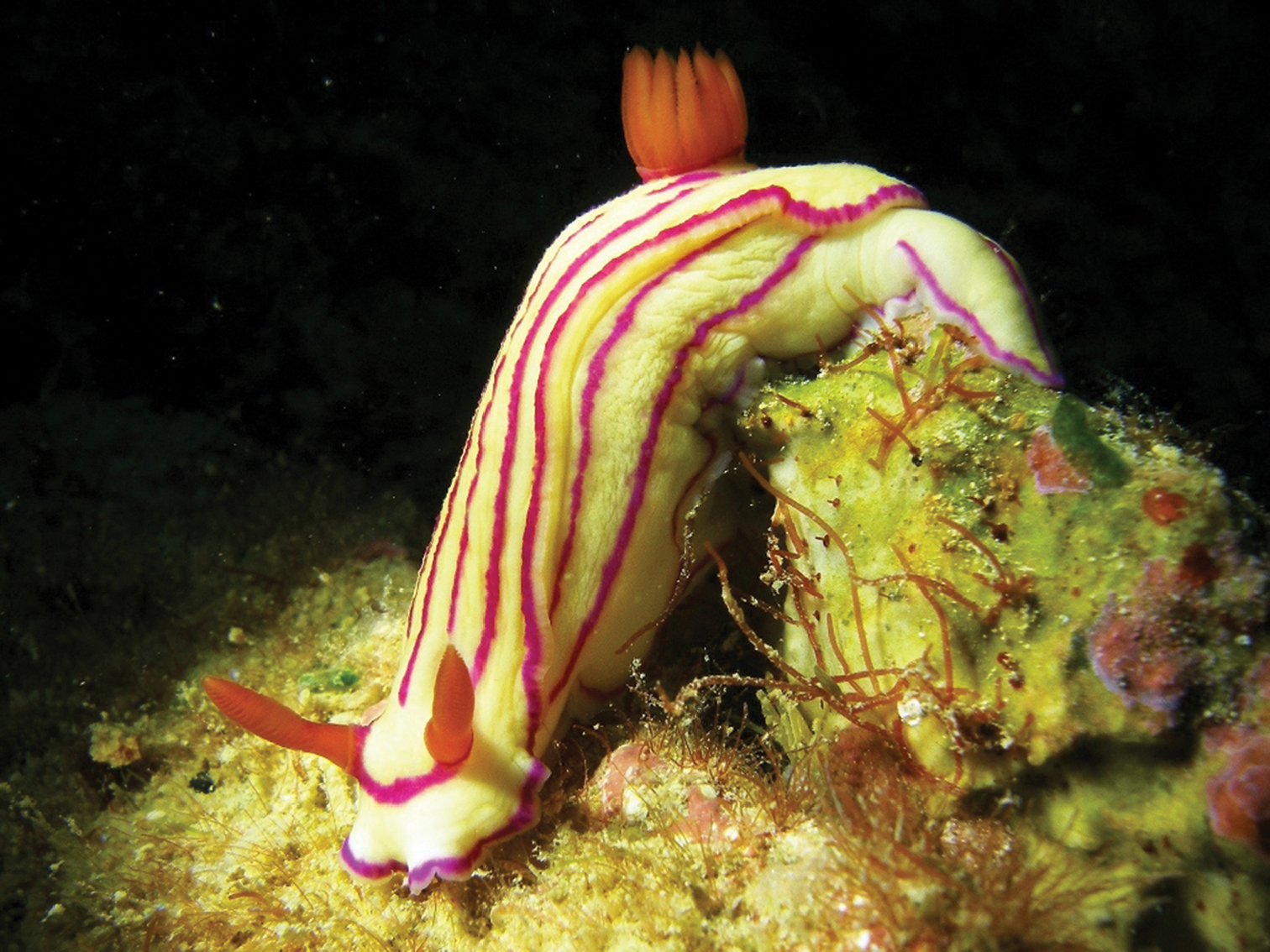
- Hypselodoris maridadilus

Scientific classification
- Kingdom: Animalia
- Phylum: Mollusca
- Class: Gastropoda
- Order: Nudibranchia
- Family: Chromodorididae
- Genus: Hypselodoris
- Species: H. maridadilus

Binomial name
- Hypselodoris maridadilus Rudman, 1977

= Hypselodoris maridadilus =

Species of gastropod

Hypselodoris maridadilus is a species of colourful sea slug or dorid nudibranch, a marine gastropod mollusk in the family Chromodorididae. It feeds on sponges.

== Distribution ==
This nudibranch is found in the Western Indian Ocean, from South Africa to the Red Sea.

== Description ==
Hypselodoris maridadilus has a white to cream or yellow body with five purple longitudinal lines, and a purple bordered mantle. The gills and rhinophores are bright orange. It is similar in appearance to Hypselodoris whitei which differs slightly in having white-tipped rhinophores and gills. This species can reach a total length of at least 35 mm (1.4 in).
