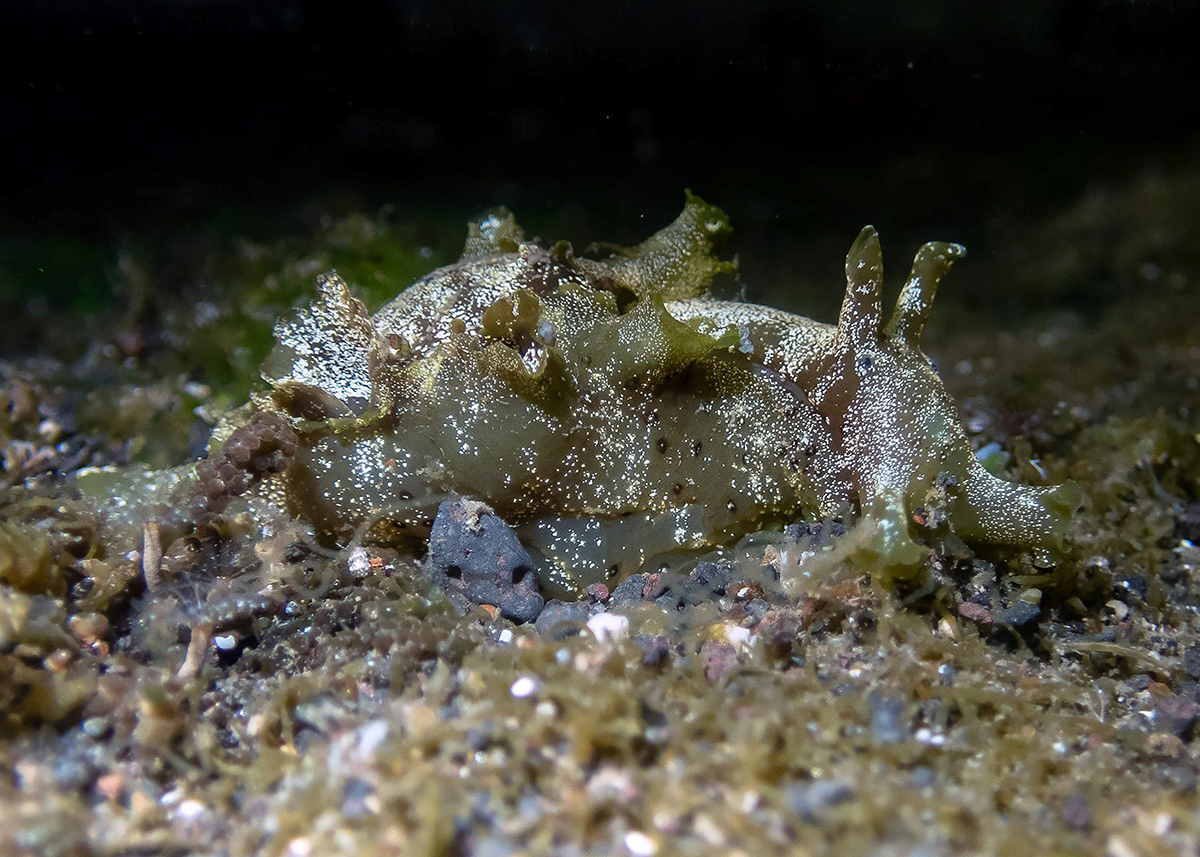

Scientific classification
- Kingdom: Animalia
- Phylum: Mollusca
- Class: Gastropoda
- Order: Aplysiida
- Family: Aplysiidae
- Genus: Aplysia
- Species: A. oculifera

Binomial name
- Aplysia oculifera A. Adams & Reeve, 1850

Synonyms
- List: Aplysia lineolata A. Adams & Reeve, 1850; Aplysia nodifera A. Adams & Reeve, 1850; Tethys hirasei Baba, 1936

= Aplysia oculifera =

Species of gastropod

Aplysia oculifera is a species of gastropod belonging to the family Aplysiidae.

Aplysiidae, or more commonly called sea hares, can be identified by a seemingly lack of an outer shell but instead have a flat, internal shell closely resembling a plate that protects their mantle.

The Aplysia oculifera can come in different colors, but they share these distinct features: dots lining the body, rings around the head, and parapodia that are long and wavy. The species was detailed in the book The Zoology of the Voyage of H.M.S. Samarang written during the years of 1843–1846. British naturalists Arthur Adams and Lowell Reeve are credited with the first descriptions of the species. The species has been found in the Indian and Pacific oceans. There is very little known about this species with sparse publishings about their anatomy.

== Characteristics ==
Previous examinations of the species have seen the Aplysia oculifera in different colors such as: different shades of green, yellow, and brown. Large white spots tend to be distributed all along its body in clusters but lack any other distinct patterns.

== Habitat and feeding ==
The Aplysia oculifera can be found along coasts in the Indo-Pacific areas such as Hawaii, Japan, Korea, and it has even been spotted in coasts in the Red Sea where it is said to be endemic. They can be found in rocky intertidal zones and rely on marine algae to be present, however they have shown specific adaptations to be able to sustain themselves when food sources are scarce. Aplysia oculifera tend to be more active during the day when exposed to sunlight, compared to the hours of darkness.

Aplysia are known to feed on various species of marine algae. However, through several studies, it has been shown that Aplysia oculifera prefer green algae such as Ulva spp..

== Reproduction ==
They are known to be simultaneous hermaphrodites, which means that one individual has both sex parts and can act as the male or female as needed. They have been examined forming mating chains which is common among various Aplysia spp. Aplysia oculifera have complex reproductive organs with ovotestis, small and large hermaphroditic duct (tubes connecting different reproductive organs), nidamental glandular complex, and gametolytic glands. The penis of the Aplysia oculifera is external and can be extended and retracted as wanted due to the species having large retractor muscles.

One thing that sets this species apart from other Aplysia is that their gametes contain nurse cells in several stages of their life which is not commonly found in other species, but aids in successful fertilization and health of the offspring.

== Other research ==
Aplysia spp. contain a special defense mechanism where they have concentrated, toxic metabolites stored in their digestive glands due to the food they consume. These metabolites contain medically important compounds can be used in chemical defenses to fight off specific cancers. Due to this, Aplysia oculifera have been studied to try and pinpoint how to fight off cancers inside the human body using chemical defenses.
