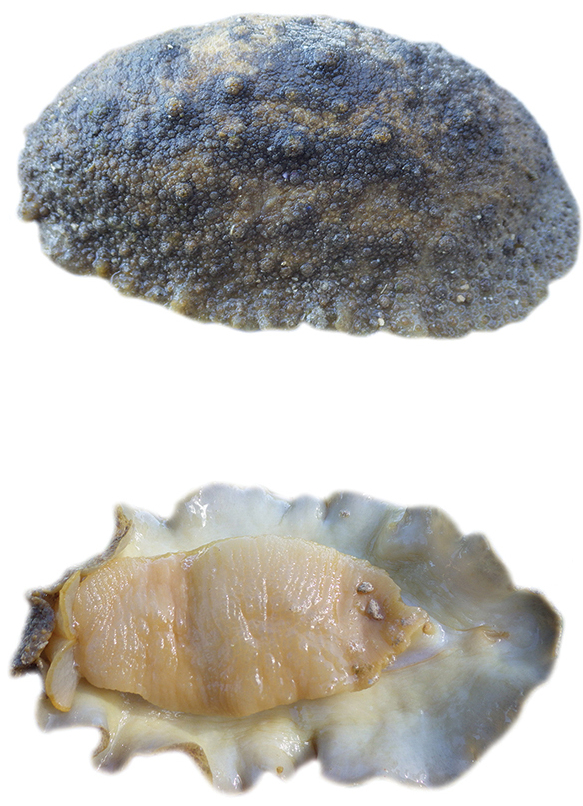

Scientific classification
- Kingdom: Animalia
- Phylum: Mollusca
- Class: Gastropoda
- Order: Systellommatophora
- Family: Onchidiidae
- Genus: Peronia
- Species: P. peronii

Binomial name
- Peronia peronii (Cuvier, 1804)

Synonyms
- Onchidium melanopneumon Bergh, 1884; Onchidium peronii Cuvier, 1804; Onchidium tonganum Quoy & Gaimard, 1832; Peronia corpulenta Gould, 1852; Peronia mauritiana Blainville, 1824

= Peronia peronii =

Species of gastropod

Peronia peronii, also called Scaphis punctata, is a species of air-breathing sea slug, a shell-less marine pulmonate gastropod mollusk in the family Onchidiidae.

== Distribution ==
This species is distributed in the Indian Ocean along Madagascar and Mozambique.
