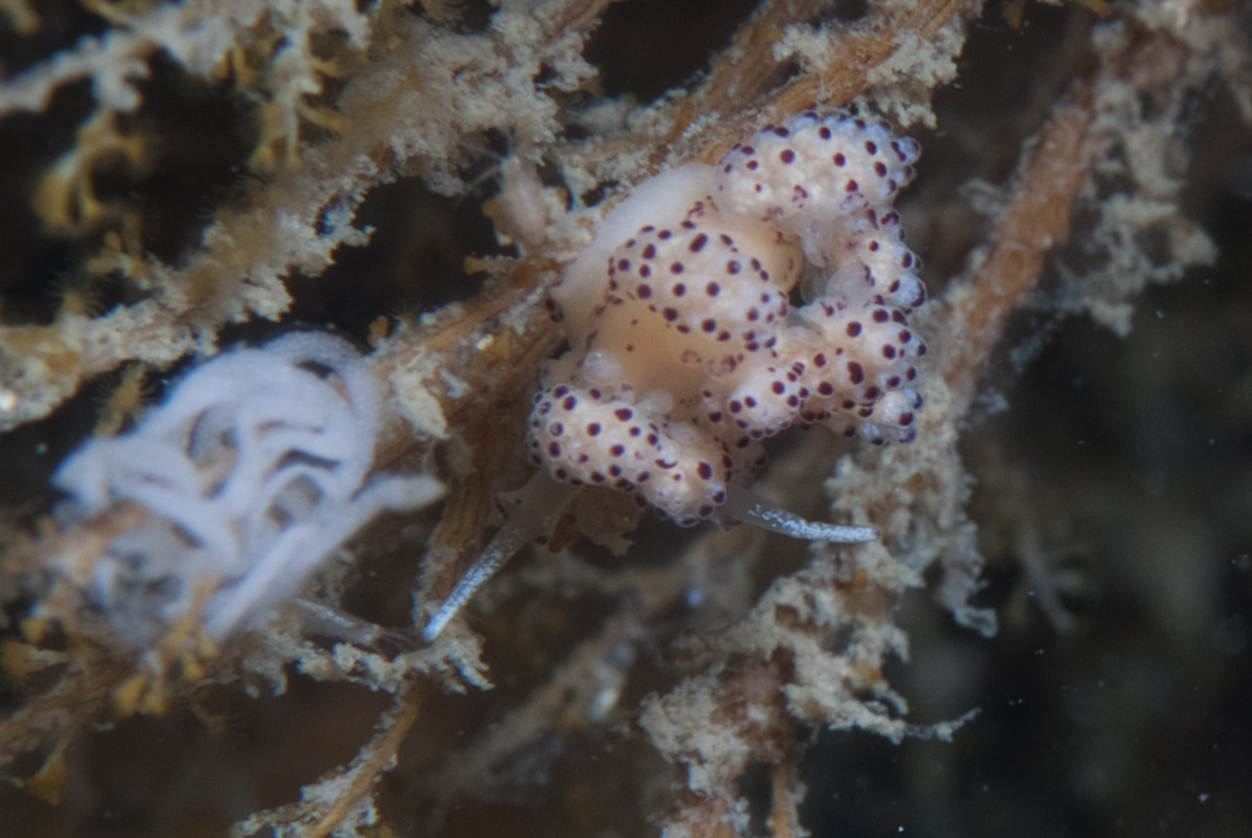
- Doto africoronata with egg ribbon

Scientific classification
- Kingdom: Animalia
- Phylum: Mollusca
- Class: Gastropoda
- Order: Nudibranchia
- Suborder: Dendronotacea
- Family: Dotidae
- Genus: Doto
- Species: D. africoronata

Binomial name
- Doto africoronata Shipman & Gosliner, 2015

Synonyms
- Doto coronata Gmelin, 1791 sensu Gosliner, 1987.

= Doto africoronata =

Species of mollusc

Doto africoronata is a species of small sea slug or nudibranch, a shell-less marine gastropod mollusc in the family Dotidae.

== Distribution ==
This species is known from around the South African coast where it is found from the Atlantic coast to Knysna. It is known from the intertidal to more than 25 m.

== Description ==
This species is a small (up to 15 mm) nudibranch, with grape-bunch-like clusters of cerata extending in pairs along the sides of the body. In all Doto the rhinophores extend from cup-like sheaths. Doto africoronata is translucent white in colour with mottling of dark red on the back and sides of the body. The ceratal tubercles are tipped with round red spots.
