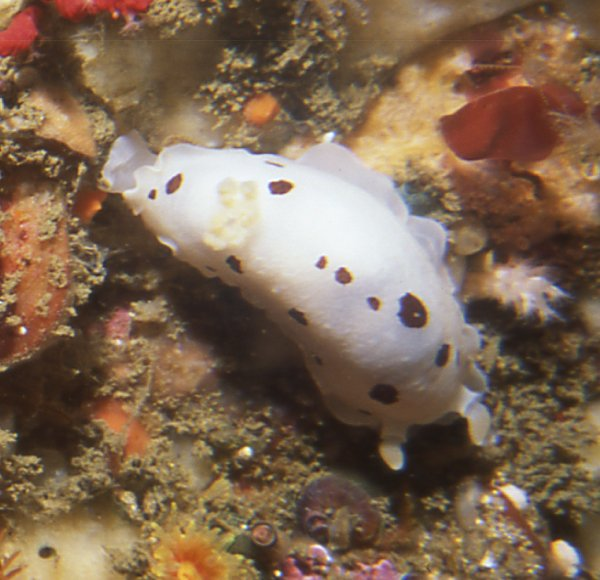

Scientific classification
- Kingdom: Animalia
- Phylum: Mollusca
- Class: Gastropoda
- Order: Nudibranchia
- Family: Dorididae
- Genus: Aphelodoris
- Species: A. sp. 1

Binomial name
- Aphelodoris sp. 1

= Chocolate-chip nudibranch =

Species of gastropod

The chocolate-chip nudibranch, Aphelodoris sp. 1, is an undescribed species of dorid nudibranch as designated by T.M. Gosliner in 1987. It is a marine gastropod mollusc in the family Dorididae. As of November 2009, it was undescribed by academics.

== Distribution ==
This species has been found around the southern African coast on both sides of the Cape Peninsula and off Port Elizabeth in 10–35 m of water.

== Description ==
The chocolate-chip nudibranch is a white-bodied smooth-skinned dorid with a few dark blotches of varying sizes on its notum. It has eight gills arranged around the anus and its rhinophores are perfoliate. It may reach a total length of 50 mm.

== Ecology ==
The chocolate-chip nudibranch feeds on sponges. This species is undescribed: it is not yet formally known in the scientific literature.
