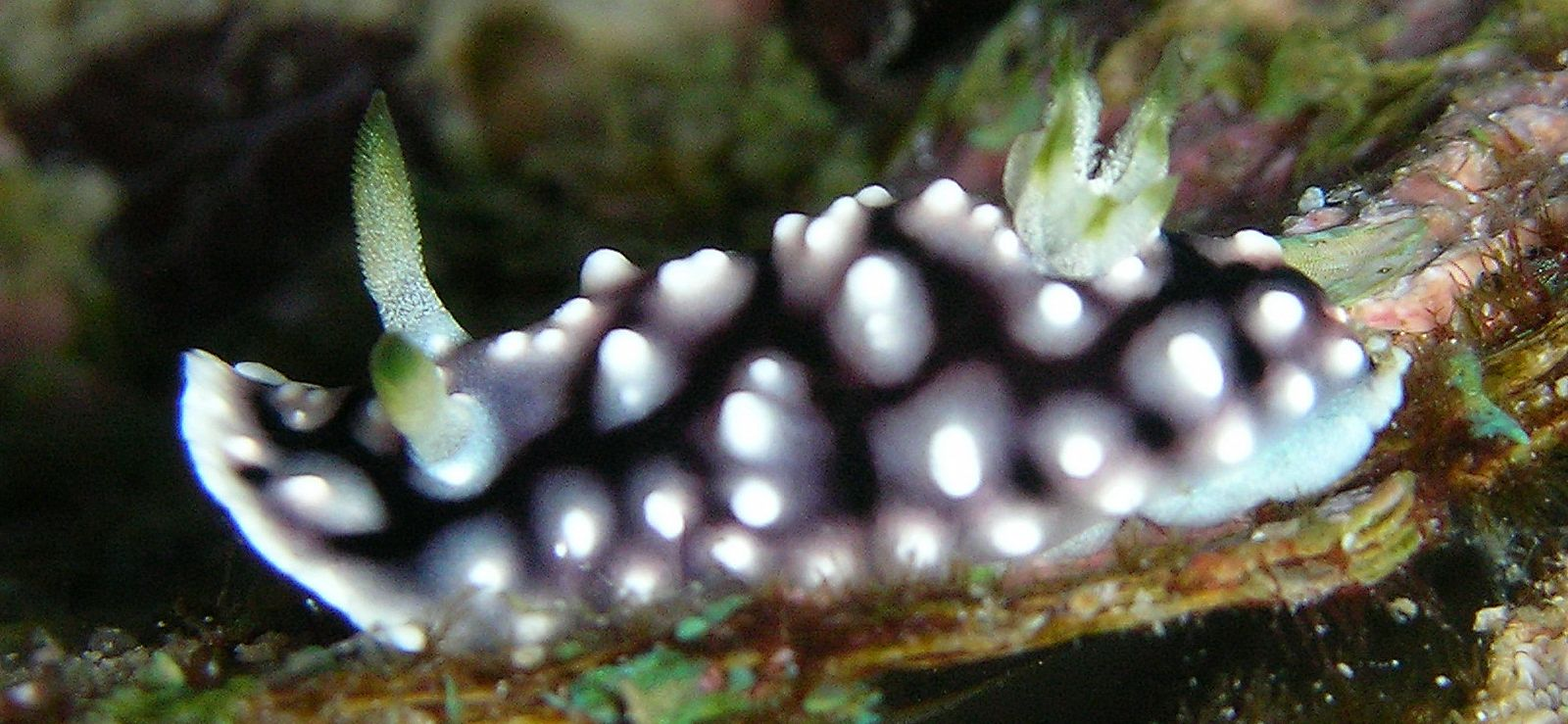
- Goniobranchus geometricus

Scientific classification
- Kingdom: Animalia
- Phylum: Mollusca
- Class: Gastropoda
- Order: Nudibranchia
- Family: Chromodorididae
- Genus: Goniobranchus
- Species: G. geometricus

Binomial name
- Goniobranchus geometricus ( Risbec, 1928)

Synonyms
- Chromodoris geometrica Risbec, 1928 (basionym)

= Goniobranchus geometricus =

Species of gastropod

Goniobranchus geometricus is a species of colourful sea slug, a dorid nudibranch, a marine gastropod mollusc in the family Chromodorididae.

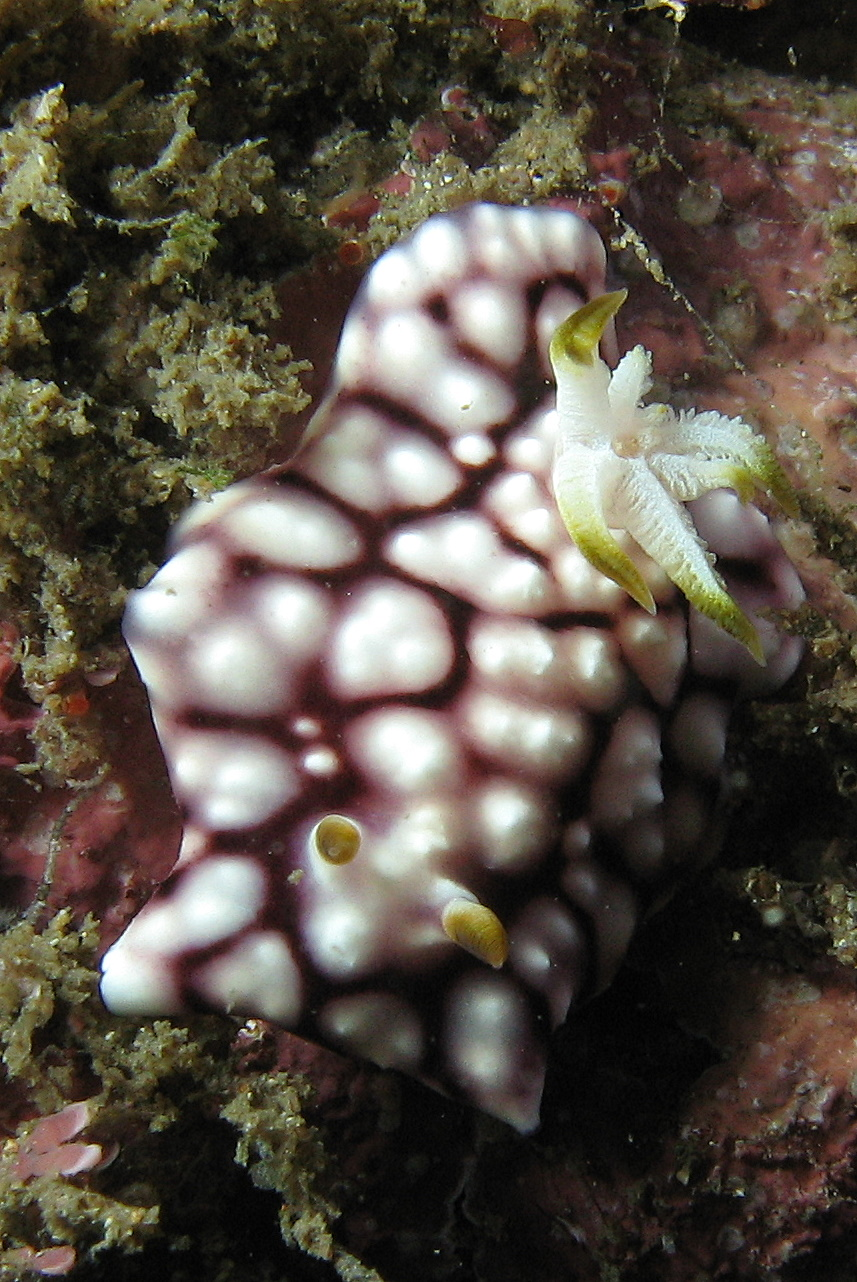
Goniobranchus geometricus

== Distribution ==
This species was described from New Caledonia. It is found throughout the Indian Ocean as well as the Western Pacific Ocean from the intertidal down to 30 m (98 ft).

== Description ==
Goniobranchus geometricus is a small nudibranch which may grow to a total length of 35mm. It is variably coloured, with the ground colour ranging from a creamy brown to purple, The mantle has numerous cream-coloured bumps and has a white margin. The gills and rhinophores are white to greenish. It is very similar to Goniobranchus conchyliatus but has green-grey rhinophores and gills whilst G. conchyliatus has red ones.

== Ecology ==
This animal feeds on the sponge Chelonaplysilla violacea.
