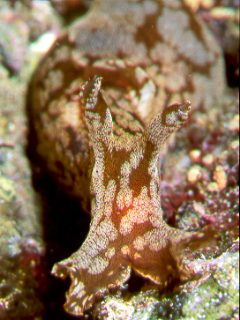

Scientific classification
- Kingdom: Animalia
- Phylum: Mollusca
- Class: Gastropoda
- Order: Aplysiida
- Family: Aplysiidae
- Genus: Aplysia
- Species: A. juliana

Binomial name
- Aplysia juliana (Quoy & Gaimard, 1832)

Synonyms
- List: Aplysia brunnea Hutton, 1874; Aplysia hamiltoni T. W. Kirk, 1882; Aplysia juliana var. quoyana Engel & Eales, 1957; Aplysia petiti Risbec, 1929; Aplysia sandvichensis G. B. Sowerby II, 1869; Aplysia sibogae Bergh, 1905; Aplysia woodii Bergh, 1907; Metaplysia badistes Pilsbry, 1951; Syphonota bipes Pease, 1860; Tethys capensis O'Donoghue, 1929

= Aplysia juliana =

Species of gastropod

Aplysia juliana, the walking sea hare, is a species of sea hare, a marine gastropod in the family Aplysiidae.

== Description ==
This sea hare has no purple gland and therefore cannot produce ink, just milky secretions. The posterior end of the foot in this species can act as a sucker.

The color of this sea hare is very often brown with paler spots, but it can be various other shades including plain black all over.

The maximum recorded length is 300 mm.

== Distribution ==
Distribution of this species is cosmopolitan, circumtropical in all warm seas.

A. juliana inhabits tidal pools and seagrass beds, to a depth of 20 metres.

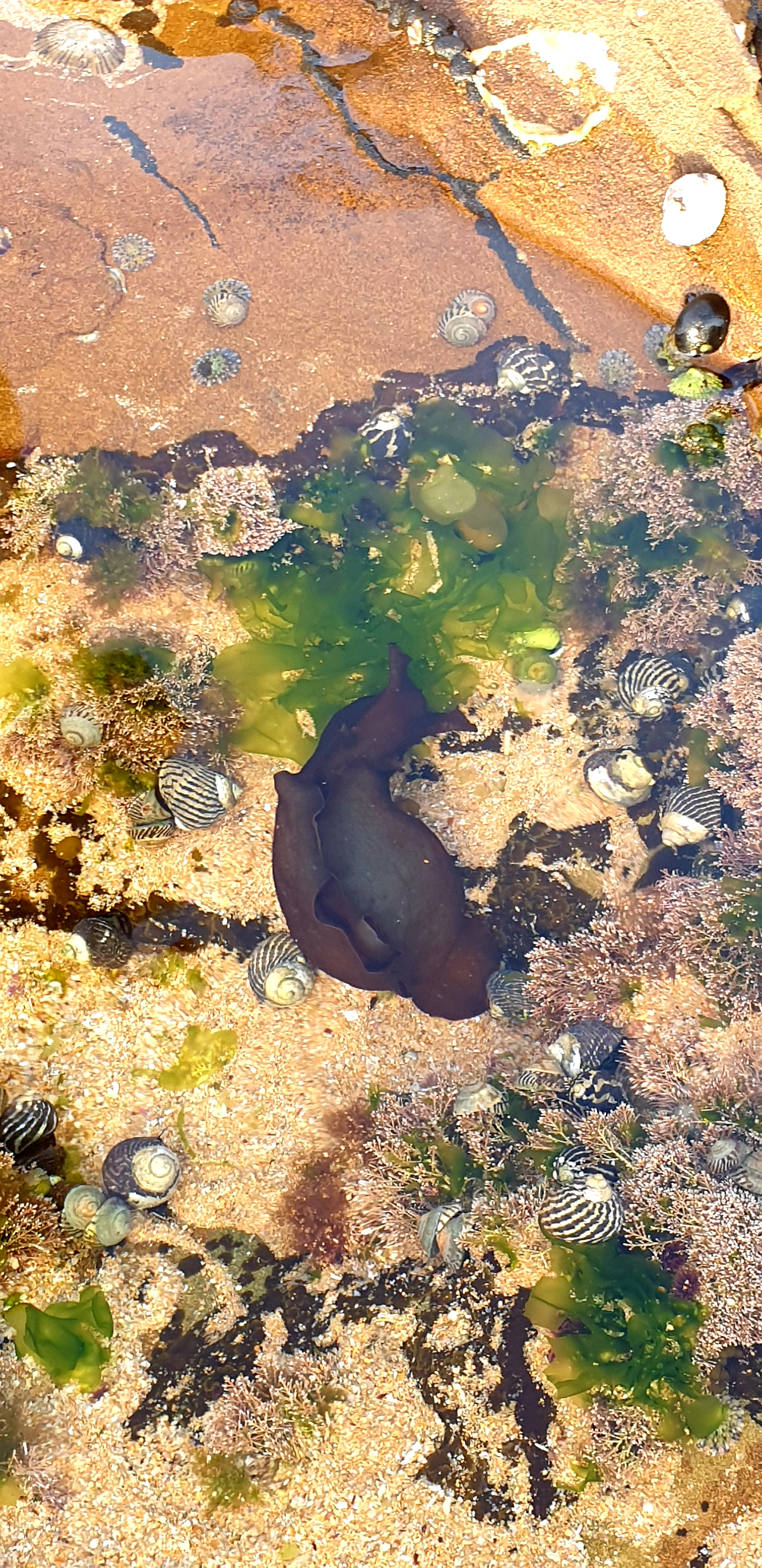
Aplysia juliana in rock pool in North Avoca, NSW, Australia
