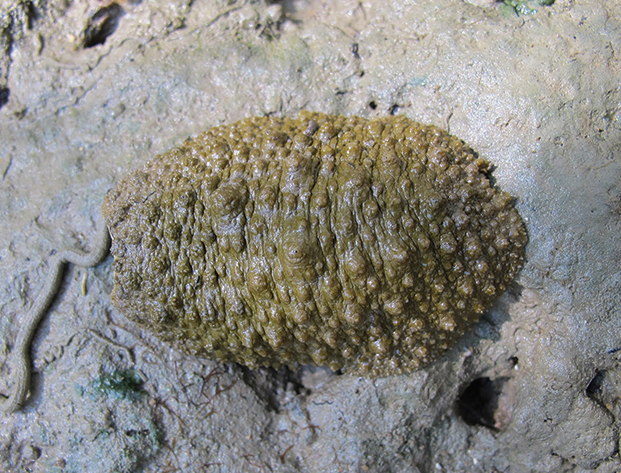
- Peronia willani

Scientific classification
- Kingdom: Animalia
- Phylum: Mollusca
- Class: Gastropoda
- Order: Systellommatophora
- Family: Onchidiidae
- Genus: Peronia; Fleming, 1822

Synonyms
- Eudrastus Gistel, 1848; Lessonia Labbé, 1934; Lessonina Starobogatov, 1976; Onchis Férussac, 1822; Paraperonia Starobogatov, 1976; Quoya Labbé, 1934; Quoyella Starobogatov, 1976 (unnecessary replacement name for Quoya Labbé, 1934, by Starobogatov by Starobogatov treated as a junior homonym of "Quoya Deshayes, 1843"; the latter is in fact an incorrect subsequent spelling of Quoyia Gray, 1839 [Planaxidae]); Scaphis Starobogatov, 1976

= Peronia =

Genus of gastropods

Peronia is a genus of air-breathing sea slugs, a shell-less marine pulmonate gastropod molluscs in the family Onchidiidae. These slugs differ from other onchidiid slugs in having branched "gills" on their dorsal side, although these can be retracted. More than two dozen species of Peronia have been described from the Indo-West Pacific, but a recent revision of the genus determined that 21 of these names are synonyms. Nine species of Peronia are recognized, most of which can differentiated only by examining their internal anatomy or with DNA sequencing.

== Species ==
The following species are species currently recognized within the genus Peronia:

- Peronia anomala Labbé, 1934
- Peronia griffithsi Dayrat & Goulding, 2017
- Peronia madagascariensis (Labbé, 1934)
- Peronia okinawensis Dayrat & Goulding, 2020
- Peronia peronii (Cuvier, 1804)
- Peronia platei (Hoffman, 1928)
- Peronia setoensis Dayrat & Goulding, 2020
- Peronia sydneyensis Dayrat & Goulding, 2020
- Peronia verruculata (Cuvier, 1830)
- Peronia willani Dayrat & Goulding, 2020
