= Notum =

Anatomic term in insect and nudibranch anatomy

The notum (plural nota) is the dorsal portion of an insect's thoracic segment, or the dorsal surface of the body of nudibranch gastropods. The word "notum" is always applied to dorsal structures; in other words structures that are part of the back of an animal, as opposed to being part of the animal's ventral surface, or underside.

This word is used in entomology, the study of insects, and in malacology, the study of mollusks. In malacology the word is used to describe the back of the body of the taxonomic group of marine, shell-less gastropods that are known as nudibranchs.

== In insects ==
In entomology, the notum is the dorsal portion of an insect's thoracic segment. The pterothoracic nota (comprising the meso- and metathoracic segments) have two main divisions—the anterior wing-bearing alinotum and the posterior phragma-bearing postnotum. The phragma, or endotergite, is a transverse infolding of the intersegmental sclerite, and its main function is to provide a reinforcing basis of attachment for the dorsal longitudinal muscles. Accordingly, phragmata tend to be best developed in actively flying insect species.

In most winged insects, the structure of each successive notum is quite variable; in the Neoptera, the main flight muscles insert on the notum, so the segment that bears the main pair of wings is typically the one with the most highly developed notum. For example, in Diptera, Hymenoptera, and Lepidoptera, the mesonotum is the most hypertrophied sclerite, and is commonly called the scutum. However, there are other groups of insects in which, for reasons other than flight, the pronotum is hypertrophied, such as in all beetles (Coleoptera), and most treehoppers (family Membracidae, order Hemiptera).

The notum on the first thoracic segment is called the pronotum, that on the second the mesonotum, and the third metanotum.

== In nudibranch gastropods ==
Nudibranchs are a large group of sea slugs, shell-less marine gastropod mollusks in the clade Nudibranchia. The dorsal surface of the body of nudibranchs is known as the notum.

== See also ==
- Insect morphology
- Tergum
