= Tochuina =

Scientific classification
- Kingdom: Animalia
- Phylum: Mollusca
- Class: Gastropoda
- Order: Nudibranchia
- Suborder: Tritoniacea
- Family: Tritoniidae
- Genus: Tochuina; Odhner, 1963

Species
- See text

Genus of gastropods

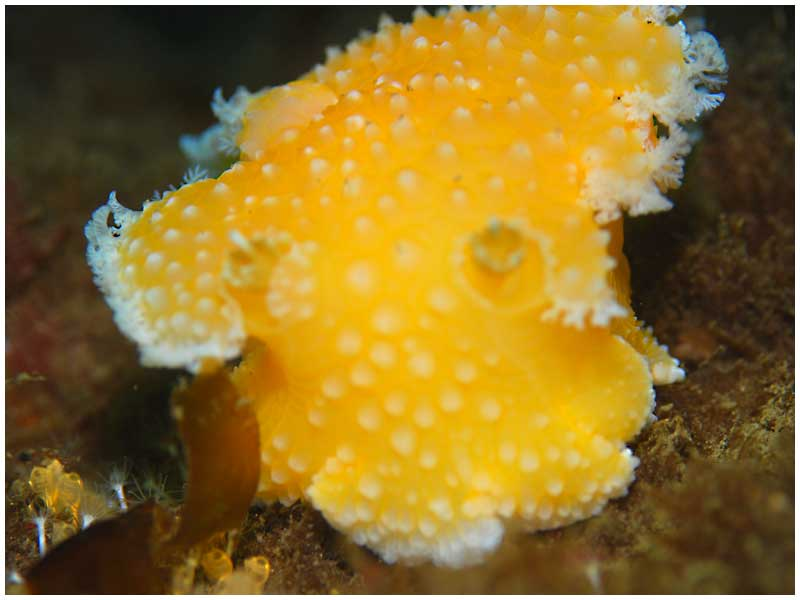
Tochuina tetraquetra

Tochuina is a genus of sea slugs, tritonid nudibranchs, marine gastropod mollusks in the family Tritoniidae.

== Taxonomy ==
The species composition of Tochuina was clarified in 2020 as a result of an integrative taxonomic study of the family Tritoniidae. Tochuina differs from Tritonia in having a non-bilobed oral veil and the clade is supported by DNA phylogeny. An interesting finding was that the tritoniid genus Tochuina not only shows an intriguing morphological similarity to Doridoxa and Heterodoris but clusters close to these genera, which themselves cluster with the family Arminidae, in a molecular tree within the Dendronotoidea.

== Species ==
Species within the genus Tochuina include:

- Tochuina gigantea (Bergh, 1904)
- Tochuina nigritigris (Valdés, Lundsten & Wilson, 2018)
- Tochuina nigromaculata (Roginskaya, 1984)

Species placed in synonymy:

- Tochuina tetraquetra (Pallas, 1788) accepted as Tritonia tetraquetra (Pallas, 1788)
