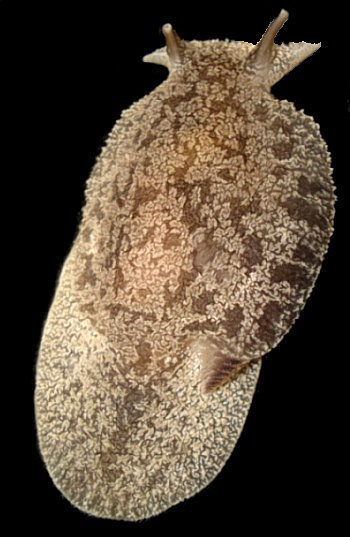

Scientific classification
- Kingdom: Animalia
- Phylum: Mollusca
- Class: Gastropoda
- Order: Pleurobranchida
- Family: Pleurobranchaeidae
- Genus: Pleurobranchaea
- Species: P. maculata

Binomial name
- Pleurobranchaea maculata (Quoy & Gaimard, 1832)

Synonyms
- Pleurobranchaea dorsalis J. K. Allan, 1933; Pleurobranchaea novaezealandiae Cheeseman, 1878; Pleurobranchaea novaezealandiae var. granulosa Bergh, 1900; Pleurobranchidium maculatum Quoy & Gaimard, 1832

= Pleurobranchaea maculata =

Species of gastropod

Pleurobranchaea maculata, or the grey side-gilled slug, is a species of sea slug, specifically a side-gill slug or notaspidean. It is a marine gastropod mollusc in the family Pleurobranchaeidae.

== Distribution ==
This species occurs in New Zealand, including around the North Island and South Island, as well as south-eastern Australia, China, Sri Lanka and Japan. In 2009, it was reported far outside its native range, on the coast of Argentina from where it spread rapidly, currently encompassing ca. 2,000 km along the southwestern Atlantic coast.

== Taxonomy ==
Pleurobranchaea maculata (Quoy & Gaimard, 1832) was first published as Pleurobranchidium maculatum Quoy & Gaimard, 1832 by Jean René Constant Quoy and Joseph Paul Gaimard, who were French naturalists and surgeons aboard the first voyage of the Astrolabe (1826–1829). Synonyms include Pleurobranchaea dorsalis and P. novaezealandiae.

== Habitat ==
This side-gill slug is found intertidally in harbours and to depths of up to 6 m or deeper off rocky coasts. It is often washed ashore during spring storms.

== Description ==
This marine slug is 80 to 100 mm in length, with southern specimens somewhat larger. Its colour is a mottled pale grey, densely patterned with short, brown broken lines. The wedge-shaped head has two sensory tentacles or rhinophores. The mantle is smooth in texture, but covered with folds and puckers, and the foot extends well beyond it. There is no remnant of a shell, and the feathery gill is tucked under the right side of the mantle.

== Ecology ==
This slug is an opportunistic carnivore and eats other soft-bodied invertebrates, especially sea anemones but will take marine worms, mussels, dead or dying animals, and other Pleurobrachaea sea slugs. P.eurbrancheata maculata produces small eggs that hatch after about a week, becoming planktotrophic larvae for the next three weeks before settling. It lives for 2–3 years and dies after spawning in winter.

== Toxicity levels ==
In 2009, a major scare in the Auckland Region of New Zealand was sparked after several dogs died of tetrodotoxin poisoning after eating Pleurobranchaea maculata on beaches. Children and pet owners were asked to avoid beaches, and recreational fishing was also interrupted for a time. After exhaustive analysis, it was found that these particular sea slugs must have ingested tetrodotoxin likely when feeding on dead fishes, as such poisoning has not occurred again.

== Genetic structure ==
In New Zealand, northern and southern populations could be differentiated genetically using microsatellite DNA markers, however mitochondrial DNA markers showed instead a star-shaped network suggesting population expansion during the Pleistocene. Thus, differences in toxicity of individuals among regions do not signify different species but instead are likely due to differences in diet.

== Gallery ==
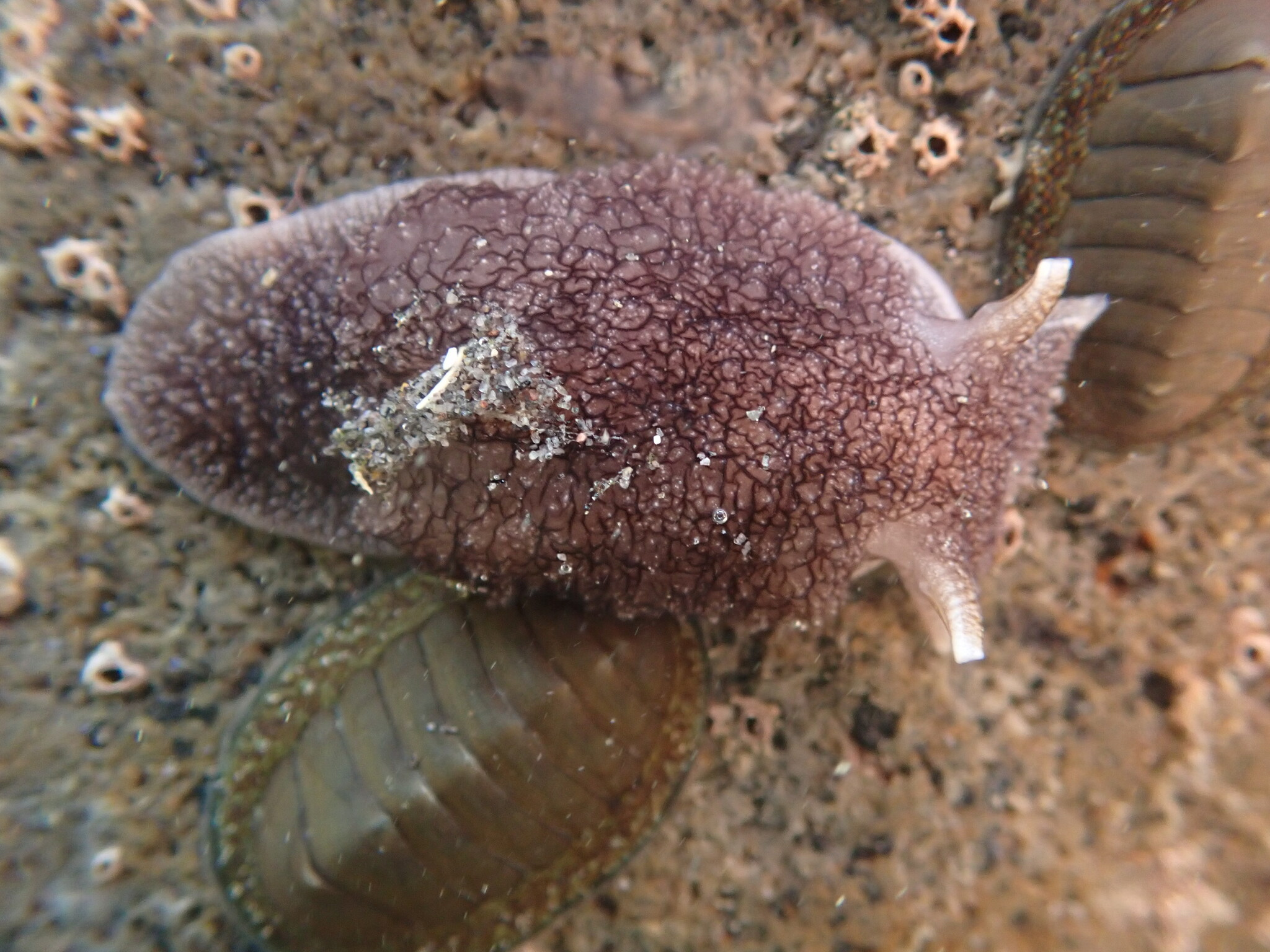
Dorsal view.

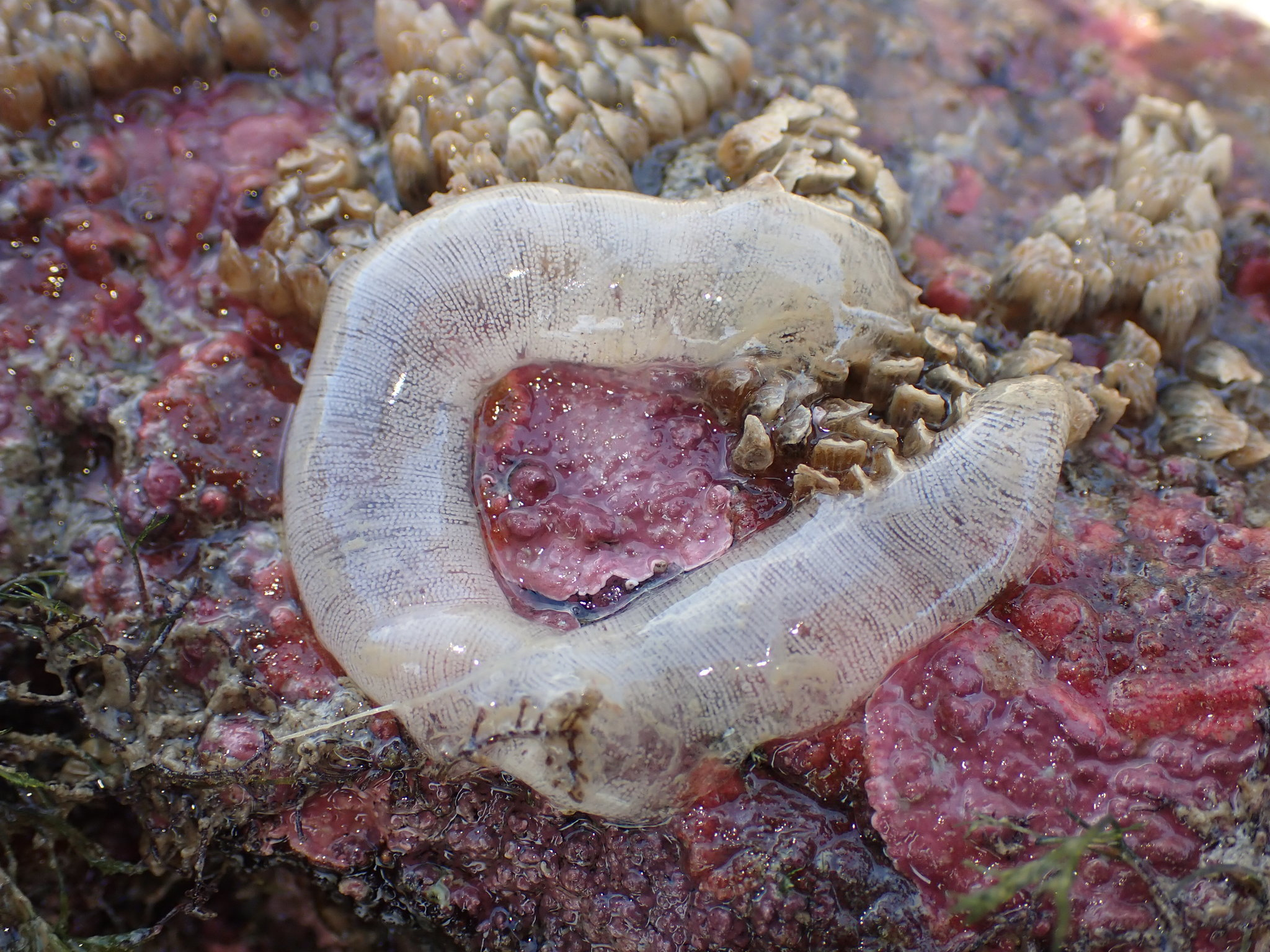
Egg mass.

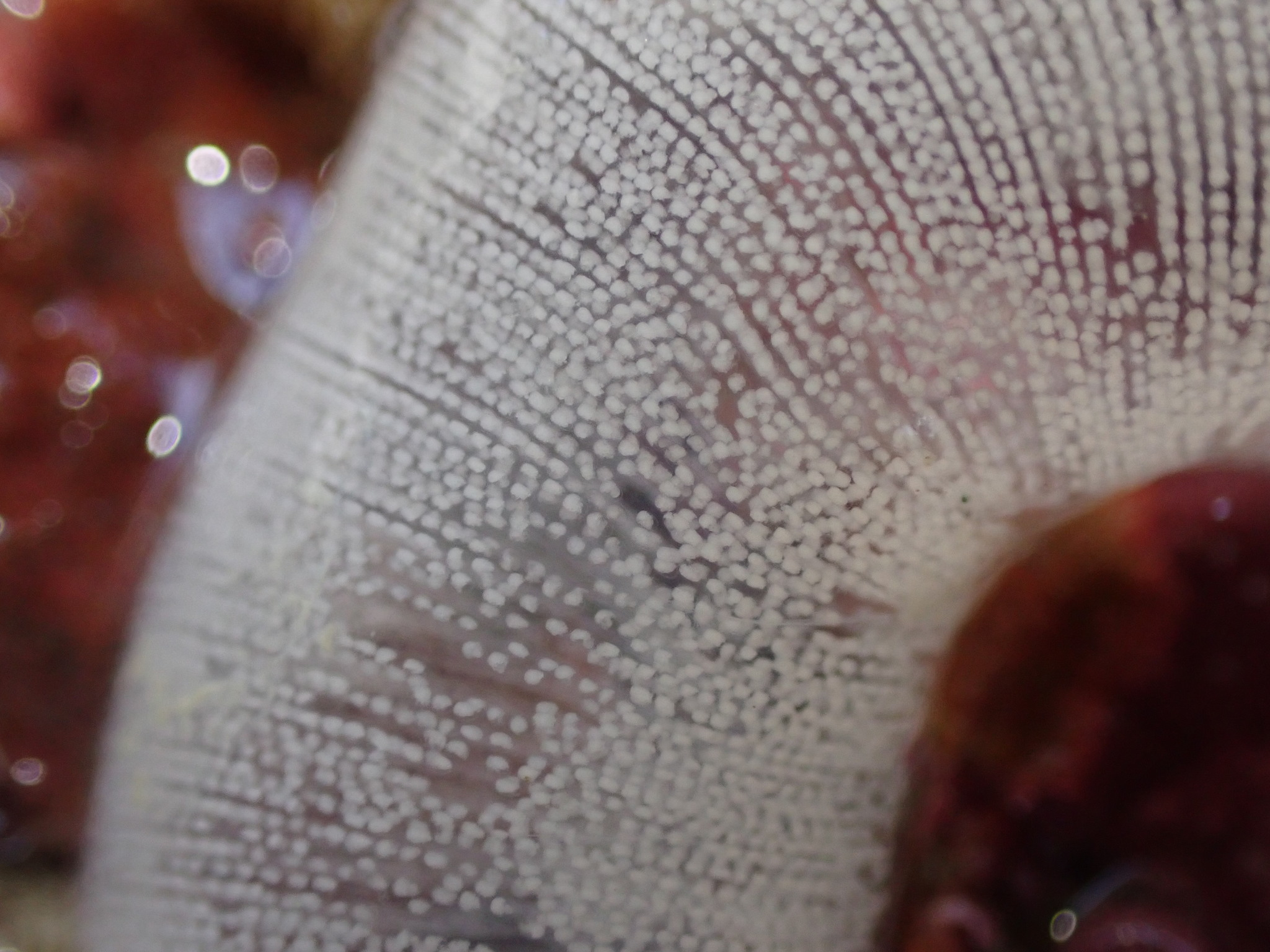
Individual eggs and embryos inside an egg mass.

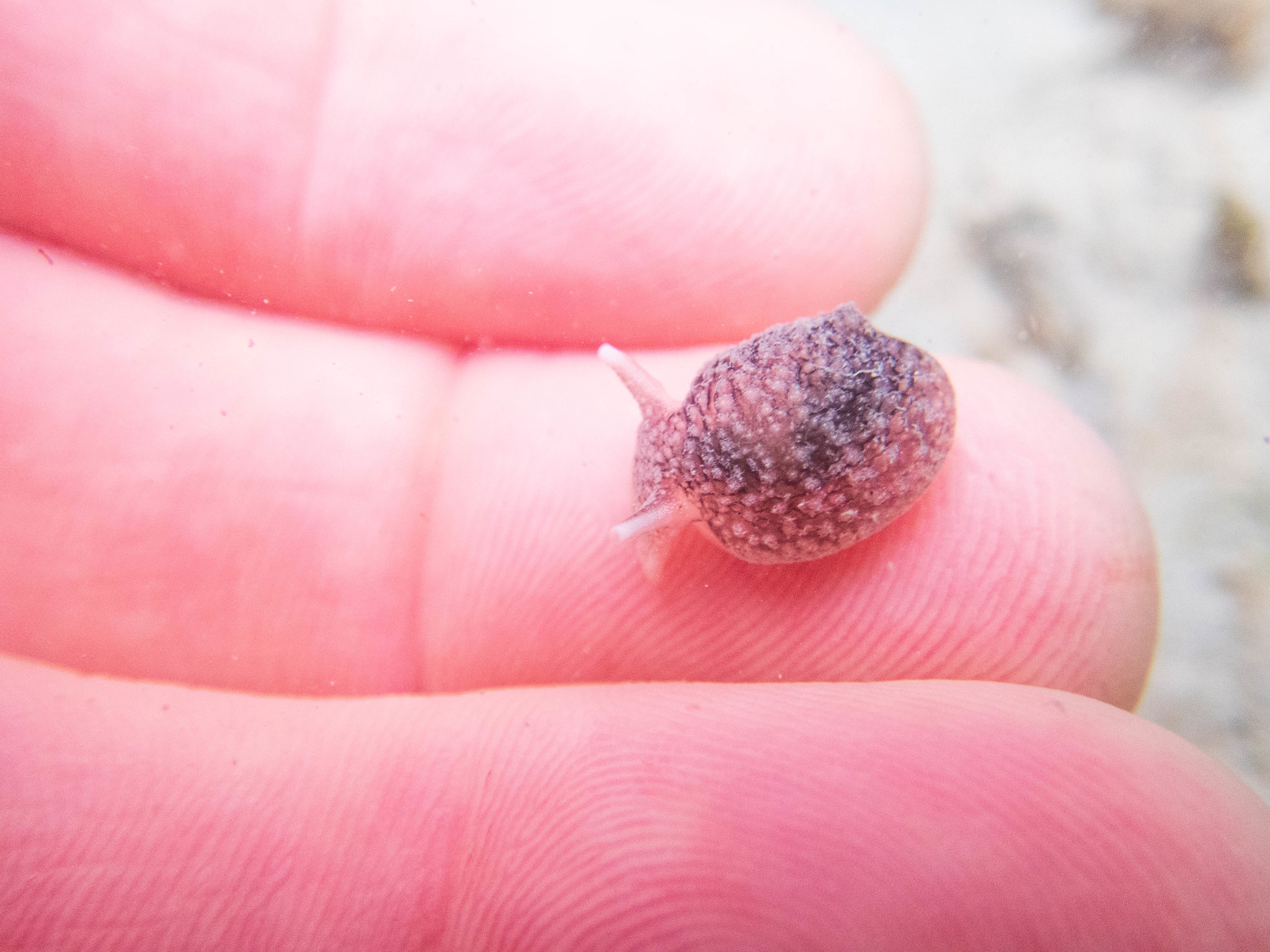
Small individual.

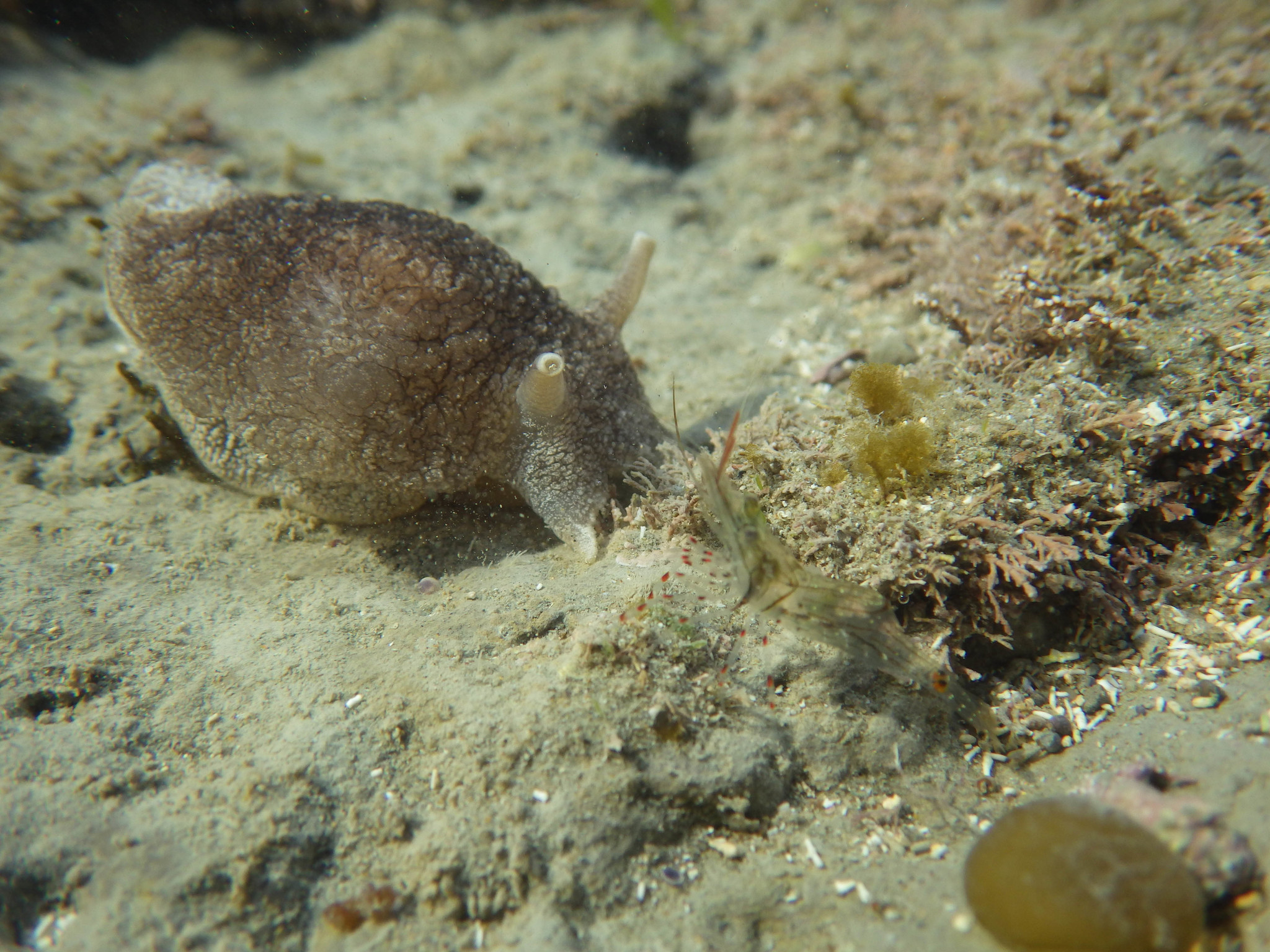
On the sea floor.

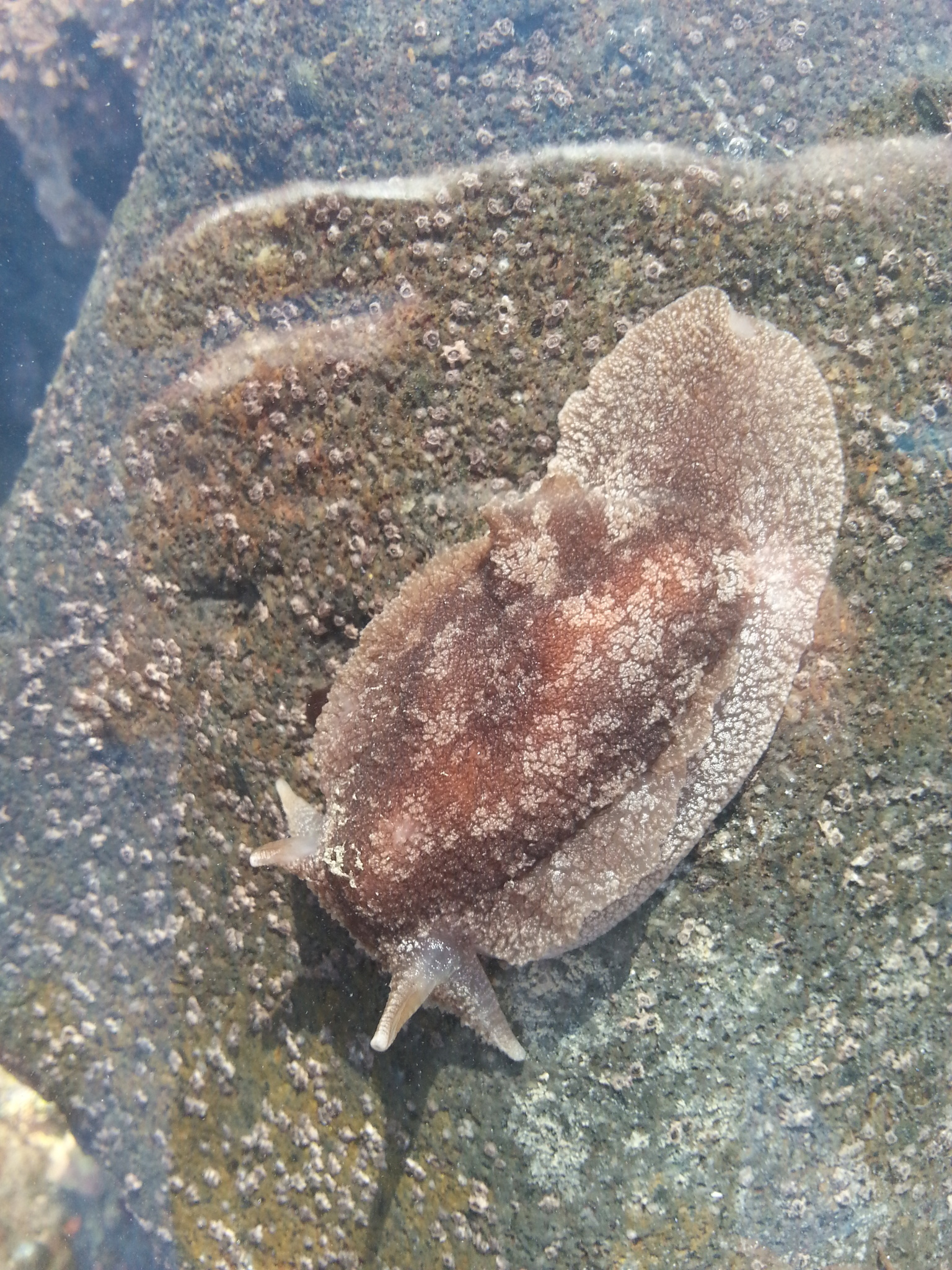
Dorsal view.

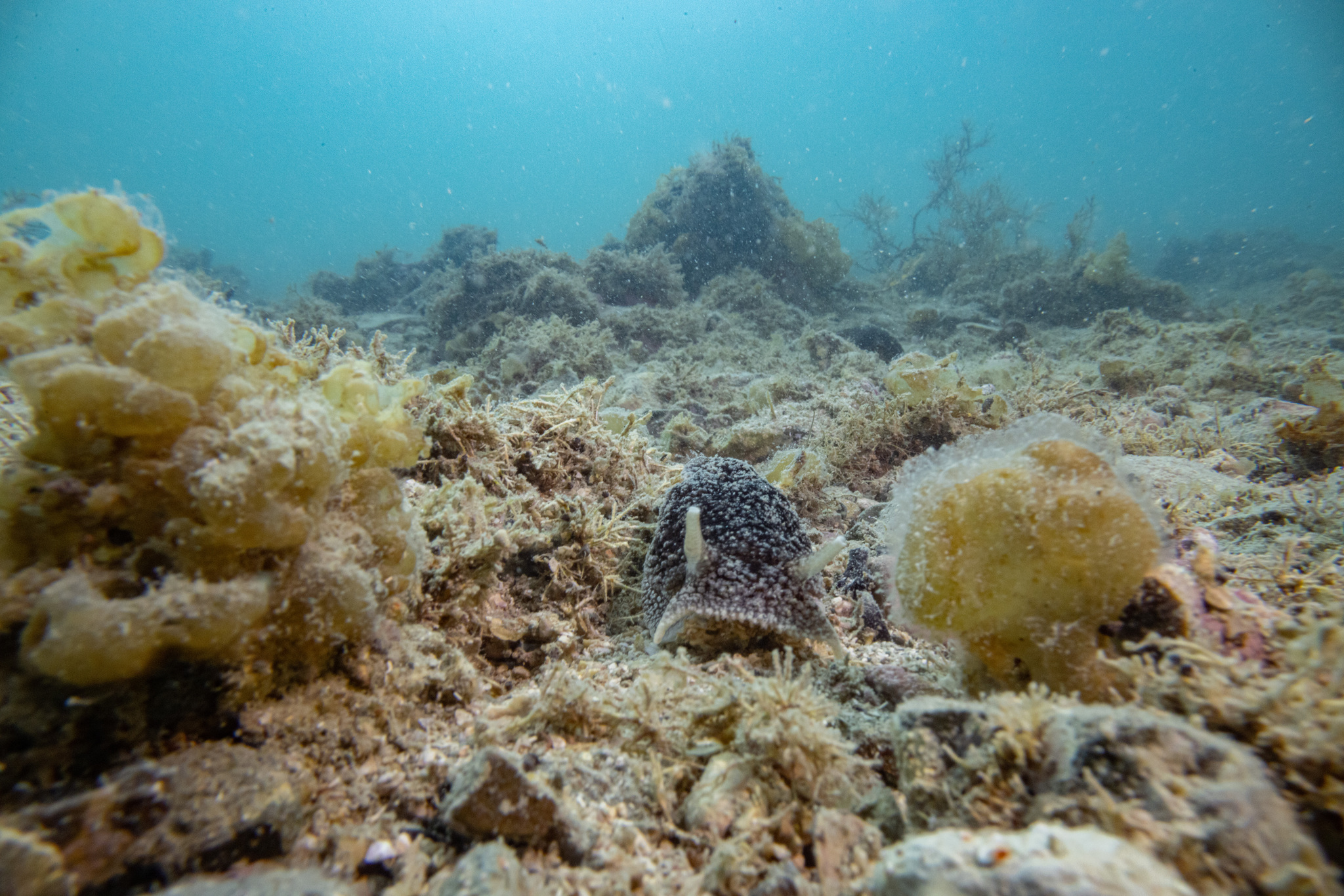
Habitat.

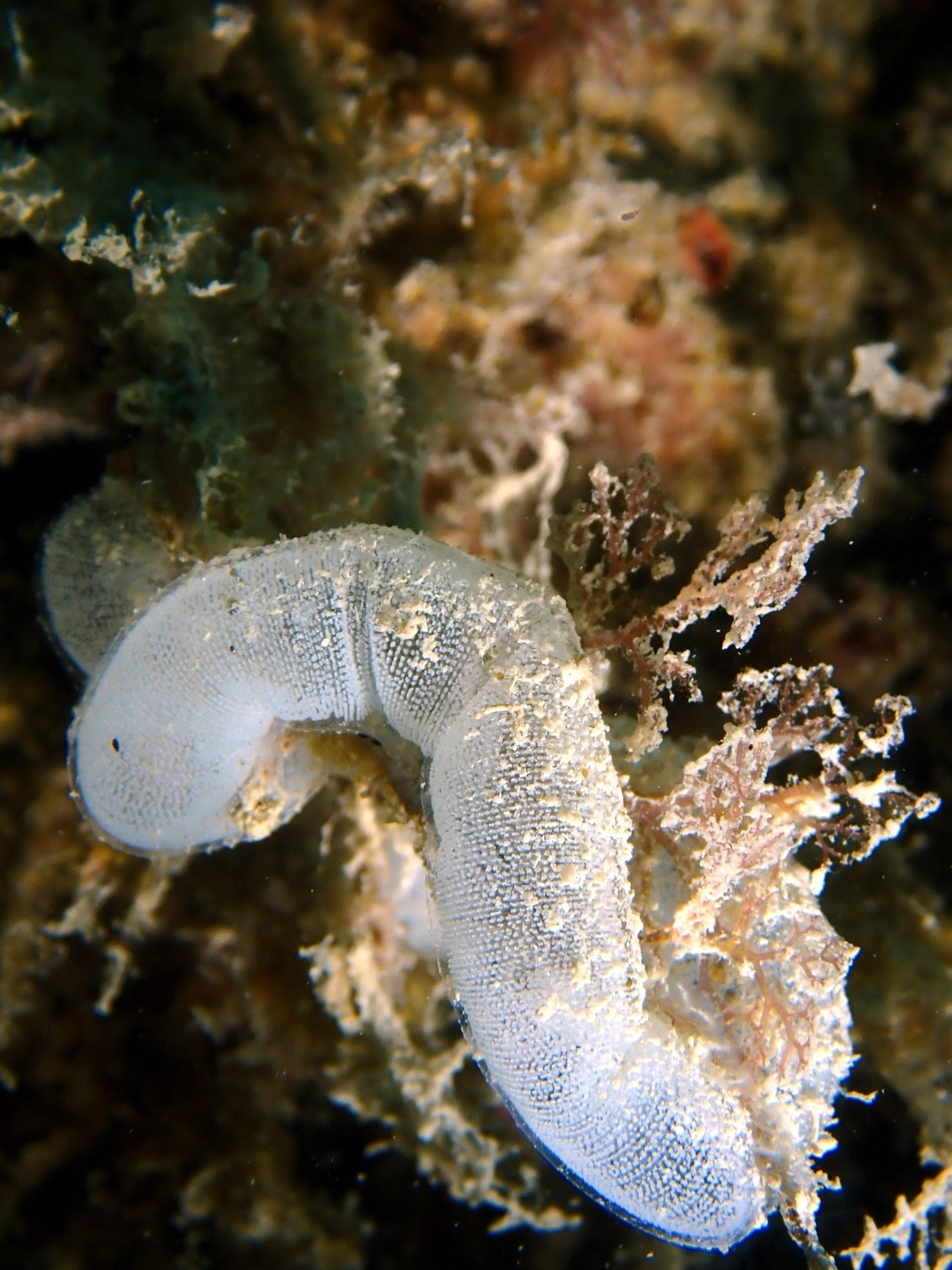
Egg case.
