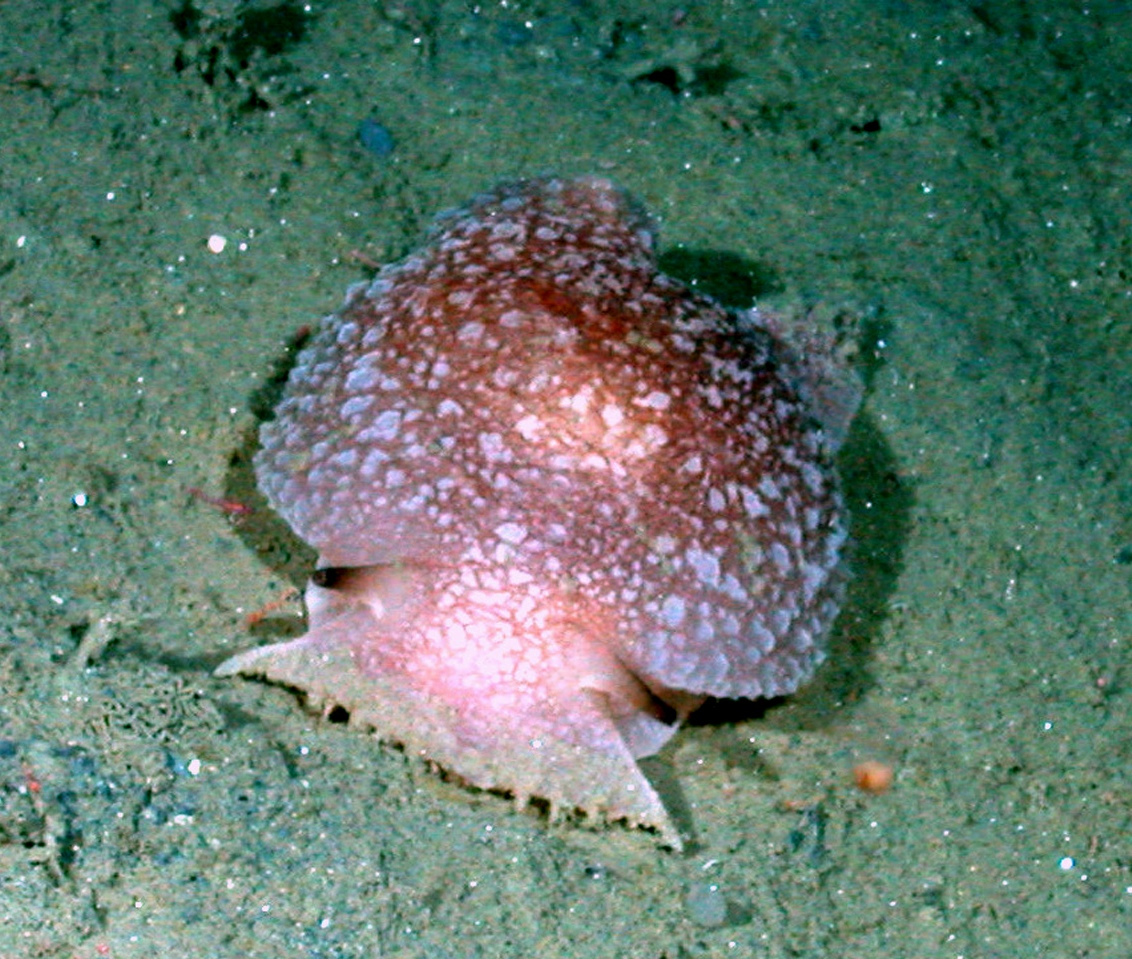

Scientific classification
- Kingdom: Animalia
- Phylum: Mollusca
- Class: Gastropoda
- Order: Pleurobranchida
- Family: Pleurobranchaeidae
- Genus: Pleurobranchaea
- Species: P. californica

Binomial name
- Pleurobranchaea californica MacFarland, 1966

= Pleurobranchaea californica =

Species of gastropod

Pleurobranchaea californica is a species of gastropods belonging to the family Pleurobranchaeidae.

The species is found in western part of Northern America. Pleurobranchaea californica are voracious, sea slug predators that depend on signal cues sensed from their chemical receptors lined along the anterior edge of their veil for localized feeding and have aposematic learning to avoid animals with noxious defenses.
