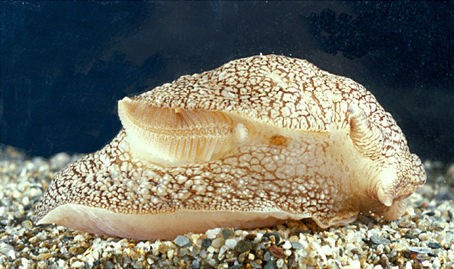
- A lateral view of a live Pleurobranchaea meckeli

Scientific classification
- Kingdom: Animalia
- Phylum: Mollusca
- Class: Gastropoda
- Order: Pleurobranchida
- Family: Pleurobranchaeidae
- Genus: Pleurobranchaea
- Species: P. meckeli

Binomial name
- Pleurobranchaea meckeli (Blainville, 1825)

Synonyms
- Pleurobranchaea chiajei Locard, 1886 (Unjustified emendation of dellechiaii); Pleurobranchaea dellechiaii Vérany, 1846; Pleurobranchaea notmec Ev. Marcus & Gosliner, 1984; Pleurobranchaea vayssierei Ev. Marcus & Gosliner, 1984; Pleurobranchidium meckeli Blainville, 1825 (original combination)

= Pleurobranchaea meckeli =

Species of gastropod

Pleurobranchaea meckeli is a species of sea slug, specifically a side gill slug or notaspideans. It is a marine gastropod mollusc in the family Pleurobranchaeidae.

== Description ==
The body of the Pleurobranchaea meckeli is oval and elongated, with a mantle smaller than its foot. These slugs typically come in beige colors, with brown or generally dark-gray reticulated pattern. White is also occasionally present. A caudal spur extends out its rear body. The length of the body attains 15 centimetres (5.9 in).

The animal has a broad oral veil (or hood) and two cylindrical rhinophores. Its bipinnate gill is exposed on the right side of its body and has around 25-35 pinnules.

== Distribution ==
Pleurobranchaea meckeli occurs in the Mediterranean Sea and in the North Atlantic Ocean off Cape Verde and Portugal. They span from north Spain to south Senegal. They have also been recorded around Madeira, the Canary Islands, and the Azores.

Most prior published records around the Mediterranean were from depths of 8-100 meters (26-328 ft). However, a specimen was also collected from the Sea of Marmara at a depth of 1,000 meters (3,300 ft). Those collected were from sandy-muddy, sapropelic mud seabeds.

== Ecology ==
P. meckeli is described as an opportunistic carnivore. Examination of stomach contents found evidence of scavenging and cannibalism. Cnidarians were the preferred prey throughout the year.

These slugs likely have a two-year life cycle, with benthic recruitment during winter seasons and reproduction during summer and autumn seasons. Individuals appeared to overwinter after reproduction adn may reproduce more than once during their lives.
