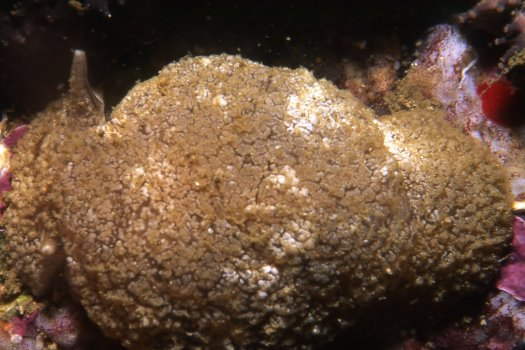
- A close-up of Pleurobranchaea bubula, head towards the left

Scientific classification
- Kingdom: Animalia
- Phylum: Mollusca
- Class: Gastropoda
- Order: Pleurobranchida
- Family: Pleurobranchaeidae
- Genus: Pleurobranchaea
- Species: P. bubala

Binomial name
- Pleurobranchaea bubala Marcus & Gosliner, 1984

= Pleurobranchaea bubala =

Species of gastropod

Pleurobranchaea bubala, the warty pleurobranch, is a species of sea slug, specifically a sidegill slug or notaspidean. It is a marine gastropod mollusc in the family Pleurobranchaeidae.

== Distribution ==
This species is endemic to the South African coast and is found only from Hout Bay to Jeffreys Bay in 5–30 m of water.

== Description ==
The length of the species is on average between 60 mm and 70 mm.

Pleurobranchaea bubala has an oval sandy-coloured body with large opaque white bumps on the notum. It has a spade-shaped head and two widely separated rhinophores. There is a single gill on right hand side of body. It can be confused with Pleurobranchaea tarda, which is smaller, has smoother skin, and can be found in deeper water.

== Distinguishing features ==
he dorsal surface has a honeycomb-like, mottled coloration of brown, black, and yellow. The body is very soft and fleshy with a slimy texture. When submerged, two dorso-laterally positioned rhinophores (chemosensory tentacles) often extend, along with a tube-like mouth. From the ventral view, feather-like gills (branchia) are clearly visible on the right side, along with the foot. The body of Pleurobranchaea is very soft and does not retain its shape well out of water.

== Ecology ==
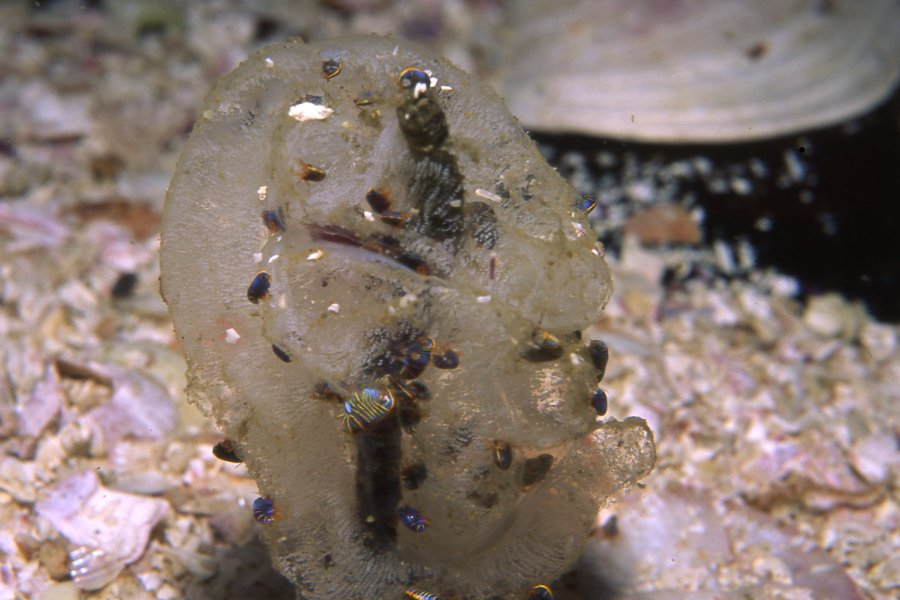
The egg ribbon of the warty pleurobranch being eaten by hunchback amphipods

This pleurobranch is a voracious predator on other opisthobranchs. It has been seen eating smaller individuals of the same species. Its egg ribbon is a sizeable roll of several white loops.
