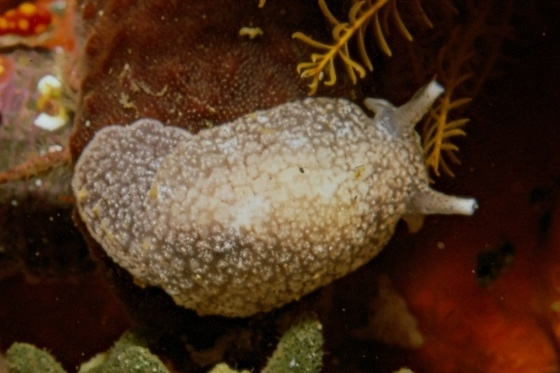

Scientific classification
- Kingdom: Animalia
- Phylum: Mollusca
- Class: Gastropoda
- Order: Pleurobranchida
- Family: Pleurobranchaeidae
- Genus: Pleurobranchaea
- Species: P. tarda

Binomial name
- Pleurobranchaea tarda Verrill, 1880

= Pleurobranchaea tarda =

Species of gastropod

Pleurobranchaea tarda, the dwarf warty pleurobranch, is a species of sea slug, a marine gastropod mollusc in the family Pleurobranchaeidae.

== Distribution ==
This species is found on the Atlantic coast of North America and West Africa, as well as off the South African coast, from the Atlantic coast of the Cape Peninsula to Knysna intertidally to 60 m.

== Description ==
Pleurobranchaea tarda has an oval sandy-coloured body with a spade-shaped head and two widely separated rolled rhinophores. It has a single gill on the right hand side of its body and can grow to be 70 mm long. It may be confused with Pleurobranchaea bubala, which is bigger and has a rougher surface, but tends to live in shallower water.

== Ecology ==
It is an enthusiastic predator on other opisthobranchs; and has even been seen eating smaller individuals of the same species. Its egg ribbon forms a sizeable roll of several white loops.
