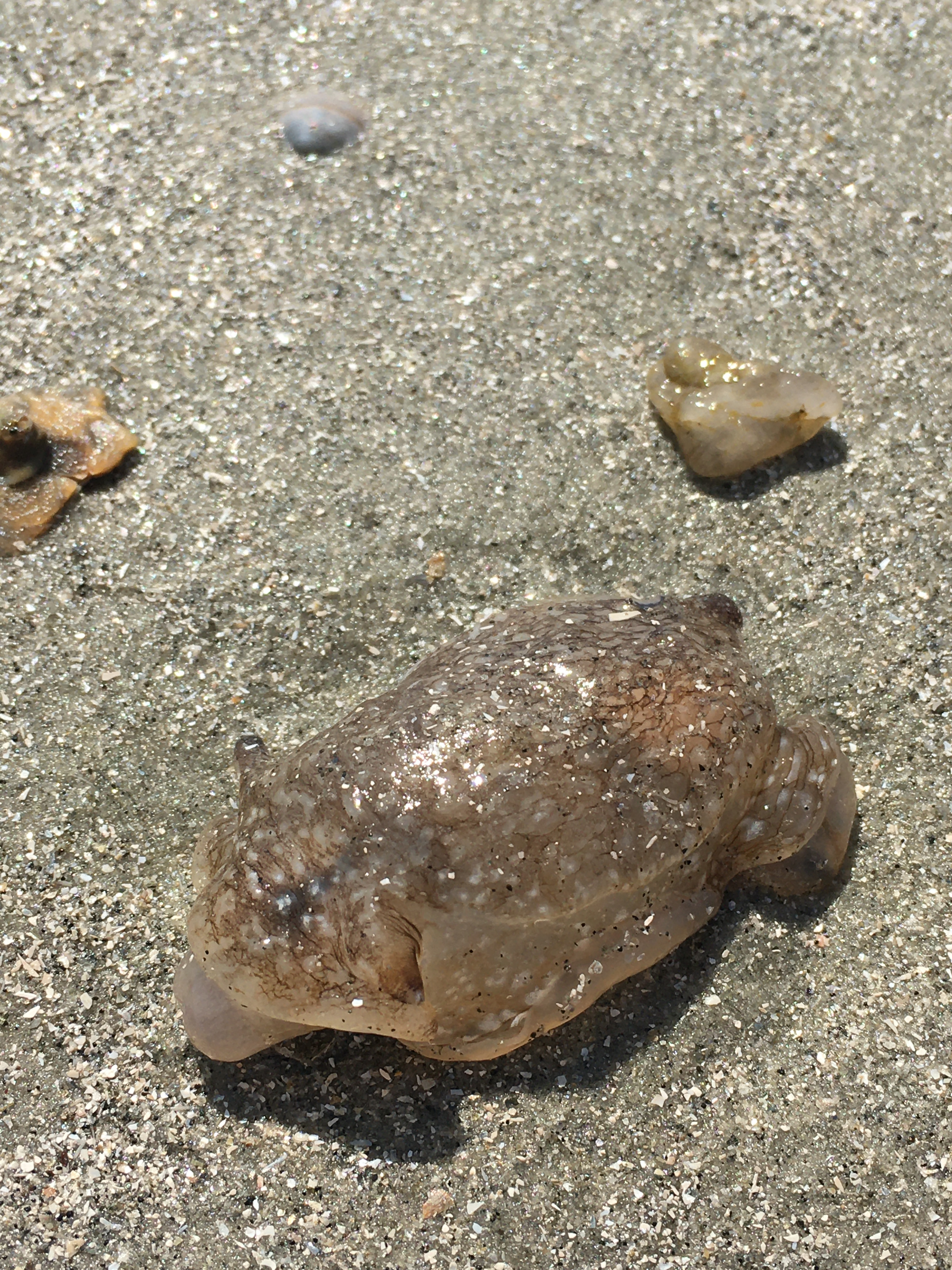
- Beached P. inconspicua on Hilton Head Island, SC

Scientific classification
- Kingdom: Animalia
- Phylum: Mollusca
- Class: Gastropoda
- Order: Pleurobranchida
- Family: Pleurobranchaeidae
- Genus: Pleurobranchaea
- Species: P. inconspicua

Binomial name
- Pleurobranchaea inconspicua Bergh, 1897

= Pleurobranchaea inconspicua =

Species of sea slug

Pleurobranchaea inconspicua is a species of sea slug belonging to the family Pleurobranchaeidae. Organisms within the genus Pleurobranchaea are considered side-gilled slugs and have well-separated rhinophores. P. inconspicua are benthic, with a typical distribution along coastal waters of the west Atlantic between Argentina and North Carolina. Physical characteristics include a translucent, cream white body with a mottled brown coloration and distinct white spots. They are opportunistic carnivores and active hunters, feeding on a variety of small invertebrates.

== Taxonomy ==
Pleurobranchaea inconspicua is a species of marine slug in the genus Pleurobranchaea, a group of notaspideans (side-gilled sea slugs), and family Pleurobranchaeidae. The species was originally named and described by Ludvig Sophus Rudolph Bergh in 1897 and was based off a singular specimen from the northeastern coast of Brazil. Further studies and a re-evaluation of previous literature revealed synonyms for P. inconspicua, which included P. hedgpethi, P. hamva, and P. bonnieae. While P. gela was originally thought to be a synonym, it was later recognized as a valid species.

Historical determination of species within Pleurobranchaea was largely based on the classical hard structures of radula and jaw morphology, but this method is generally insufficient for distinguishing species of Pleurobranchaea due to their high morphological similarities. While using scanning electron microscopy (SEM) to image hard structures is an improvement on old techniques, the most revealing method is an examination of their reproductive system and penile morphology.

== Morphology ==
Pleurobranchaea inconspicua is a medium-large sea slug, growing up to 80mm. It has an elongated ovular form, and its body is a translucent, cream white with a mottled, dark brown pattern featuring prominent white spots. The foot maintains this pattern, but is a lighter brown. Large gills are visible on the dorsolateral side with 20-26 pinnules. Long, separated rhinophores and a caudal spur are present.

== Distribution and habitat ==
This species has a recorded range in the west Atlantic between Cape Hatteras, North Carolina (USA) and San José Gulf (Argentina) and is found at depths up to 150m. It has also been recorded in the Mediterranean Sea and coast of west Africa. They are benthic organisms and prefer soft substrates.

== Diet ==
Pleurobranchaea inconspicua are opportunistic carnivores and, like all Pleurobranchaea spp., active hunters, feeding on a variety of small invertebrates. Their diet includes sponges, anemones, annelids, and other mollusks.

== Reproduction ==
Pleurobranchaea inconspicua are simultaneous hermaphrodites, containing both male and female reproductive parts. While the reproductive biology of P. inconspicua has not been independently studied, simultaneous gamete maturation and obligate cross-fertilization with copulation are shared traits of the clade Nudipleura.
