= Tochuina nigritigris =

Scientific classification
- Kingdom: Animalia
- Phylum: Mollusca
- Class: Gastropoda
- Order: Nudibranchia
- Suborder: Tritoniacea
- Family: Tritoniidae
- Genus: Tochuina
- Species: T. nigritigris

Binomial name
- Tochuina nigritigris (Valdés, Lundsten & N. G. Wilson, 2018)

Synonyms
- Tritonia nigritigris Á. Valdés, Lundsten & N. G. Wilson, 2018

Species of gastropod

Tochuina nigritigris is a species of dendronotid nudibranch, in the family Tritoniidae, that is 82 mm long.

== Description ==
Scientists named the species nigritigris, a combination of the words "black" and "tiger" in Latin, because of its dark and light stripes. The body of the nudibranch is elongated and narrow, surrounded by numerous, densely packed glandular projections that makes them look ruffled. Tochuina nigritigris has short and white rhinophores with 9 simple lamellae, located on the anterior end of the notum. The genital and anal openings are on the right side of the body.

== Distribution ==
Tochuina nigritigris was discovered by the MBARI on Guide Seamount, an underwater mountain off the coast of Central California, where it was found crawling on volcanic rocks 1,730 meters below the surface, near some dead clumps of coral. Other animals observed near it included Keratoisis, comatulid crinoids, hyocrinid crinoids, primnoid octocorals, sea stars, bivalves, Farrea, and many members of Macrouridae. The phylogenetic position was initially based on available sequence data and phylogenetic analysis which indicated that it was the sister to the Antarctic species Tritonella belli. A fuller analysis of the phylogeny of the Tritoniidae in 2020 moved this species to Tochuina.
