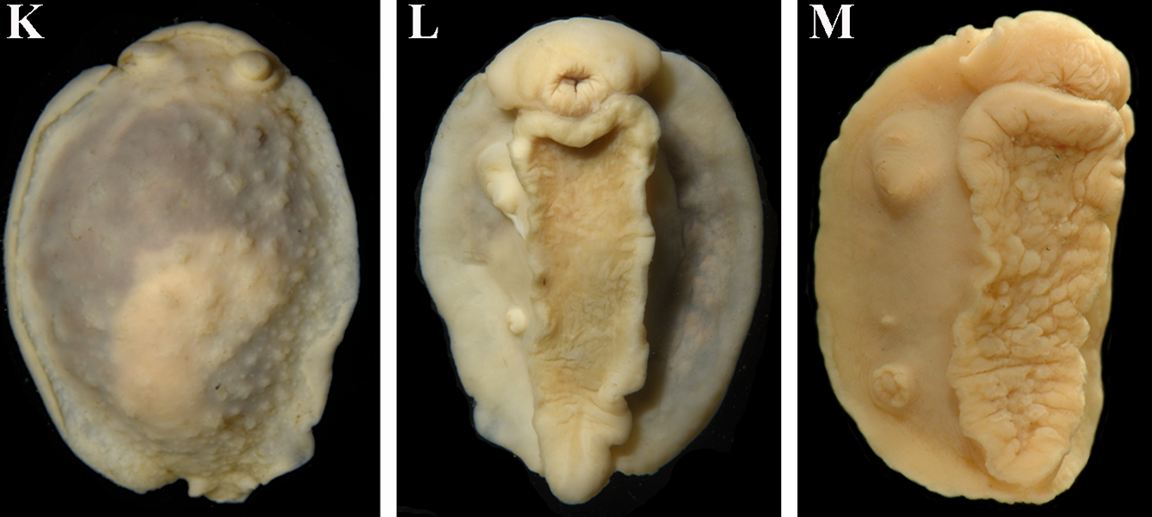
- Preserved specimens of Doridoxa walteri in dorsal (K), ventral (L), and lateroventral (M) view
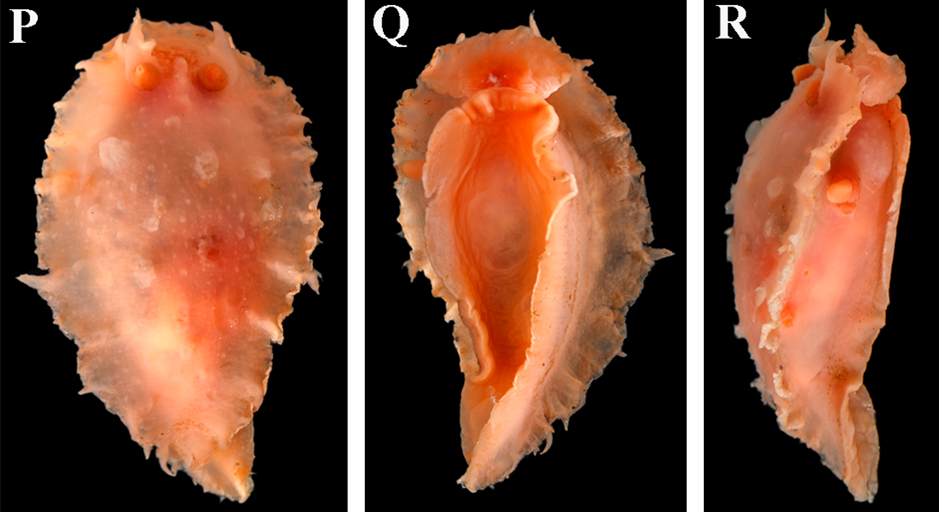
- Live specimens of Heterodoris robusta in dorsal (P), ventral (Q) and lateral (R) views

Scientific classification
- Kingdom: Animalia
- Phylum: Mollusca
- Class: Gastropoda
- Order: Nudibranchia
- Suborder: Arminacea
- Superfamily: Doridoxoidea; Bergh, 1899

Families
- See text

= Doridoxoidea =

Superfamily of gastropods

Doridoxoidea is a superfamily of nudibranchs, shell-less marine gastropod molluscs or sea slugs, in the suborder Arminacea.

== Classification ==
The following families are recognised in the superfamily Doridoxoidea:

- Family Doridomorphidae Er. Marcus & Ev. Marcus, 1960
- Family Doridoxidae Bergh, 1899
- Family Heterodorididae Verrill & Emerton, 1882

A 2020 molecular analysis by Korshunova and Martynov recovered the following phylogenetic tree, where Doridomorpha, Doridoxa, and Heterodoris form a clade sister to the family Arminidae:

- - Dendronotoidea
  - - Tritoniidae
    - - Arminidae
        - Armina
        - Dermatobranchus
      - - Doridoxidae
          Doridoxa
        - - Doridomorphidae
            Doridomorpha
          - Heterodorididae
            Heterodoris
