= Quijote cervantesi =

Scientific classification
- Domain: Eukaryota
- Kingdom: Animalia
- Phylum: Mollusca
- Class: Gastropoda
- Order: Pleurobranchida
- Family: Quijotidae; Ortea, Moro & Bacallado, 2016
- Genus: Quijote; Ortea, Moro & Bacallado, 2016
- Species: Q. cervantesi

Binomial name
- Quijote cervantesi Ortea, Moro & Bacallado, 2016

Genus of gastropods

Quijote is a monotypic genus of gastropods belonging to the monotypic family Quijotidae. The only species is Quijote cervantesi.
