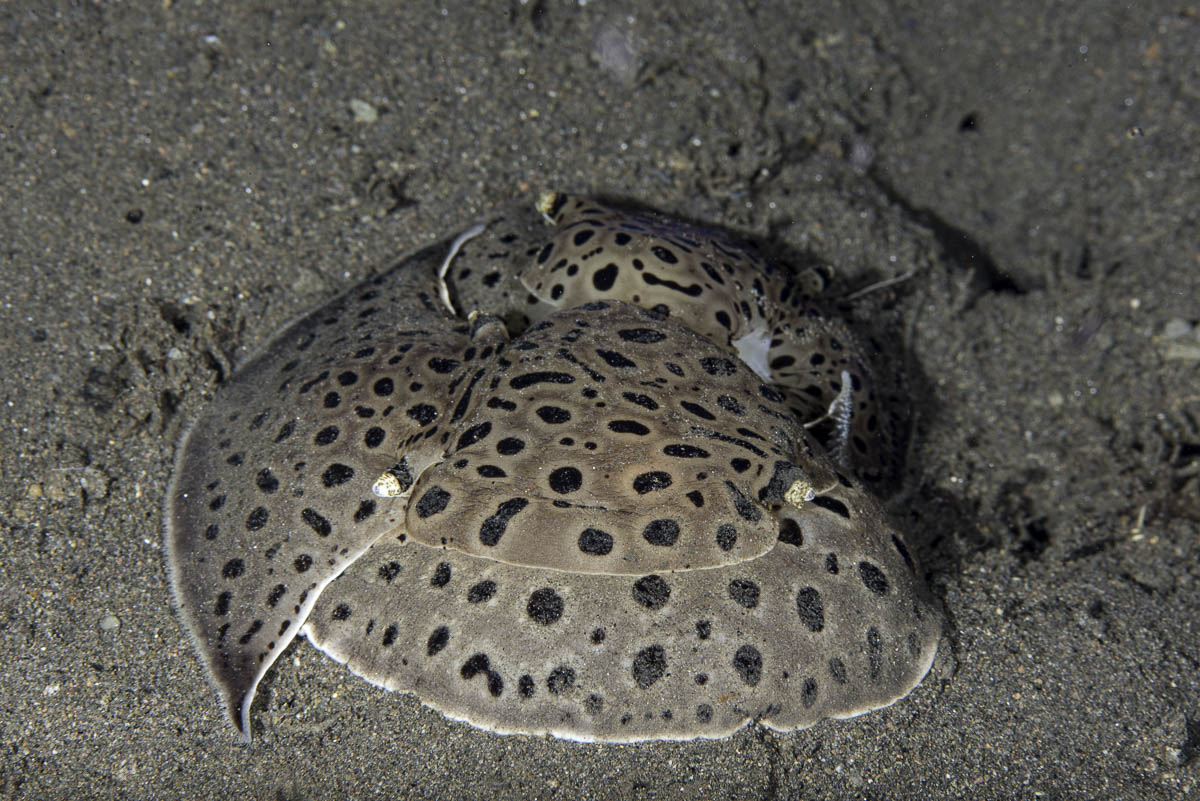
- A mating pair of Euselenops luniceps

Scientific classification
- Kingdom: Animalia
- Phylum: Mollusca
- Class: Gastropoda
- Order: Pleurobranchida
- Superfamily: Pleurobranchoidea
- Family: Pleurobranchaeidae; Pilsbry, 1896

Type genus
- Pleurobranchaea Leue, 1813

Genera
- See text

= Pleurobranchaeidae =

Family of gastropods

The Pleurobranchaeidae are a taxonomic family of sea slugs, marine gastropod molluscs, in the clade Pleurobranchomorpha.

== Taxonomy ==
The following genera and respective species are recognised in the family Pleurobranchaeidae:

- Euselenops Pilsbry, 1896
  - Euselenops luniceps (Cuvier, 1816)
  - Euselenops winckworthi Satyamurti, 1946
- Pleurobranchaea Leue, 1813
  - Pleurobranchaea agassizii Bergh, 1897
  - Pleurobranchaea augusta Ev. Marcus & Gosliner, 1984
  - Pleurobranchaea britannica Turani, Carmona, Barry, Close, Bullimore & Cervera, 2024
  - Pleurobranchaea brockii Bergh, 1897
  - Pleurobranchaea bubala Ev. Marcus & Gosliner, 1984
  - Pleurobranchaea californica MacFarland, 1966
  - Pleurobranchaea catherinae Dayrat, 2001
  - Pleurobranchaea gela Ev. Marcus & Er. Marcus, 1966
  - Pleurobranchaea inconspicua Bergh, 1897
  - Pleurobranchaea japonica Thiele, 1925
  - Pleurobranchaea maculata (Quoy & Gaimard, 1832)
  - Pleurobranchaea meckeli (Blainville, 1825)
  - Pleurobranchaea morosa (Bergh, 1892)
  - Pleurobranchaea obesa (A. E. Verrill, 1882)
  - Pleurobranchaea spiroporphyra Alvim, Simone & Pimenta, 2014
  - Pleurobranchaea tarda A. E. Verrill, 1880
- Pleurobranchella Thiele, 1925
  - Pleurobranchella nicobarica Thiele, 1925
