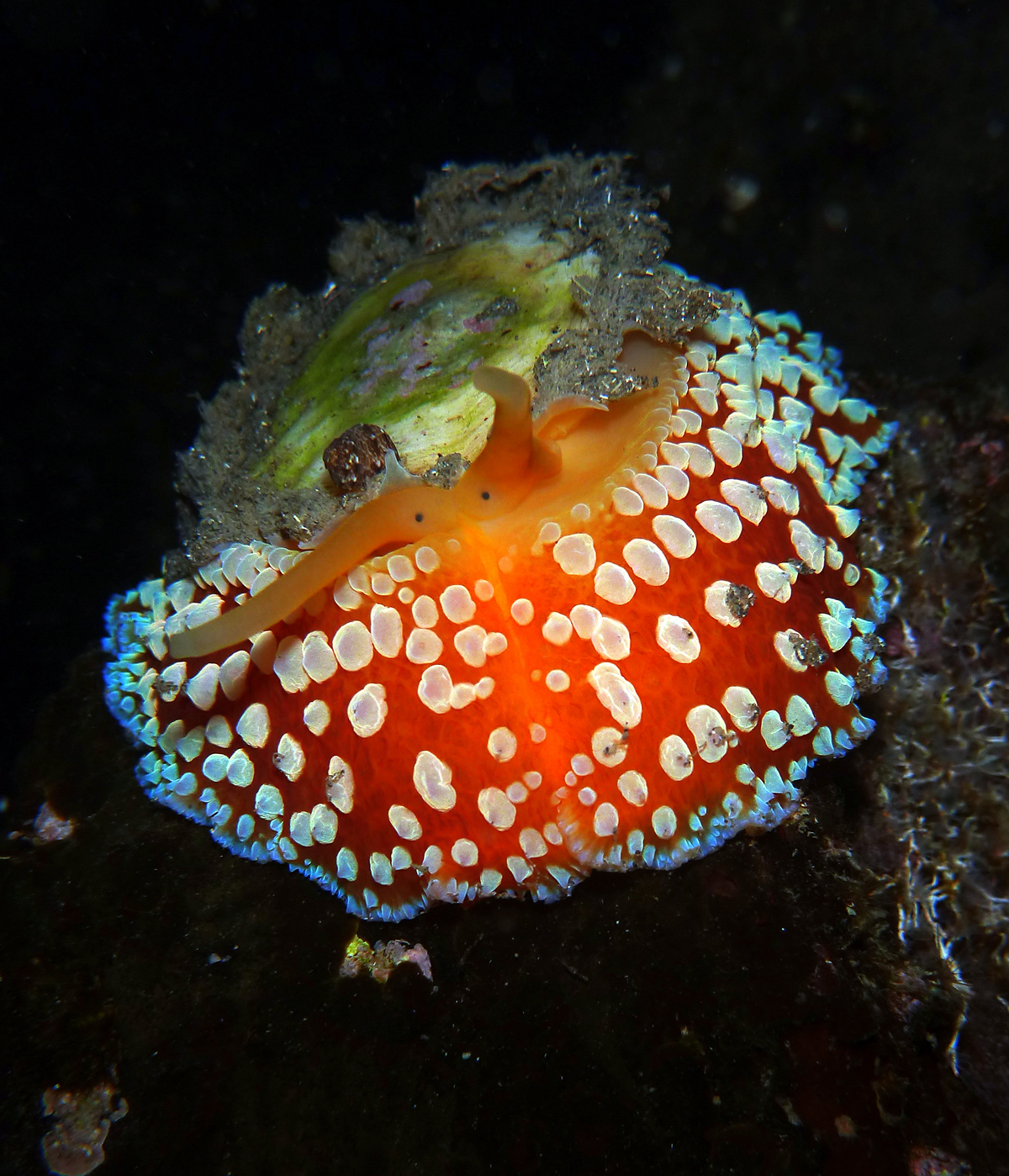
- Umbraculum umbraculum showing rhinophores and eyes

Scientific classification
- Kingdom: Animalia
- Phylum: Mollusca
- Class: Gastropoda
- Clade: Euopisthobranchia
- Family: Umbraculidae
- Genus: Umbraculum
- Species: U. umbraculum

Binomial name
- Umbraculum umbraculum (Lightfoot, 1786)

Synonyms
- List: Patella ombracula Blainville, 1819; Umbraculum bermudense (Mörch, 1875); Umbraculum botanicum Hedley, 1923; Umbraculum indicum (Lamarck, 1819); Umbraculum mediterraneum (Lamarck, 1819); Umbraculum ovalis (Carpenter, 1856); Umbraculum plicatulum (Martens, 1881); Umbraculum pulchrum Lin, 1981; Umbraculum sinicum (Gmelin, 1791); Umbrella indica Lamarck, 1819; Umbrella mediterranea Lamarck, 1819

= Umbraculum umbraculum =

Species of gastropod

Umbraculum umbraculum, common name the umbrella slug, is a species of large sea snail or limpet, a marine gastropod mollusc in the family Umbraculidae. It is found in tropical to warm temperate parts of the Indo-Pacific and Atlantic Oceans, where it feeds on sponges.

== Description ==
Umbraculum umbraculum is a large mollusc growing to a length of up to 20 cm (8 in), with a relatively small external shell on the dorsal surface. This shell is a flattish cone and is usually encrusted with epiphytic organisms, both plant and animal. The mantle is roughly circular in outline, and is covered with pustules; the ground colour of the mantle varies, usually being orange or brownish, and the pustules are usually white. The mollusc does not elongate when crawling and the location of the head is revealed when it thrusts out its rolled rhinophores from beneath the shell. At the base of the rhinophores are a pair of eyes, and beneath is a cleft which contains the mouth. The radula is broad and is armed with many small teeth. The sole of the foot is smooth and flat; the gills are bipinnate and are located in the right side of the body. It has roughly 10,000 teeth in its mouth at any one time and will go through approximately 750,000 teeth during its lifetime of up to ten years.

== Distribution and habitat ==
Umbraculum umbraculum is found in the Pacific Ocean in both the tropics and in warm temperate regions. Its range includes Indonesia, Australia, New Zealand, Hawaii, Mexico, and Panama. It also occurs in the Red Sea, the Mediterranean Sea and the warmer parts of the Atlantic Ocean. In 2016, researchers reported that it had been observed for the first time in the Bay of Biscay in surveys undertaken between 2011 and 2014, in what seemed to be a northward shift in its range; this "tropicalisation" was attributed to a rise in sea temperature. It occurs in both shallow water and at depths down to about 275 m (900 ft).

== Ecology ==
Umbraculum umbraculum feeds on sponges and its colouring often makes it well camouflaged. It rasps the surface of the sponge with its radula, opening the cleft on its base wide so that it can press its mouth against the surface of the sponge. This slug has been found on Tethya spp., Aaptos aaptos, Ancorina alata and Plakina trilopha. The eggs are laid in a long, coiled ribbon and the larvae are planktonic.

== Gallery ==
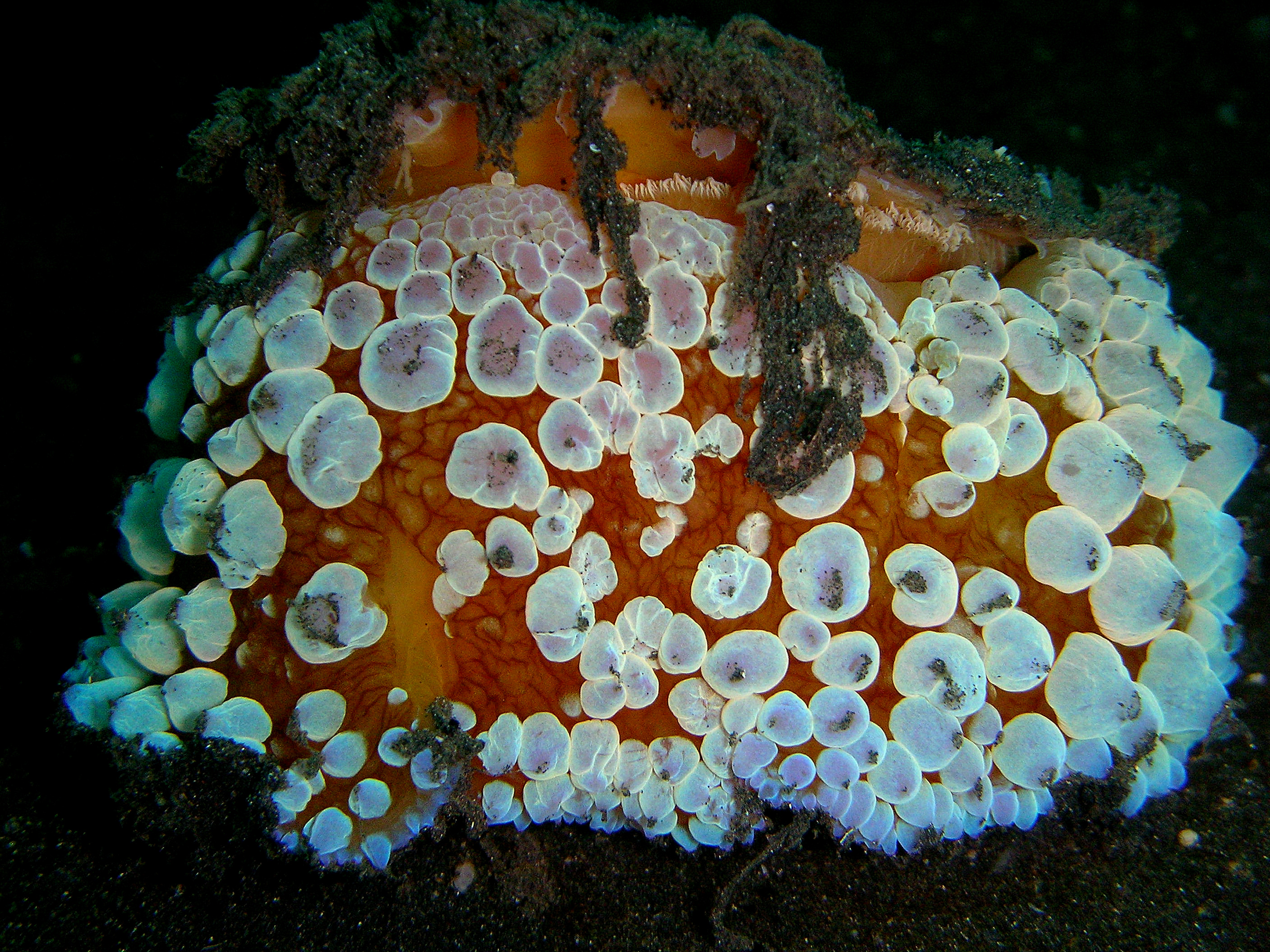

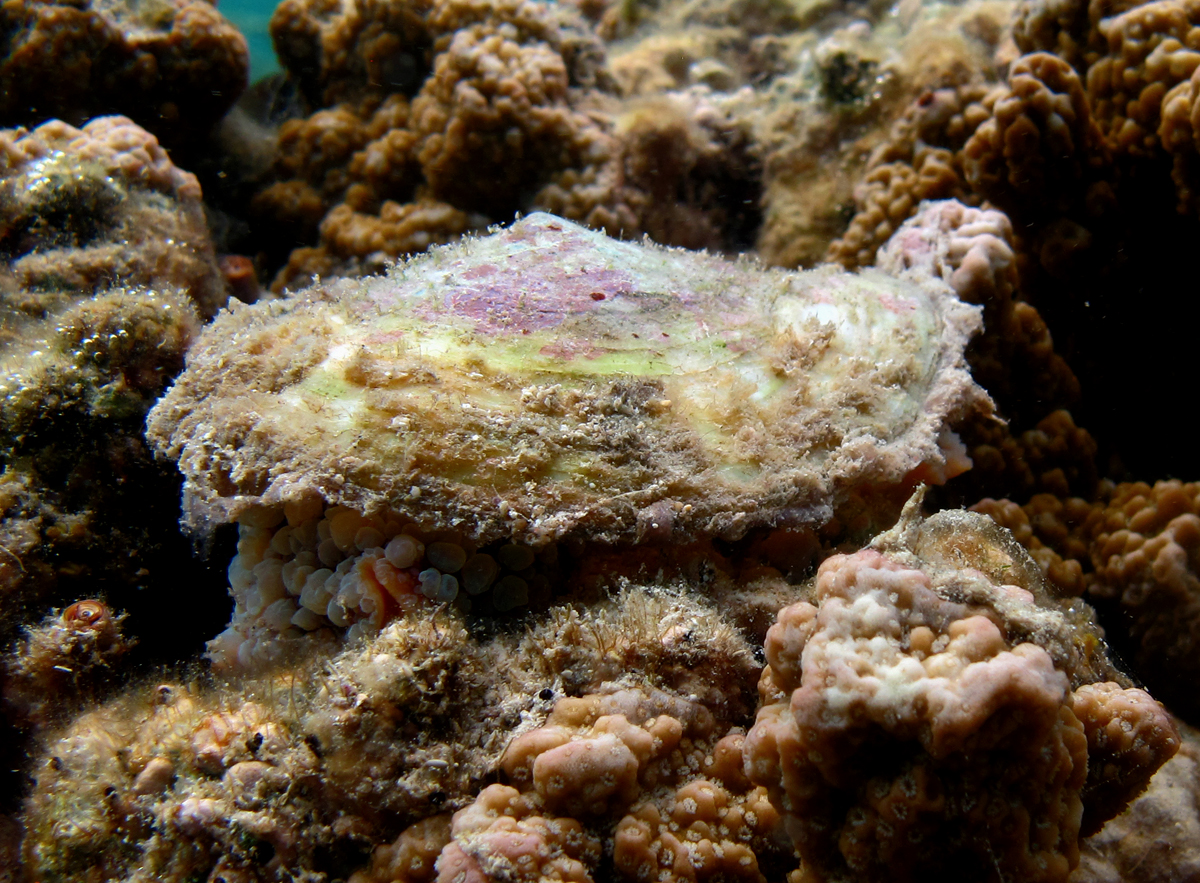

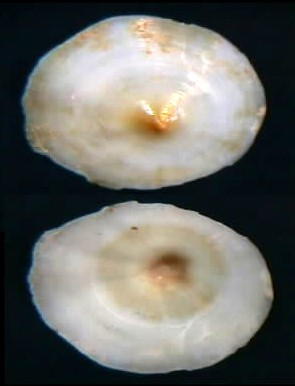

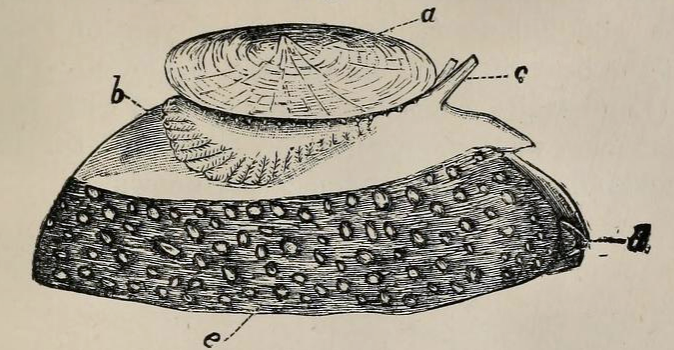

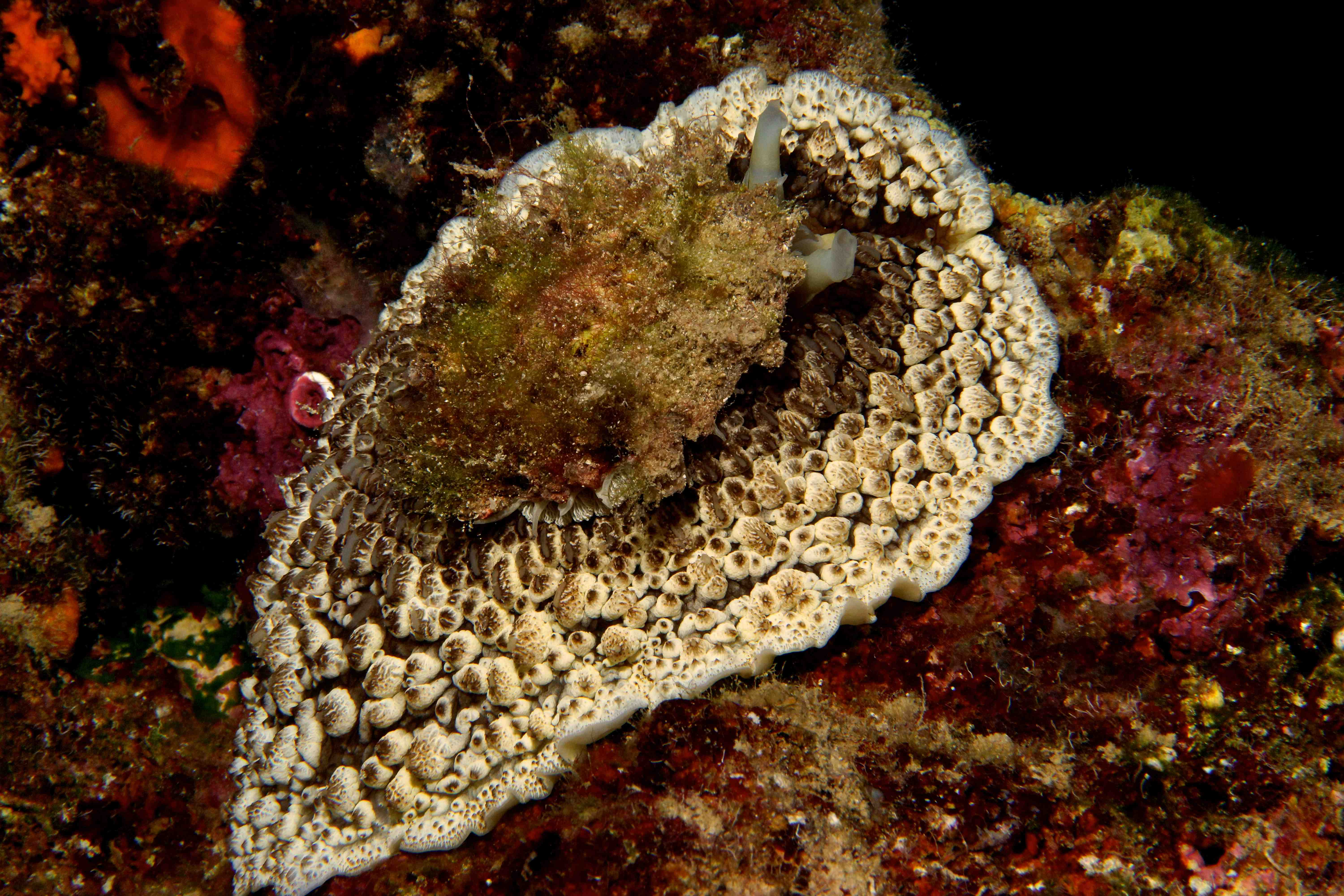
