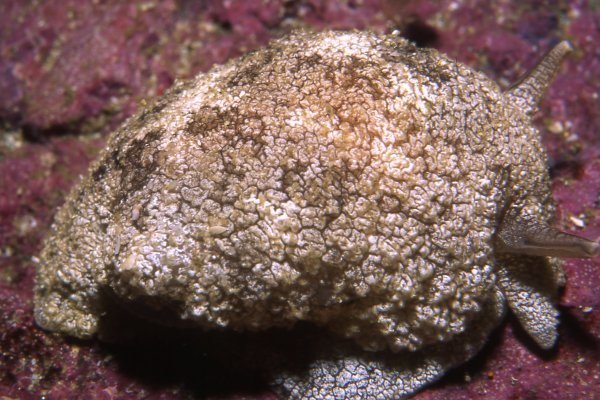
- Pleurobranchaea bubala

Scientific classification
- Kingdom: Animalia
- Phylum: Mollusca
- Class: Gastropoda
- Order: Pleurobranchida
- Family: Pleurobranchaeidae
- Genus: Pleurobranchaea

Synonyms
- Koonsia Verrill, 1882; Macfarlandaea Ev. Marcus & Gosliner, 1984; Pleurobranchidium Leue, 1813; Pleurobranchillus Bergh, 1892

= Pleurobranchaea =

Genus of molluscs

Pleurobranchaea is a genus of sea slugs, specifically sidegill slugs or notaspideans. These are marine gastropod molluscs in the family Pleurobranchaeidae. The genus is differentiated from other sidegill slugs by its rhinophores, which are well separated, rather than being joined under the notum. This genus has recently been coined sea owls which is the common name in Japanese for Pleurobranchaea japonica.

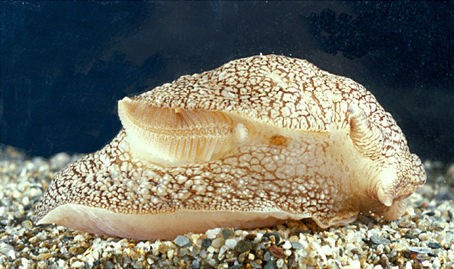
Pleurobranchaea meckelii

== Species ==
Species in the genus Pleurobranchaea include:

- Pleurobranchaea agassizii R. Bergh, 1897
- Pleurobranchaea augusta Ev. Marcus & Gosliner, 1984
- Pleurobranchaea britannica Turani, Carmona, Barry, Close, Bullimore & Cervera, 2024
- Pleurobranchaea brockii Bergh, 1897
- Pleurobranchaea bubala Marcus and Gosliner, 1984
- Pleurobranchaea californica MacFarland, 1966
- Pleurobranchaea catherinae Dayrat, 2001
- Pleurobranchaea gela Er. Marcus & Ev. Marcus, 1966
- Pleurobranchaea inconspicua Bergh, 1897
- Pleurobranchaea japonica J. Thiele, 1925
- Pleurobranchaea maculata (Quoy and Gaimard, 1832)
- Pleurobranchaea meckeli (Blainville, 1825)
- Pleurobranchaea morosa (Bergh, 1892)
- Pleurobranchaea obesa (A. E. Verrill, 1882)
- Pleurobranchaea spiroporphyra Alvim, Simone & Pimenta, 2014
- Pleurobranchaea tarda A. E. Verrill, 1880

Species brought into synonymy

- Pleurobranchaea bonnieae Ev. Marcus and Gosliner, 1984 : synonym of Pleurobranchaea inconspicua Bergh, 1897
- Pleurobranchaea chiajei Locard, 1886: synonym of Pleurobranchaea meckeli (Blainville, 1825)
- Pleurobranchaea confusa Ev. Marcus & Gosliner, 1984: synonym of Pleurobranchaea obesa (A. E. Verrill, 1882)
- Pleurobranchaea dellechiaii Vérany, 1846: synonym of Pleurobranchaea meckeli (Blainville, 1825)
- Pleurobranchaea gemini Macnae, 1962: synonym of Pleurobranchaea brockii Bergh, 1897
- Pleurobranchaea hamva Er. Marcus & Ev. Marcus, 1955: synonym of Pleurobranchaea inconspicua Bergh, 1897
- Pleurobranchaea hedgpethi Abbott, 1952: synonym of Pleurobranchaea inconspicua Bergh, 1897
- Pleurobranchaea notmec Ev. Marcus & Gosliner, 1984: synonym of Pleurobranchaea meckeli (Blainville, 1825)
- Pleurobranchaea novaezealandiae Cheeseman, 1878: synonym of Pleurobranchaea maculata (Quoy & Gaimard, 1832)
- Pleurobranchaea vayssierei Ev. Marcus & Gosliner, 1984: synonym of Pleurobranchaea meckeli (Blainville, 1825)
