= Tochuina nigromaculata =

Scientific classification
- Kingdom: Animalia
- Phylum: Mollusca
- Class: Gastropoda
- Order: Nudibranchia
- Suborder: Tritoniacea
- Family: Tritoniidae
- Genus: Tochuina
- Species: T. nigromaculata

Binomial name
- Tochuina nigromaculata (Roginskaya, 1984)

Synonyms
- Tritonia nigromaculata Roginskaya, 1984

Species of gastropod

Tochuina nigromaculata is a species of dendronotid nudibranch. It is a marine gastropod mollusc in the family Tritoniidae.

== Taxonomy ==
Originally described as a Tritonia this species was moved to the revised genus, Tochuina, in 2020 as a result of an integrative study of the family Tritoniidae.

== Distribution ==
Tochuina nigromaculata was described from the Okhotsk Sea. It is a deep water species.
