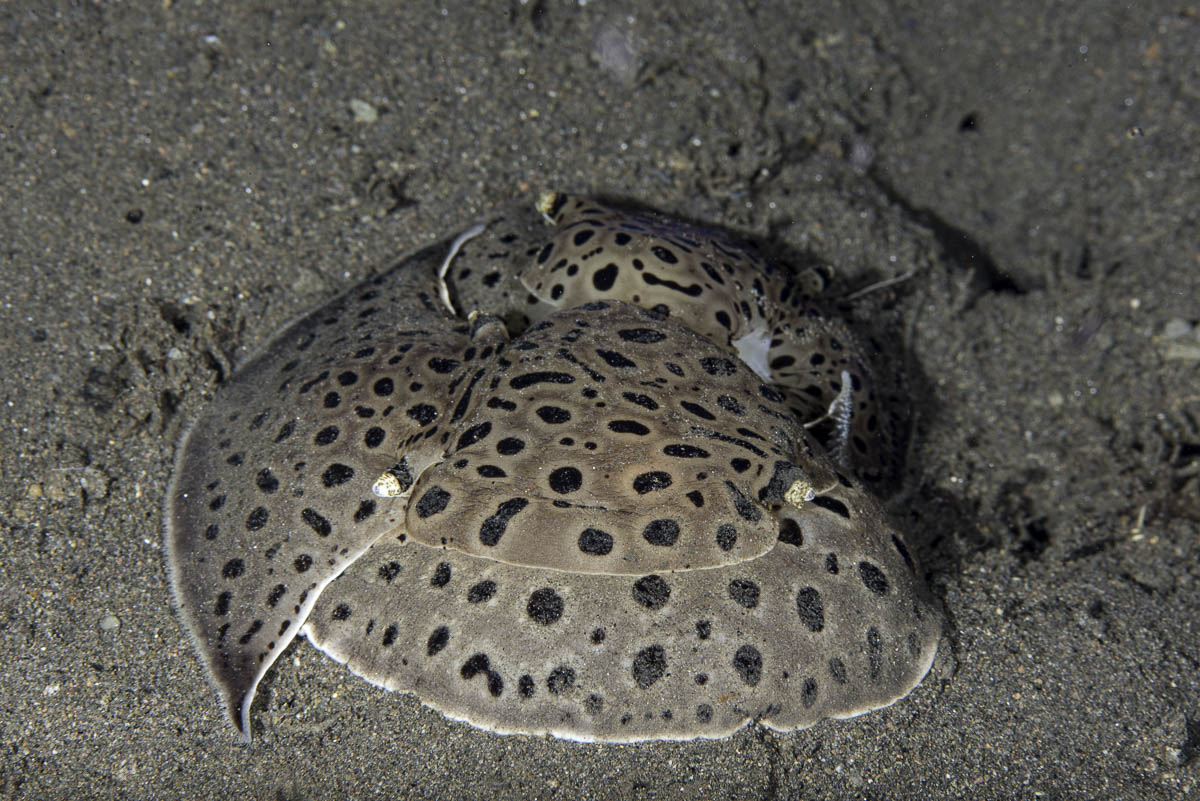
- A mating pair of Euselenops luniceps, Bontoh, Sangeang, Indonesia.

Scientific classification
- Domain: Eukaryota
- Kingdom: Animalia
- Phylum: Mollusca
- Class: Gastropoda
- Order: Pleurobranchomorpha
- Genus: Euselenops; Pilsbry, 1896
- Species: E. luniceps

Binomial name
- Euselenops luniceps (Cuvier, 1817)

Synonyms
- Neda H. Adams & A. Adams, 1854; Oscaniopsis amboinei Vayssière, 1898; Oscaniopsis compta Bergh, 1897; Oscaniopsis semperi Bergh, 1897; Pleurobranchus luniceps Cuvier, 1817 (original combination)

= Euselenops luniceps =

Species of gastropod

Euselenops luniceps is a species of sea slug, a pleurobranchomorph gastropod mollusc in the family Pleurobranchaeidae.

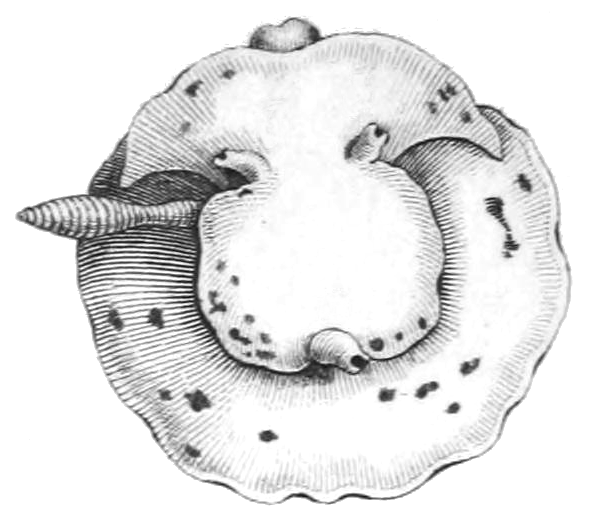
Drawing of dorsal view of Euselenops luniceps

Euselenops luniceps is the type species of the genus Euselenops and Euselenops luniceps is the only species in the genus Euselenops.

The radula of this species was studied by Thompson & Bebbington (1973), but they did not publish a description or an image of it.

== Distribution ==
This species is widespread in the Indo-West Pacific region.
