= Pleurobranchella =

Scientific classification
- Kingdom: Animalia
- Phylum: Mollusca
- Class: Gastropoda
- Order: Pleurobranchida
- Family: Pleurobranchaeidae
- Genus: Pleurobranchella; Thiele, 1925

Type species
- Pleurobranchella nicobarica Thiele, 1925

Synonyms
- Gigantonotum Lin & Tchang, 1965; Pleurobranchoides O'Donoghue, 1929

Genus of gastropods

Pleurobranchella is a genus of sea slugs, marine gastropod mollusks in the family Pleurobranchaeidae.

== Species ==
Species within the genus Pleurobranchella include:

- Pleurobranchella nicobarica Thiele, 1925

Species brought into synonymy

- Pleurobranchella alba (Lin & Tchang, 1965): synonym of Pleurobranchella nicobarica Thiele, 1925
- Pleurobranchella gilchristi (O'Donoghue, 1929): synonym of Pleurobranchella nicobarica Thiele, 1925
