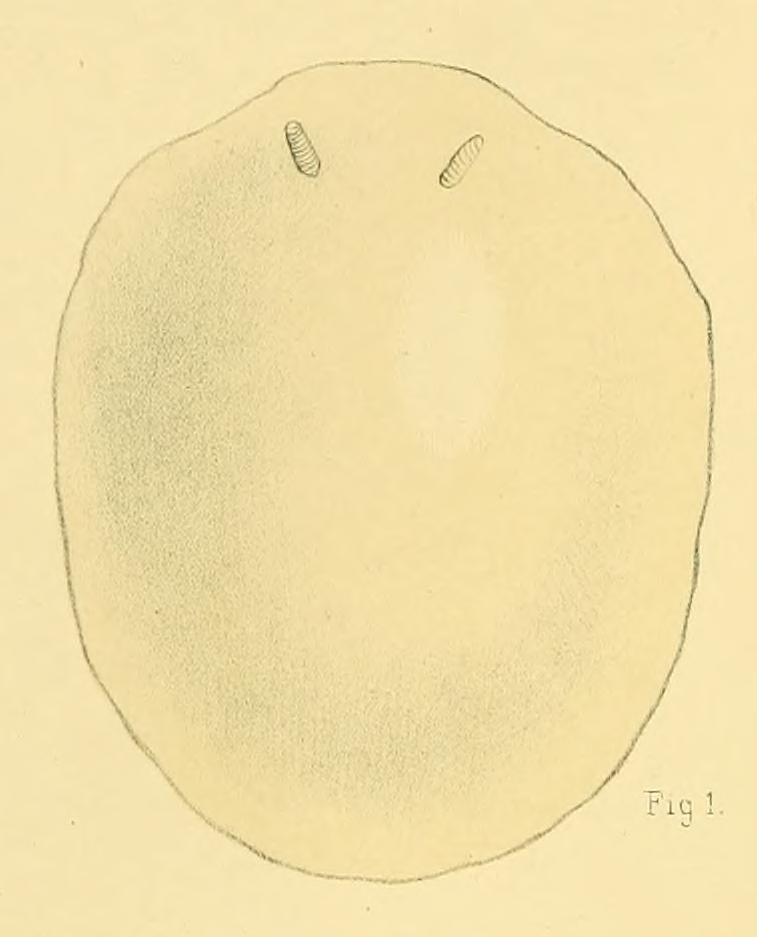
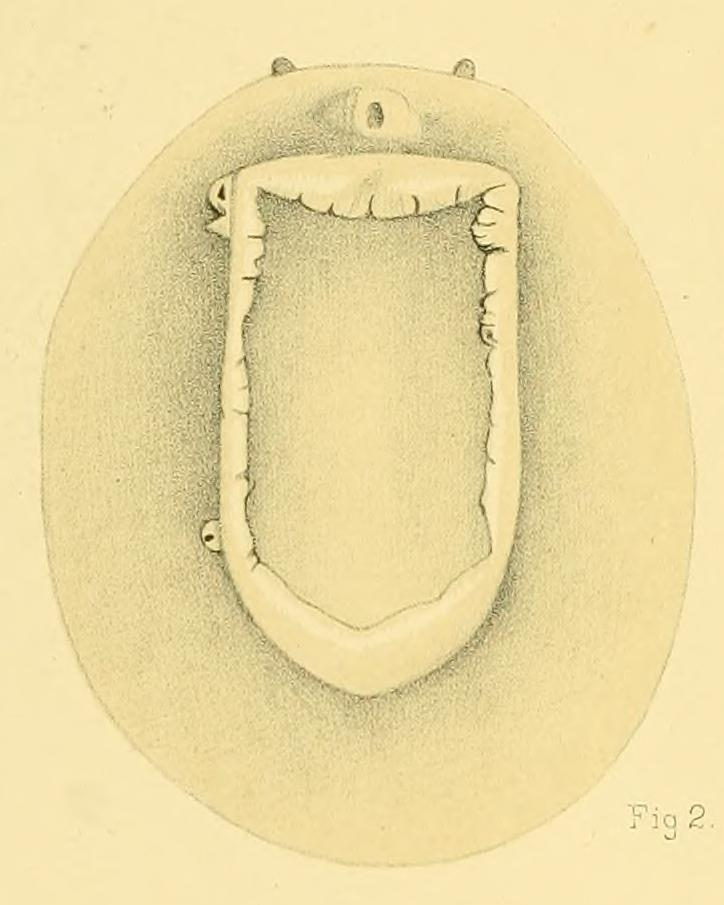
- Doridomorpha gardineri in dorsal (left) and ventral view (right)

Scientific classification
- Kingdom: Animalia
- Phylum: Mollusca
- Class: Gastropoda
- Order: Nudibranchia
- Suborder: Arminacea
- Superfamily: Doridoxoidea
- Family: Doridomorphidae; Er. Marcus & Ev. Marcus, 1960
- Genus: Doridomorpha; Eliot, 1903
- Species: D. gardineri

Binomial name
- Doridomorpha gardineri Eliot, 1903

Synonyms
- Family synonymy: Doridoeididae Eliot & T. J. Evans, 1908; Genus synonymy: Doridoeides Eliot & T. J. Evans, 1908; Species synonymy: Doridoeides gardineri (Eliot, 1903)

= Doridomorpha =

Genus of gastropods

Doridomorpha is a genus of nudibranchs, shell-less marine gastropod molluscs or sea slugs. It is the only member of the family Doridomorphidae in the superfamily Doridoxoidea. It is a monotypic genus, represented by the single species Doridomorpha gardineri. It can occasionally be found on the coral Heliopora.

== Taxonomy ==
The phylogenetic position of Doridomorpha was clarified in 2020 as a result of an integrative taxonomic study of the family Tritoniidae and its close relatives, which recovered a clustering of Doridomorpha, Doridoxa, and Heterodoris, with this group closely related to the family Arminidae.
