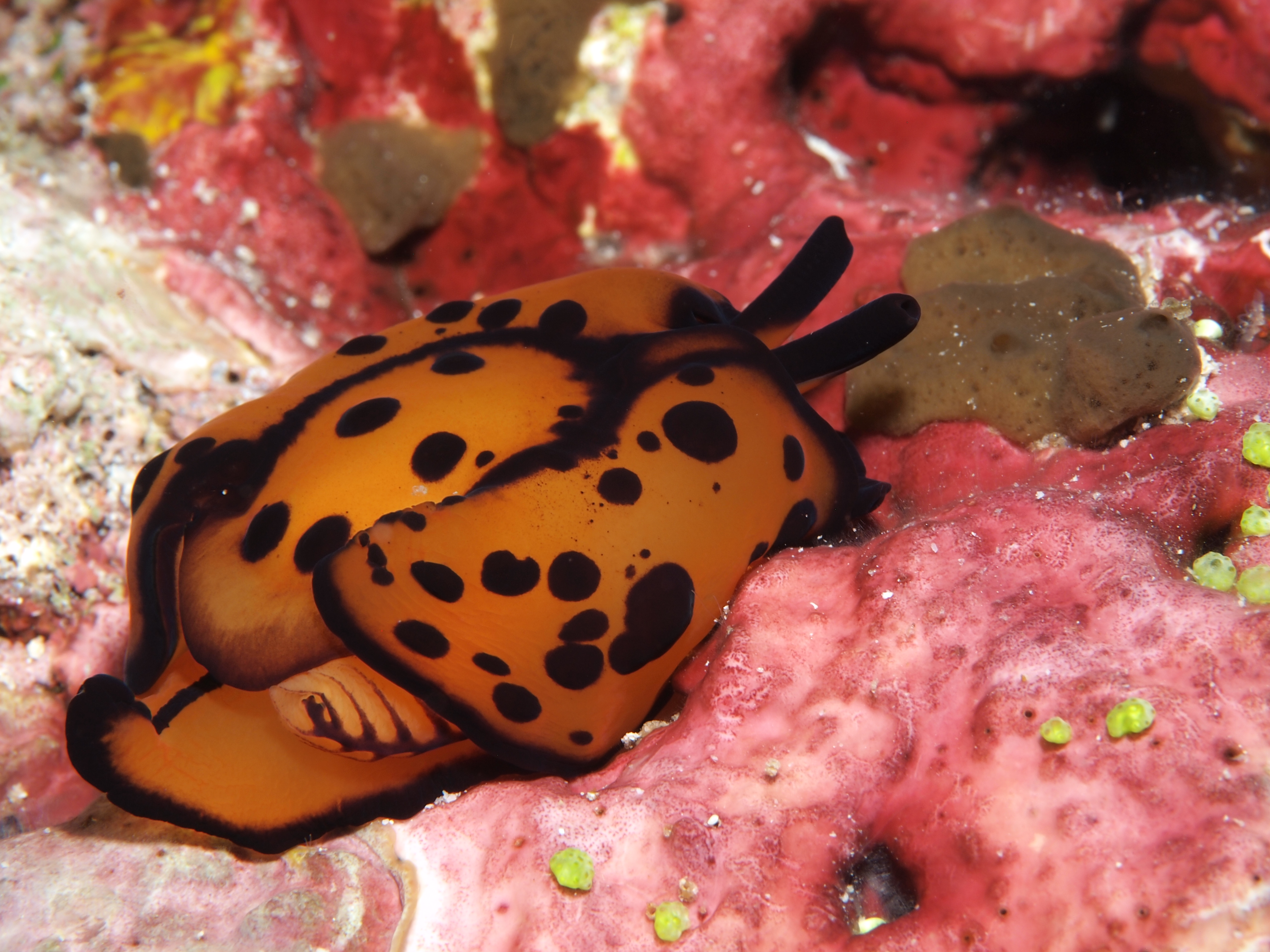
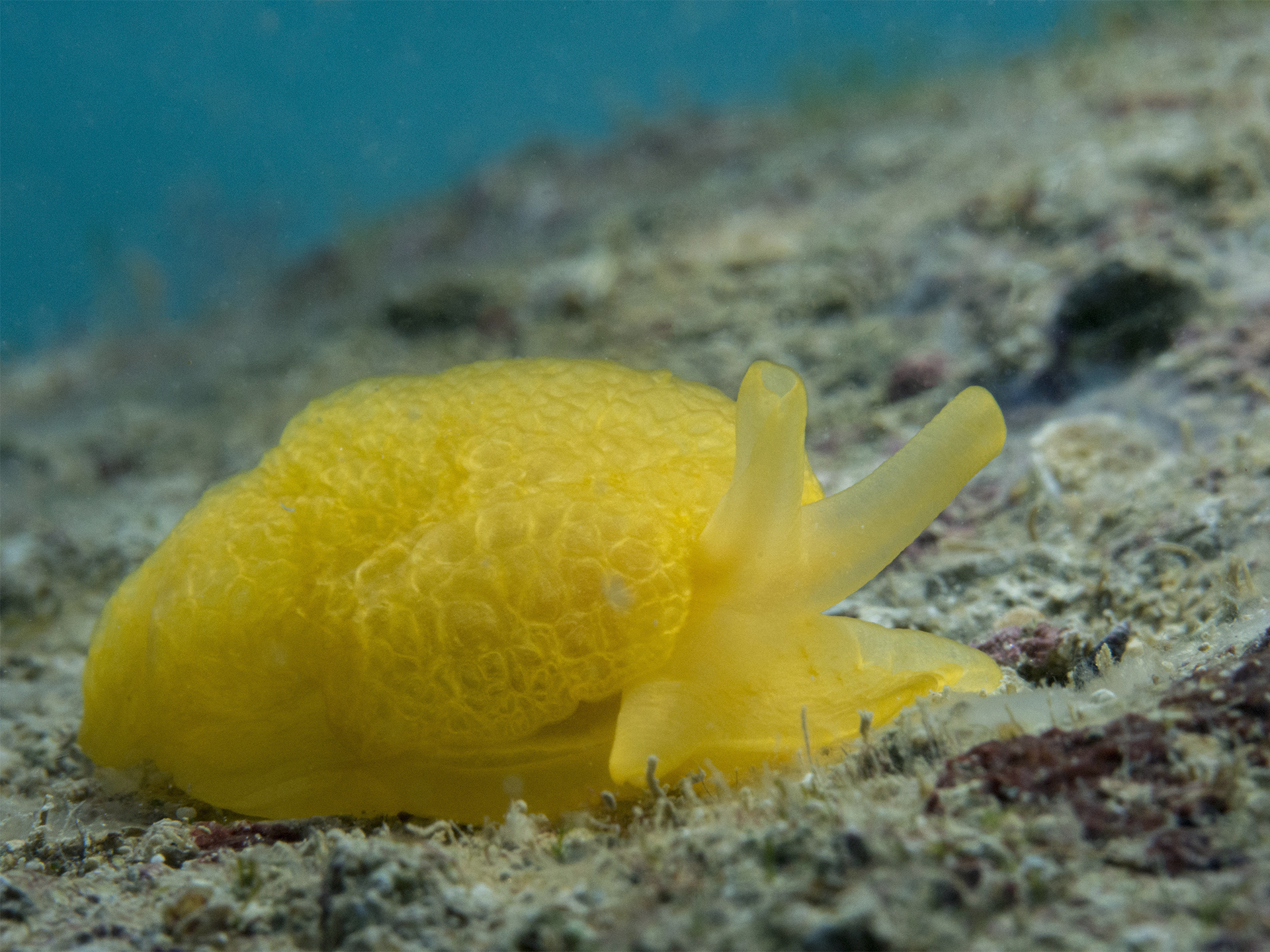
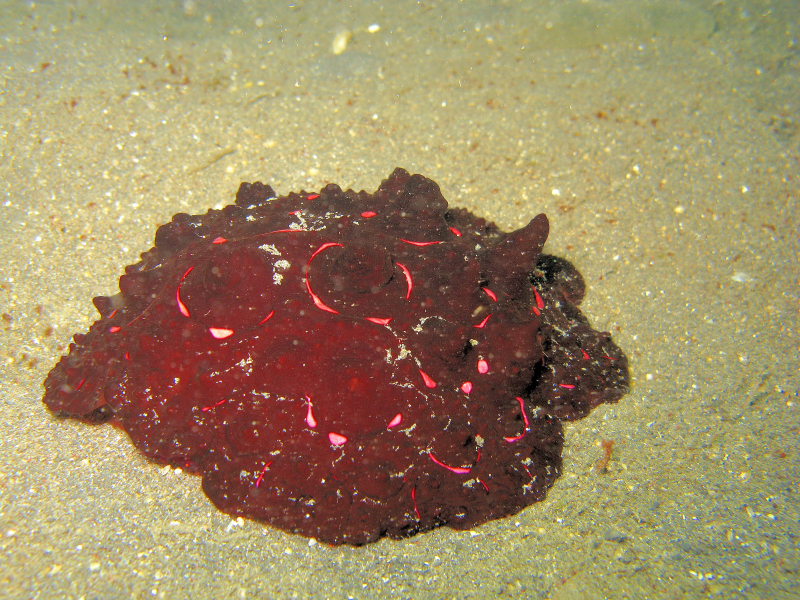
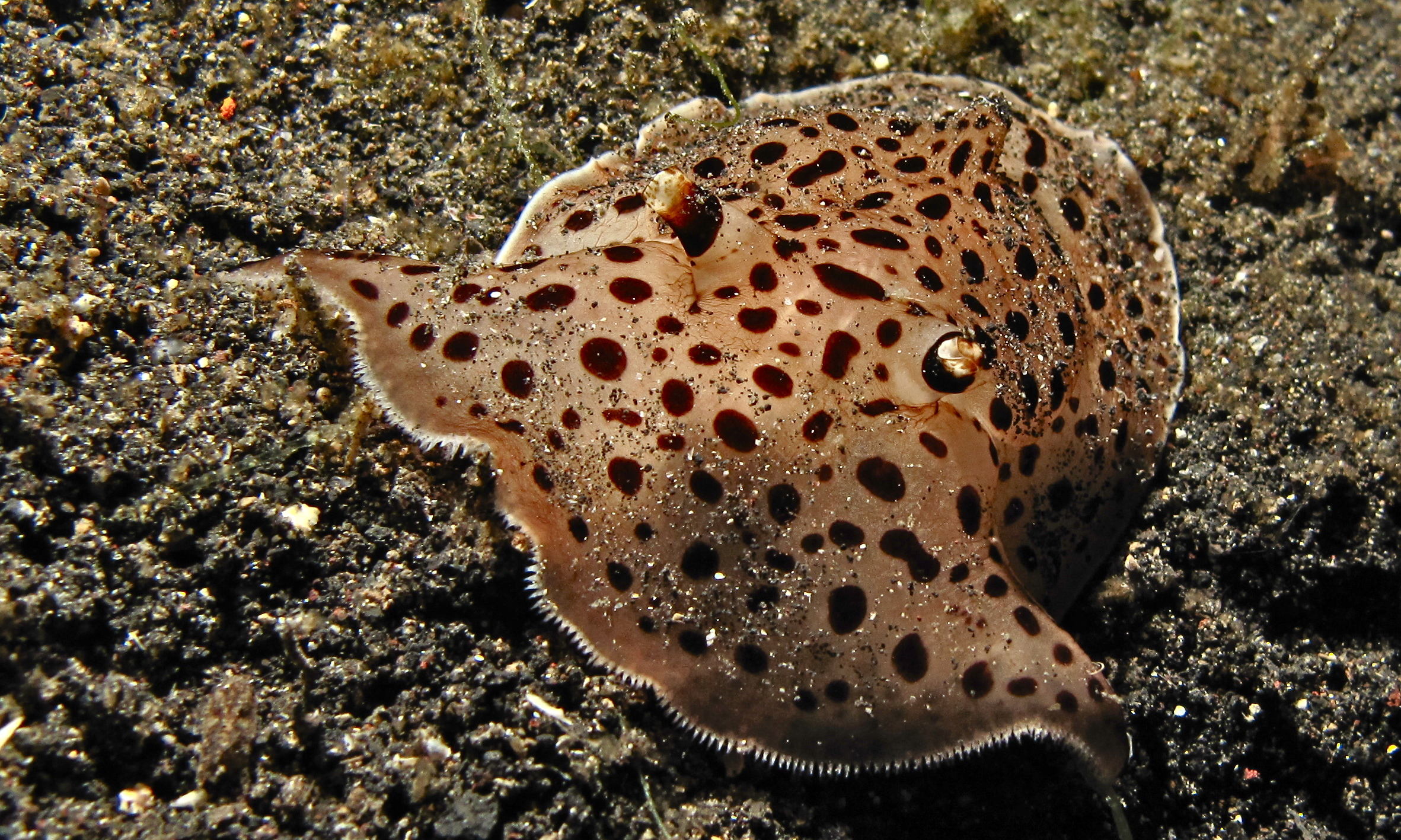
- From the left to right of each row, from top to bottom: Tomoberthella martensi, Berthella plumula, and Pleurobranchus forskalii (Pleurobranchidae); Euselenops luniceps (Pleurobranchaeidae)

Scientific classification
- Kingdom: Animalia
- Phylum: Mollusca
- Class: Gastropoda
- Superorder: Nudipleura
- Order: Pleurobranchida

Taxa
- See Taxonomy

= Pleurobranchida =

Pleurobranchida Temporal range: Palaeocene–Present

Order of molluscs

Pleurobranchida, also known as side-gilled slugs, is an order of gastropods belonging to the superorder Nudipleura.

== Taxonomy ==
In 1822, Férussac introduced the vernacular family “les Pleurobranches” to refer to known members of the current family Pleurobranchidae. In 1832, in the second volume of Histoire naturelle des vers of the Encyclopédie Méthodique by Deshayes, the same term was also used to refer to a higher-level group containing the genera Pleurobranchaea and Pleurobranchus, also grouped as “les Pleurobranches”, and Siphonaria and Umbrella, grouped as "les Ombrelles". The term was later latinized by Herrmannsen in 1847 as the suborder Pleurobranchia.

Several spelling and rank emendations followed. In Gray (1840b) it was emended to order Pleurobranchiata, containing the families Aplysiidae, Bullidae, Pleurobranchidae, Pterotracheidae, and Umbrellidae, in Pelseneer (1906) to “tribe” Pleurobranchomorpha, and in Golikov & Starobogatov (1989) to order Pleurobranchiformes and suborder Pleurobranchioidei.

In the taxonomy of Bouchet & Rocroi (2005), Pleurobranchomorpha is used and ranked as a subclade sister to the subclade Nudibranchia within the clade Nudipleura. Under this taxonomy it contained the superfamily Pleurobranchoidea, itself containing the single family Pleurobranchidae.

In 2017, Bouchet and colleagues emended the spelling and rank of Pleurobranchomorpha to order Pleurobranchida and separated some of the members of Pleurobranchidae into the additional families Pleurobranchaeidae and Quijotidae, all within the superfamily Pleurobranchoidea.

In 2023, Moles and colleagues included in Pleurobranchida the new superfamily Tomthompsonioidea, containing the family Tomthompsoniidae with the single genus Tomthompsonia. This analysis recovered the following phylogenetic tree, based on a maximum likelihood analysis rooted in Acteonoidea:

- Heterobranchia
  - Acteonoidea
    ⊞
    ⊟
    - Micromelo
    - Pupa
  - Nudipleura
    - Nudibranchia
      ⊞
      ⊟
      - Bathydoridoidei
        - Prodoris
        - Bathydoris
      - - - Carminodoris
          - Felimida
        - - - Armina
            - - Tritonia
              - Curnon
          - - - Heterodoris
              - Doridomorpha
            - Doridoxa
    - Pleurobranchida
      - Tomthompsoniidae
        Tomthompsonia
      - Pleurobranchoidea
        - Pleurobranchaeidae
          - Euselenops
          - - Pleurobranchella
            - Pleurobranchaea
        - Pleurobranchidae
          - - Berthellina
            - - Bathyberthella
              - Berthella
          - - - Tomoberthella
              - Pleurehdera
            - - Boreoberthella
              - Pleurobranchus

As such, the following taxa are recognised in the order Pleurobranchida:

- Superfamily Pleurobranchoidea Gray, 1827
  - Family Pleurobranchidae Gray, 1827
  - Family Pleurobranchaeidae Pilsbry, 1896
  - Family Quijotidae Ortea, Moro & Bacallado, 2016
- Superfamily Tomthompsonioidea Moles, Brenzinger, Berning, Martynov, Korshunova & Schrödl, 2023
  - Family Tomthompsoniidae Moles, Brenzinger, Berning, Martynov, Korshunova & Schrödl, 2023
