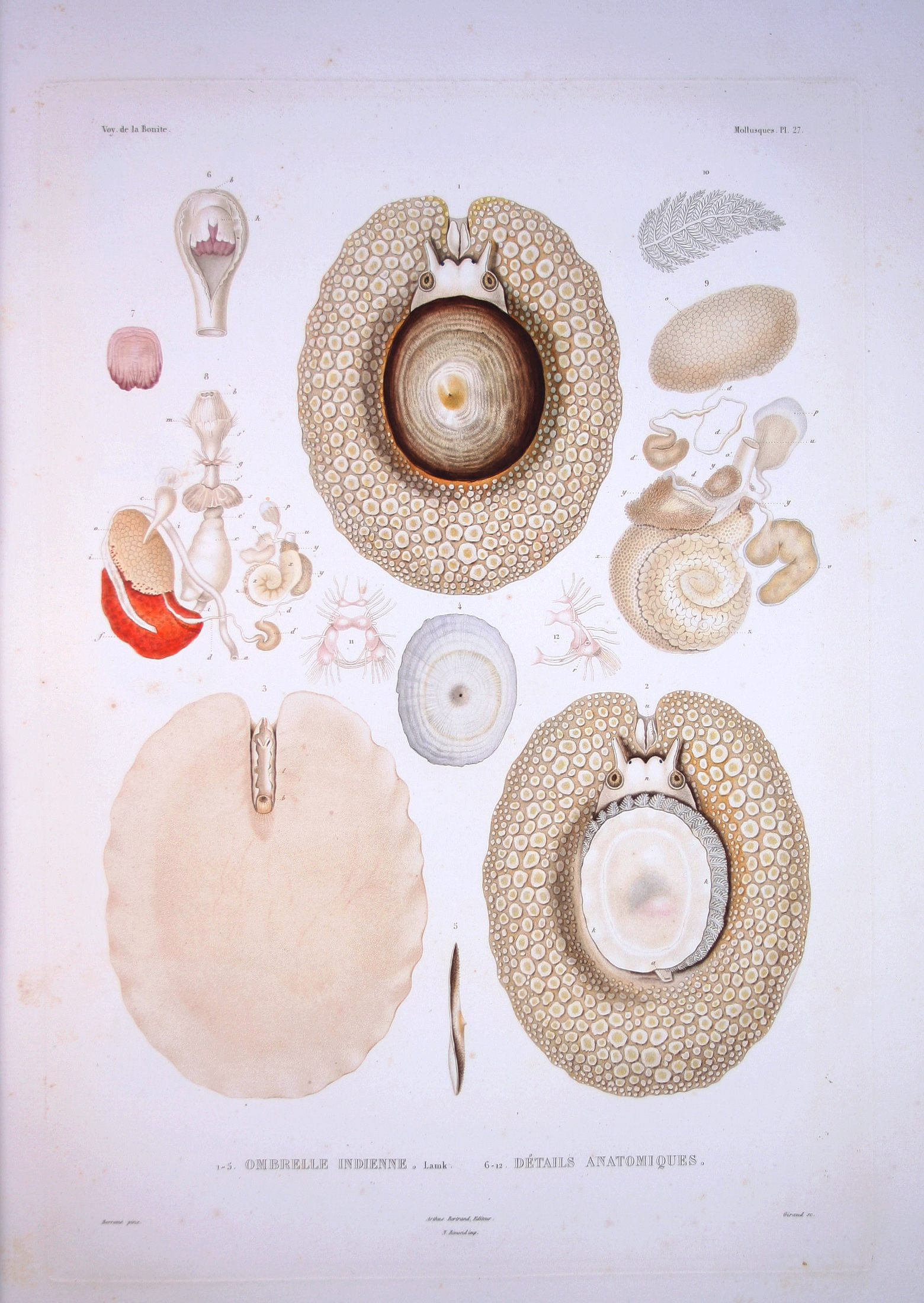
- Detailed illustration of Umbraculum umbraculum from 1852

Scientific classification
- Kingdom: Animalia
- Phylum: Mollusca
- Class: Gastropoda
- Clade: Euopisthobranchia
- Family: Umbraculidae
- Genus: Umbraculum; Schumacher, 1817

Species
- See text

Synonyms
- Gastroplax Blainville, 1819; Operculatum Mörch, 1852; Umbrella Lamarck, 1819

= Umbraculum (gastropod) =

Genus of gastropods

Umbraculum, common name the "umbrella slugs", is a genus of unusual sea snails or false limpets, marine gastropod molluscs in the family Umbraculidae.

== Species ==
There are probably only two species in the genus Umbraculum.

- Umbraculum ovale (Carpenter, 1856)
- Umbraculum umbraculum (Lightfoot, 1786) - Atlantic umbrella slug.

Other synonymised taxa

- Umbraculum bermudense (Mörch, 1875): synonym of Umbraculum umbraculum (Lightfoot, 1786)
- Umbraculum botanicum (Hedley, 1923): synonym of Umbraculum umbraculum (Lightfoot, 1786)
- Umbraculum indicum (Lamarck, 1819): synonym of Umbraculum umbraculum (Lightfoot, 1786)
- Umbraculum mediterraneum (Lamarck, 1819): synonym of Umbraculum umbraculum (Lightfoot, 1786)
- Umbraculum ovalis (Carpenter, 1856): synonym of Umbraculum umbraculum (Lightfoot, 1786)
- Umbraculum plicatulum (Martens, 1881): synonym of Umbraculum umbraculum (Lightfoot, 1786)
- Umbraculum pulchrum (Lin, 1981): synonym of Umbraculum umbraculum (Lightfoot, 1786)
- Umbrella indica (Lamarck, 1819): synonym of Umbraculum umbraculum (Lightfoot, 1786)
- Umbrella mediterranea (Lamarck, 1819): synonym of Umbraculum umbraculum (Lightfoot, 1786)
- Umbraculum rushii Dall, 1889: synonym of Plesiothyreus rushii (Dall, 1889)
- Umbraculum sinicum (Gmelin, 1791): synonym of Umbraculum umbraculum (Lightfoot, 1786)
