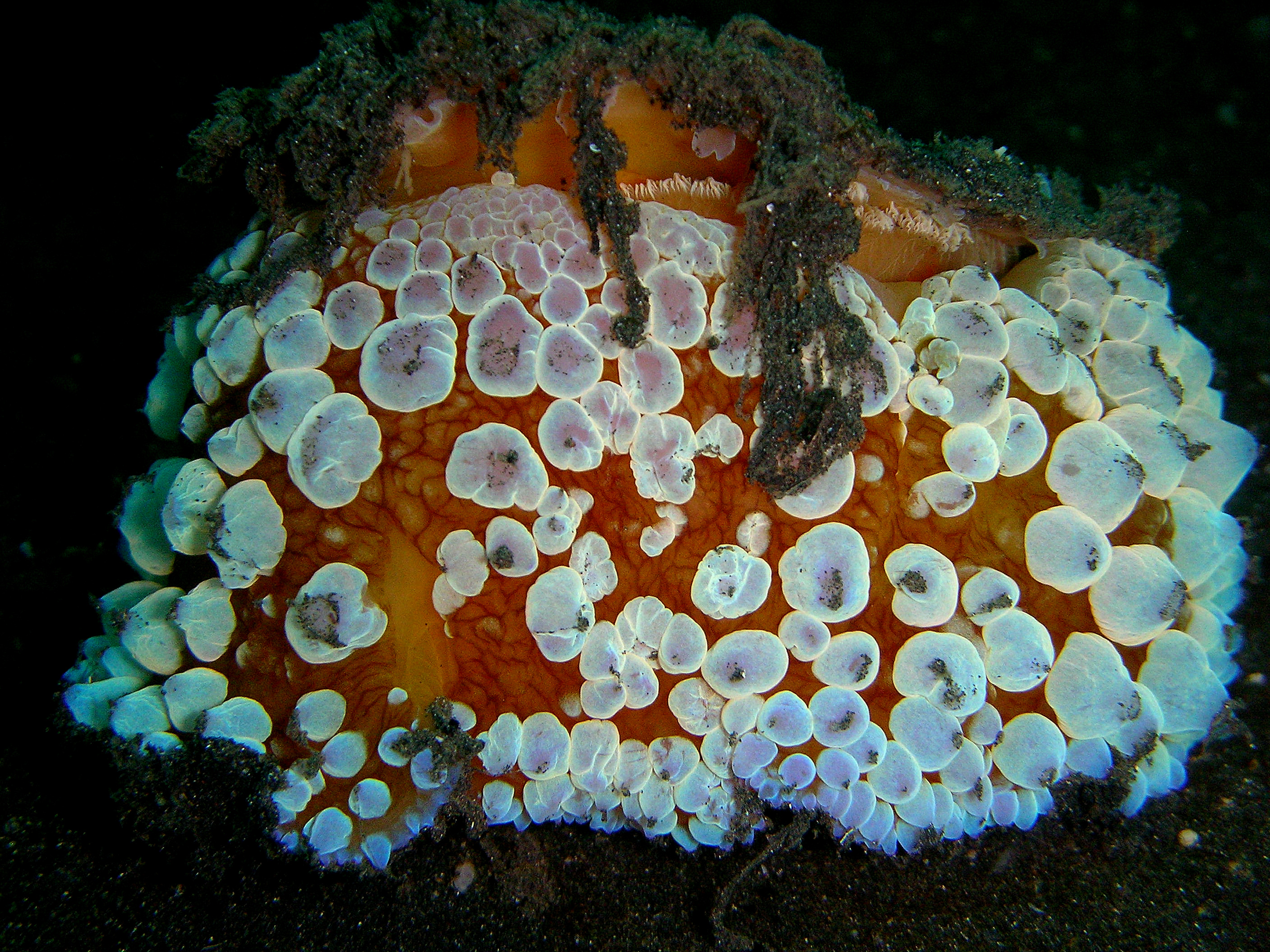
- Umbraculum umbraculum

Scientific classification
- Kingdom: Animalia
- Phylum: Mollusca
- Class: Gastropoda
- Clade: Euopisthobranchia
- Family: Umbraculidae; Dall, 1889

Genera
- See text

= Umbraculidae =

Family of gastropods

Umbraculidae are a taxonomic family of unusual sea snails or limpets, marine opisthobranch gastropod molluscs in the clade Umbraculida.

== Distribution ==
This family has a global distribution in tropical and subtropical seas.

== Genera ==
Genera within the family Umbraculidae include:

- Spiricella Rang, 1828
- Umbraculum Schumacher, 1817

Genera brought into synonymy

- Gastroplax Blainville, 1819: synonym of Umbraculum Schumacher, 1817
- Umbrella Lamarck, 1819: synonym of Umbraculum Schumacher, 1817
