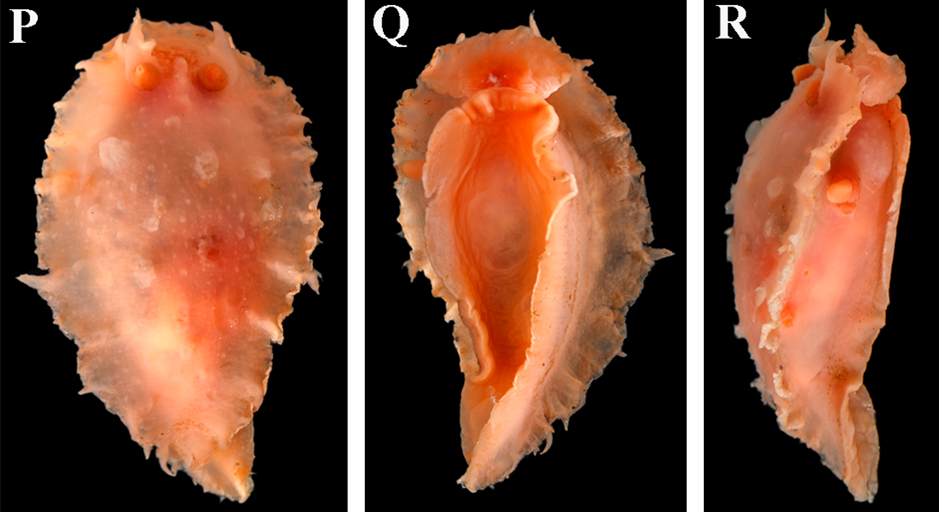
- From left to right: dorsal, ventral and lateral views of a live specimen of Heterodoris robusta

Scientific classification
- Kingdom: Animalia
- Phylum: Mollusca
- Class: Gastropoda
- Order: Nudibranchia
- Suborder: Arminacea
- Superfamily: Doridoxoidea
- Family: Heterodorididae; A. E. Verrill & Emerton, 1882
- Genus: Heterodoris; A. E. Verrill & Emerton, 1882

Type species
- Heterodoris robusta A. E. Verrill & Emerton, 1882

Species
- H. antipodes Willan, 1981; H. robusta A. E. Verrill & Emerton, 1882

= Heterodoris =

Genus of gastropods

Heterodoris is a genus of nudibranchs, shell-less marine gastropod molluscs or sea slugs. It is the only member of the family Heterodorididae in the superfamily Doridoxoidea.

A 2020 molecular study recovered Heterodoris grouping with the genera Doridomorpha and Doridoxa, with this group closely related to the family Arminidae.
