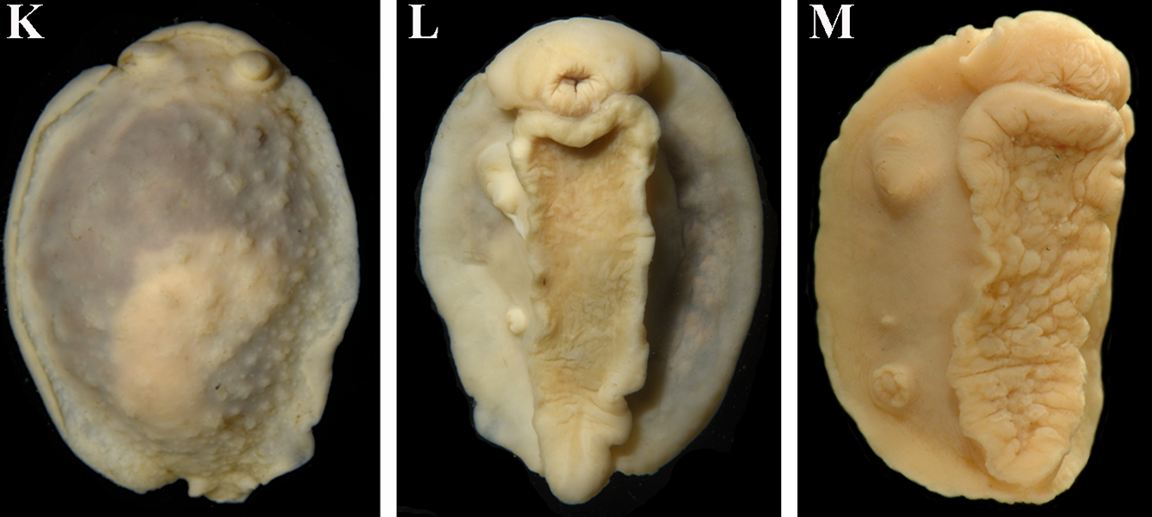
- Preserved specimens of Doridoxa walteri in dorsal (K), ventral (L), and lateroventral (M) view (K-L: length 17 mm; M: length 14 mm)

Scientific classification
- Kingdom: Animalia
- Phylum: Mollusca
- Class: Gastropoda
- Order: Nudibranchia
- Suborder: Arminacea
- Superfamily: Doridoxoidea
- Family: Doridoxidae; Bergh, 1899
- Genus: Doridoxa; Bergh, 1899

Type species
- Doridoxa ingolfiana Bergh, 1899

Species
- D. benthalis Barnard, 1963; D. walteri (A. Krause, 1892)

Synonyms
- Synonyms of D. walteri: D. ingolfiana Barnard, 1963

= Doridoxa =

Genus of gastropods

Doridoxa is a genus of nudibranchs, shell-less marine gastropod molluscs or sea slugs. It is the only member of the family Doridoxidae in the superfamily Doridoxoidea.

A 2020 molecular study recovered Doridoxa grouping with the genera Doridomorpha and Heterodoris, with this group closely related to the family Arminidae.
