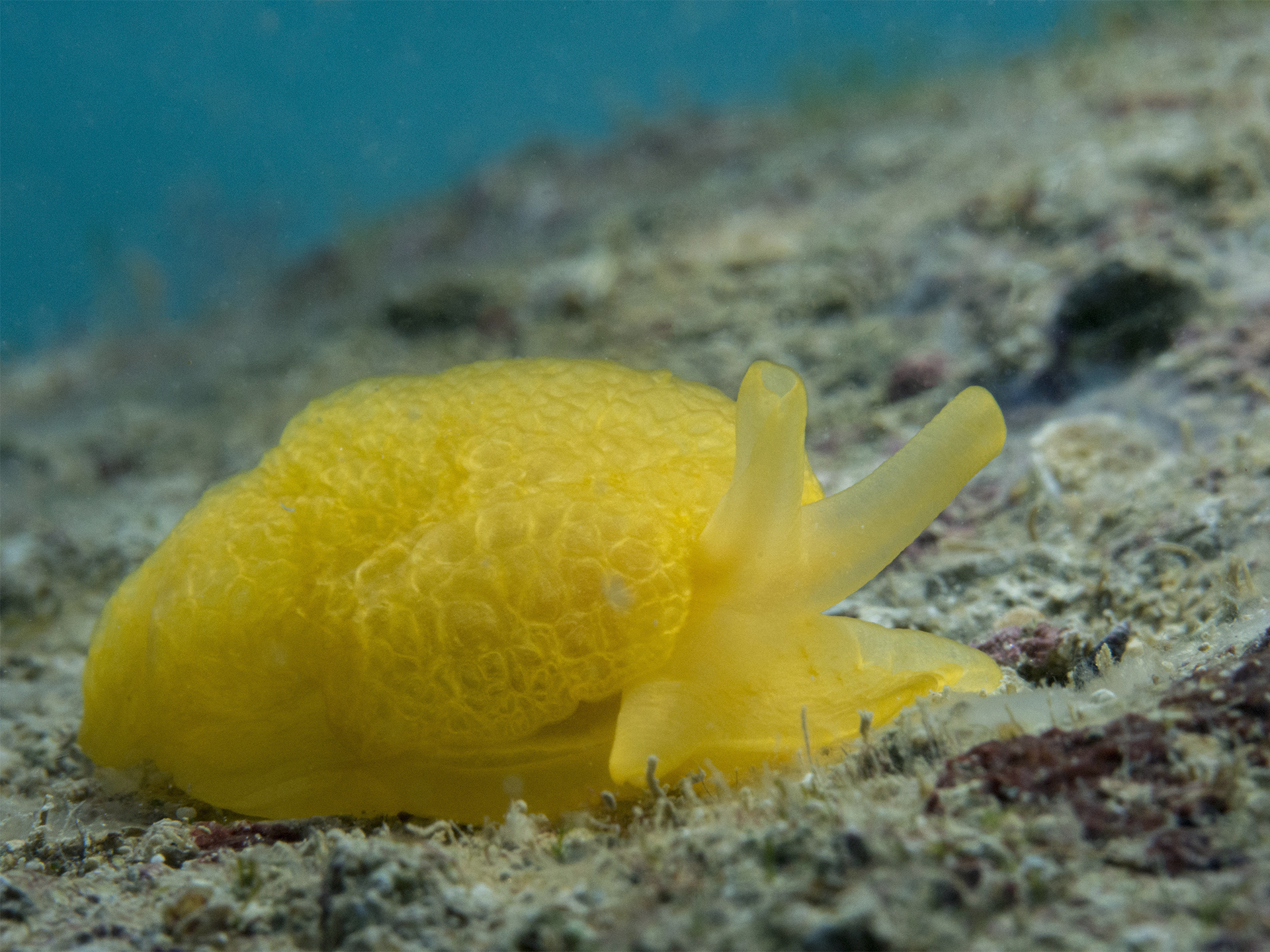

Scientific classification
- Domain: Eukaryota
- Kingdom: Animalia
- Phylum: Mollusca
- Class: Gastropoda
- Order: Pleurobranchida
- Family: Pleurobranchidae
- Genus: Berthella
- Species: B. plumula

Binomial name
- Berthella plumula (Montagu, 1803)

Synonyms
- Bulla plumula Montagu, 1803; Berthella porosa Blainville, 1824; Cleanthus montagui Leach, 1847; Lamellaria kleciachi Brusina, 1866; Pleurobranchus brevifrons Philippi, 1844; Pleurobranchus fleuriausi d'Orbigny, 1837; Pleurobranchus perforatus Philippi, 1844; Sigaretus stomatellus Risso, 1826

= Berthella plumula =

Species of mollusc

Berthella plumula, commonly known as yellow-plumed sea slug, is a gastropod mollusc usually found on rocky coasts in the infralittoral zone and which can live up to 30m depth.

== Description ==
Berthella plumula is an oval-shaped sea slug with an internal shell, which can be up to 30 mm (1.2 in) long. The body is up to 60 mm (2.4 in) and has a cream to orange colour and often displays reticulate markings. The head is flat and a large oral veil lies between the propodium and the mantle. The rhinophores are protruding and enrolled. The species has acid glands in the skin which secrete sulphuric acid for protection in case of danger.

== Distribution ==
Berthella plumula is found in the north-eastern Atlantic, the Mediterranean Sea, the English Channel and the North Sea.

== Behavior ==
=== Diet ===
Berthella plumula is a slow moving predator which scrapes its radula on rocks to feed on colonial ascidians of the genus Botryllus as well as on Oscarella sponges.

=== Reproduction ===
The species is hermaphrodite and the two individuals reciprocally fecundate each other by exchanging their sperm. The reproductive period occurs in spring. The laying is tube-shaped and the eggs are displayed in spiral.

== Similar species ==
Berthella plumula can be confused with Berthella stellata, which is smaller and displays a small white mark on its back, and with Berthellina edwardsii, which is usually bigger and more red.

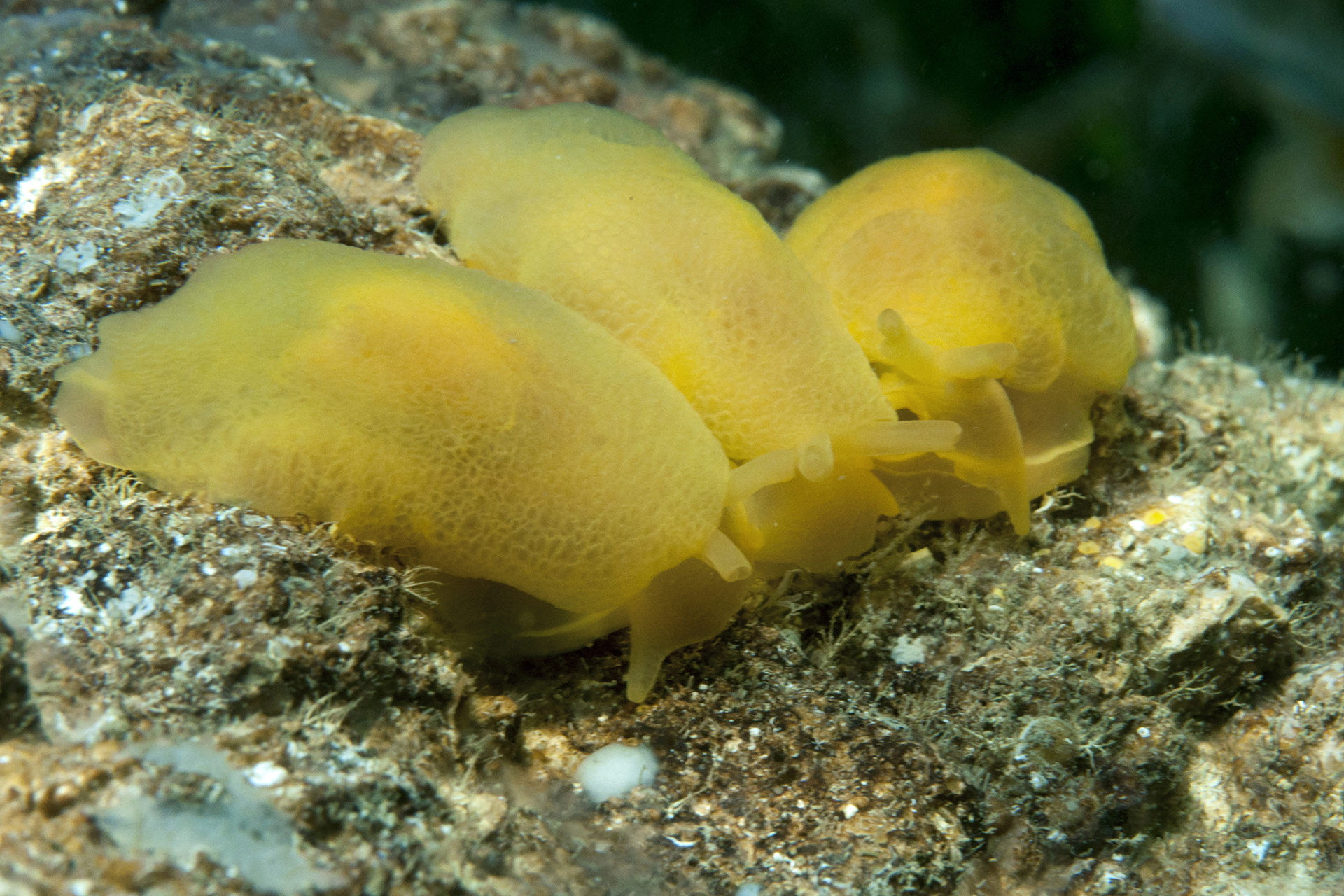
Three specimens of Berthella plumula in Pula, Croatia

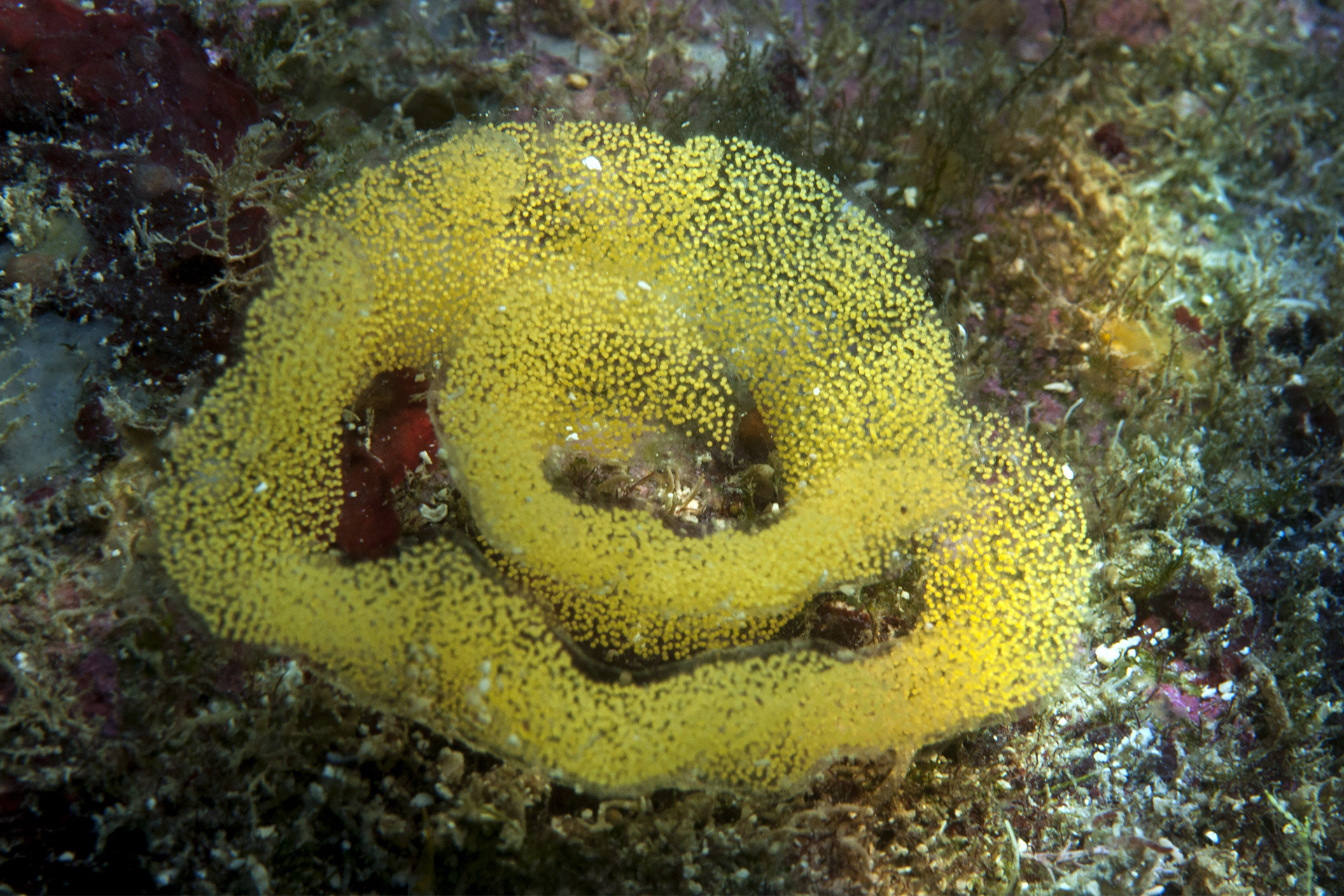
Spiral eggs of Berthella plumula in Pula, Croatia

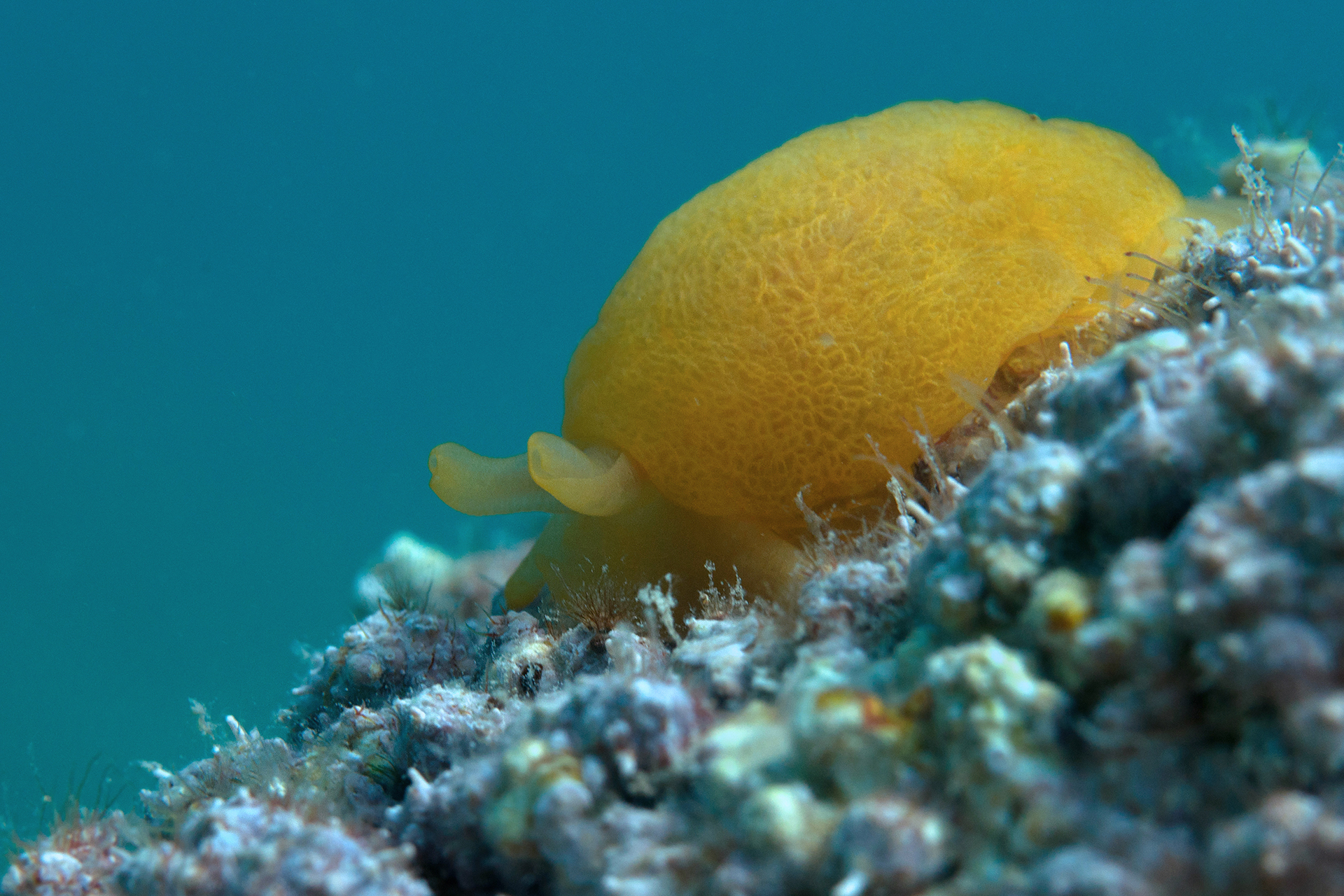
Yellow-plumed sea slug in Pula, Croatia
