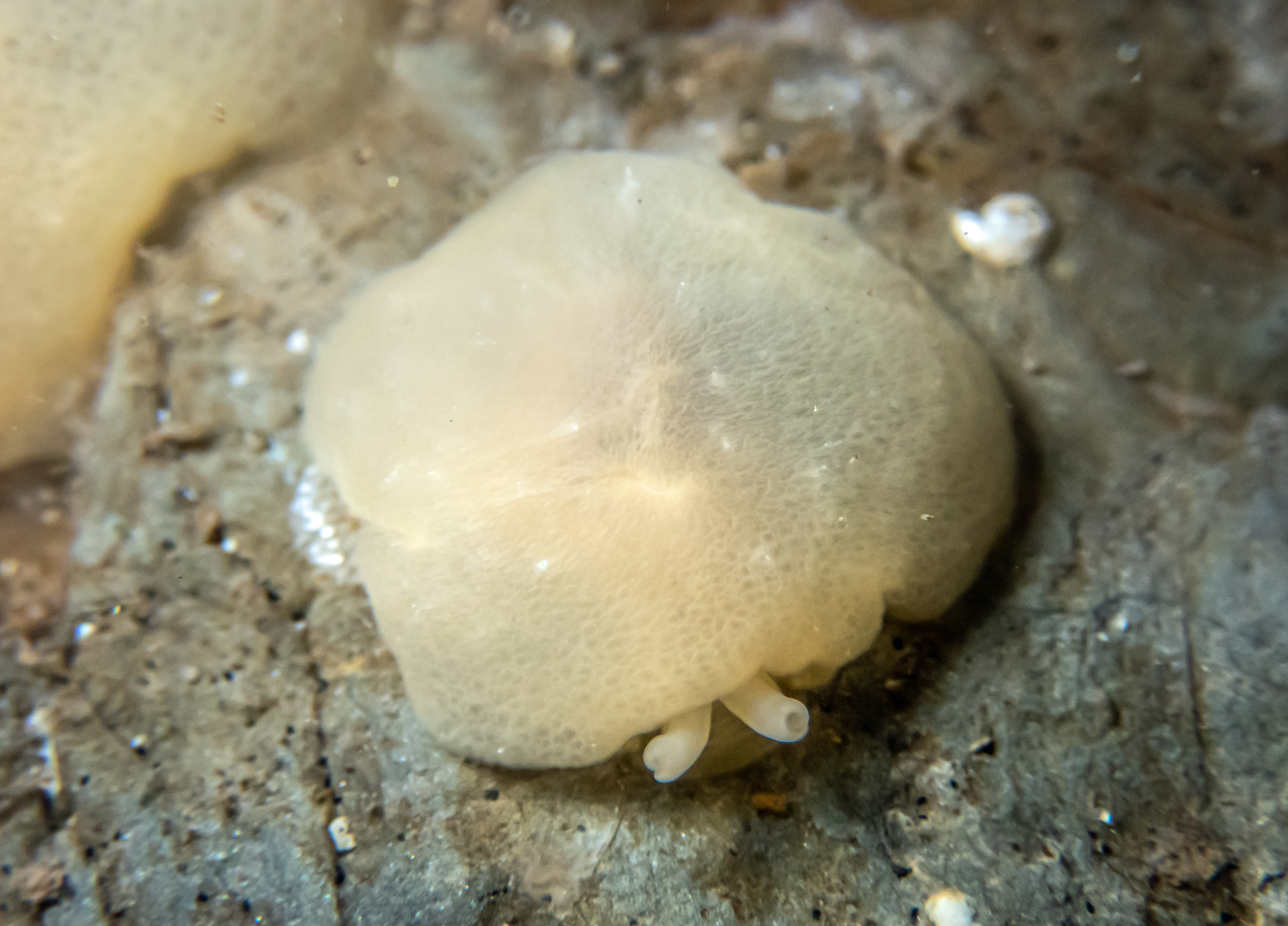
- Berthella medietas in Plimmerton, New Zealand

Scientific classification
- Kingdom: Animalia
- Phylum: Mollusca
- Class: Gastropoda
- Order: Pleurobranchida
- Family: Pleurobranchidae
- Genus: Berthella
- Species: B. medietas

Binomial name
- Berthella medietas (Burn, 1962)

Synonyms
- Berthella mediatas

= Berthella medietas =

Species of sea slug

Berthella medietas is a species of sea slug, a marine gastropod mollusk in the family Pleurobranchidae.

== Description ==
Berthella medietas has a small internal shell and displays a distinctive orange to bronze coloration and it can reach a maximum length of approximately 30 mm.

The gill is relatively small, bearing 18–23 pinnate branches, it's covered by the mantle and is partially attached to the body wall.

The rhinophores are long, enrolled and pale yellow to orange in colour. They are fused at the base and situated above a broad oral veil, which is large, triangular, grooved along the lateral edges and deeply notched anteriorly.

The foot is dirty yellow-orange, unspotted and features a darker anterior mucous groove. A triangular pedal gland is present on the sole, located slightly off centre.

Berthella medietas closely resembles Berthella stellata, a widely distributed species, but differs externally by lacking the characteristic white cross-like mantle pattern of B. stellata.

The species name has occasionally appeared as "Berthella mediatas" due to a typographical error in the original description, where the species epithet was inconsistently spelled, although the correct form appears elsewhere in the same document. The correct and currently accepted name, Berthella medietas, is confirmed by Willan (1987).

== Distribution ==
Berthella medietas is a native species of southern Australia and New Zealand.

== Habitat ==
This species inhabits partially sheltered and open rocky shorelines, typically at depths of up to 10 meters. It has been recorded in low numbers in intertidal and shallow sublittoral zones. Observations by Goddard report that B. medietas feeds on the plakinid sponge Oscarella species.
