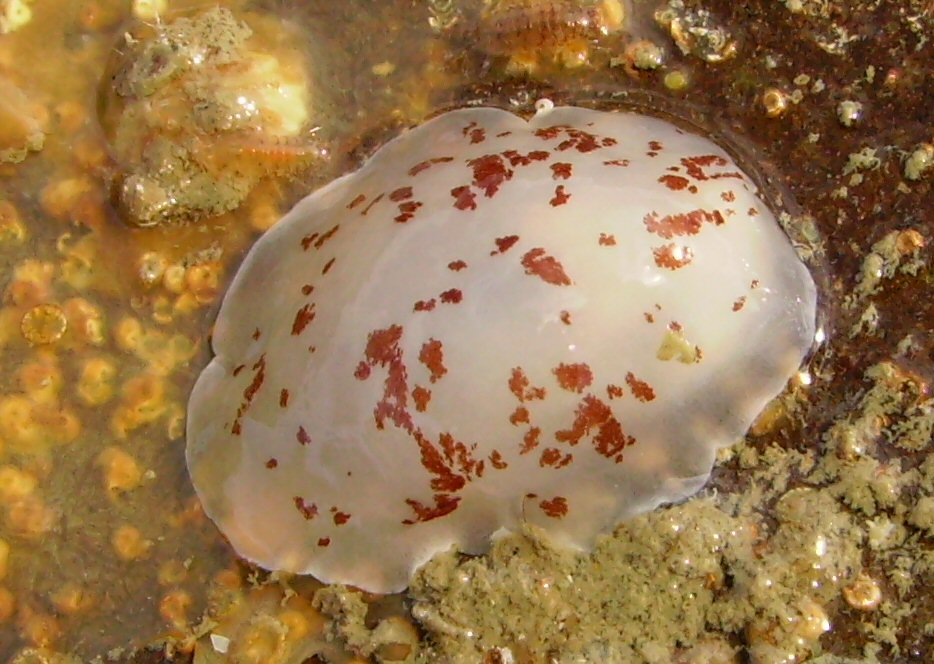

Scientific classification
- Kingdom: Animalia
- Phylum: Mollusca
- Class: Gastropoda
- Order: Pleurobranchida
- Family: Pleurobranchidae
- Genus: Berthella
- Species: B. ornata

Binomial name
- Berthella ornata (Cheeseman, 1878)

Synonyms
- Pleurobranchus ornatus Cheeseman, 1878; Suter 1913; Bouvieria ornata Morton & Miller, 1968; Powell, 1979

= Berthella ornata =

Species of gastropod

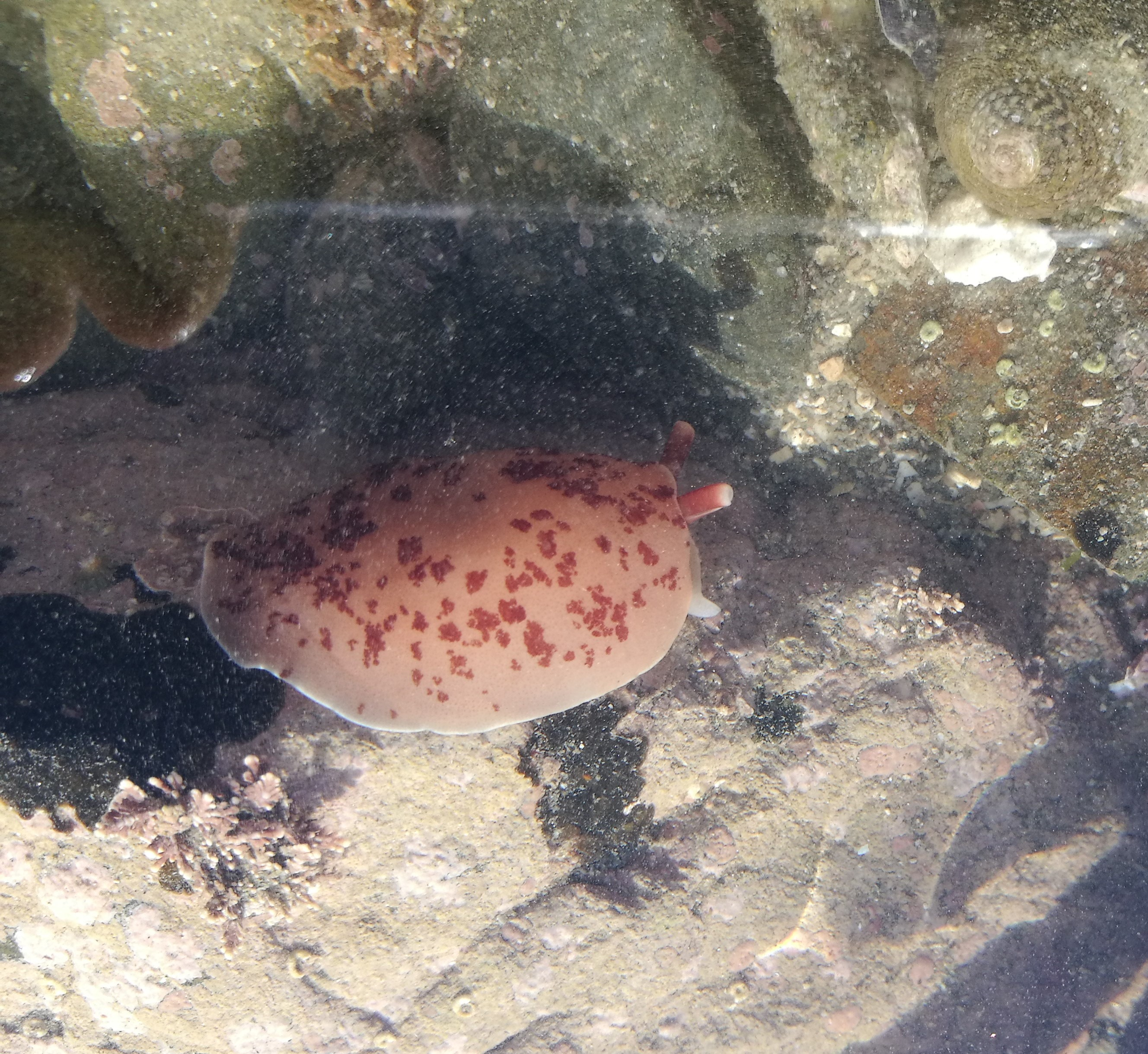
Ornate side-gilled sea slug swimming

Berthella ornata is a species of sea slug, a marine gastropod mollusk in the family Pleurobranchidae. It is sometimes called the ornate side-gilled sea slug.

== Description ==
This is a distinctive pleurobranch up to 70 mm (2.8 in) in length, the dorsal surface bearing reddish or brownish spots overlaying an opaque background that can vary from white to dark red or brown. A shell up to 20 mm (0.79 in) is hidden under the smooth mantle, which is white at the margin, the foot and gill are also white. The rhinophores are brown with white tips. B. ornata is slow moving and feeds on sponges at night, often emitting a milky fluid if disturbed. It is usually found hiding under boulders and stones during the day, with the head and rhinophores retracted under the mantle.

== Distribution ==
Endemic to New Zealand, where it is becoming less common. It is found at low tide through the sub-littoral fringe down to 6 metres deep.
