= Berthella patagonica =

Scientific classification
- Kingdom: Animalia
- Phylum: Mollusca
- Class: Gastropoda
- Order: Pleurobranchida
- Family: Pleurobranchidae
- Genus: Berthella
- Species: B. patagonica

Binomial name
- Berthella patagonica (d'Orbigny, 1835)

Synonyms
- Bouvieria patagonica (d'Orbigny, 1835); Pleurobranchus patagonicus d'Orbigny, 1835

Species of sea slug

Berthella patagonica is a species of sea slug within the family Pleurobranchidae. The species is found along the coasts of Argentina along Santa Cruz in demersal environments. It grows up to 2.4 centimeters in length.
