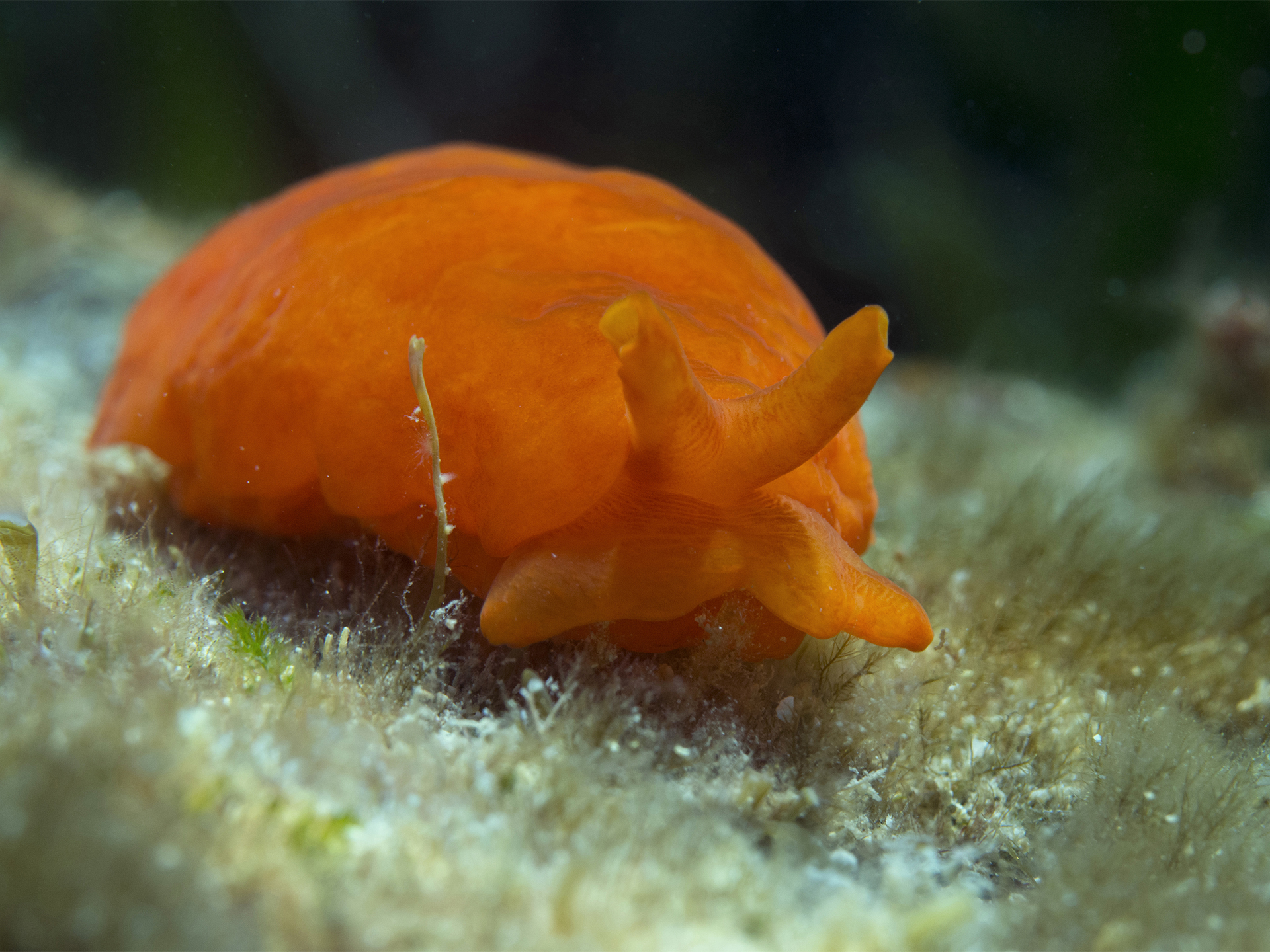

Scientific classification
- Kingdom: Animalia
- Phylum: Mollusca
- Class: Gastropoda
- Order: Pleurobranchida
- Family: Pleurobranchidae
- Genus: Berthellina
- Species: B. edwardsii

Binomial name
- Berthellina edwardsii (Vayssière, 1897)

Synonyms
- Berthella edwardsii Vayssière, 1897; Berthella saidensis O'Donoghue, 1929

= Berthellina edwardsii =

Species of sea slug

Berthellina edwardsii is a species of sea slug, a gastropod mollusc in the family Pleurobranchidae. It is native to the northeastern Atlantic Ocean and the Mediterranean Sea.

== Description ==
Berthellina edwardsii is a large sea slug, growing to a length of 5 to 6 cm (2.0 to 2.4 in). The head bears a pair of smooth, rolled rhinophores at the top, but the triangular buccal veil and a pair of low-lying tentacles are less discernable. There is a small flattened internal shell which looks whitish when viewed through the translucent tissue, and there are dark spots visible through the dorsal surface which are the digestive glands. The foot is broad, and the gill is located on the right side of the body, between the foot and the mantle. The colour varies from whitish or lemon yellow to deep orange-red. This sea slug is very similar in appearance to Berthella aurantiaca; there are no distinctive external features distinguishing the two, but B. aurantiaca has a much larger internal shell. Another similar species is Berthella stellata, but that is rather smaller, transparent or whitish, and has a star-shaped opaque pattern in the centre of its back.

== Ecology ==
Berthellina edwardsii is mainly nocturnal, hiding during the day in a crack or under a rock. Glands on its mantle secrete a white acidic fluid which is distasteful to fish. The bright colouring serves as a warning of its toxicity to potential predators.

Berthellina edwardsii feeds largely on sponges and tunicates, rasping the surface with the fine teeth on its radula. Breeding takes place in autumn. Each individual is a hermaphrodite, and a pair of slugs will orientate themselves so that their genital openings are close together, and exchange sperm. The eggs are numerous but tiny, and are laid in a whitish, coiled cylindrical, jelly-like ribbon, stuck to the substrate.

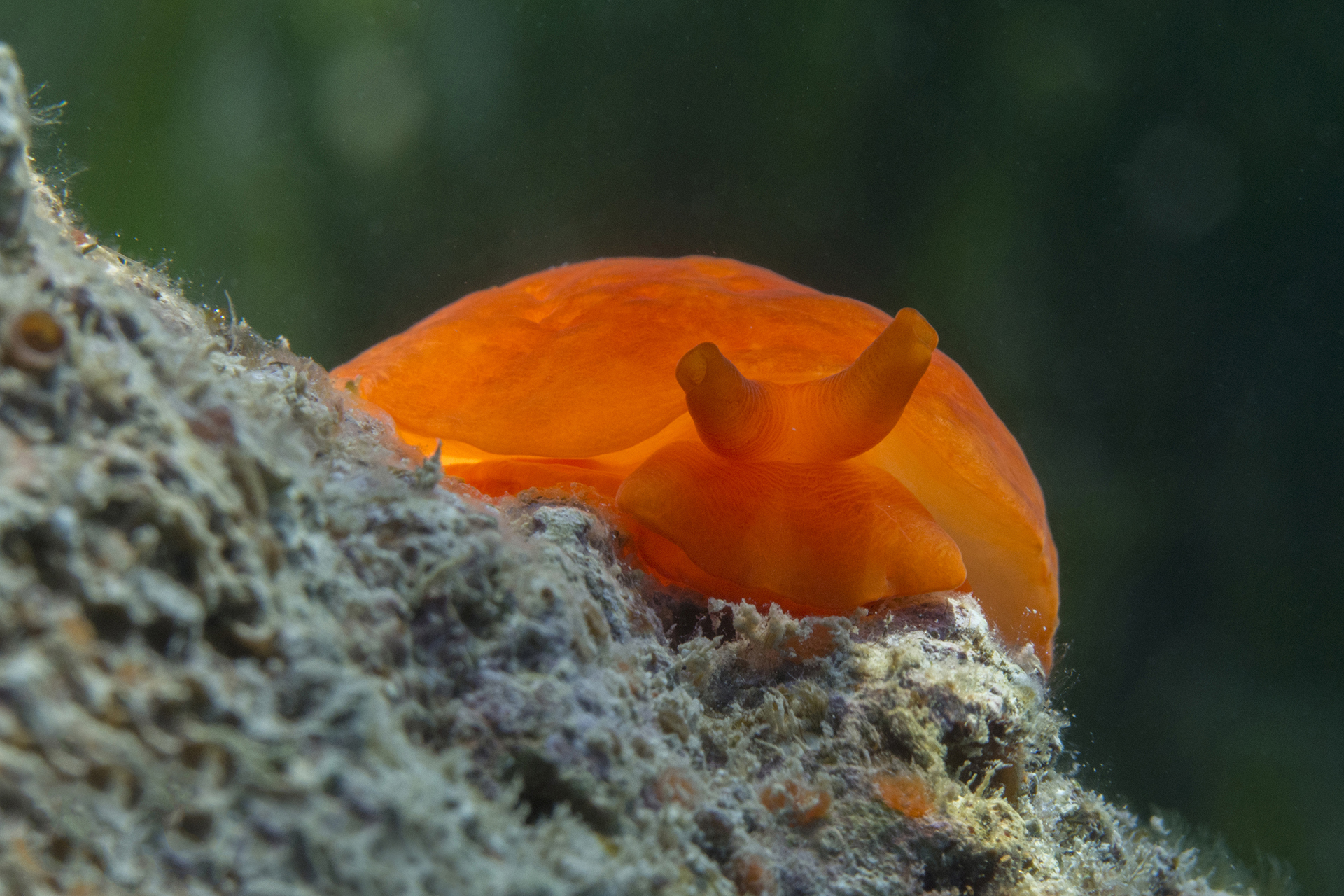
Berthellina edwardsii in Pula, Croatia

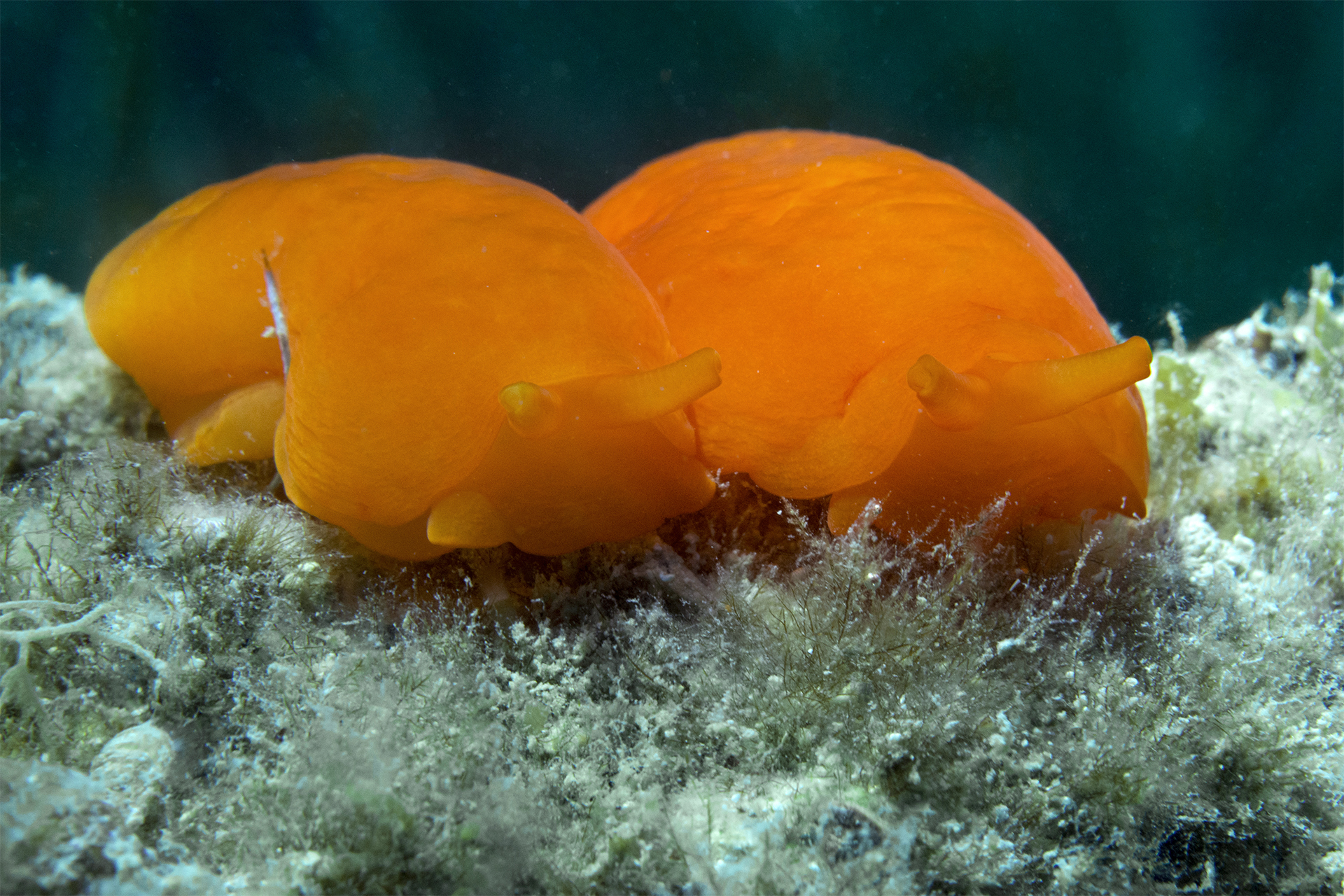
Two specimens of Berthellina edwardsii

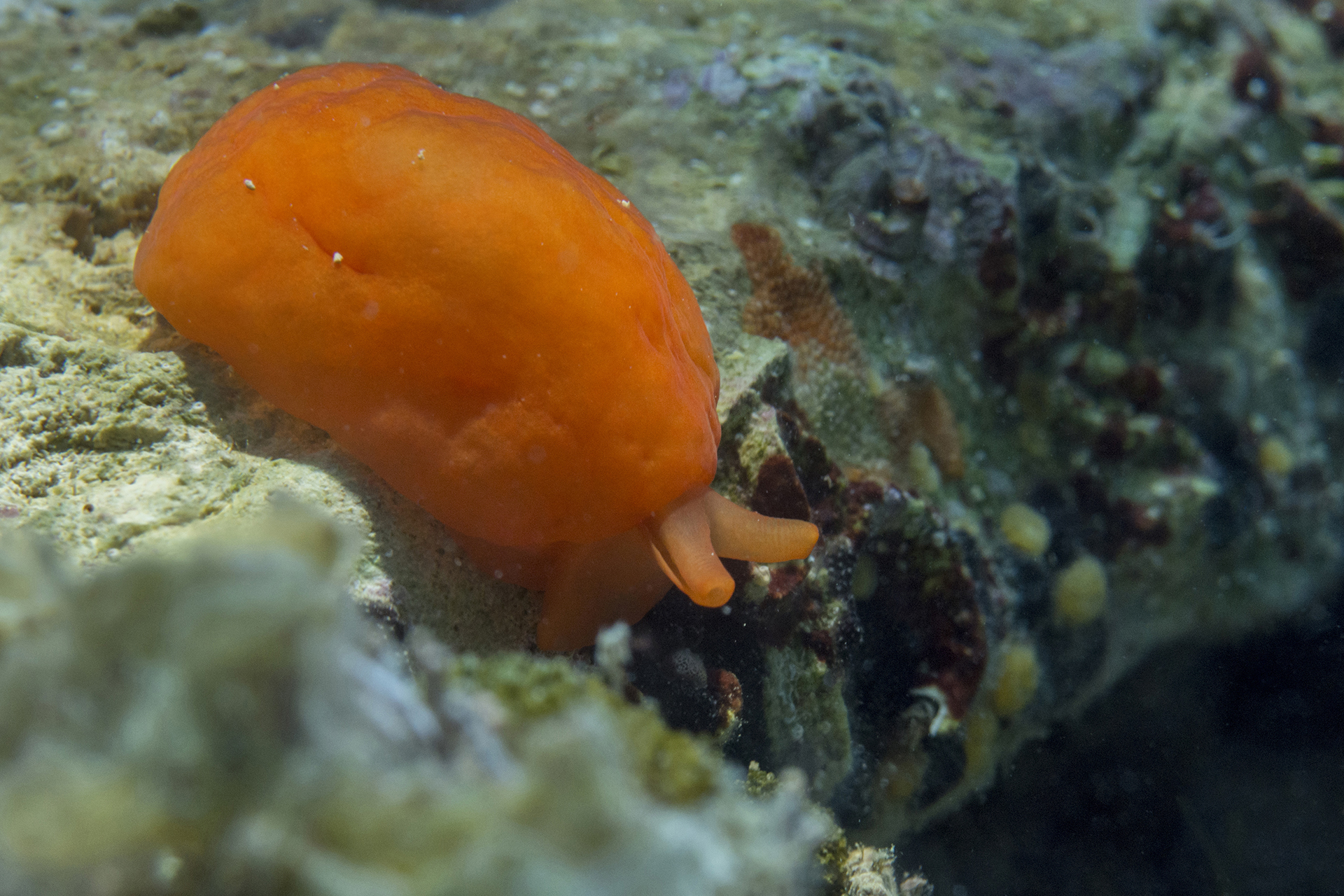
Berthellina edwardsii in Pula, Croatia
