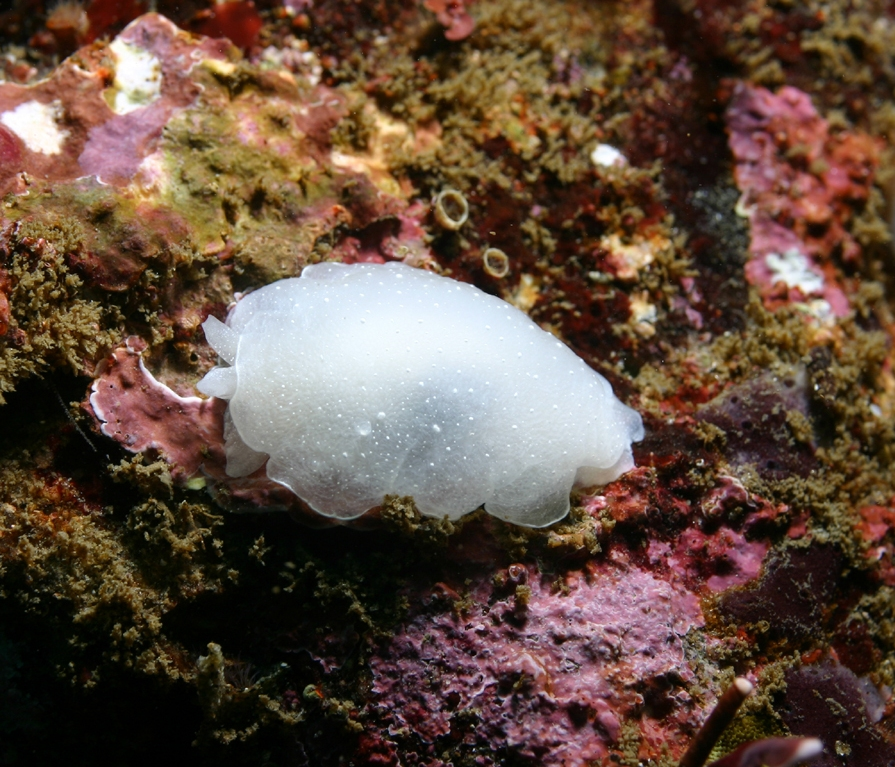
- Berthella californica in Point Lobos, Big Sur, California

Scientific classification
- Kingdom: Animalia
- Phylum: Mollusca
- Class: Gastropoda
- Order: Pleurobranchida
- Family: Pleurobranchidae
- Genus: Berthella
- Species: B. californica

Binomial name
- Berthella californica (Dall, 1900)

Synonyms
- Boreoberthella californica; Pleurobranchus californicus

= Berthella californica =

Species of sea slug

Berthella californica is a species of sea slug, a marine gastropod mollusk in the family Pleurobranchidae.

== Distribution ==
This species is distributed widely in the North Pacific Ocean, ranging from the Sea of Japan and Korea to the Galapagos Islands, including the Pacific coast from Ventura County, southern California, down to Panama and Baja California, Mexico.

== Habitat ==
B. californica is typically found in intertidal and subtidal zones, often on reefs or rocky substrates with algae, at depths ranging roughly from 25 m to 86 m. It tends to inhabit vertical reef surfaces offshore and can be found on red algae and rocks.

== Taxonomy ==
Berthella californica was originally described by W.H. Dall in 1900 as Pleurobranchus californicus based on specimens from San Pedro, California. Subsequent anatomical and molecular studies have confirmed its distinction from closely related species and suggested that B. californica is sister to the genus Berthellina, indicating potential future taxonomic revision.

== Morphology ==
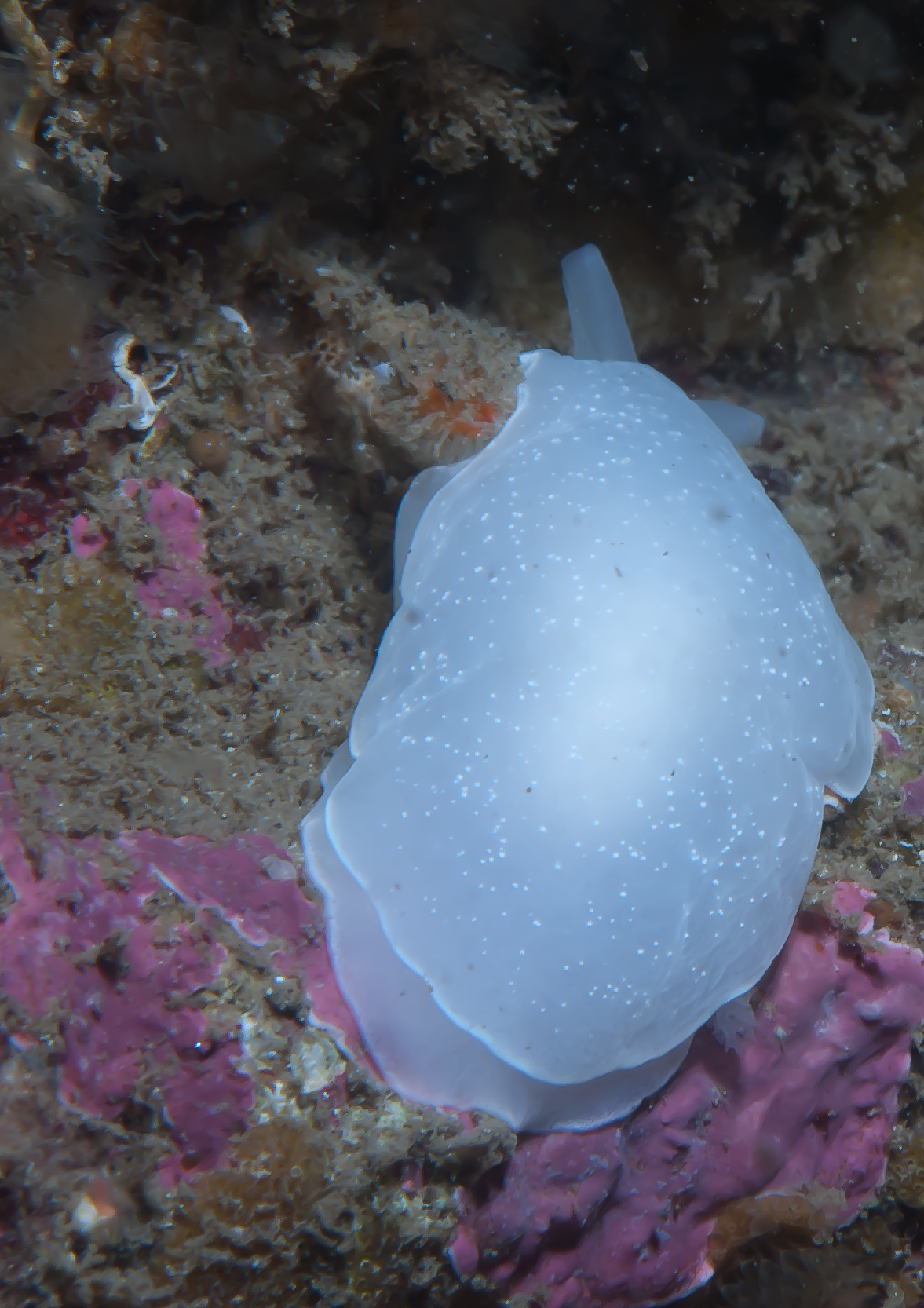
A shy, nocturnal Berthella californica that glides silently under rocks.

Berthella californica is characterized by a smooth mantle that ranges in color from whitish cream to brown, adorned with numerous uniformly sized white spots that are not raised on tubercles. A distinctive feature is a white marginal band around the notum, and some individuals may exhibit a pale longitudinal stripe along the dorsum. The rhinophores are simple and typically match the body color without distinct striping.

The species typically lacks white spots on structures other than the mantle, such as the rhinophores, oral veil, or foot. The shell is elongate with a thin periostracum and a small spiral nucleus. The gill is short with a finely granular stem. The radular teeth include hook-shaped teeth with small denticles that may be present or absent.

Molecular and morphological data obtained in this study reveals that these two morphotypes constitute distinct species. The name B. californica (type locality: San Pedro, California) is retained for the southern morphotype, whereas the name Berthella chacei J. Q. Burch, 1944 (type locality: Crescent City, California) is resurrected for the northern morphotype.

== Reproduction ==
During copulation, observations have documented clustering behavior interpreted as mating aggregations, where multiple individuals come together, likely to increase the chance of successful fertilization. Following mating, B. californica lays delicate, loosely coiled ribbon-like egg masses that are often attached to algae or rocky substrates. These egg ribbons typically match the adult’s mantle coloration, which may serve as camouflage to reduce predation risk.
