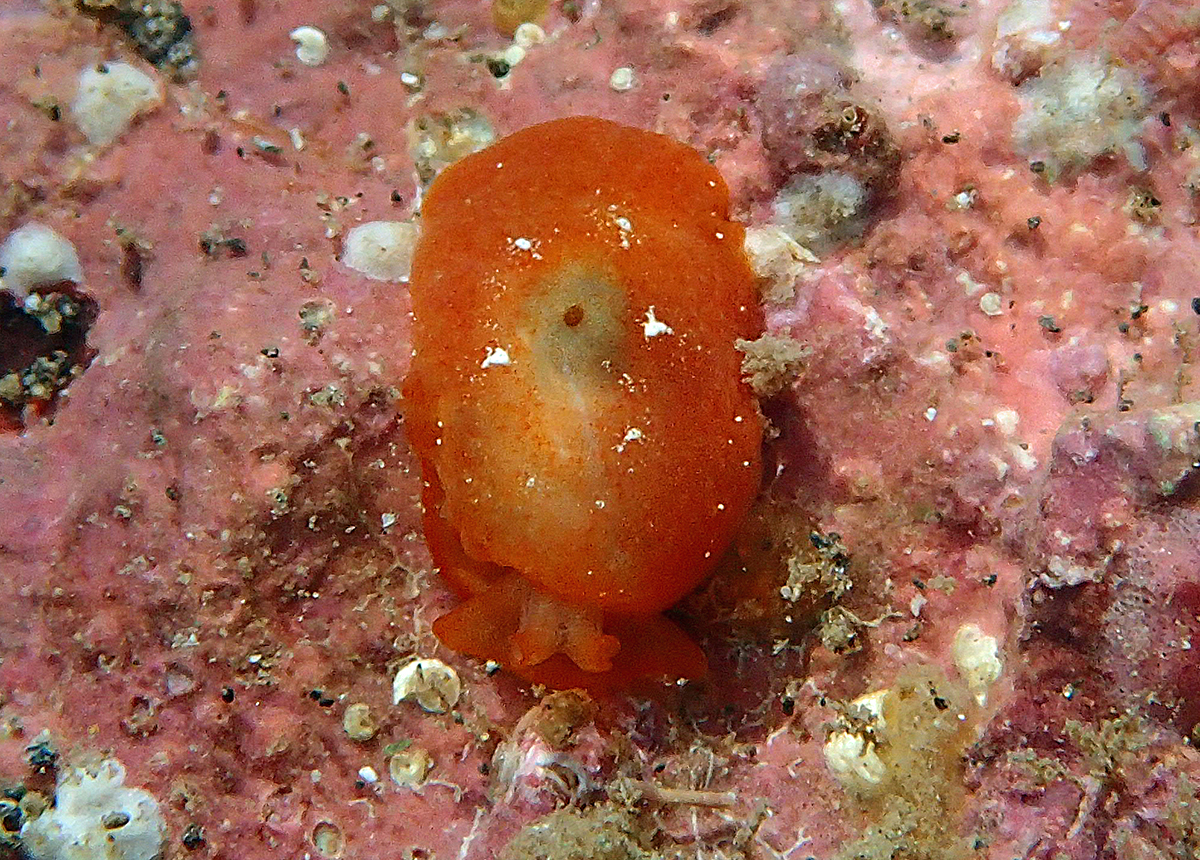
- Berthella caledonica in Réunion, Overseas France, Mascarene Islands

Scientific classification
- Kingdom: Animalia
- Phylum: Mollusca
- Class: Gastropoda
- Order: Pleurobranchida
- Family: Pleurobranchidae
- Genus: Berthella
- Species: B. caledonica

Binomial name
- Berthella caledonica (Risbec, 1928)

Synonyms
- Pleurobranchus caledonicus

= Berthella caledonica =

Species of sea slug

Berthella caledonica is a species of sea slug, a marine gastropod mollusk in the family Pleurobranchidae.

== Distribution ==
This pleurobranchid was recorded by Jean Risbec at Orphanage Bay, Nouméa, New Caledonia beneath dead coral blocks, with three specimens observed at the time.

The species Berthella caledonica is currently distributed in the Indo-Pacific region in island territories such as New Caledonia, Australia, Hawaii, Okinawa, Marshall Islands and Réunion.

== Habitat ==
Berthella caledonica is usually a nocturnal species that can often be found in highly to moderately exposed rocky areas. It usually is situated at depths of 4–20 metres (13–66 ft) and during the day-time is often found in pairs under rocks in lagoons and reef flats.

== Size ==
Adults reach up to 50 mm in length; the internal shell measures about 18 mm, is thin, fragile, transparent and pearly, with an oval, slightly concave form and fine growth lines.

== Morphology ==
The broad, smooth mantle is strongly curved and yellowish with dark brown spots. When disturbed, the animal contracts into a tuberculate form and secretes copious black mucus from nasal glands. A central pallial opening is encircled by a pale ring. The head bears two laterally split tentacles, a triangular veil and black eye spots at the tentacle bases. The foot is narrower than the mantle, flared anteriorly and rounded posteriorly. The right side features a bi-lamellar gill and the genital opening. Mantle spines, star-shaped and increasingly numerous toward the center, lie beneath the free margin.

== Anatomy ==
=== Digestive system ===
A large buccal bulb with armature, a red muscular zone and a prominent retractor muscle; radula with ~130 rows of 300 unicuspid lateral teeth; paired and unpaired salivary glands; a convoluted oesophagus terminating at a right-sided anus.

=== Nervous system ===
A circumenteric nerve collar with paired cerebral, pallial and pedal ganglia; short optic nerves to protruding eyes; extensive suboesophageal commissures.

=== Reproductive system ===
Hermaphroditic gland overlaying the liver; ducts leading to albumen gland, uterus, cervix and separate male pathway with a prostate gland and inconspicuous penis; adjacent glaire gland.
