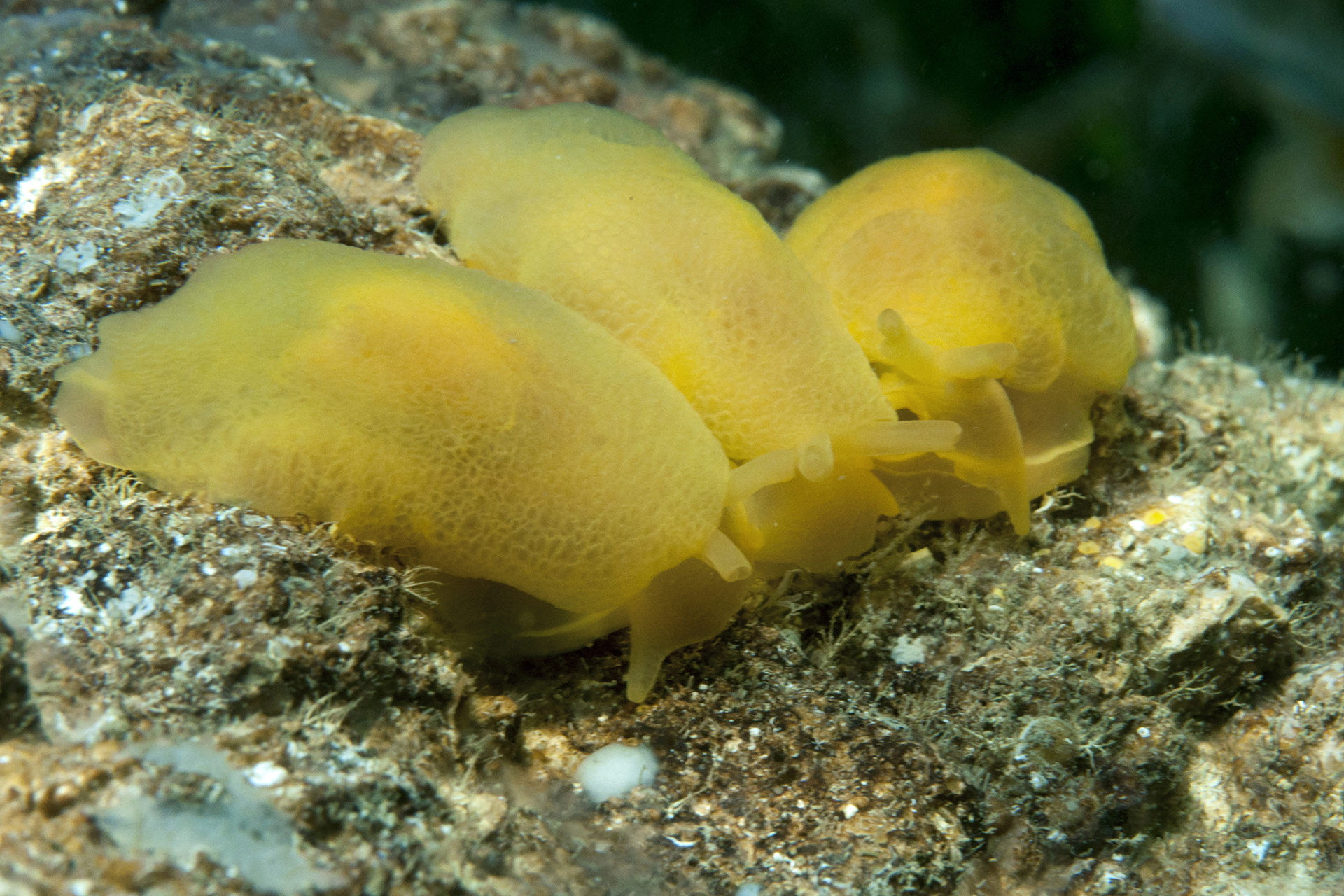
- Three specimens of Berthella plumula in Pula, Croatia
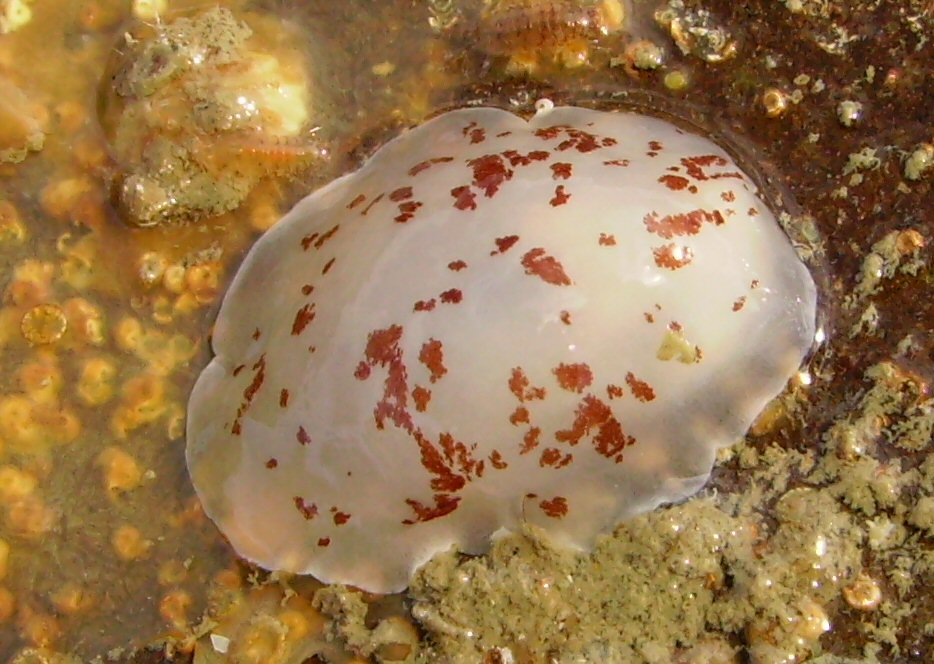
- A live individual of Berthella ornata, in situ, head end towards the upper right, but head retracted due to partial exposure to the air at low tide

Scientific classification
- Kingdom: Animalia
- Phylum: Mollusca
- Class: Gastropoda
- Order: Pleurobranchida
- Family: Pleurobranchidae
- Genus: Berthella; Blainville, 1824

Species
- 25 species (see text)

= Berthella =

Genus of gastropods

Berthella is a genus of sea slugs, marine gastropod mollusks in the family Pleurobranchidae.

== Species ==
Species within the genus Berthella are:

- Berthella Blainville, 1824
  - Berthella africana (Pruvot-Fol, 1953)
  - Berthella agassizii (MacFarland, 1909)
  - Berthella americana (A. E. Verrill, 1885)
  - † Berthella aquitaniensis Á. Valdés & Lozouet, 2000
  - † Berthella arctata Pacaud, 2015
  - † Berthella ateles Á. Valdés & Lozouet, 2000
  - Berthella aurantiaca (Risso, 1818)
  - Berthella caledonica (Risbec, 1928)
  - Berthella californica (Dall, 1900)
  - Berthella elongata (Cantraine, 1835)
  - Berthella grovesi Hermosillo & Á. Valdés, 2008
  - † Berthella jodiae Pacaud, 2015
  - Berthella medietas Burn, 1962
  - Berthella ocellata (Delle Chiaje, 1830)
  - Berthella ornata (Cheeseman, 1878)
  - Berthella patagonica (A. d'Orbigny, 1836)
  - Berthella perforata (R. A. Philippi, 1844)
  - Berthella platei (Bergh, 1898)
  - Berthella plumula (Montagu, 1803)
  - † Berthella pristina Pacaud, 2015
  - Berthella punctata Alvim & Pimenta, 2015
  - Berthella schroedli Araya & Á. Valdés, 2016
  - Berthella serenitas (Burn, 1962)
  - Berthella sideralis Lovén, 1846
  - Berthella spatula Ortea, Moro & Caballer, 2014
  - Berthella tamiu Ev. Marcus, 1984

=== Species inquirenda ===
- Berthella dautzenbergi (R. B. Watson, 1897)
- Berthella tupala Er. Marcus, 1957
