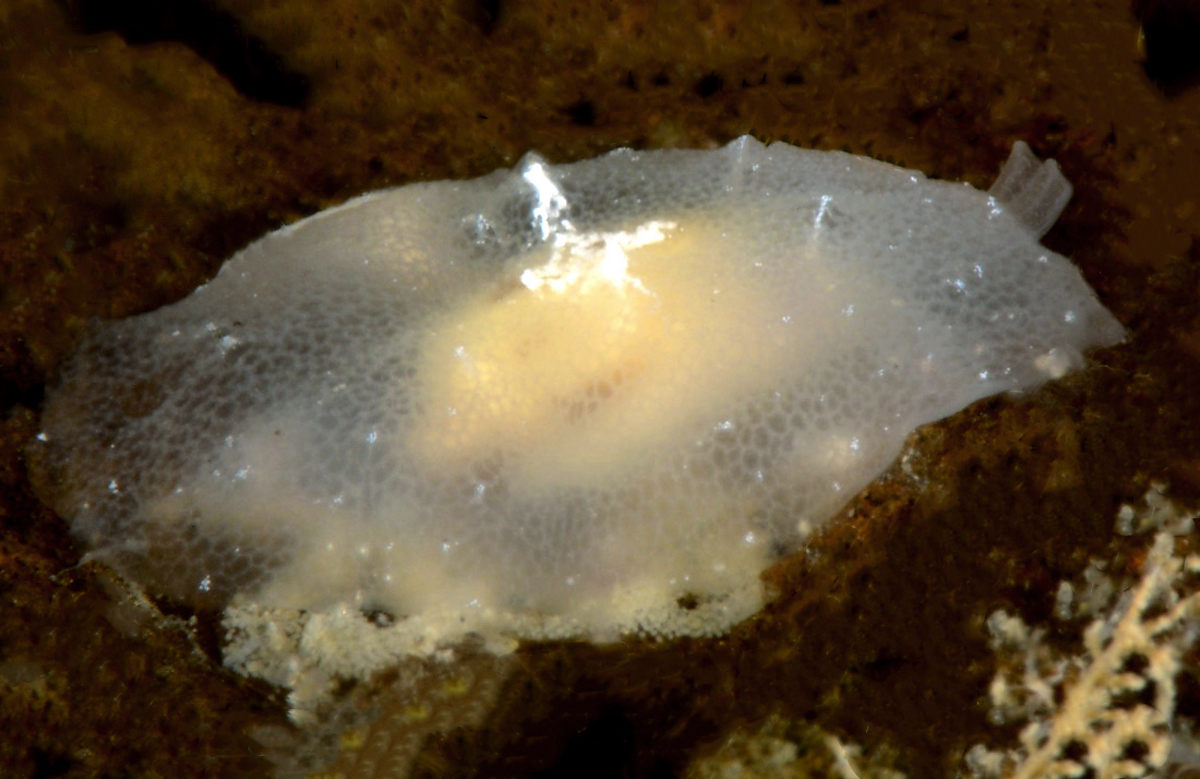

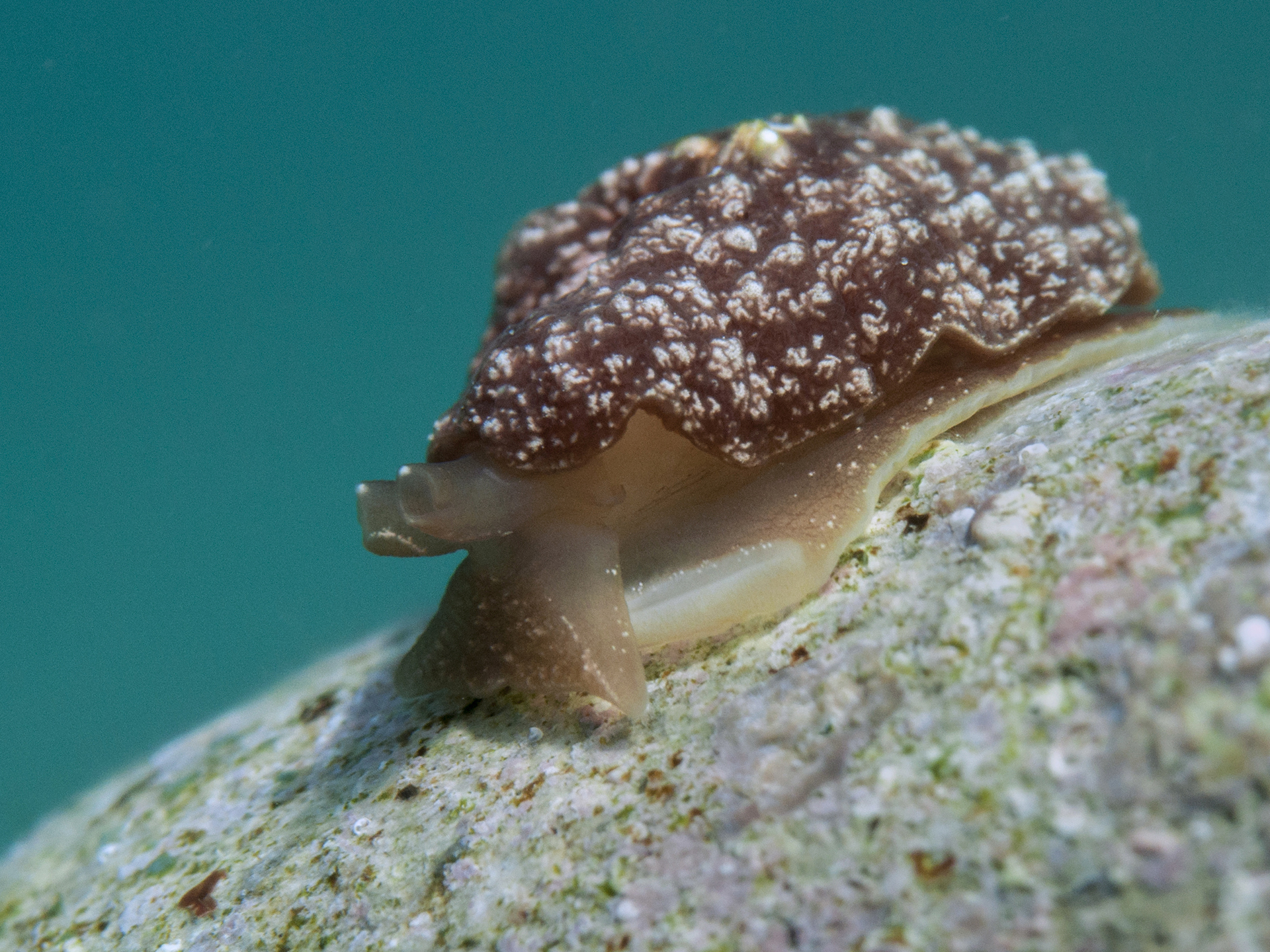

Scientific classification
- Domain: Eukaryota
- Kingdom: Animalia
- Phylum: Mollusca
- Class: Gastropoda
- Order: Pleurobranchida
- Family: Pleurobranchidae
- Genus: Berthella
- Species: B. stellata

Binomial name
- Berthella stellata (Risso, 1826)

Synonyms
- Pleurobranchus stellatus Risso, 1826

= Berthella stellata =

Species of sea slug

Berthella stellata is a species of sea slug in the family Pleurobranchidae. It is found in shallow water in the Mediterranean Sea, the western Atlantic Ocean and the tropical and subtropical Indo-Pacific region.

== Taxonomy ==
This sea slug was first described in 1826 by the French-Italian naturalist Antoine Risso. He gave it the name Pleurobranchus stellatus, but it has since been moved to the genus Berthella, becoming Berthella stellata. It has a very wide distributional range, and morphological studies and molecular evidence suggest that it is a species complex consisting of at least eight species. These form a monophyletic group if Berthella strongi from the eastern Pacific Ocean is included.

== Description ==
Berthella stellata is a slightly domed oval shape and can grow to a length of about 20 mm (0.8 in). It has a translucent whitish or golden-brown mantle through which the thin, flattened internal shell, and the brownish visceral mass can be seen. The rhinophores are tubular and divided along their length; they and the buccal membrane extend far beyond the foot and are the same colour as the rest of the animal. The mantle surface is finely reticulated with white lines surrounding low raised areas. In the centre of the dorsal surface is a white cross, with short white diagonal lines lying between the arms of the cross; these markings are more visible in young individuals, with older specimens often having only the diagonal lines.

== Distribution and habitat ==
First described from the Mediterranean Sea, this sea slug has been recorded under various names from around the world including from the western Indo-Pacific, Réunion, New Caledonia, Brazil, the Caribbean, the Red Sea, south-eastern Australia, Baja California, Hawaii, the Marshall Islands and Japan. It occurs on rock surfaces from the intertidal zone down to about 10 m (30 ft). It is nocturnal, and hides in crevices and under stones during the daytime.

== Ecology ==
Berthella stellata probably feeds by grazing on encrusting sponges in the family Oscarellidae. Scattered white spots on the surface of the mantle are glands that secrete acidic mucus to deter predators. This sea slug is a hermaphrodite, the genital openings being on the right side. A pair of slugs will orientate themselves so that the openings are in alignment, and fertilise each other. The eggs are laid in a whitish, coiled cylindrical, jelly-like ribbon about 15 mm (0.6 in) long.
