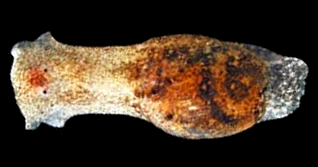
- live Haminoea sp.
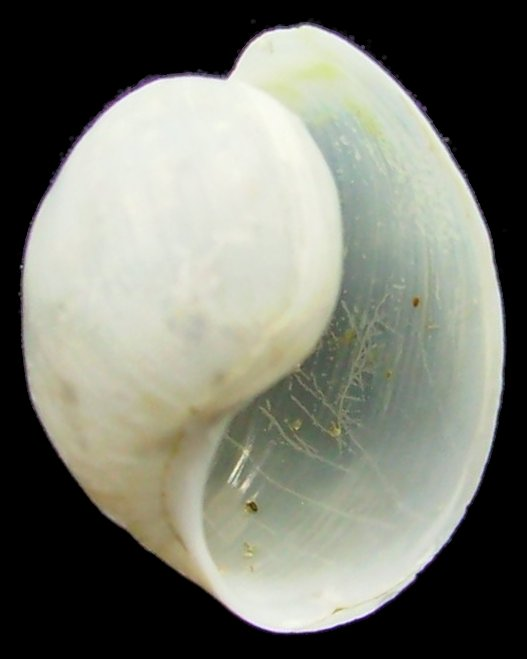
- A shell of Haminoea zelandiae

Scientific classification
- Kingdom: Animalia
- Phylum: Mollusca
- Class: Gastropoda
- Order: Cephalaspidea
- Superfamily: Haminoeoidea
- Family: Haminoeidae
- Genus: Haminoea; Turton & Kingston in Carrington, 1830

Type species
- Bulla hydatis Linnaeus, 1758

Synonyms
- Bulla (Haminea) [sic]; Bulla (Haminoea) W. Turton & Kingston, 1830; Haminaea Leach in Gray, 1847; Haminea [sic] (misspelling of Haminaea Leach in Gray, 1847)

= Haminoea =

Genus of gastropods

Haminoea is a genus of medium-sized sea snails or bubble snails, marine opisthobranch gastropod molluscs in the family Haminoeidae, the haminoea bubble snails, part of the clade Cephalaspidea, the headshield slugs and bubble snails.

== Systematics ==
Three different spellings (Haminoea, Haminea, Haminaea) were used for this genus over two hundred years. The ICZN finally made a decision that the correct spelling is Haminoea.

Oskars et al. (2019) restricted Haminoea to species from the Atlantic and eastern Pacific, and resurrected Haloa and Lamprohaminoea for Indo-Pacific species.

== Description ==
Many species within this genus have green algae growing on their shells. The posterior tip of the headshield is bilobed, except in Haminoea elegans.

== Species ==
Species within the genus Haminoea include:

- Haminoea ambigua (A. Adams, 1850)
- Haminoea antillarum d'Orbigny, 1841 - Antilles Glassy-bubble, Antilles Paper-bubble - Distribution: Florida, Caribbean, Brazil. Length: 12–20 mm.
  - Haminoea antillarum guadaloupensis Sowerby II, 1868 - Distribution : Florida, Cuba, Guadeloupe, Length: 12–18 mm, Description: globose shell with greenish yellow color, covered with longitudinal striae (= stripes); mantle with white to greenish background with small black dots.
- Haminoea binotata Pilsbry, 1895 (nomen dubium)
- Haminoea cyanocaudata Heller & Thompson, 1983
  - Description : translucent with green color (caused by growths of green algae), mottled with lightbrown spots, outlined in white, and darker brown dots; There can be a wide variation in the color pattern. This species is fairly uncommon, but, when found, it is always in large aggregations.
- Haminoea cymbiformis Carpenter, 1856
  - Distribution : Mexico
- Haminoea elegans Gray, 1825 Atlantic Elegant Paper Bubble; Elegant Glassy Bubble
  - Distribution : West Africa, Florida, Caribbean, Venezuela, Colombia, Brazil
  - Length : 23.5 mm
  - Description : found at depths up to 34 m; translucent mantle with patches of brown and black; posterior end of the headshield is not bilobed; shell with spiral grooves.
- Haminoea exigua Schaefer, 1992
- Haminoea fusari Alvarez, E.F.García, & Villani, 1993
- Haminoea glabra A. Adams, 1850
  - Distribution : Yucatán, Panama
  - Length : 4.3 mm
- Haminoea hydatis Linnaeus, 1758
  - Distribution : SW Britain, Ireland, France and south to the Mediterranean, Madeira and Canaries; Ascension Island, St. Helena, west coast of Africa
  - Length : 8–30 mm (shell : 15 mm)
  - Description : fragile shell hidden by the mantle and parapodial lobes in crawling animals. Herbivorous swimming dark brown snail found on muddy sands, shell grit and algae fields, down to unknown depths.
- Haminoea maray Galvão Filho, P. Lima & Simone, 2024

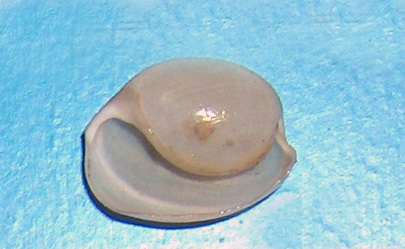
shell of Haminoea navicula

- Haminoea natalensis (Krauss, 1848)
- Haminoea navicula da Costa, 1778 - Distribution: SW Britain, south to the Mediterranean, Ascension Island, St. Helena; Atlantic and Mediterranean costas of France and Spain; Black Sea, Length: up to 70 mm (shell: 32 mm), Description: larger species, with heavier and darker-white shell; cephalic shield with short tentacular processes at front. Found on muddy sands especially among Eelgrass, Zostera marina. Does not swim. This species is able to change its color to correspond with its environment. The color pigments (or melanophores) in the skin can be obscured. The skin color can change in this way from dark brown to white in four to five hours. (Edlinger, Malacologia 22; 1982)
- Haminoea orbignyana A. de Férussac, 1822
  - Distribution : France to West Africa; Mediterranean, Eastern Atlantic
  - Length : 7 mm
- Haminoea orteai F. G. García Talavera, Murillo, & Templado, 1987
  - Distribution : Southern Spain
- Haminoea padangensis Thiele, 1825 Padang’s Delicate Bubble
  - Distribution : West-Pacific
  - Length : 11 mm
- Haminoea peruviana d'Orbigny, 1842
  - Distribution : Peru
  - Length : 11 mm
- Haminoea petitii d'Orbigny, 1841 Straight Glassy-bubble
  - Distribution: Caribbean, Florida, Colombia, Brazil
  - Length : 12 mm
- Haminoea solitaria T. Say, 1822 Solitary Glassy-bubble, Say’s Paper-bubble, Solitary Paper-bubble: synonym of Haminella solitaria (Say, 1822) (unaccepted combination)
  - Distribution : Canada, Massachusetts to Florida
  - Length : 8–19 mm
  - Description : common bubble snail; oblong smooth shell; bluish-white to yellowish-brown.
- Haminoea succinea (T.A. Conrad, 1846) Amber Glassy-bubble
  - Distribution : caribbean, Florida, Colombia, Venezuela, Bermuda
  - Length : 12 mm
- Haminoea templadoi Garcia, Perez-Hurtado & Garcia-Gomez, 1991
- Haminoea vesicula A. A. Gould, 1855 Blister Glassy-bubble, White Paper-bubble, Gould’s Paper-bubble
  - Distribution : West America, Alaska, Gulf of California, Mexico
  - Length : 19 mm
  - Description : common on muddy flats and on eelgrass; the middle posterior part of the cephalic shield has an indent; brown or greenish-yellowy shell; large, barrel-shaped body whorl covered by a rust periostracum; involute (= sunken) spire; long aperture; outer lip gradually increasing in width; the snail cannot retract completely into its shell.
- Haminoea virescens Sowerby, 1833 Green Glassy-bubble, Green Paper-bubble, Sowerby’s Paper-bubble
  - Distribution : Northwestern America from Puget Sound (Seattle) to Gulf of California.
  - Length : 13–19 mm
  - Description : Thin, fragile shell is ovate and yellowish-green; involute (= sunken) spire, with small perforation; body whorl with longitudinal growth ridges and minute grooves; large aperture; thin outer lip
- Haminoea wallisi Gray, 1825
  - Distribution : Australia
  - Distribution : New Zealand
  - Length : 30 mm (shell : 20 mm)
  - Description : very common; translucent snail with variable coloring, going from pale color with black dots, to a uniform black color; broad headshield; parapodia fold up and envelop most of the shell; thin, ovate translucent shell.

Species brought into synonymy

- Haminoea alfredensis P. Bartsch, 1915: synonym of Haminoea natalensis (Krauss, 1848) (probable synonym)
- Haminoea angelensis F. Baker & G. D. Hanna, 1927 - Distribution: Gulf of California, Mexico, Length: 7 mm: synonym of Haminoea vesicula (A. Gould, 1855)
- Haminoea angusta Gould, 1859:synonym of Cylichnatys angusta (Gould, 1859)
- Haminoea callidegenita (Gibson & Chia, 1989):synonym of Haminoea japonica Pilsbry, 1895 Distribution: West America, Description: has a deeply bifurcate headshield.
- Haminoea cornea (Lamarck, 1822):synonym of Haminoea navicula (da Costa, 1778)
- Haminoea crocata Pease, 1860:synonym of Haloa crocata (Pease, 1860)
- Haminoea curta A. Adams, 1850: synonym of Liloa curta (A. Adams, 1850)
- Haminoea cymbalum Quoy & Gaimard, 1833:synonym of Lamprohaminoea cymbalum (Quoy & Gaimard, 1833)
- Haminoea cymoelium Monterosato, 1917:synonym of Haminoea hydatis (Linnaeus, 1758)
- Haminoea cyanomarginata Heller & Thompson, 1983:synonym of Lamprohaminoea cyanomarginata (Heller & Thompson, 1983)
- Haminoea flavescens (A. Adams, 1850): synonym of Haloa japonica (Pilsbry, 1895)
- Haminoea fusca Pease, 1863: synonym of Haloa japonica (Pilsbry, 1895)
  - Distribution : Indo-Pacific
  - Length : 25 mm
  - Description : color of the shell : varies from greenish to brown, and light purple.
- Haminoea galba W. H. Pease, 1861: synonym of Haloa crocata (Pease, 1860) (junior subjective synonym)
  - Distribution : Indo Pacific
- Haminoea grisea E.A. Smith, 1875:synonym of Cylichna alba (Brown, 1827)
- Haminoea japonica Pilsbry, 1895: synonym of Haloa japonica (Pilsbry, 1895)
- Haminoea margaritoides Kuroda & Habe, 1971 - Distribution: Japan, Length: 7 mm: synonym of Haloa japonica (Pilsbry, 1895)
- Haminoea maugeansis Burn, 1966:synonym of Papawera maugeansis (Burn, 1966)
- Haminoea ovalis Pease, 1868:synonym of Haloa ovalis (Pease, 1868)
- Haminoea petersi (Martens, 1879): synonym of Haloa petersi (E. von Martens, 1879)
- Haminoea taylorae E. J. Petuch, 1987:synonym of Haminoea elegans (Gray, 1825)
- Haminoea tenella (A. Adams in Sowerby, 1850): synonym of Haloa pemphis (R. A. Philippi, 1847)
- Haminoea tenera A. Adams, 1850: synonym of Haloa constricta (A. Adams, 1850)
  - Distribution : Australia
- Haminoea zelandiae Gray, 1843:synonym of Papawera zelandiae (Gray, 1843)
