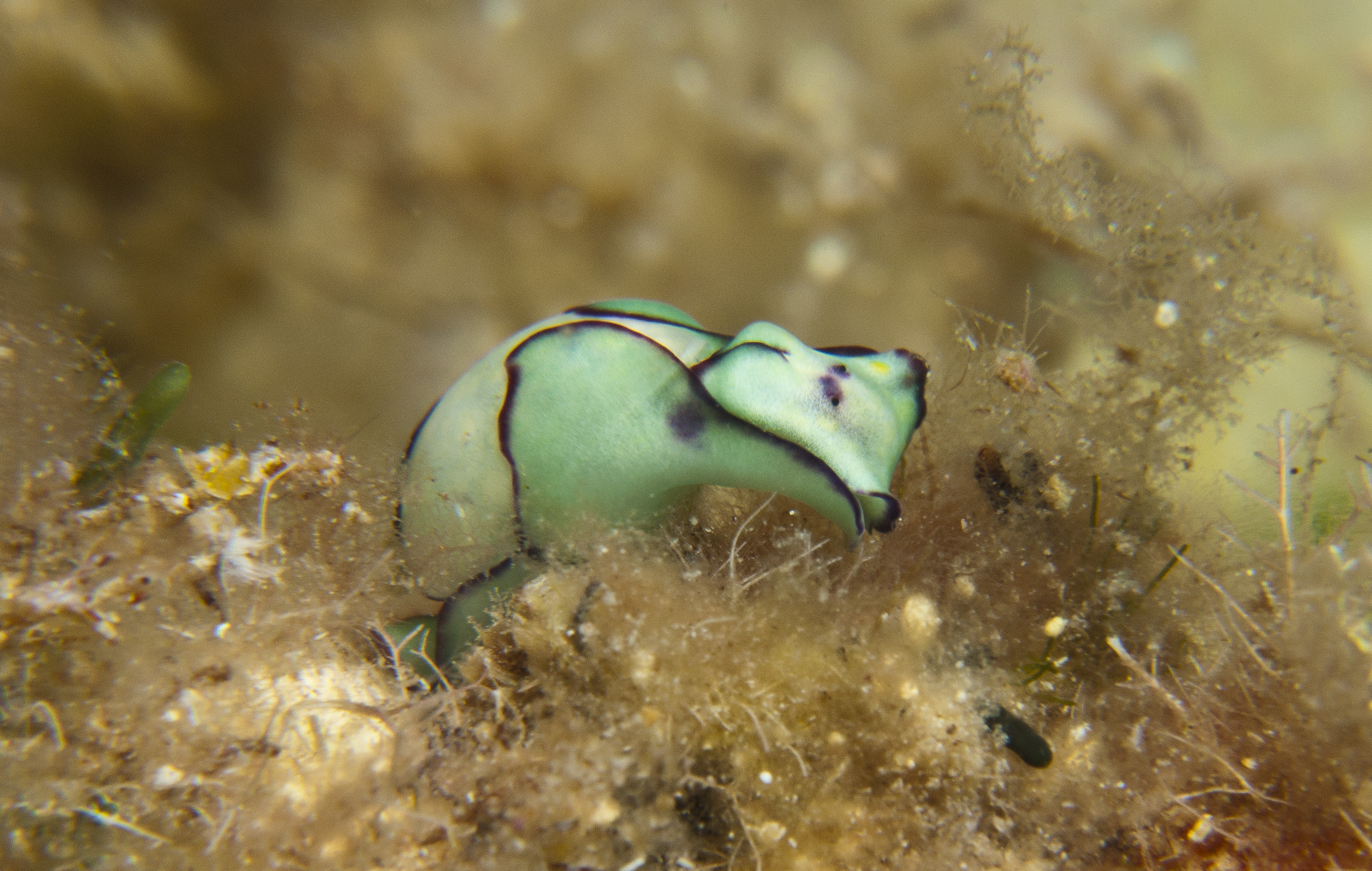
- Live Haminoea cyanomarginata in situ

Scientific classification
- Kingdom: Animalia
- Phylum: Mollusca
- Class: Gastropoda
- Infraclass: Euthyneura
- Subterclass: Tectipleura
- Order: Cephalaspidea
- Superfamily: Haminoeoidea; Pilsbry, 1895

Families
- See text

= Haminoeoidea =

Superfamily of gastropods

Haminoeoidea is a taxonomic superfamily of small sea snails or bubble shells, marine opisthobranch gastropod mollusks in the clade Cephalaspidea, the headshield slugs and bubble snails.

These cephalaspideans do have distinct anatomical and morphological characteristics, but many species were described only from empty shells. For proper clarification of the taxonomy, those species still need the research necessary to provide a good description of the external and internal anatomy of the living animal.

== Description of live animal ==
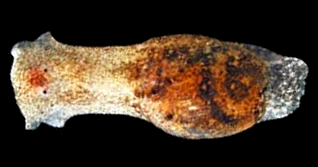
Live Haminoea sp.

The soft parts of the animals can retract completely or partially into their shells, and yet this offers them scant protection, because the aperture is rather wide and there is no operculum. Furthermore, the shell is very fragile and can easily be crushed by a predator.

The cephalic shield of most species in this superfamily has two hind lobes that lie back on the front of the shell. The black eyes are usually buried just beneath the surface of the head.

== Shell description ==
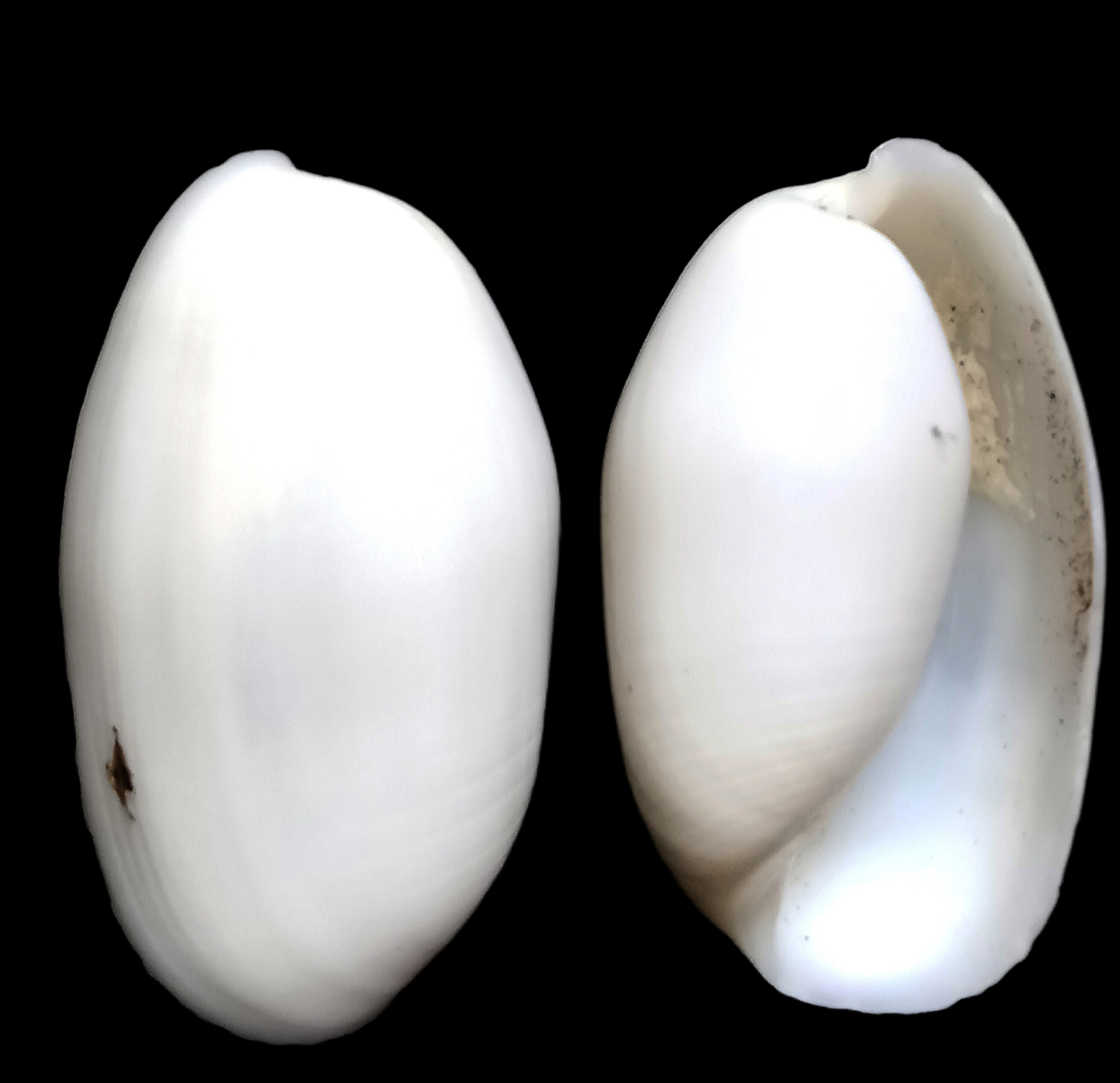

These bubble snails have thin, inflated shells ranging in shape from ovoid to flat and oval. They have an involute (sunken) spire.

== Habitat ==
One can often find these bubble snails in enormous numbers, burrowing in mud on intertidal and sublittoral beds of green algae such as for example, the sea lettuce, Ulva lactuca.

== Feeding habits ==
Haminoeid bubble snails are mostly herbivorous.

== Predators ==
Their predators include species of carnivorous aglajids such as Navanax inermis.

== Families, genera, species ==
Families, genera and species within the Haminoeoidea include:

- Superfamily Haminoeoidea
  - Family Haminoeidae
  - Family Bullactidae Thiele, 1926: synonym of Haminoeidae Pilsbry, 1895
    - Genus Bullacta Bergh, 1901
      - Bullacta exarata Philippi, 1848 – Distribution: China, Yellow Sea, Indo-Pacific
  - Family Smaragdinellidae Thiele, 1925 – Oval yellow-green shell with sunken spire; very large aperture.
    - Genus Phanerophthalmus A. Adams, 1850
      - Phanerophthalmus cylindricus (Pease, 1861) – Distribution: Indo-Pacific, Hawaii
      - Phanerophthalmus smaragdinus Ruppell & Leuckart, 1828 – Distribution: tropical Indo-West Pacific, Hawaii – Length: 16 mm – Description: herbivore with a rather small cephalic shield; small enclosed mantle cavity ending in an exhalant siphon; small shell is partially enclosed in the mantle; color: brown to purple.
    - Genus Smaragdinella A. Adams & Reeve, 1848: synonym of Haminoeidae Pilsbry, 1895
      - Smaragdinella algirae Forbes, 1844
      - Smaragdinella calyculata Broderip & Sowerby 1829 – Distribution: Japan, Indo-Pacific – Length: 8 mm – Description: green mantle with dark green spots
      - Smaragdinella sieboldii A. Adams, 1864
