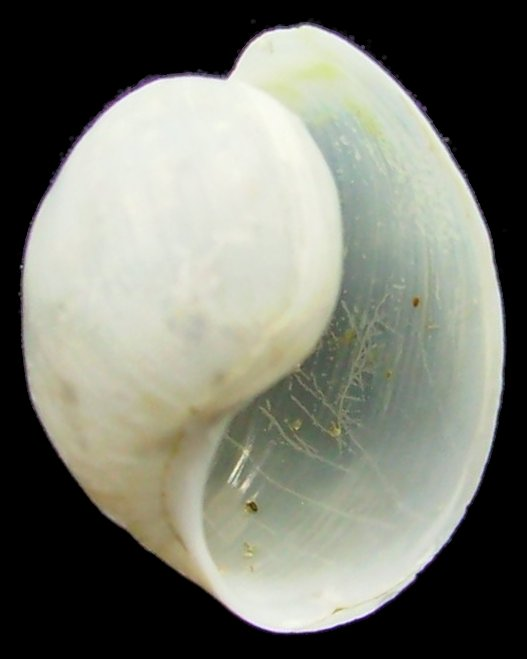

Scientific classification
- Kingdom: Animalia
- Phylum: Mollusca
- Class: Gastropoda
- Order: Cephalaspidea
- Family: Haminoeidae
- Genus: Papawera
- Species: P. zelandiae

Binomial name
- Papawera zelandiae (Gray, 1843)

= Papawera zelandiae =

White bubble shell

Species of gastropod

Papawera zelandiae, common name the white bubble shell, is a species of medium-sized sea snail or bubble snail, a marine opisthobranch gastropod mollusc in the family Haminoeidae, the bubble snails.

== Systematics ==
The white bubble shell was in the past classified in the genus Haminoea. However, Oskars et al. (2019) placed this species and Haminoea maugeansis in the new genus Papawera after DNA-based cladistic analysis found both species closely related to Smaragdinella.
