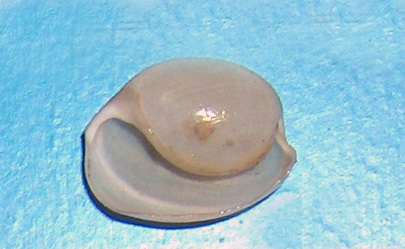

Scientific classification
- Kingdom: Animalia
- Phylum: Mollusca
- Class: Gastropoda
- Order: Cephalaspidea
- Family: Haminoeidae
- Genus: Haminoea
- Species: H. navicula

Binomial name
- Haminoea navicula (da Costa, 1778)

= Haminoea navicula =

Species of gastropod

Haminoea navicula is a species of gastropod belonging to the family Haminoeidae.

The species is found in Western Europe and Mediterranean.
