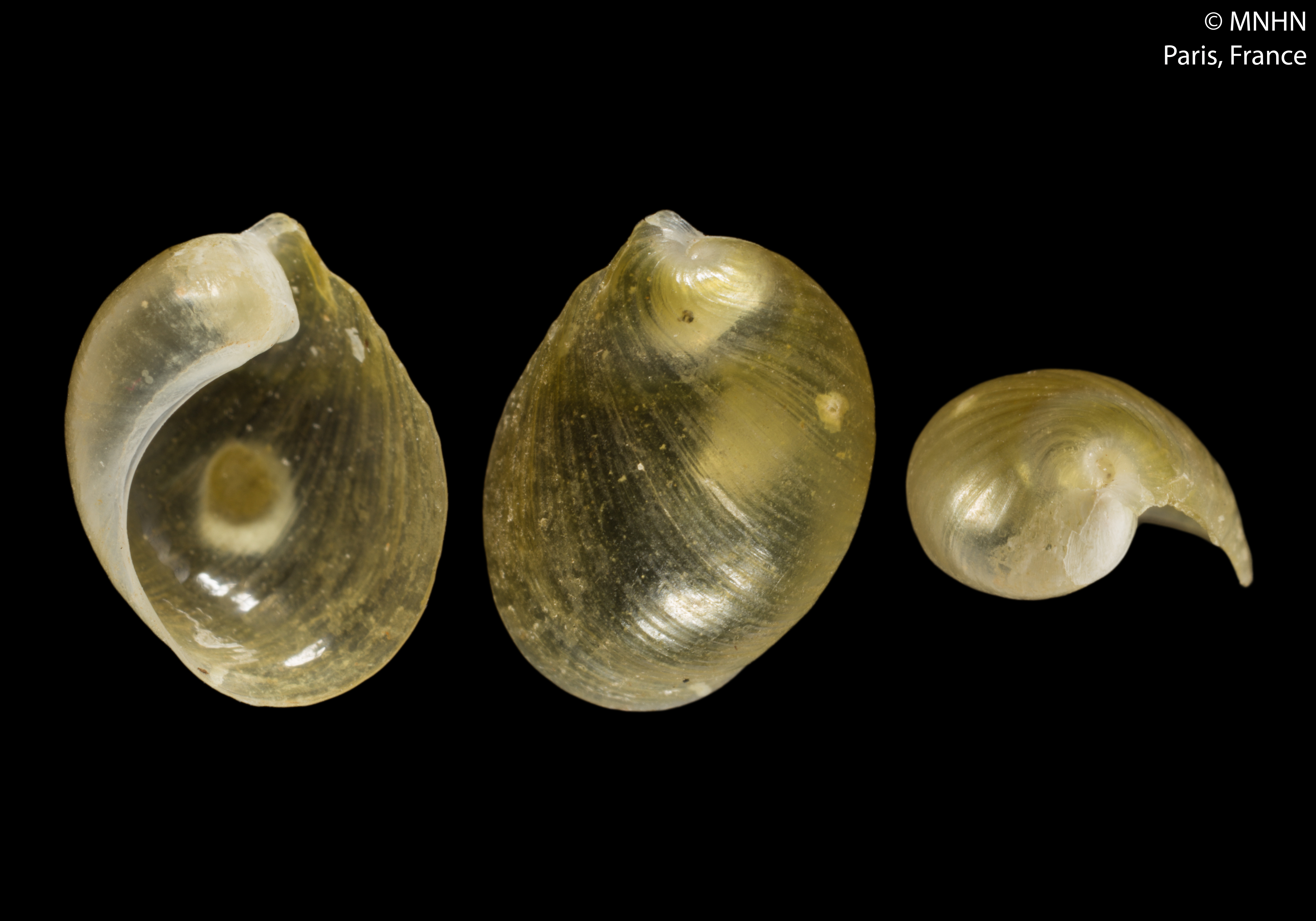
- Shell of Smaragdinella fragilis (holotype at MNHN, Paris)

Scientific classification
- Kingdom: Animalia
- Phylum: Mollusca
- Class: Gastropoda
- Order: Cephalaspidea
- Family: Haminoeidae
- Genus: Smaragdinella
- Species: S. fragilis

Binomial name
- Smaragdinella fragilis Bozzetti, 2008

= Smaragdinella fragilis =

Species of gastropod

Smaragdinella fragilis is a species of sea snail, a bubble snail, a marine gastropod mollusc in the family Haminoeidae.

The scientific name of the species was first published in 2008 by Bozzetti.

== Description ==
The length of the shell attains 7.4 mm.

== Distribution ==
This marine species occurs off Madagascar.
