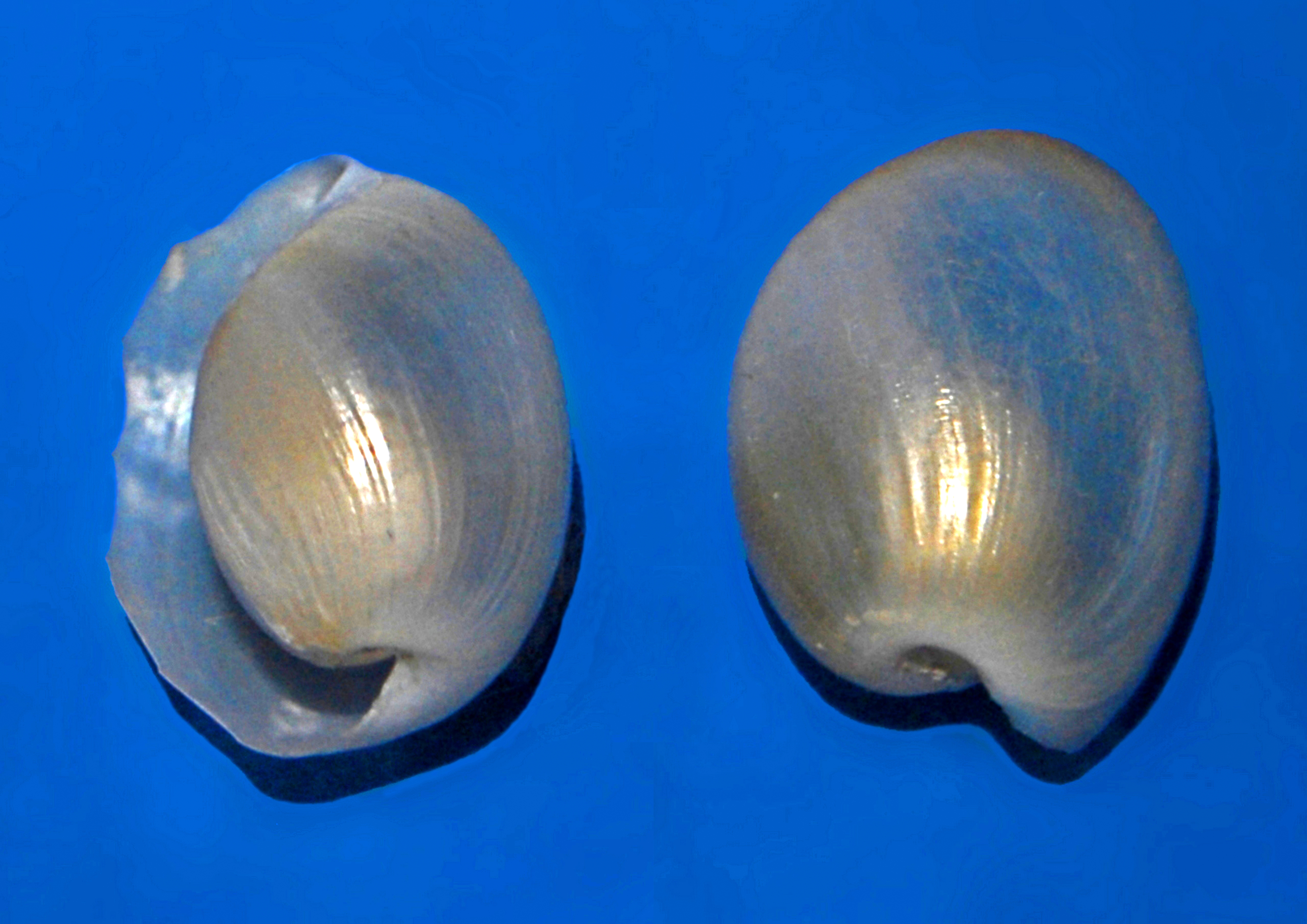
- Shells of Haminoea hydatis from Veneto, Italy at the Museo Civico di Storia Naturale di Milano

Scientific classification
- Kingdom: Animalia
- Phylum: Mollusca
- Class: Gastropoda
- Order: Cephalaspidea
- Family: Haminoeidae
- Genus: Haminoea
- Species: H. hydaatis

Binomial name
- Haminoea hydaatis Linnaeus, 1758

Synonyms
- Bulla hydatis Linnaeus, 1758; Haminoea cymoelium Monterosato, 1917

= Haminoea hydatis =

Species of gastropod

Haminoea hydatis is a species of sea snail or bubble snail, a marine opisthobranch gastropod mollusc in the family Haminoeidae, one of the families of bubble snails.

== Description ==
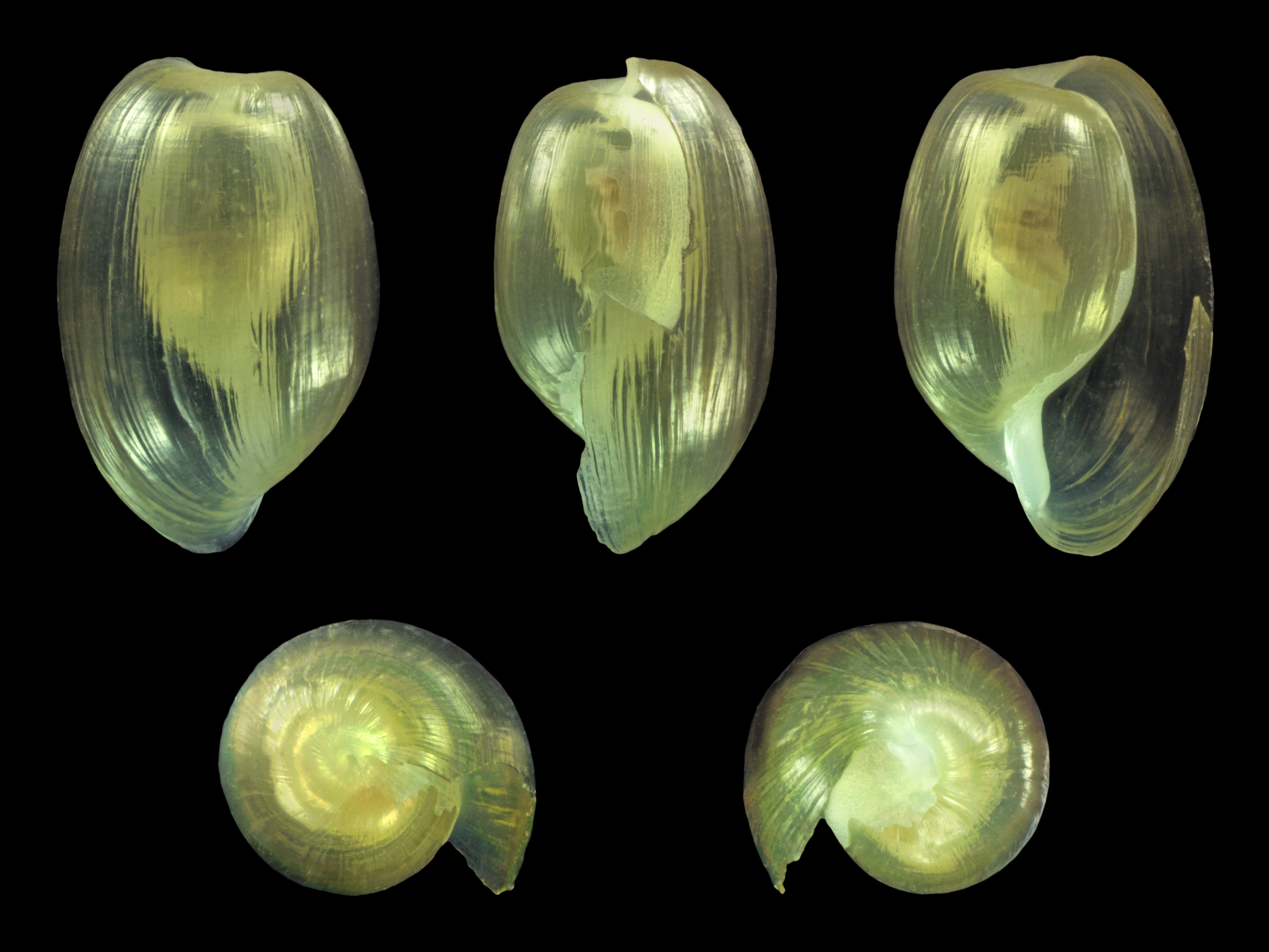
Haminoea hydatis cymoelia

An adult Haminoea hydatis can be as long as 8–30 millimetres (0.31–1.18 in), while the shell reaches a length of 8–23 millimetres (0.31–0.91 in). It is a fragile, inflated, oblong shell partially hidden by the mantle and parapodial lobes in crawling animals. These herbivorous swimming snails are dark brown.

== Distribution and habitat ==
This species is present in SW Britain, Ireland, France and south to the Mediterranean, Madeira and Canaries; Ascension Island, St. Helena and west coast of Africa. These snails live on muddy sands, shell grit and algae fields.
