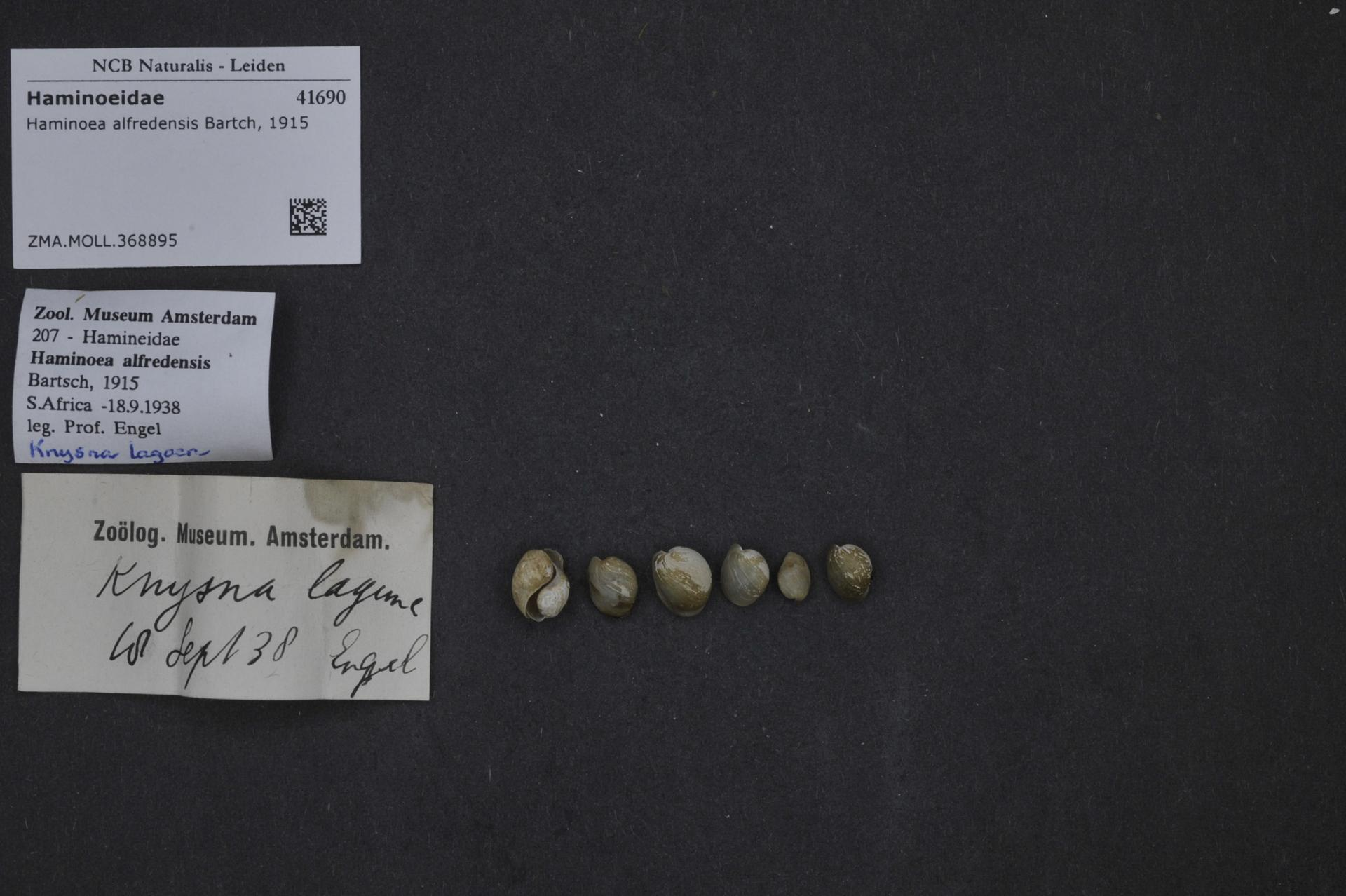

Scientific classification
- Kingdom: Animalia
- Phylum: Mollusca
- Class: Gastropoda
- Order: Cephalaspidea
- Family: Haminoeidae
- Genus: Haminoea
- Species: H. natalensis

Binomial name
- Haminoea natalensis Bartsch, 1915

= Haminoea natalensis =

Species of marine opisthobranch mollusc from South Africa

Haminoea natalensis, common name the South African bubble snail, is a species of sea snail or bubble snail, a marine opisthobranch gastropod mollusc in the family Haminoeidae, one of the families of bubble snails.

== Taxonomy ==
The species was first described by Paul Bartsch in 1915

Oskars and Malaquias 2020 found that the original description of Haminoea natalensis shows a shell with longitudinal growth lines and a large anterior aperture, which is a close match to H. alfredensis. Due to this Oskars and Malaquias considered H. natalensis as a potential senior synonym of H. alfredensis. However, the authors refrained form synonymising the names due to the type shells of H. natalensis being lost, and due to the name of the name being mostly connected to Pacific haminoeids of the genus Haloa Pilsbry, 1921 mainly the species now known as Haloa wallisii.

The name of this species will be in question until it is properly revised.

The editors of World Register of Marine Species and Molluscabase has decided on considering Haminoea alfredensis a junior synonym of H. natalensis.

== Distribution ==
The South African bubble shell is endemic to temperate waters off the coast of South Africa.

== Description ==
Haminoea alfredensis has a length of 9–17 mm, and it has a broad radular ribbon with about 40 teeth in each half row. The color of this species is translucent green, dotted with yellow to orange spots.
