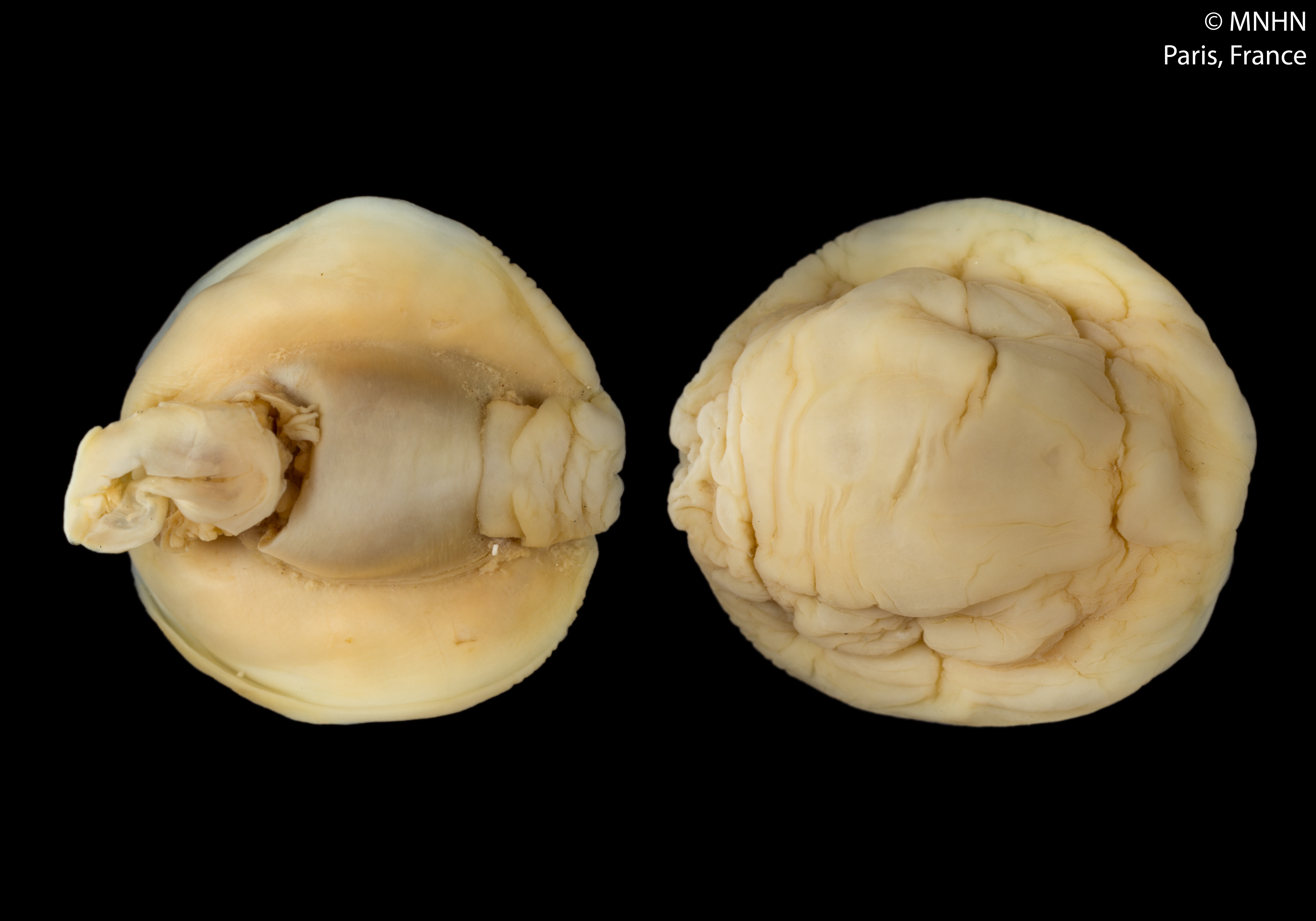
- Shell of Phanerophthalmus luteus (syntype at MNHN, Paris)

Scientific classification
- Kingdom: Animalia
- Phylum: Mollusca
- Class: Gastropoda
- Order: Cephalaspidea
- Superfamily: Haminoeoidea
- Family: Haminoeidae
- Genus: Phanerophthalmus; A. Adams, 1850

Type species
- Bulla lutea Quoy & Gaimard, 1833

Synonyms
- Cryptophthalmus Ehrenberg, 1828 (invalid: junior homonym of Cryptophthalmus Rafinesque, 1814 [Crustacea]; Lathophthalmus is a replacement name); Lathophthalmus Pruvot-Fol, 1932; Xanthonella Gray, 1850

= Phanerophthalmus =

Genus of gastropods

Phanerophthalmus is a genus of medium-sized sea snails or bubble snails, marine opisthobranch gastropod molluscs in the family Haminoeidae, the haminoea bubble snails, part of the clade Cephalaspidea, the headshield slugs and bubble snails.

== Characteristics ==
The body is elongated and rounded. The head is grooved down the middle and features rounded lobes at the sides, while the posterior appendages are very short. The eyes are located on the upper surface of the head; they are small, black, and set wide apart. The sides of the foot are folded over the back, leaving an undulating fissure between them that slopes slightly toward the posterior section.

The shell is concealed within the interior of the back, positioned above the gills. It is oval in shape and entirely open, lacking any trace of a spire other than a curved process on the left border; meanwhile, the right border is prolonged into a point that is slightly turned upon itself.

== Species ==
- Phanerophthalmus albocollaris Heller & T. E. Thompson, 1983
- Phanerophthalmus albotriangulatus Austin, Gosliner & Malaquias, 2018
- Phanerophthalmus anettae Austin, Gosliner & Malaquias, 2018
- Phanerophthalmus batangas Austin, Gosliner & Malaquias, 2018
- Phanerophthalmus boucheti Austin, Gosliner & Malaquias, 2018
- Phanerophthalmus cerverai Austin, Gosliner & Malaquias, 2018
- Phanerophthalmus cylindricus (Pease, 1861)
- Phanerophthalmus engeli (Labbé, 1934)
- Phanerophthalmus lentigines Austin, Gosliner & Malaquias, 2018
- Phanerophthalmus luteus (Quoy & Gaimard, 1833)
- Phanerophthalmus minikoiensis (E. A. Smith, 1903)
- Phanerophthalmus olivaceus (Ehrenberg, 1828)
- Phanerophthalmus paulayi Austin, Gosliner & Malaquias, 2018
- Phanerophthalmus perpallidus Risbec, 1928
- Phanerophthalmus purpura Austin, Gosliner & Malaquias, 2018
- Phanerophthalmus rudmani Austin, Gosliner & Malaquias, 2018
- Phanerophthalmus tibiricae Austin, Gosliner & Malaquias, 2018

Synonyms

- Phanerophthalmus albotriangulatum Austin, Gosliner & Malaquias, 2018: synonym of Phanerophthalmus albotriangulatus Austin, Gosliner & Malaquias, 2018 (wrong gender agreement of specific epithet)
- Phanerophthalmus collaris Eales, 1938: synonym of Phanerophthalmus minikoiensis (E. A. Smith, 1903) (uncertain synonym)
- Phanerophthalmus pauper Bergh, 1905: synonym of Phanerophthalmus luteus (Quoy & Gaimard, 1833)
- Phanerophthalmus smaragdinus (Rüppell & Leuckart, 1830): synonym of Phanerophthalmus olivaceus (Ehrenberg, 1828)
