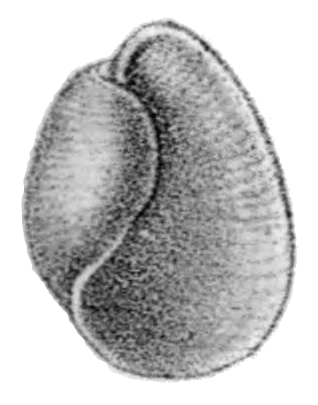
- Drawing of apertural view of a shell of Bullacta exarata

Scientific classification
- Kingdom: Animalia
- Phylum: Mollusca
- Class: Gastropoda
- (unranked): clade Heterobranchia clade Euopisthobranchia clade Cephalaspidea
- Family: Haminoeidae
- Genus: Bullacta Bergh, 1901
- Species: B. exarata

Binomial name
- Bullacta exarata (Philippi, 1849)

Synonyms
- Atyscaphander Annandale, 1924; Sinohaminea Tchang, 1933; Bullaea caurina Benson, 1856; Bullaea exarata Philippi, 1849; Haminoea sinensis A. Adams, 1850; Sinohaminea tsangkouensis Tchang, 1933

= Bullacta exarata =

Species of gastropod

Bullacta exarata, common name the yellow mud snail, is a species of a sea snail or bubble snail, a marine gastropod mollusc in the family Haminoeidae, the bubble snails.

Bullacta exarata is a commercially important mollusc which is used as a food item in eastern China.

== Taxonomy ==
Bullacta exarata is the only species in the genus Bullacta. cf.

Bullacta is the type genus of the family Bullactidae Thiele, 1926, as shown in the taxonomy of the Gastropoda by Bouchet & Rocroi (2005).

Based on phylogenetic genetic analysis by Malaquias (2010), Bullacta exarata should be placed in the family Haminoeidae.

== Distribution ==
Bullacta exarata is endemic to coastlines of the South and East China Seas from Hainan to the Bohai Sea in north-eastern China, the western coast and south coast of Korea and Japan. An ecotype of this snail introduced from further south has become invasive in Laizhou Bay, with population densities of over 160 snails per square meter.

== Description ==
The shell is bullate, fairly thick, white, spirally striate, with a well-developed periostracum. There is no spire and no umbilicus. The columella is smooth and simple. The aperture extends for the whole length of the shell, and is narrower above than below. The apertural lip extends upwards beyond the apex of the shell.

The height of the shell is 8 mm and the width of the shell is 6 mm.

The animal cannot withdraw itself into the shell, which contains the visceral hump only. The cephalic disc is large and slipper-shaped, feebly emarginate on the dorsal surface behind and with a narrow free margin.

The cephalic disc, which is rounded in front, occupies about half of the whole bulk in a contracted state. The edge of the mantle is smooth, without processes of any kind. It, the edge of the mantle (which is slightly retroverted over that of the shell), the foot and the epipodia are (in alcohol) of a pale green colour. The greater part of the mantle, however, under the shell is colourless and transparent. The foot is short, truncate before and behind, and with the epipodia (in much contracted specimens) apparently not well developed. The eyes are minute and quite invisible on the surface. The eyespots are deeply sunk in the tissues. The gill, which is situated far back on the right side, is large and consists of a considerable number of fleshly lobes.

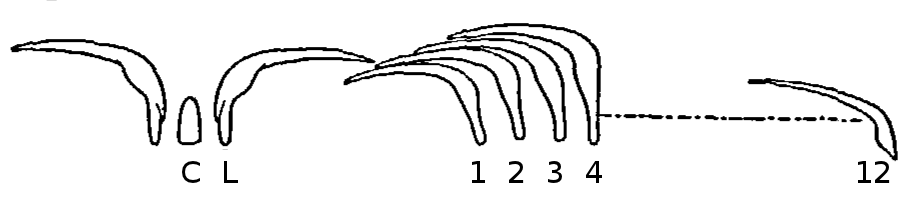
Drawing of one row of teeth in the radula of Bullacta exarata. C - central tooth, L - lateral tooth, 1-12 - marginal teeth.

Digestive system: The mouth is a minute transverse slit in the front of the cephalic disc. The jaws are large, but imperfectly cornified. The jaws are angular and minutely, irregularly serrate. They are composed of numerous minute prismatic rods. On the margin many of these rods are transverse and project slightly, forming a minute serration. The radular sack is small. The radula has the formula 12.1.1.1.12. The central tooth is a simple flat triangular plate. The single lateral tooth is well differentiated from the marginal teeth, from which it is separated by a considerable space, and points in the opposite direction. The marginal teeth are slender, elongate, curved rod-like bodies somewhat expanded at the base. They decrease in size gradually from the second or third marginal, which is slightly larger than the first, outwards.

There is a long, narrow, thin-walled oesophagus with a single coil; before entering the muscular gizzard it is considerably dilated. A longitudinal strand of muscular tissue runs up its dorsal surface for a short distance from the gizzard. The gizzard is large and it contains three horn-shaped, transversely ridged chitinous plates arranged in a triangle. It is maintained in position by a stout transverse muscle on either side, the proximal end of the muscle being fixed to a constriction in the outer wall of the gizzard. The gizzard contains three large, stout chitinous bodies, which are smooth and heart-shaped at their base on its external surface. Internally they are convex, curved and tapering, with stout, somewhat serrate reversed V-shaped transverse ridges. The intestine after leaving the gizzard bears three small, almost spherical, diverticula, one behind the base of each of the chitinous plates. The wall of the intestine is thin and its structure simple; it has a single closely adpressed bend.

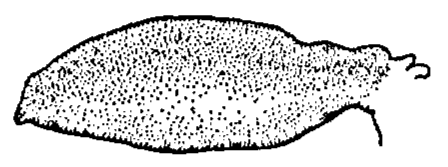
Drawing of penis-sack of Bullacta exarata.

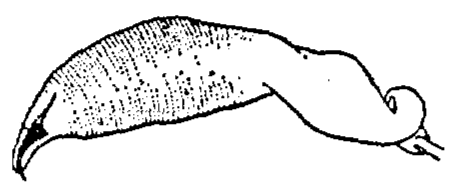
Drawing of penis extracted from the sack.

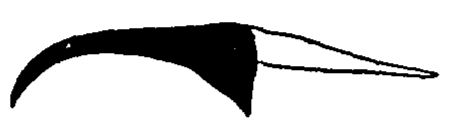
Drawing of stylet extracted from the penis.

Reproductive system: The male intromittent organ is provided with an elongate chitinous stylet. The penis is enclosed in an oval sack. When extracted therefrom it is an almost cylindrical organ with two coils, or constrictions, in its course, bluntly pointed at the apex and much contracted proximally. Its walls are highly muscular, but all the muscles are longitudinal and there is no circular muscular bulb. Its outstanding feature is the presence of a long, slender, sharply pointed, scimitar-shaped, black, horny stylet with a saddle-shaped base which is sometimes prolonged into a long, sharply pointed spur. In some individuals, however, the spur is completely absent.

The female genitalia include a well-developed uterus but no spermatheca. The hermaphrodite gland is small in immature specimen.

Nervous system: The central nervous system closely resembles that of Aliculastrum cylindricum.

== Ecology ==
The habitat for this species includes intertidal flats, including the supratidal zone and subtidal zone.

Bullacta exarata is a hermaphroditic species.

Its life cycle has been extensively studied:

- Vitellogenesis (Ying & Yang, 2001)
- Oogenesis (Ying, 2002)
- Spermatogenesis (Ying et al., 2002)
- Reproductive system (Ying et al., 2002)
- Spermatozoa (Ying et al., 2004)

Bullacta exarata feeds on diatoms. It is an important consumer in the tidal flat ecosystem.

Bacteria identified in the digestive system of Bullacta exarata include the genera Photobacterium, Bacillus, Pseudomonas, Vibrio, some genera from the family Enterobacteriaceae and others.

According to the measurement of hygienic indicator bacteria Escherichia coli in 2001, the meat of Bullacta exarata meets national standards (3 cells of Escherichia coli in one gram of fresh meat) in Shanghai province and in most of Zhejiang province.

Heavy metals in the tissues of Bullacta exarata from the Yangtze Estuary were measured by Lu et al. in 2001. In Shanghai, the coast is seriously polluted and measured pollutants in the meat of Bullacta exarata were in 2003 as follows:

- 20.70 mg of petroleum hydrocarbons in one kg of wet weight (exceeds grade I of biological standard)
- 13.10 mg of zinc in one kg of wet weight
- 33.60 mg of copper in one kg of wet weight (exceeds grade II of biological standard)

== Human use ==
Bullacta exarata
Nutritional value per 100 g (3.5 oz)
- Fat: 0.94 g
- Polyunsaturated omega−3: 600 mg
- ^{†}Percentages estimated using US recommendations for adults.

Bullacta exarata is a commercially important mollusc in eastern China. Common names in Mandarin Chinese include Tutie (Chinese: 吐铁; pinyin: Tǔtiě) and Niluo (Chinese: 泥螺; pinyin: Níluó). It is exported as a food source to Hong Kong, Macau, Taiwan and to Southeast Asia. It is also used in traditional Chinese medicine and there were isolated various compounds with pharmacological activities from Bullacta exarata.

Mass mortalities of Bullacta exarata in Zhejiang in 1995 caused economic losses. The species is being cultivated in mariculture, especially in Zhejiang Province, where there was a cultivated area of 8,000 ha in 1999.

For example, Bullacta exarata was the main farming species at the farming area of about 10 100 mu (6.73266 km^{2}) in the Cixi City, with an estimated annual output of 15 million RMB.

Bullacta exarata has high nutrition value. There is high amount of omega-3 fatty acids in the canned meat of Bullacta exarata (there is 600 mg of eicosapentaenoic acid in 100 g of meat).
