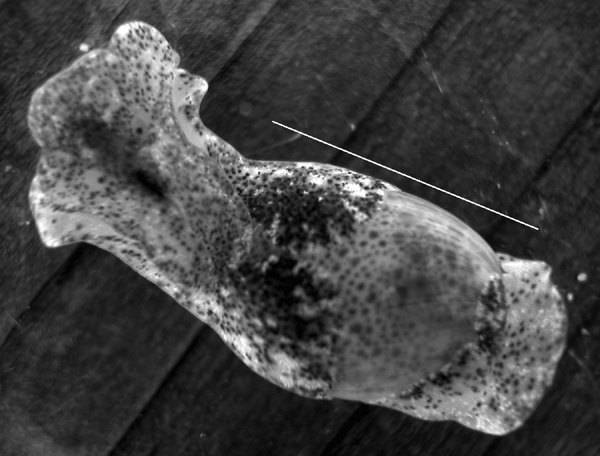
- A live individual, head end at the upper left, scale bar 11 mm

Scientific classification
- Kingdom: Animalia
- Phylum: Mollusca
- Class: Gastropoda
- Order: Cephalaspidea
- Family: Haminoeidae
- Genus: Haloa
- Species: H. japonica

Binomial name
- Haloa japonica (Pilsbry, 1895)

Synonyms
- Haminoea callidegenita (Gibson & Chia, 1989); Haminoea japonica Pilsbry, 1895

= Haloa japonica =

Species of gastropod

Haloa japonica, common name the Japanese bubble snail, is a species of sea snail or bubble snail, a marine opisthobranch gastropod mollusc in the family Haminoeidae, one of the families of bubble snails.

== Distribution ==
The species is found in the Pacific Ocean, Mediterranean and North Sea:

- Japan
- Korea
- Hong Kong
- The Philippines
- Thailand
- Mediterranean Sea including Sète and Étang de Berre, France
- California and Washington, USA
- Southern British Columbia, Canada
- Taiwan
- Netherlands (incl. Zeeland)

== Description ==
Their shells have length around 11 mm and width around 8 mm.

== Parasites ==
The parasites of Haloa japonica include an avian schistosome, which has been implicated in human cercarial dermatitis in San Francisco Bay, California.
