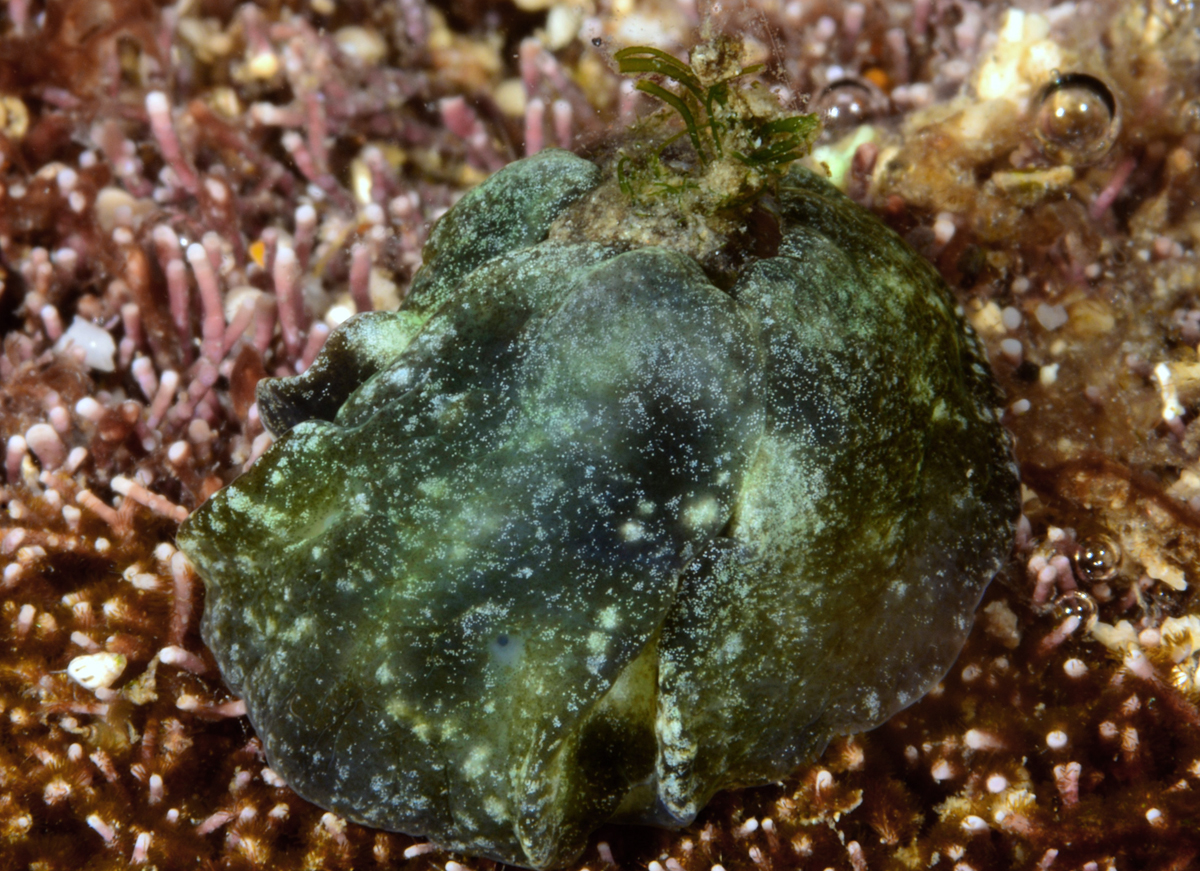
- Smaragdinella calyculata

Scientific classification
- Kingdom: Animalia
- Phylum: Mollusca
- Class: Gastropoda
- Order: Cephalaspidea
- Superfamily: Haminoeoidea
- Family: Haminoeidae
- Genus: Smaragdinella; A. Adams, 1848

Type species
- Bulla viridis Quoy & Gaimard, 1833

Synonyms
- Glauconella Gray, 1850; Linteria A. Adams, 1850

= Smaragdinella =

Genus of sea snails

Smaragdinella is a genus of medium-sized sea snails or bubble snails, marine opisthobranch gastropod molluscs in the family Haminoeidae, the haminoea bubble snails, part of the clade Cephalaspidea, the headshield slugs and bubble snails.

== Species ==
Species within the genus Smaragdinella include:

- Smaragdinella calyculata (Broderip & G. B. Sowerby I, 1829)
- Smaragdinella fragilis Bozzetti, 2008
- Smaragdinella kirsteueri Ev. Marcus & Er. Marcus, 1970
- Smaragdinella sieboldi A. Adams, 1864

Species brought into synonymy

- Smaragdinella algirae (A. Adams in G. B. Sowerby II, 1850): synonym of Melanochlamys algirae (A. Adams in G. B. Sowerby II, 1850)
- Smaragdinella andersoni (G. Nevill & H. Nevill, 1871): synonym of Smaragdinella sieboldi A. Adams, 1864
- Smaragdinella canaliculata (Broderip & G.B. Sowerby I, 1829): synonym of Smaragdinella calyculata (Broderip & G. B. Sowerby I, 1829)
- Smaragdinella thecaphora Carpenter, 1857: synonym of Julia thecaphora (Carpenter, 1857)
- Smaragdinella viridis (Rang in Quoy & Gaimard, 1832): synonym of Smaragdinella calyculata (Broderip & G. B. Sowerby I, 1829)
