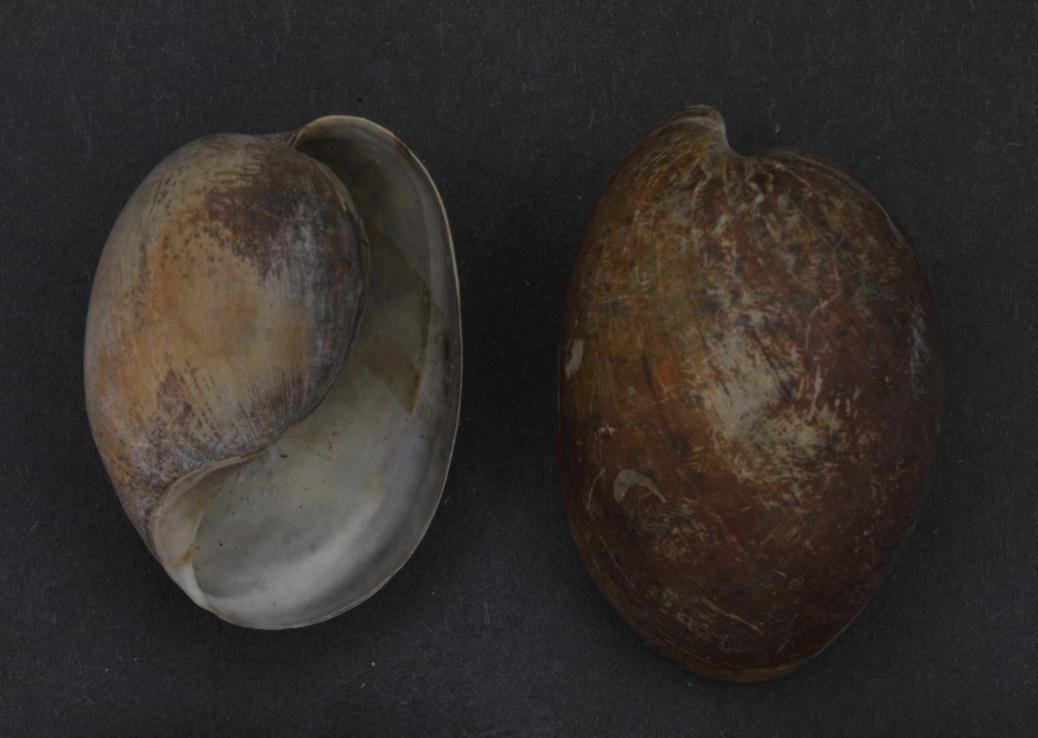
- A shell of Bulla gouldiana

Scientific classification
- Kingdom: Animalia
- Phylum: Mollusca
- Class: Gastropoda
- Order: Cephalaspidea
- Superfamily: Bulloidea
- Family: Bullidae; Gray, 1827
- Genus: Bulla; Linnaeus, 1758

Type species
- Bulla ampulla Linnaeus, 1758

Species
- See text

Synonyms
- Bullaria Rafinesque, 1815; Quibulla Iredale, 1929; Vesica Swainson, 1840

= Bulla (gastropod) =

Genus of sea snails

Bulla is a genus of medium to large hermaphrodite sea snails, shelled marine opisthobranch gastropod molluscs. These herbivorous snails are in the order Cephalaspidea.

These snails are popularly known as "bubble snails" because the shell of some of the species is very inflated indeed, almost spherical in shape, and is also very thin and light.

According to some experts, Bulla is currently the only genus in the family Bullidae, which in turn is the only member of the superfamily Bulloidea.

In addition to its taxonomic interest, Bulla — particularly Bulla gouldiana — has served as an important model organism in circadian biology research, where it has been used to investigate circadian rhythms, photoentrainment, and the neural basis of biological timekeeping, contributing to the broader understanding of biological rhythms and neural systems.

== Taxonomy ==
Bulla, Haminoea and Smaragdinella form the well-defined monophyletic group Bulloidea, according to the 1996 phylogenetic analysis of Paula M. Mikkelsen (Malacologia, 37(2): 375-442). But, according to Dr. Bill Rudman and others, differences in the alimentary canal and reproductive system, still put Haminoea and Smaragdinella into the separate superfamily Haminoeidea.

Historically, since the 18th century and even in the 20th century, the genus name Bulla has been used for a great number of bubble-shelled species that belonged to the order Cephalapsidea. From the mid-20th century, authors began to restrict species to the genus Bulla in its current meaning. But misidentifications were still numerous through high levels of intraspecific variability in the shell, radula and male genital system. The monograph by Malaquias & Reid (2008) has offered a systematic revision of this genus and has brought order in this genus

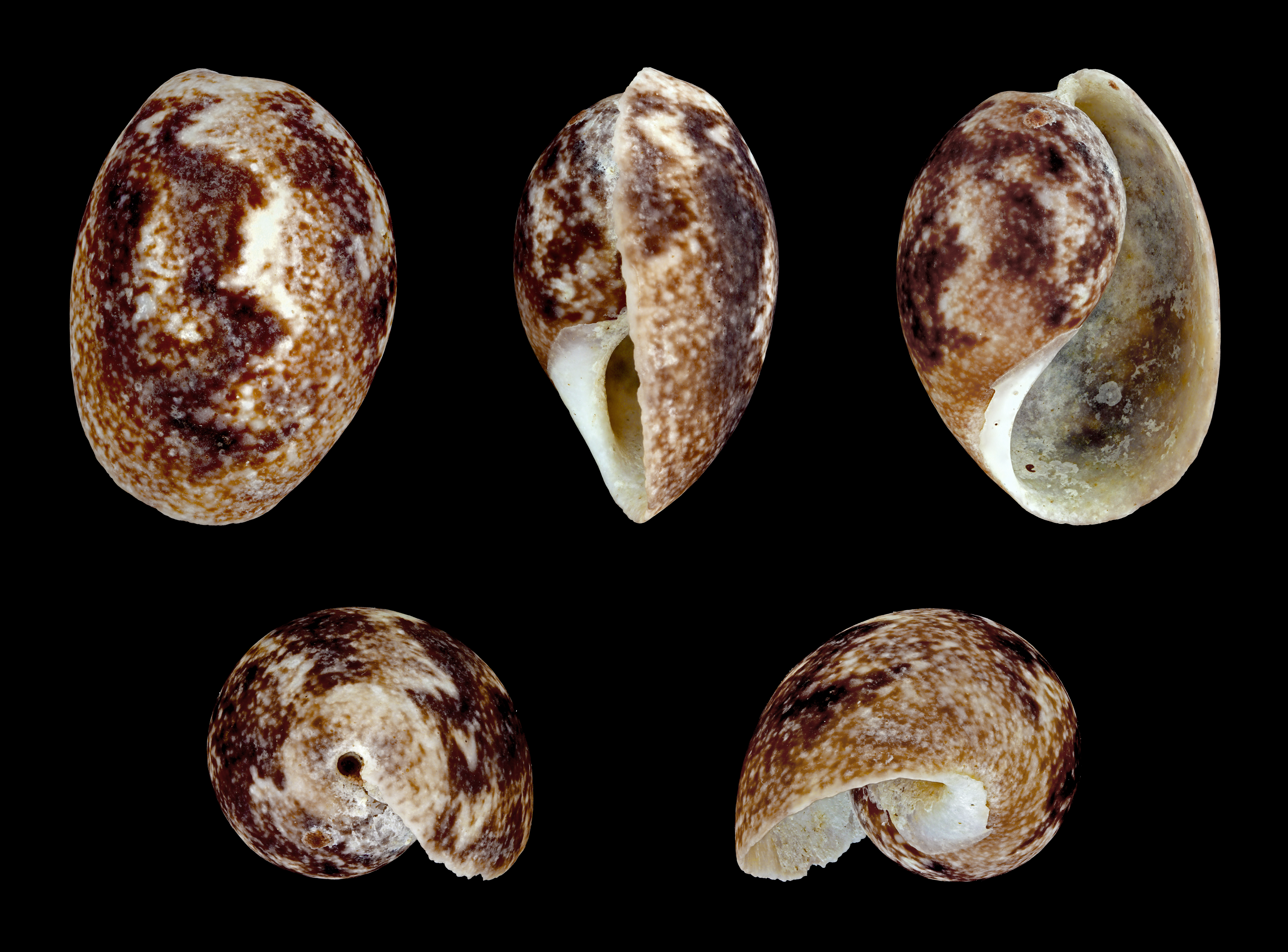
Bulla ampulla

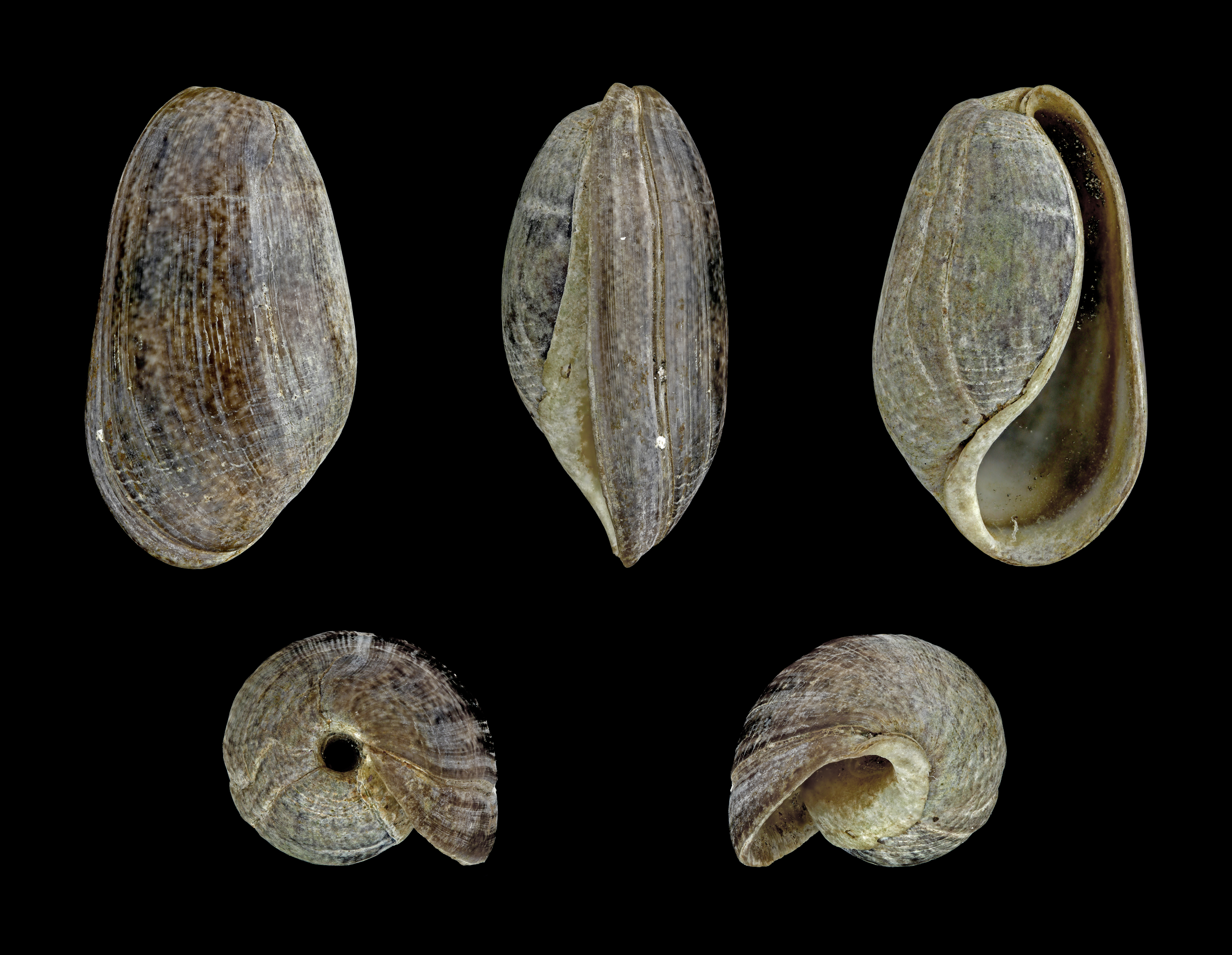
Bulla striata

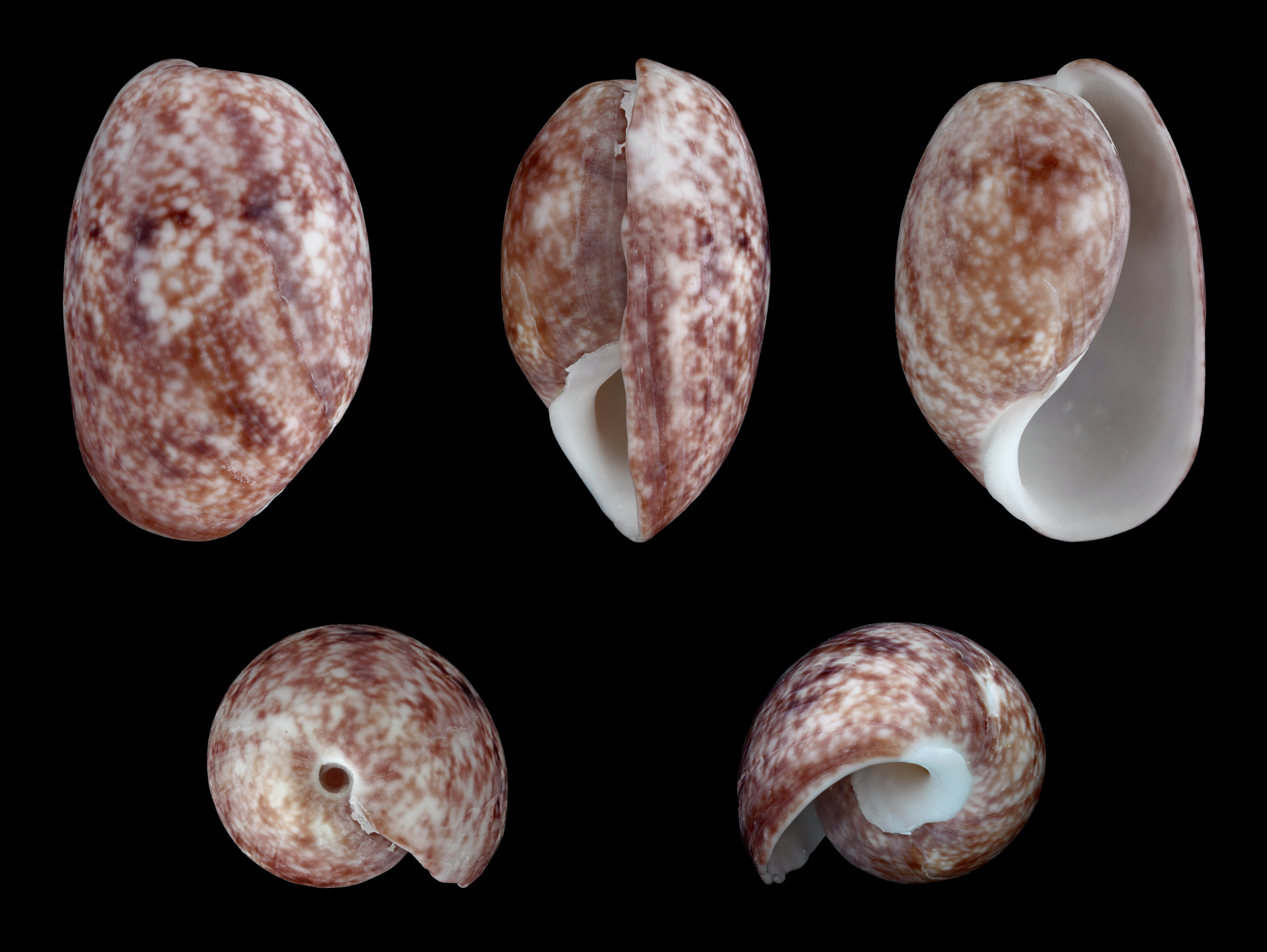
Bulla vernicosa

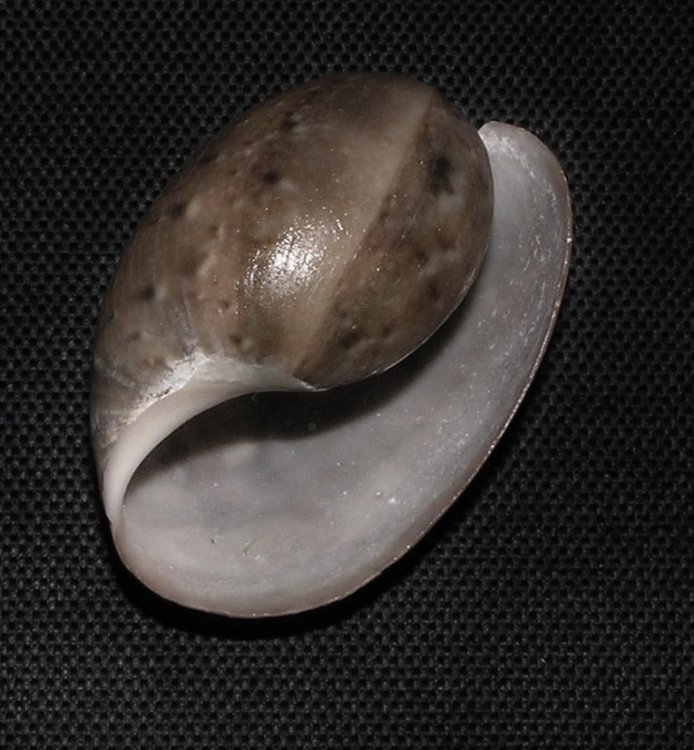
Bulla gouldiana

== Anatomy ==
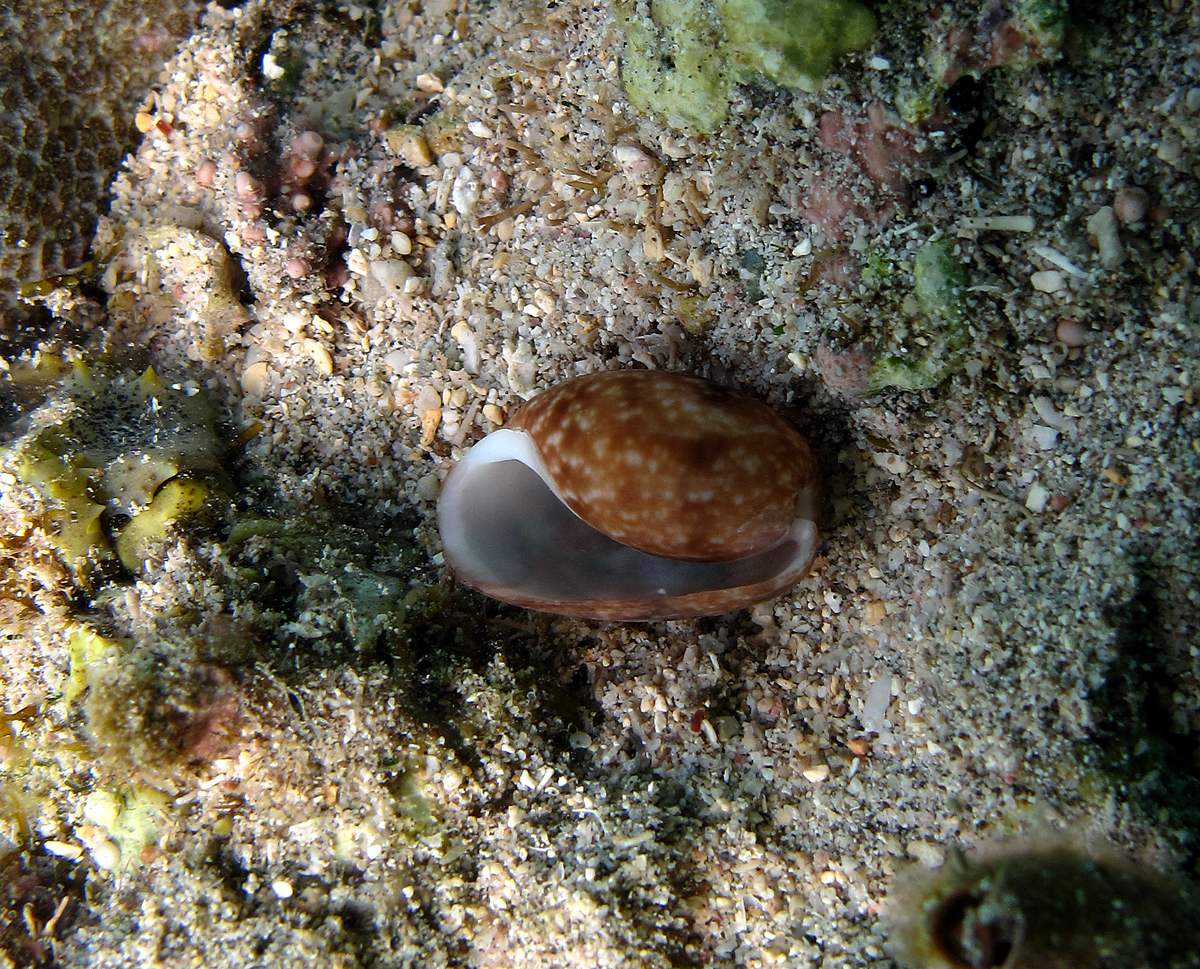
A shell of Bulla vernicosa

=== Shell description ===
All Bulla species have large, ovate external shells, which are large enough to accommodate the whole snail when retracted. All species have rather similarly shaped shells. The shells have a deep, narrow umbilicus at the apex. There is no operculum.

The smooth shell of Bulla is ovate and expanded, with a deep, sunken involute top. Since there is little difference between the shells and in the morphology of the radular teeth, there is some uncertainty about the exact taxonomy of the species in Bulla.

=== Anatomy of the soft parts ===
The gizzard of Bulla is rather different from that of other herbivorous groups. It has three large corneous crushing plates and ancillary corneous spines, instead of just grinding plates. The crawling snails show prominent, frilled or lobed parapodia.

Bulla species have a soft radula.

== Life habits ==
These snails are mostly nocturnal and can be found on shallow, sandy coasts grazing among sea grasses, feeding primarily on green algae. They bury themselves in mud when the tide is out.

== Predators ==
In the coastal lagoons and bays of California, the colorful nudibranch Navanax inermis is a well-known predator of sea slugs, especially Bulla gouldiana, which it envelopes whole.

== Species ==
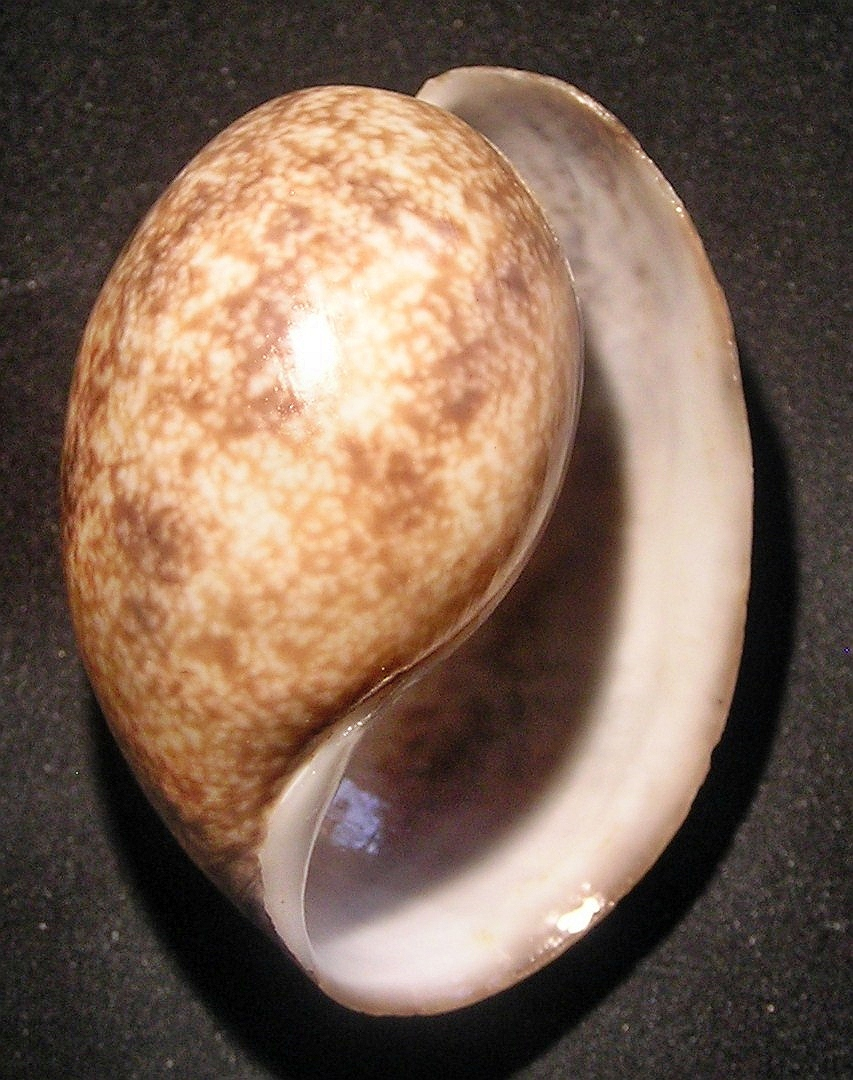
A shell of Bulla ampulla

- Bulla ampulla Linnaeus, 1758 Pacific bulla, ampulle bulla
  - Distribution : on sandy sublittoral bottoms of warmer seas, tropical Indo-Pacific, Pakistan, Sri Lanka, Philippines
  - Length : 60 mm (largest shell of the Cephalaspidea)
  - Description : This is the common Bulla in tropical Indo-Pacific; globose, inflated, moderately solid body whorl. The white aperture is as long as the rest of the shell.The rounded outer lip is extended posteriorly beyond the apex. Columella in a reversed 'S'-shape, smooth and thinly callous. Cream-colored with blotches of dark, purple-brown.
- Bulla arabica Malaquias & Reid, 2008
- Bulla bermudae Verrill and Bush, 1900
  - Distribution : Bermudas
  - Length : 3 mm
- Bulla clausa Dall, 1889 imperforate bubble
  - Distribution : Florida
  - Length : 12 mm
- Bulla gouldiana Pilsbry, 1895 California bubble, Gould's bubble, cloudy bubble
  - Distribution : Northwest America, California to Ecuador
  - Length : 30–64 mm
  - Description: semi-transparent head, mantle and foot are yellowish-brown with mottled pale-bluish dots; reddish to brown involute (= sunken) apex; the aperture is wide anteriorly, narrow posteriorly; their egg mass is yellow to orange tangled string of jelly, containing oval capsules. Each one contains up to 25 eggs, which develop into veliger larvae.
- Bulla indolens Dall, 1927
  - Distribution : Georgia
  - Length : 7.5 mm
  - Description : found at depths up to 800 m
- Bulla japonica T. Habe, 1976
  - Distribution : Japan
- Bulla krebsii Dall, 1889
  - Distribution : Guadeloupe
  - Length : 8 mm
  - Description : found at depths up to 1400 m
- Bulla mabillei E. A. A. Locard, 1896 Mabille's bubble
  - Distribution : Turkey, Canaries, Madeira, Cape Verde, West Africa
  - Length : 33–52 mm
  - Description : larger than the other European species; difficult to obtain; color : yellowish-brown with dark bluish dots
- Bulla morgana Dall, 1908
  - Distribution : West America
- Bulla occidentalis A. Adams, 1850 (synonym of Bulla striata) common West Indian bubble
  - Distribution : Brazil, North Carolina to Florida, Bahamas, Caribbean.
  - Length : 25 mm
  - Description : thin, rotund, oval shell with a smooth, glazed surface; pale color with brown spots; involute (= sunken) apex; large body whorl; long aperture, wide anteriorly; white columella.
- Bulla orientalis T. Habe, 1941
  - Distribution : Indo Pacific
  - Description : brown punctuate marks on the shell
- Bulla peasiana Pilsbry, 1895
- Bulla punctulata A. Adams In Sowerby, 1850
  - Distribution : Pacific, California, Mexico, Peru
  - Length : 30 mm
  - Description : the shell looks like the one of Bulla ampulla, but is smaller and more cylindrical. Its color is cream, with clouding of brown or gray in two to four spiral bands, generally spotted with squarish chocolate dots, bordered to the right by white spots.
- Bulla quoyii Gray in Dieffenbach, 1843 brown bubble shell
  - Distribution : Southern Australia, northern New Zealand.
  - Length : 44 mm-60 mm
  - Description :The calcified shell has a gray-brown color, with blotches of various shades of brown; the snail has a bright honey-golden color. The hind extremities of the headshield have evolved into tentacles, directing the water over Hancock's organ. The egg-mass is a jelly-like sphere, with the eggs in a spiral string. After the breeding period, there occurs a mass mortality of the animals, just like the sea hares.
- Bulla solida Gmelin, 1791 solid bubble
  - Distribution : Mexico, Florida, Texas, Cuba, Colombia.
  - Length : 30–52 mm
  - Description : found at depths up to 25 m
- Bulla striata Bruguière, 1792 common Atlantic bubble, striate bubble
  - Distribution : Mediterranean, Morocco, Canaries, Azores, Atlantic Ocean, Florida
  - Length : 12–30 mm
  - Description : The shell is thin, delicate and rather narrow. The body whorl is oval and convex. The smooth elongated aperture narrows posteriorly, but is wide anteriorly. The columellar callus is rather small; The thin outer lip is incurved and extends a little beyond the apex; The color is brown-gray, with darker, smudged dots and dashes, spread unevenly over the surface. The surface is smooth, with some spiral grooves at the posterior end and at the apical umbilicus. There is no operculum. The foot is well developed. There are no parapodia (fleshy winglike outgrowths). The broadened head has no tentacles. The gills and the osphradium are inside the mantle cavity. The radula has three laterals on each side of the central tooth.
- Bulla vernicosa Gould, 1859 (most probably a color variant of Bulla ampulla)
  - Distribution : Indo Pacific, Thailand, Indonesia, Philippines, Taiwan, Tonga
  - Length : 27–50 mm
  - Description : white-colored shell with light brown spots

== Other species ==
In addition to the above, there are a substantial number of names in Bulla that apply to the species Akera bullata, including Bulla akera (Gmelin, J.F., 1791), Bulla norwegica (Bruguière, J.G., 1789), Bulla canaliculata (Olivi, 1792), Bulla resiliens (Donovan, E., 1801), Bulla fragilis (Lamarck, J.B.P.A. de, 1822), Bulla hanleyi (Adams A. in Sowerby G.B. II, 1850/1855), Bulla elastica (Sandri & Danilo, 1856), Bulla farrani (Norman, 1890), Bulla globosa (Cantraine, F.J., 1840)

== Synonyms ==
Extended list of synonyms
- Bulla abyssicola Dall, 1881 (junior synonym of Bulla pinguicula)
- Bulla achatina Linnaeus, 1758: synonym of Achatina achatina (Linnaeus, 1758)
- Bulla acuminata Bruguière, 1792: synonym of Volvulella acuminata (Bruguière, 1792)
- Bulla acuta d'Orbigny, 1841: synonym of Volvulella minuta (Bush, 1885)
- Bulla adansonii Philippi, 1847 : synonym of Bulla striata Bruguière, 1792
  - Distribution: West Africa, Gabon, Cape Verde
  - Length : 15 mm
- Bulla akera Gmelin, 1791: synonym of Akera bullata O. F. Müller, 1776
- Bulla alba Turton, 1825: synonym of Bulla striata Bruguière, 1792
- Bulla albocincta van der Hoeven, 1839: synonym of Hydatina albocincta (van der Hoeven, 1839)
- Bulla algirae A. Adams in G. B. Sowerby II, 1850: synonym of Melanochlamys algirae (A. Adams in G. B. Sowerby II, 1850)
- Bulla amplustre Linnaeus, 1758: synonym of Aplustrum amplustre (Linnaeus, 1758)
- Bulla amygdala Dillwyn, 1817 : synonym of Bulla striata
  - Distribution: Canaries, East Atlantic, Mediterranean, Florida, Brazil
  - Length : 40 mm
- Bulla amygdalum Dillwyn, 1817: synonym of Bulla striata Bruguière, 1792
- Bulla amygdalus Dillwyn, 1817: synonym of Bulla striata Bruguière, 1792
- Bulla angasi Pilsbry, 1893 : synonym of Bulla mabillei Locard, 1897
  - Distribution: Australia
  - Length: 25 mm
  - Description: smooth, sturdy, cylindrical shell; color : dark brown
- Bulla antillarum d'Orbigny, 1841: synonym of Haminoea antillarum (d'Orbigny, 1841)
- Bulla aperta Linnaeus, 1767: synonym of Philine aperta (Linnaeus, 1767)
- Bulla arachis Quoy & Gaimard, 1833: synonym of Adamnestia arachis (Quoy & Gaimard, 1833)
- Bulla aspersa A. Adams, 1850: synonym of Bulla punctulata A. Adams in Sowerby, 1850
- Bulla atrolineata Schröter, 1804: synonym of Hydatina physis (Linnaeus, 1758)
- Bulla aurisjudae Linnaeus, 1758: synonym of Ellobium aurisjudae (Linnaeus, 1758)
- Bulla aurismidae Linnaeus, 1758: synonym of Ellobium aurismidae (Linnaeus, 1758)
- Bulla australis Gray, 1825: synonym of Bulla quoyii Gray, 1843
- Bulla australis Quoy & Gaimard, 1833: synonym of Bulla quoyii Gray, 1843
- Bulla bidentata d'Orbigny, 1841: synonym of Cylichnella bidentata (d'Orbigny, 1841)
- Bulla biplex A. Adams, 1850: synonym of Truncacteocina biplex (A. Adams, 1850)
- Bulla biplicata A. Adams, 1850 (synonym of Acteocina bidentata (d'Orbigny, 1841))
  - Distribution : Japan, New Jersey, North Carolina, Florida, Caribbean, Brazil, Uruguay
  - Length : 4 mm
- Bulla birostris Linnaeus, 1767: synonym of Phenacovolva birostris (Linnaeus, 1767)
- Bulla bizona A. Adams, 1850: synonym of Mnestia bizona (A. Adams, 1850)
- Bulla blainvilliana Récluz, 1843: synonym of Atys jeffreysi (Weinkauff, 1866)
- Bulla blainvilliana Récluz, 1843: synonym of Cylichnina umbilicata (Montagu, 1803): synonym of Retusa umbilicata (Montagu, 1803)
- Bulla botanica Ch. Hedley, 1918 Australian true bubble, common true bubble : synonym of Bulla quoyii Gray, 1843
  - Distribution : Australia
  - Length : 32–55 mm
- Bulla brevis Quoy & Gaimard, 1833: synonym of Liloa brevis (Quoy & Gaimard, 1833)
- Bulla bulla da Costa, 1778: synonym of Philine quadripartita Ascanius, 1772
- Bulla calyculata Broderip & G. B. Sowerby I, 1829: synonym of Smaragdinella calyculata (Broderip & G. B. Sowerby I, 1829)
- Bulla canaliculata Linnaeus, 1758: synonym of Tonna canaliculata (Linnaeus, 1758)
- Bulla carnea Poiret, 1789: synonym of Pseudosimnia carnea (Poiret, 1789)
- Bulla carnosa Cuvier, 1810: synonym of Philinopsis depicta (Renier, 1807)
- Bulla castanea A. Adams, 1850: synonym of Bulla quoyii Gray, 1843
- Bulla catena Montagu, 1803: synonym of Philine catena (Montagu, 1803)
- Bulla catenulifera MacGillivray, 1843: synonym of Philine scabra (O. F. Müller, 1784)
- Bulla cerealis Gould, 1853: synonym of Acteocina cerealis (Gould, 1853)
- Bulla cerina Menke, 1853: synonym of Haminoea antillarum (d'Orbigny, 1841)
- Bulla ceylanica Bruguière, 1792: synonym of Akera soluta (Gmelin, 1791)
- Bulla cinctoria Perry, 1811: synonym of Hydatina zonata (Lightfoot, 1786)
- Bulla coarctata A. Adams, 1850: synonym of Truncacteocina coarctata (A. Adams, 1850)
- Bulla coffea Linnaeus, 1758: synonym of Melampus coffea (Linnaeus, 1758)
- Bulla columellaris Menke, 1854: synonym of Bulla ampulla Linnaeus, 1758
- Bulla columnae Delle Chiaje, 1827: synonym of Bulla striata Bruguière, 1792
- Bulla concentrica A. Adams, 1850: synonym of Pyrunculus concentricus (A. Adams, 1850)
- Bulla conspersa Pease, 1869: synonym of Bulla vernicosa Gould, 1859
- Bulla cornea Lamarck, 1822: synonym of Haminoea navicula (da Costa, 1778)
- Bulla corticata Møller, 1842: synonym of Cylichna alba (Brown, 1827)
- Bulla cranchii Fleming, 1828: synonym of Roxania utriculus (Brocchi, 1814)
- Bulla cretica Forbes, 1844: synonym of Diaphana cretica (Forbes, 1844)
- Bulla cruentata A. Adams, 1850 shiny bubble : synonym of Bulla mabillei Locard, 1897
  - Distribution : Indian Ocean
- Bulla culcitella Gould, 1853: synonym of Acteocina culcitella (Gould, 1853)
- Bulla curta A. Adams 1850: synonym of Liloa mongii (Audouin, 1826)
- Bulla cuticulifera E. A. Smith, 1872: synonym of Liloa brevis (Quoy & Gaimard, 1833)
- Bulla cylindracea Pennant, 1777: synonym of Cylichna cylindracea (Pennant, 1777)
- Bulla cylindrica Helbling, 1779: synonym of Aliculastrum cylindricum (Helbling, 1779)
- Bulla cylindrica Bruguière, 1792: synonym of Cylichna cylindracea (Pennant, 1777)
- Bulla cymbalum Quoy & Gaimard, 1832: synonym of Haminoea cymbalum (Quoy & Gaimard, 1832)
- Bulla dactylis Menke, 1853: synonym of Bulla striata Bruguière, 1792
- Bulla debilis Gould, 1840: synonym of Diaphana minuta T. Brown, 1827
- Bulla decussata A. Adams, 1850: synonym of Pyrunculus decussatus (A. Adams, 1850)
- Bulla delorti Mabille, 1896: synonym of Bulla ampulla Linnaeus, 1758
- Bulla denticulata J. Adams, 1800: synonym of Philine denticulata (J. Adams, 1800)
- Bulla dentifera A. Adams, 1850: synonym of Diniatys dentifer (A. Adams, 1850)
- Bulla desgenettii Audouin, 1826: synonym of Retusa desgenettii (Audouin, 1826)
- Bulla diaphana Gould, 1852: synonym of Haminoea elegans (Gray, 1825)
- Bulla diaphana Aradas & Maggiore, 1840: synonym of Weinkauffia turgidula (Forbes, 1844)
- Bulla diaphana Montagu, 1803: synonym of Trivia arctica (Pulteney, 1799)
- Bulla difficilis T. Habe, 1950 : synonym of Bulla vernicosa Gould, 1859
  - Distribution; Japan
- Bulla dubiosa Mabille, 1896: synonym of Bulla quoyii Gray, 1843
- Bulla eburnea (Dall, 1927): synonym of Leucophysema eburneola (Dall, 1927), synonym of Roxania eburneola (Dall, 1927)
- Bulla eburneola (Dall, 1927): synonym of Leucophysema eburneola (Dall, 1927): synonym of Roxania eburneola (Dall, 1927)
- Bulla elastica Danilo & Sandri, 1856: synonym of Akera bullata O. F. Müller, 1776
- Bulla elegans Menke, 1830: synonym of Micromelo undatus (Bruguière, 1792)
- Bulla elegans Gray, 1825: synonym of Haminoea elegans (Gray, 1825)
- Bulla elongata A. Adams in G. B. Sowerby II, 1850: synonym of Aliculastrum cylindricum (Helbling, 1779)
- Bulla eumicra Crosse in Crosse & Fischer, 1865: synonym of Tornatina eumicra (Crosse, 1865): synonym of Acteocina eumicra (Crosse, 1865)
- Bulla exigua A. Adams, 1850: synonym of Austrocylichna exigua (A. Adams, 1850)
- Bulla exilis Dunker, 1860: synonym of Acteocina exilis (Dunker, 1860)
- Bulla eximia Deshayes, 1863: synonym of Micromelo guamensis (Quoy & Gaimard, 1825)
- Bulla farrani Norman, 1890: synonym of Akera bullata O. F. Müller, 1776
- Bulla fasciata Bruguière, 1792: synonym of Hydatina fasciata (Bruguière, 1792)
- Bulla ferruginosa A. Adams in G. B. Sowerby II, 1850: synonym of Atys naucum (Linnaeus, 1758)
- Bulla ficus (Linnaeus, 1758): synonym of Ficus ficus (Linnaeus, 1758)
- Bulla flavescens A. Adams, 1850: synonym of Haminoea flavescens (A. Adams, 1850)
- Bulla flexilis Montagu, 1808: synonym of Velutina plicatilis (O. F. Müller, 1776)
- Bulla folliculus Menke, 1853: synonym of Haminoea navicula (da Costa, 1778)
- Bulla fontinalis Linnaeus, 1758: synonym of Physa fontinalis (Linnaeus, 1758)
- Bulla fourierii Audouin, 1826: synonym of Pyrunculus fourierii (Audouin, 1826)
- Bulla fragilis Lamarck, 1822: synonym of Akera bullata O. F. Müller, 1776
- Bulla fragilis Vélain, 1877: synonym of Notodiaphana fragilis (Vélain, 1877)
- Bulla gargottae Calcara, 1840: synonym of Oxynoe olivacea Rafinesque, 1814
- Bulla gemma A. E. Verrill, 1880 jewel bubble : synonym of Roxania semilaevis (Seguenza, 1880)
  - Distribution : New York
  - Length : 4.2 mm
- Bulla gibbosa Linnaeus, 1758: synonym of Cyphoma gibbosum (Linnaeus, 1758)
- Bulla girardi Audouin, 1826: synonym of Ventomnestia girardi (Audouin, 1826)
- Bulla glauca A. Adams, 1850: synonym of Smaragdinella calyculata (Broderip & G. B. Sowerby I, 1829)
- Bulla gracilis A. Adams, 1850: synonym of Acteocina gracilis (A. Adams, 1850)
- Bulla guernei Dautzenberg, 1889: synonym of Roxania pinguicula (Seguenza, 1880)
- Bulla guildingii Swainson, 1840: synonym of Haminoea elegans (Gray, 1825)
- Bulla haliotidea Renier in Gerville, 1825: synonym of Simnia patula (Pennant, 1777)
- Bulla haliotoidea Montagu, 1803: synonym of Lamellaria perspicua (Linnaeus, 1758)
- Bulla hanleyi Adams A. in Sowerby G.B. II, 1850: synonym of Akera bullata O. F. Müller, 1776
- Bulla helicoides Brocchi, 1814: synonym of Ampulla priamus (Gmelin, 1791)
- Bulla hiemalis Couthouy, 1839: synonym of Diaphana hiemalis (Couthouy, 1839)
- Bulla hirundinina Quoy & Gaimard, 1833: synonym of Chelidonura hirundinina (Quoy & Gaimard, 1833)
- Bulla hoernesii Weinkauff, 1866: synonym of Pyrunculus hoernesii (Weinkauff, 1866)
- Bulla hyalina Turton, 1834: synonym of Diaphana minuta T. Brown, 1827
- Bulla hydatis Linnaeus, 1758: synonym of Haminoea hydatis (Linnaeus, 1758)
- Bulla imperialis Solander, 1786: synonym of Ovula costellata Lamarck, 1810
- Bulla incincta Mighels, 1844: synonym of Acteocina canaliculata (Say, 1826)
- Bulla incommoda E. A. Smith, 1891: synonym of Sphaerocylichna incommoda (E. A. Smith, 1891)
- Bulla inculta Gould, 1855: synonym of Acteocina inculta (Gould, 1855)
- Bulla involuta A. Adams, 1850: synonym of Cylichna involuta (A. Adams, 1850)
- Bulla laevis Aradas & Maggiore, 1840: synonym of Scaphander lignarius (Linnaeus, 1758)
- Bulla latens Müller O.F., 1776: synonym of Lamellaria latens (Müller O. F., 1776)
- Bulla lepida Dillwyn, 1817: synonym of Pseudosimnia carnea (Poiret, 1789)
- Bulla lignaria Linnaeus, 1758: synonym of Scaphander lignarius (Linnaeus, 1758)
- Bulla lima Brown, 1827: synonym of Philine lima (Brown, 1827)
- Bulla lineata Gray, 1825: synonym of Bullina lineata (Gray, 1825)
- Bulla lineolata Couthouy, 1839: synonym of Philine lima (Brown, 1827)
- Bulla lutea Quoy & Gaimard, 1833: synonym of Phanerophthalmus luteus (Quoy & Gaimard, 1833)
- Bulla mammillata Philippi, 1836: synonym of Retusa mammillata (Philippi, 1836)
- Bulla marmorata A. Adams, 1850: synonym of Mnestia marmorata (A. Adams, 1850)
- Bulla marmorea Pease, 1860: synonym of Bulla peasiana Pilsbry, 1895
- Bulla millepunctata Locard, 1897: synonym of Scaphander nobilis Verrill, 1884
- Bulla minor A. Adams, 1850: synonym of Smaragdinella calyculata (Broderip & G. B. Sowerby I, 1829)
- Bulla modesta Risso, 1826: synonym of Haminoea hydatis (Linnaeus, 1758)
- Bulla mongii Audouin, 1826: synonym of Liloa mongii (Audouin, 1826)
- Bulla monodonta A. Adams, 1850: synonym of Diniatys monodonta (A. Adams, 1850)
- Bulla mucronata Philippi, 1849: synonym of Acteocina mucronata (Philippi, 1849)
- Bulla naucum Linnaeus, 1758: synonym of Atys naucum (Linnaeus, 1758)
- Bulla navicula da Costa, 1778: synonym of Haminoea navicula (da Costa, 1778)
- Bulla nebulosa Gould in Adams, 1850 : synonym of Bulla gouldiana Pilsbry, 1895
  - Distribution : Atlantic
- Bulla nitida A. Adams, 1850: synonym of Pyrunculus pyriformis (A. Adams, 1850)
- Bulla nitidula Dillwyn, 1817: synonym of Micromelo undatus (Bruguière, 1792)
- Bulla norwegica Bruguière, 1792: synonym of Akera bullata O. F. Müller, 1776
- Bulla nucleola Reeve, 1855: synonym of Cylichna nucleola (Reeve, 1855)
- Bulla nucleus Dillwyn, 1817: synonym of Pseudosimnia carnea (Poiret, 1789)
- Bulla nucleus Mawe, 1823: synonym of Pseudosimnia carnea (Poiret, 1789)
- Bulla nux Menke, 1853: synonym of Bulla occidentalis A. Adams, 1850
- Bulla oblonga A. Adams, 1850: synonym of Bulla quoyii Gray, 1843
- Bulla obstricta Gould, 1839: synonym of Acteocina canaliculata (Say, 1826)
- Bulla obtusa Montagu, 1803: synonym of Retusa obtusa (Montagu, 1803)
- Bulla occulta Mighels & Adams, 1842: synonym of Cylichna occulta (Mighels & Adams, 1842)
- Bulla oliva Gmelin, 1791: synonym of Cylichna cylindracea (Pennant, 1777)
- Bulla omphalodes Menke, 1853: synonym of Bulla striata Bruguière, 1792
- Bulla orbignyana de Férussac, 1822: synonym of Haminoea orbignyana (Férussac, 1822)
- Bulla oryza Totten, 1835: synonym of Cylichnella oryza (Totten, 1835)
- Bulla ovula Gould in Sowerby, 1868: synonym of Bulla vernicosa Gould, 1859
- Bulla ovulata Brocchi, 1814 sensu Jeffreys, 1856: synonym of Atys jeffreysi (Weinkauff, 1866)
- Bulla ovulina A. Adams, 1850: synonym of Volvulella ovulina (A. Adams, 1850)
- Bulla ovulum Gould in Angas, 1867: synonym of Bulla vernicosa Gould, 1859
- Bulla ovum Linnaeus, 1758: synonym of Ovula ovum (Linnaeus, 1758)
- Bulla pallida Linnaeus, 1758: synonym of Hyalina pallida (Linnaeus, 1758)
- Bulla parallela Gould, 1847: synonym of Aliculastrum parallelum (Gould, 1847)
- Bulla patula Pennant, 1777: synonym of Xandarovula patula (Pennant, 1777): synonym of Simnia patula (Pennant, 1777)
- Bulla pectinata Dillwyn, 1817: synonym of Philine scabra (O. F. Müller, 1784)
- Bulla pellucida Brown, 1827: synonym of Retusa truncatula (Bruguière, 1792)
- Bulla pellucida Sars G.O., 1878: synonym of Retusa pellucida (Sars G. O., 1878)
- Bulla perdicinia Menke, 1853: synonym of Bulla striata Bruguière, 1792
- Bulla pertenuis Mighels, 1843: synonym of Retusa obtusa (Montagu, 1803)
- Bulla physis Linnaeus, 1758: synonym of Hydatina physis (Linnaeus, 1758)
- Bulla physis Gmelin, 1791: synonym of Hydatina vesicaria (Lightfoot, 1786)
- Bulla pinguicula Seguenza, 1879: synonym of Roxania pinguicula (Seguenza, 1880)
- Bulla plicata Brown, 1827: synonym of Retusa obtusa (Montagu, 1803)
- Bulla plicatilis O. F. Müller, 1776: synonym of Velutina plicatilis (O. F. Müller, 1776)
- Bulla plumula Montagu, 1803: synonym of Berthella plumula (Montagu, 1803)
- Bulla producta Brown, 1827: synonym of Cylichna cylindracea (Pennant, 1777)
- Bulla propecylindracea de Gregorio, 1890: synonym of Cylichna propecylindracea (de Gregorio, 1890)
- Bulla pulchella Swainson, 1840: synonym of Aplustrum amplustre (Linnaeus, 1758)
- Bulla punctata Adams J., 1800: synonym of Philine punctata (J. Adams, 1800)
- Bulla punctata A. Adams in Sowerby, 1868: synonym of Bulla mabillei Locard, 1897
- Bulla punctata [sic]: synonym of Bulla punctulata A. Adams in Sowerby, 1850
- Bulla punctostriata Mighels & Adams, 1842: synonym of Scaphander punctostriatus (Mighels & Adams, 1842)
- Bulla pygmaea A. Adams, 1850: synonym of Retusa pygmaea (A. Adams, 1850)
- Bulla pyriformis A. Adams, 1850: synonym of Pyrunculus pyriformis (A. Adams, 1850)
- Bulla quadrata S. Wood, 1839: synonym of Philine quadrata (S. Wood, 1839)
- Bulla quoyana d'Orbigny, 1845: synonym of Hydatina physis (Linnaeus, 1758)
- Bulla quoyi Gray in A. Adams, 1850: synonym of Bulla punctulata A. Adams in Sowerby, 1850
- Bulla rapa (Linnaeus, 1758): synonym of Rapa rapa (Linnaeus, 1758)
- Bulla regularis Gould, 1859: synonym of Adamnestia arachis (Quoy & Gaimard, 1833)
- Bulla reinhardi Møller, 1842: synonym of Cylichna occulta (Mighels & Adams, 1842)
- Bulla resiliens Donovan, 1801: synonym of Akera bullata O. F. Müller, 1776
- Bulla retifer Forbes, 1844: synonym of Philine retifera (Forbes, 1844)
- Bulla retifera Forbes, 1844: synonym of Philine retifera (Forbes, 1844)
- Bulla retusa Maton & Rackett, 1807: synonym of Retusa truncatula (Bruguière, 1792)
- Bulla robagliana Fischer P. in de Folin, 1869: synonym of Cylichnina robagliana (P. Fischer, 1869): synonym of Retusa robagliana (P. Fischer, 1869)
- Bulla roperiana Pilsbry, 1895: synonym of Bulla striata Bruguière, 1792
- Bulla rostrata A. Adams in Sowerby, 1850: synonym of Volvulella rostrata (A. Adams, 1850)
- Bulla rubiginosa Gould, 1852: synonym of Bulla occidentalis A. Adams, 1850
- Bulla rufolabris A. Adams in Sowerby, 1850 : synonym of Bulla punctulata A. Adams, 1850
  - Distribution : West America, Galapagos
  - Length : 10–15 mm
- Bulla scabra O. F. Müller, 1784: synonym of Philine scabra (O. F. Müller, 1784)
- Bulla schroeteri Philippi, 1844: synonym of Philine aperta (Linnaeus, 1758)
- Bulla secale Dillwyn, 1817: synonym of Cymbovula acicularis (Lamarck, 1811)
- Bulla secunda Mabille, 1896: synonym of Bulla vernicosa Gould, 1859
- Bulla semisulcata Philippi, 1836: synonym of Retusa truncatula (Bruguière, 1792)
- Bulla simplex A. Adams, 1850: synonym of Acteocina simplex (A. Adams, 1850)
- Bulla simplex Locard, 1897: synonym of Relichna simplex (Locard, 1897)
- Bulla sinensis A. Adams, 1850: synonym of Bullacta exarata (Philippi, 1849)
- Bulla smaragdina A. Adams, 1874: synonym of Smaragdinella calyculata (Broderip & G. B. Sowerby I, 1829)
- Bulla smaragdina Rüppell & Leuckart, 1830: synonym of Phanerophthalmus smaragdinus (Rüppell & Leuckart, 1830)
- Bulla solida A. Adams in Sowerby, 1868: synonym of Bulla mabillei Locard, 1897
- Bulla solida Bruguière, 1792: synonym of Aliculastrum solidum (Bruguière, 1792)
- Bulla solida Dillwyn, 1817: synonym of Aliculastrum cylindricum (Helbling, 1779)
- Bulla solidula Linnaeus, 1758: synonym of Pupa solidula (Linnaeus, 1758)
- Bulla soluta Gmelin, 1791: synonym of Akera soluta (Gmelin, 1791)
- Bulla speciosa A. Adams, 1850: synonym of Atys caribaeus (d'Orbigny, 1841)
- Bulla spelta Linnaeus, 1758: synonym of Simnia spelta (Linnaeus, 1758)
- Bulla staminea Menke, 1835: synonym of Hydatina physis (Linnaeus, 1758)
- Bulla striatula A. Adams, 1850: synonym of Volvulella striatula (A. Adams, 1862)
- Bulla striatula Forbes, 1844: synonym of Retusa mammillata (Philippi, 1836)
- Bulla strigella A. Adams, 1850: synonym of Cylichna biplicata (A. Adams in Sowerby, 1850)
- Bulla subangulata Möller, 1842: synonym of Diaphana minuta T. Brown, 1827
- Bulla subaustralis Mabille, 1896: synonym of Bulla vernicosa Gould, 1859
- Bulla substriata Menke, 1853: synonym of Bulla quoyii Gray, 1843
- Bulla subtropicalis Powell, 1965: synonym of Bulla vernicosa Gould, 1859
- Bulla succisa A. Adams, 1850: synonym of Aliculastrum cylindricum (Helbling, 1779)
- Bulla sulcata d'Orbigny, 1841: synonym of Retusa sulcata (d'Orbigny, 1841)
- Bulla sulcata d'Orbigny, 1841: synonym of Retusa sulcata (d'Orbigny, 1841)
- Bulla tenella A. Adams, 1850: synonym of Haminoea tenella (A. Adams in Sowerby, 1850)
- Bulla tenera A. Adams, 1850: synonym of Haminoea tenera (A. Adams, 1850)
- Bulla tenuis A. Adams, 1850: synonym of Akera soluta (Gmelin, 1791)
- Bulla tenuissima G. B. Sowerby II, 1868: synonym of Bulla quoyii Gray, 1843
- Bulla thalassiarchi A. Adams, 1855: synonym of Aplustrum amplustre (Linnaeus, 1758)
- Bulla tornatilis Linnaeus, 1758: synonym of Acteon tornatilis (Linnaeus, 1758)
- Bulla trifasciata G. B. Sowerby II, 1868: synonym of Bulla ampulla Linnaeus, 1758
- Bulla triticea Couthouy, 1838: synonym of Jujubinus poppei Curini-Galletti, 1985
- Bulla truncata Adams J., 1800: synonym of Retusa truncatula (Bruguière, 1792)
- Bulla truncatula Bruguière, 1792: synonym of Retusa truncatula (Bruguière, 1792)
- Bulla tumida A. Adams, 1850: synonym of Akera soluta (Gmelin, 1791)
- Bulla turgidula Forbes, 1844: synonym of Weinkauffia turgidula (Forbes, 1844)
- Bulla turrita Møller, 1842: synonym of Retusa obtusa (Montagu, 1803)
- Bulla umbilicata Röding, 1798 : synonym of Bulla occidentalis A. Adams, 1850
  - Distribution : Caribbean
  - Length : 17 mm
- Bulla umbilicata Montagu, 1803: synonym of Retusa umbilicata (Montagu, 1803)
- Bulla undata Bruguière, 1792: synonym of Micromelo undatus (Bruguière, 1792)
- Bulla utriculata Locard, 1886: synonym of Roxania utriculus (Brocchi, 1814)
- Bulla utriculus Brocchi, 1814: synonym of Roxania utriculus (Brocchi, 1814)
- Bulla velum Gmelin, 1791: synonym of Hydatina zonata (Lightfoot, 1786)
- Bulla velutina Müller O.F., 1776: synonym of Velutina velutina (O. F. Müller, 1776)
- Bulla verrucosa Linnaeus, 1758: synonym of Calpurnus verrucosus (Linnaeus, 1758)
- Bulla vesica Gmelin, 1791: synonym of Olivancillaria vesica (Gmelin, 1791)
- Bulla vesicaria Lightfoot, 1786: synonym of Hydatina vesicaria (Lightfoot, 1786)
- Bulla vestita Philippi, 1844: synonym of Philine retifera (Forbes, 1844)
- Bulla villosa Martyn, 1784: synonym of Bulla ampulla Linnaeus, 1758
- Bulla virginea Cantraine, 1835: synonym of Pseudosimnia adriatica Schilder, 1941: synonym of Pseudosimnia adriatica (G. B. Sowerby I, 1828)
- Bulla viridis Rang in Quoy & Gaimard, 1832: synonym of Smaragdinella calyculata (Broderip & G. B. Sowerby I, 1829)
- Bulla vitrea M. Sars, 1866: synonym of Diaphana hiemalis (Couthouy, 1839)
- Bulla voluta Quoy & Gaimard, 1833: synonym of Acteocina decorata (Pilsbry, 1904)
- Bulla volva Linnaeus, 1758: synonym of Volva volva (Linnaeus, 1758)
- Bulla zonata Lightfoot, 1786: synonym of Hydatina zonata (Lightfoot, 1786)
- Bulla zonata Turton, 1834: synonym of Scaphander lignarius (Linnaeus, 1758)
