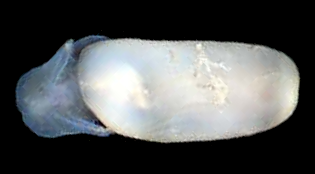
- Live Retusa sp.
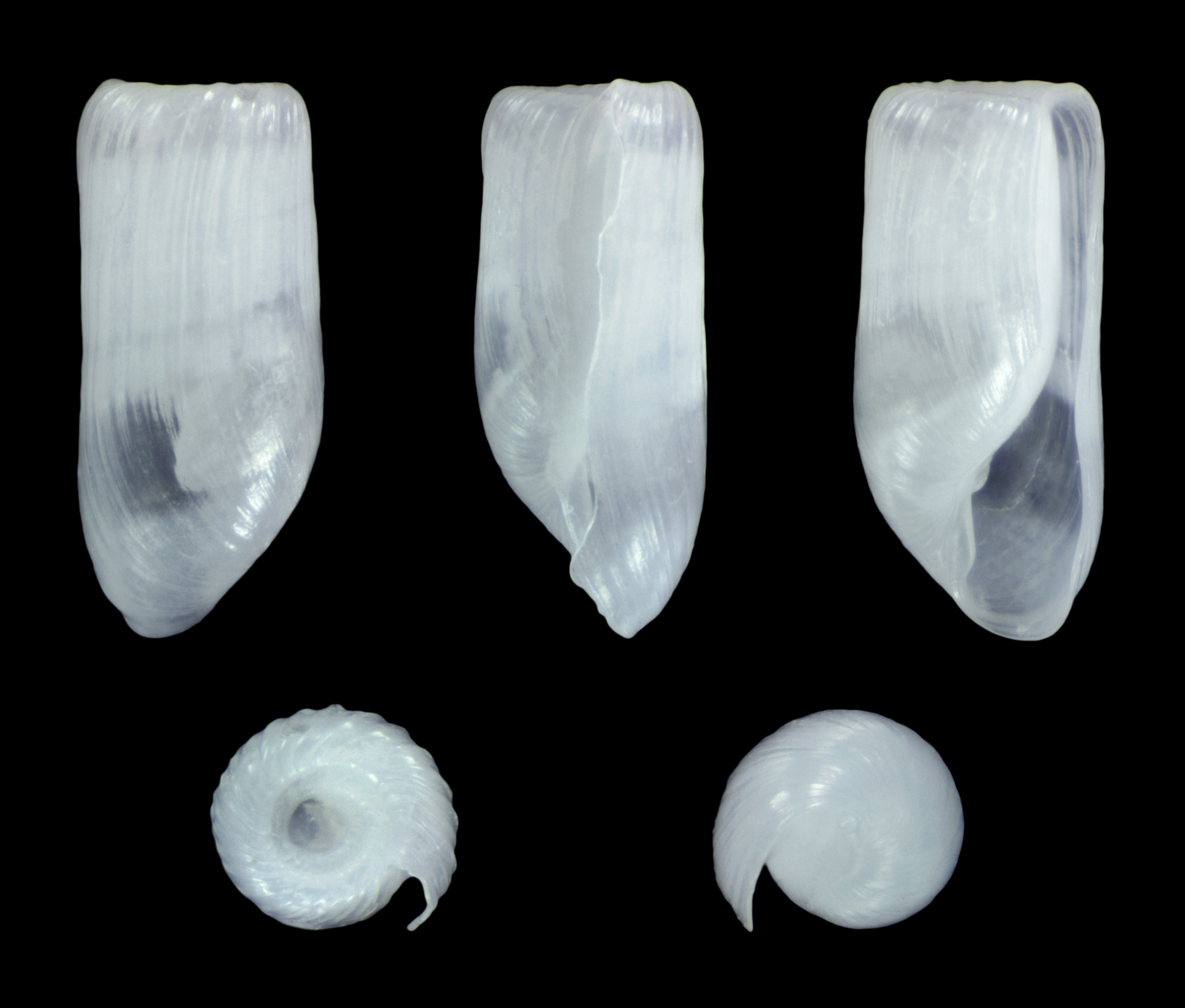
- Retusa leptoeneilema

Scientific classification
- Kingdom: Animalia
- Phylum: Mollusca
- Class: Gastropoda
- Order: Cephalaspidea
- Superfamily: Bulloidea
- Family: Retusidae
- Genus: Retusa; T. Brown, 1827

Type species
- Bulla obtusa Montagu, 1803

Synonyms
- Clistaxis Cossmann, 1895; Coleophysis P. Fischer, 1883; Cryptaxis Jeffreys, 1883; Cylichnina Monterosato, 1884; Mamilloretusa F. Nordsieck, 1972; Retua [sic] (misspelling); Retusa (Coleophysis) P. Pischer, 1883; Retusa (Cylichnina) Monterosato, 1884; Retusa (Retusa) Brown, 1827; Retusa (Sulcularia) Dall, 1921 (invalid: junior homonym of Sulcularia Rafinesque, 1831; Sulcoretusa is a replacement name); Sulcoretusa J. Q. Burch, 1945; Tornatina (Coleophysis) P. Fischer, 1883; Tornatina (Utriculus) T. Brown, 1844; Tornatina (Coleophysis) P. Fischer, 1883; Utriculus T. Brown, 1844 (Invalid: junior homonym of Utriculus Schumacher, 1817); Utriculus (Tornatina) A. Adams, 1850

= Retusa =

Genus of gastropods

Retusa is a genus of very small head-shield sea snails or barrel-bubble snails, marine gastropod molluscs in the family Retusidae.

== Species ==
Species within the genus Retusa include:

- Retusa abyssicola Valdés, 2008
- Retusa acrobeles (R. B. Watson, 1883)
- †Retusa acrochone (Cossmann & Pissarro, 1900)
- Retusa agulhasensis Thiele, 1925
- Retusa amboynensis (R. B. Watson, 1883)
- Retusa amphizosta (Watson, 1886)
- Retusa avenaria (R. B. Watson, 1883)
- Retusa atkinsoni (Tenison-Woods, 1876)
- Retusa canariensis (Nordsieck & Talavera, 1979)
- Retusa carpenteri (Hanley, 1859)
- Retusa cecillii (Philippi, 1844)
- Retusa chrysoma Burn in Burn & Bell, 1974
- Retusa chukchii Chaban, 2008
- Retusa complanata (Watson, 1883)
- Retusa concentrica (A. Adams, 1850)
- Retusa crebrisculpta (Monterosato, 1884)
- Retusa crispula (Watson, 1883)
- Retusa crossei (Bucquoy, Dautzenberg & Dollfus, 1886)
- Retusa delicatula (A. Adams, 1862)
- Retusa desgenettii (Audouin, 1826)
- Retusa diaphana Valdés, 2008
- Retusa elegantissima Habe, 1950
- †Retusa ennucleata (Powell & Bartrum, 1929)
- Retusa famelica Watson, 1883
- Retusa frielei (Dall, 1881)
- Retusa galapagana Dall, 1919
- Retusa golikovi Chaban, 2004
- Retusa insolita Valdés, 2008
- Retusa instabilis Minichev, 1971
- Retusa laevisculpta (Granata-Grillo, 1877)
- Retusa lata Chaban & Chernyshev, 2013
- Retusa lenis Valdés, 2008
- Retusa leptekes (R. B. Watson, 1883)
- Retusa leptoeneilema (Brusina, 1866)
- Retusa leuca (R. B. Watson, 1883)
- Retusa longispirata (Yamakawa, 1911)
- Retusa mammillata (Philippi, 1836)
- Retusa mariei (Dautzenberg, 1889)
- Retusa mayoi (Dall, 1889)
- Retusa minima Yamakawa, 1911
- Retusa minutissima (Monterosato, 1878)
- Retusa montereyensis Smith & Gordon, 1948
- Retusa natalensis Barnard, 1963
- Retusa nicobarica Thiele, 1925
- Retusa nitidula (Lovén, 1846)
- Retusa obtusa (Montagu, 1803)
- Retusa operculata Minichev, 1966
- Retusa opima (Finlay, 1926)
- Retusa orientalis Thiele, 1925
- Retusa oruaensis (Webster, 1908)
- Retusa orycta (R. B. Watson, 1883)
- †Retusa otahuhuensis (Laws, 1950)
- Retusa oviformis Thiele, 1925
- Retusa ovoides (Milaschewitsch, 1916)
- Retusa ovulina Lin, 1991
- Retusa parvula (Jeffreys, 1883)
- Retusa paziana Dall, 1919
- Retusa pelyx Burn in Burn & Bell, 1974
- Retusa perforata Thiele, 1925
- Retusa pervia (Dall, 1889)
- Retusa pharetra Hedley, 1909
- †Retusa pressa Marwick, 1928
- Retusa protumida (Hedley, 1903)
- Retusa pseudoglobosa Nomura, 1939
- Retusa pygmaea (A. Adams, 1850)
- Retusa sakuraii (Habe, 1958)
- Retusa sculpta (Gatliff & Gabriel, 1913)
- †Retusa segnis (Laws, 1940)
- Retusa siberutensis Thiele, 1925
- †Retusa soror (Suter, 1917)
- Retusa sosa Ev. Marcus & Er. Marcus, 1969
- Retusa spatha (R. B. Watson, 1883)
- Retusa striata (Hutton, 1873)
- Retusa succincta (A. Adams, 1862)
- Retusa sulcata (d'Orbigny, 1841)
- Retusa sulcata (Watson, 1883) is a secondary junior homonym of Retusa sulcata (d'Orbigny, 1841). No replacement name has been proposed, but the systematics of these small cephalaspids is very confused, and both species may end up in different genera after a proper re-evaluation of their status.
- Retusa sumatrana Thiele, 1925
- Retusa tarutana Smythe, 1979
- Retusa tenerifensis (Nordsieck & Talavera, 1979)
- Retusa tornata (Watson, 1886)
- Retusa toyamaensis (Habe, 1955)
- Retusa trunca Valdés, 2008
- Retusa truncatula (Bruguière, 1792)
- Retusa turrigera Melvill, 1910
- Retusa umbilicata (Montagu, 1803)
- Retusa variabilis (Milaschewitsch, 1912)
- Retusa waughiana Hedley, 1899
- Retusa xystrum Dall, 1919

Taxa inquirenda

- Retusa bysma Melvill, 1904
- Retusa candidula (Locard, 1892) (taxon inquirendum, name is based on a junior primary homonym.)
- Retusa ennurensis Preston, 1916
- Retusa multiquadrata Oberling, 1970 (taxon inquirendum; needs investigation)
- Retusa obesa (Locard, 1897)
- Retusa pusillina (Locard, 1897)
- Retusa robagliana (P. Fischer, 1869) (taxon inquirendum)
- Retusa semen (Reeve, 1855) (taxon inquirendum)

Species brought into synonymy

- Retusa alayoi (Espinosa & Ortea, 2004): synonym of Colinatys alayoi (Espinosa & Ortea, 2004)
- Retusa anderssoni Strebel, 1908: synonym of Diaphana anderssoni (Strebel, 1908)
- Retusa antarctica Melvill & Standen, 1912: synonym of Diaphana paessleri (Strebel, 1905)
- Retusa apiculata (Tate, 1879): synonym of Tornatina apiculata (Tate, 1879): synonym of Acteocina apiculata (Tate, 1879)
- Retusa bizona (A. Adams, 1850): synonym of Mnestia girardi (Audouin, 1826)
- Retusa caelata (Bush, 1885): synonym of Pyrunculus caelatus (Bush, 1885)
- Retusa carinensis de Gregorio, 1889: synonym of Retusa truncatula (Bruguière, 1792)
- Retusa cumberlandiana Strebel, 1908: synonym of Cylichna cumberlandiana (Strebel, 1908)
- Retusa desgenettesi (Audouin, 1827): synonym of Retusa desgenettii (Audouin, 1826)
- Retusa dilatata Pallary, 1904: synonym of Retusa truncatula (Bruguière, 1792)
- Retusa domita (Dall, 1889): synonym of Cylichnium domitum (Dall, 1908)
- Retusa eumicra (Crosse in Crosse & Fischer, 1865): synonym of Tornatina eumicra (Crosse, 1865): synonym of Acteocina eumicra (Crosse, 1865)
- Retusa fourierii (Audouin, 1826): synonym of Pyrunculus fourierii (Audouin, 1826)
- Retusa frigida Hedley, 1916: synonym of Diaphana paessleri (Strebel, 1905)
- Retusa gaimardi Finlay, 1927: synonym of Acteocina decorata (Pilsbry, 1904)
- Retusa girardi (Audouin, 1826): synonym of Ventomnestia girardi (Audouin, 1826)
- Retusa gordonis Yokoyama, 1927: synonym of Acteocina gordonis (Yokoyama, 1927)
- Retusa inflata Strebel, 1908: synonym of Diaphana inflata (Strebel, 1908)
- Retusa insignis (Pilsbry, 1904): synonym of Decorifer insignis (Pilsbry, 1904)
- Retusa lactea (Jeffreys, 1877): synonym of Diaphana lactea (Jeffreys, 1877)
- Retusa mariateresae Parenzan, 1970: synonym of Bulla striata Bruguière, 1792
- Retusa marshalli Sykes, 1904: synonym of Diaphana marshalli (Sykes, 1904)
- Retusa matusimana Nomura, 1939: synonym of Decorifer matusimanus (Nomura, 1939)
- Retusa obtusata: synonym of Retusa obtusa (Montagu, 1803)
- Retusa pellucida (T. Brown, 1827): synonym of Retusa truncatula (Bruguière, 1792)
- Retusa pertenuis (Mighels, 1843): synonym of Retusa obtusa (Montagu, 1803)
- Retusa pfefferi Strebel, 1908: synonym of Diaphana pfefferi (Strebel, 1908)
- Retusa piriformis Nordsieck, 1972: synonym of Retusa truncatula (Bruguière, 1792)
- Retusa semen Thiele, 1925: synonym of Pyrunculus pyriformis (A. Adams, 1850)
- Retusa semisulcata (Philippi, 1836): synonym of Retusa truncatula (Bruguière, 1792)
- Retusa strigella (Lovén, 1846): synonym of Cylichnina umbilicata (Montagu, 1803): synonym of Retusa umbilicata (Montagu, 1803)
- Retusa subcylindrica (Brown, 1827): synonym of Cylichnina umbilicata (Montagu, 1803): synonym of Retusa umbilicata (Montagu, 1803)
- Retusa tohokuensis Nomura, 1939: synonym of Acteocina tohokuensis (Nomura, 1939)
- Retusa truncatoides Nomura, 1939: synonym of Acteocina truncatoides (Nomura, 1939)
- Retusa turrita Møller, 1842: synonym of Retusa obtusa (Montagu, 1803)
