= Basal retinal neuron =

A basal retinal neuron (BRN) is a type of photosensitive neuron believed to be the initiator of compound action potentials (CAPs) in the optic nerve of the Bulla. There are approximately 100 BRNs in each Bulla eye, allowing for easy re-identification of studied cells. BRNs fire synchronously to produce a CAP, which is a result of the summation of many synchronized action potentials from individual neuron cells. These CAPs create an impulse in the optic nerve. Each eye in the Bulla is coupled to the other eye through the production of CAPs in the optic nerve. CAPs are an ideal output as they are expressed as large spontaneous impulses, are biphasic, and are recorded extracellularly, giving scientists an easy way to determine whether these cells are “on” or “off." Additionally, CAPs in the Bulla eye demonstrate rhythmic behavior with a near-24 hour period.

In Bulla, CAPs are most abundant in the late subjective night and decrease nearly twofold in conductance at dawn. Circadian cycles in membrane potential, which are caused by rhythmic changes in membrane conductance, affect the membrane permeability of calcium ions in the BRNs. To test the necessity of increased calcium ion conductance, researchers treated BRNs with EGTA, an aminopolycarboxylic acid that “traps” calcium ions and prevents their movement into the cell. Previous experiments showed that light exposure and inducing potassium conductance were sufficient to shift circadian rhythm; however, when EGTA was used in addition to these methods, no circadian shift was observed. This experiment provided support for the necessity of calcium permeability in circadian pacemaker function and ability to match organism activity to environmental light cycles in the Bulla. Together with the ease of re-identification of BRNs, ease of recording, and reliability of circadian CAP production, Bullas are an excellent model to provide insight into the chronobiology, or “time-biology,” of molluscs.

Bulla, specifically, Bulla gouldiana, are model organisms to study circadian rhythms as they are easy to maintain in a laboratory settings, have re-identifiable large cells, and display measurable circadian behaviors. Compared to other mollusks and organisms of study in circadian biology, the retina of the Bulla contains a small number of relatively large neurons. This allows for easier surgical manipulation and distinction between populations of cells and longer intracellular recording time. Since chronobiological studies often require multiple days of recording, the ease of access facilitates data acquisition.

== Discovery of cell-autonomous pacemaker ==
The eyes of the Bulla exhibit circadian rhythms in the firing of their optic nerves; however, up until the end of the 20th century, the mechanism was unknown. In the 1980s, Gene D. Block conducted extensive research on circadian rhythms in Bulla eyes. In 1982, he ruled out photoreceptor cells as regulators of circadian rhythms, and concluded the pacemaking cells must be in the retina. In 1984, Block and a team of students conducted 74 hour intracellular recordings of Bulla BRNs in constant darkness. This experiment was crucial in determining whether BRNs functioned as a circadian pacemaker, as a loss of rhythm in darkness would indicate the absence of an internal clock and that Bulla are simply following light cues. They found clear circadian rhythms in both membrane potential and frequency of action potential firing in constant darkness, which directly correlated with rhythmic CAP firing in the optic nerve. This indicated that the network that comprised the BRNs and produced CAPs contained a circadian oscillator. In 1993, Block’s lab isolated BRNs in vitro and found that they individually exhibited the same circadian rhythmicity in membrane conductance, thereby generating oscillations in membrane potential. Subsequently, the BRNs proved to be sufficient at photoentrainment, the process of matching an organism’s activity to the light and dark patterns in its environment. The findings that indicated BRNs were both individually intrinsically rhythmic and photo-entrainable led to the conclusion that BRNs function as cell-autonomous pacemakers in the Bulla. This was the first time individual neurons were found to be capable of functioning as circadian pacemakers.

The discovery of a cell autonomous pacemaker served as a stepping stone in the field of chronobiology, as there were few circadian pacemakers known to be localized to specific regions, let alone to specific autonomous cells in vitro. It would take another sixteen years before cell-autonomous pacemakers comprising the mammalian clock in the SCN were discovered.

== Coupling mechanism of circadian oscillator in eyes ==
Although each eye of the Bulla gouldiana contains an autonomous circadian pacemaker, these pacemakers do not function entirely in isolation. In 1983, Roberts and Block demonstrated that the two eyes are mutually coupled through the optic nerves. When the optic nerves were surgically severed, the eyes continued to generate circadian rhythms in compound action potentials (CAPs), but over time their phases diverged. This phase desynchronization provided strong evidence that the two pacemakers are normally kept in synchrony through neural communication, rather than through entrainment to a common external cue. The study offered one of the first clear demonstrations of inter-oscillator coupling in a circadian system and underscored how local pacemakers can be coordinated to produce coherent output across tissues.

Recent research has explored the relationship between paired circadian oscillators located in each of the snail’s eyes. A 2024 study conducted dual-eye experiments and found that each eye contains an independent circadian oscillator capable of entraining to environmental cues. When the periods of the two oscillators were experimentally altered, their ability to synchronize – or failure to do so – provided insight into coupled oscillator theory, a framework also applied to mammalian clocks like the SCN.
