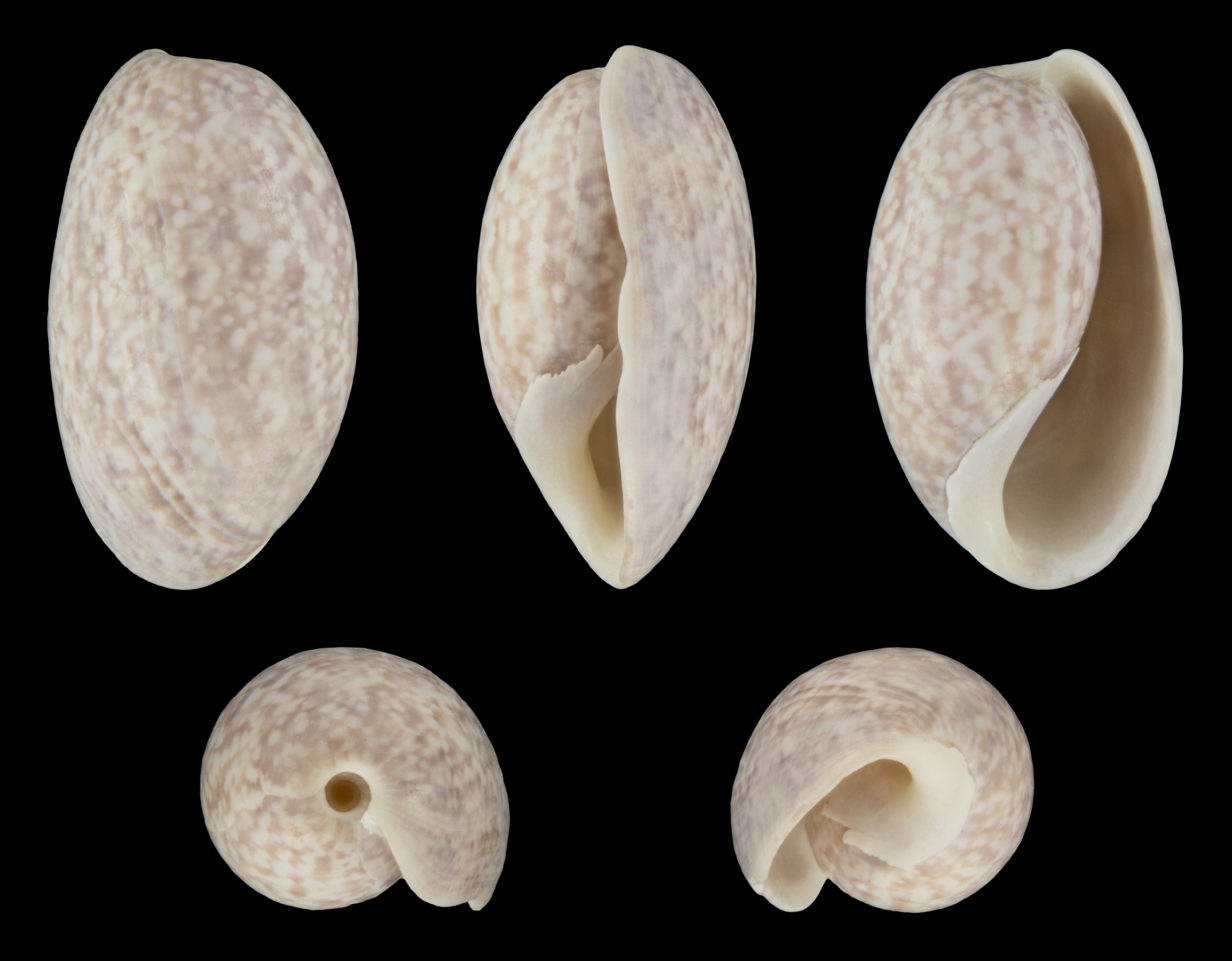
- Shell of Bulla occidentalis

Scientific classification
- Kingdom: Animalia
- Phylum: Mollusca
- Class: Gastropoda
- Order: Cephalaspidea
- Superfamily: Bulloidea
- Family: Bullidae
- Genus: Bulla
- Species: B. occidentalis

Binomial name
- Bulla occidentalis A. Adams, 1850

Synonyms
- Bulla nux Menke, 1853; Bulla rubiginosa Gould, 1852; Bulla sulcata Menke, 1853; Bulla umbilicata Röding, 1798 (Invalid name: ICZN Opinion 549)

= Bulla occidentalis =

Species of mollusc

Bulla occidentalis is a species of mollusc in the genus Bulla.

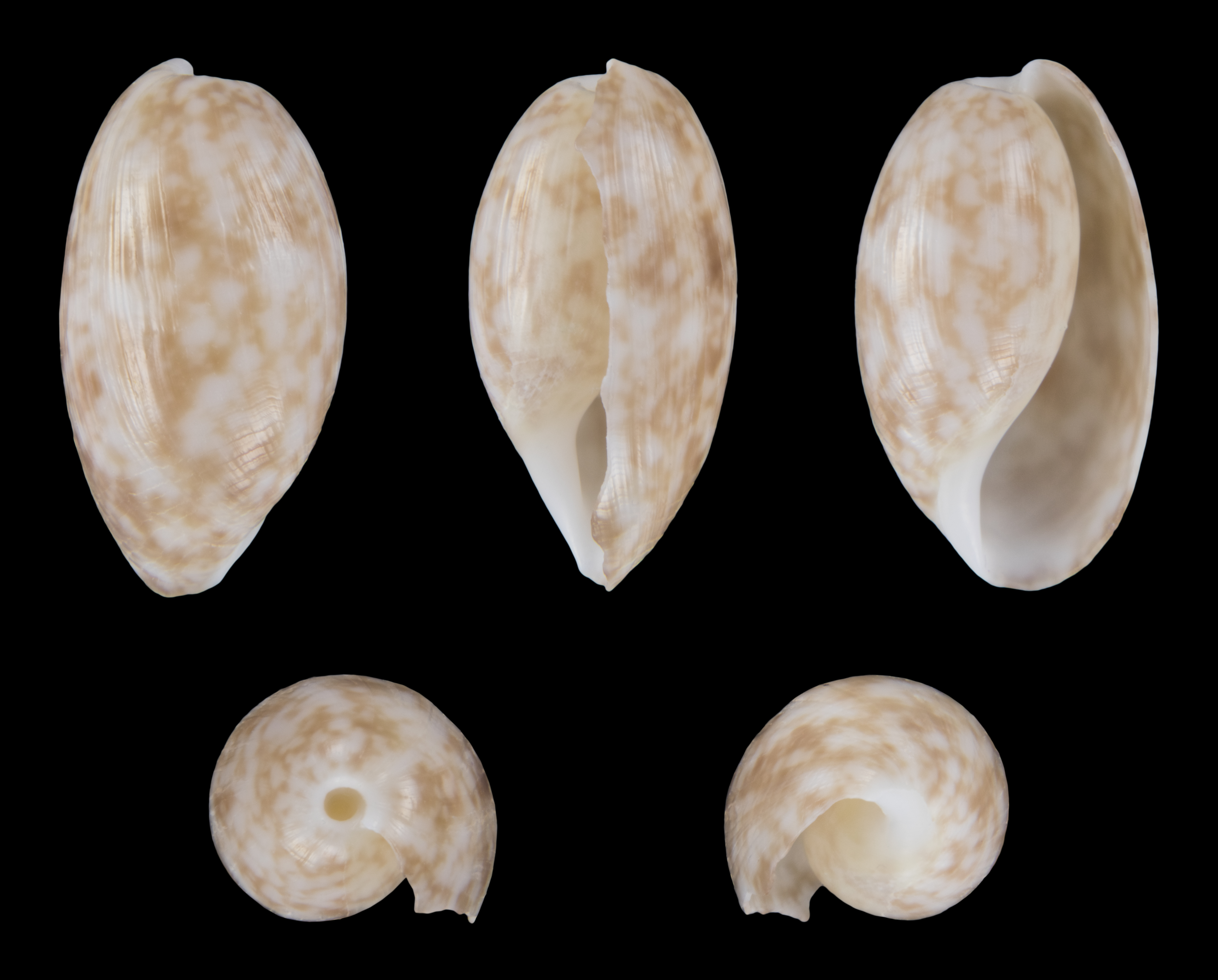
Juvenile

== Distribution ==
This marine species occurs off St. Vincent, West Indies
