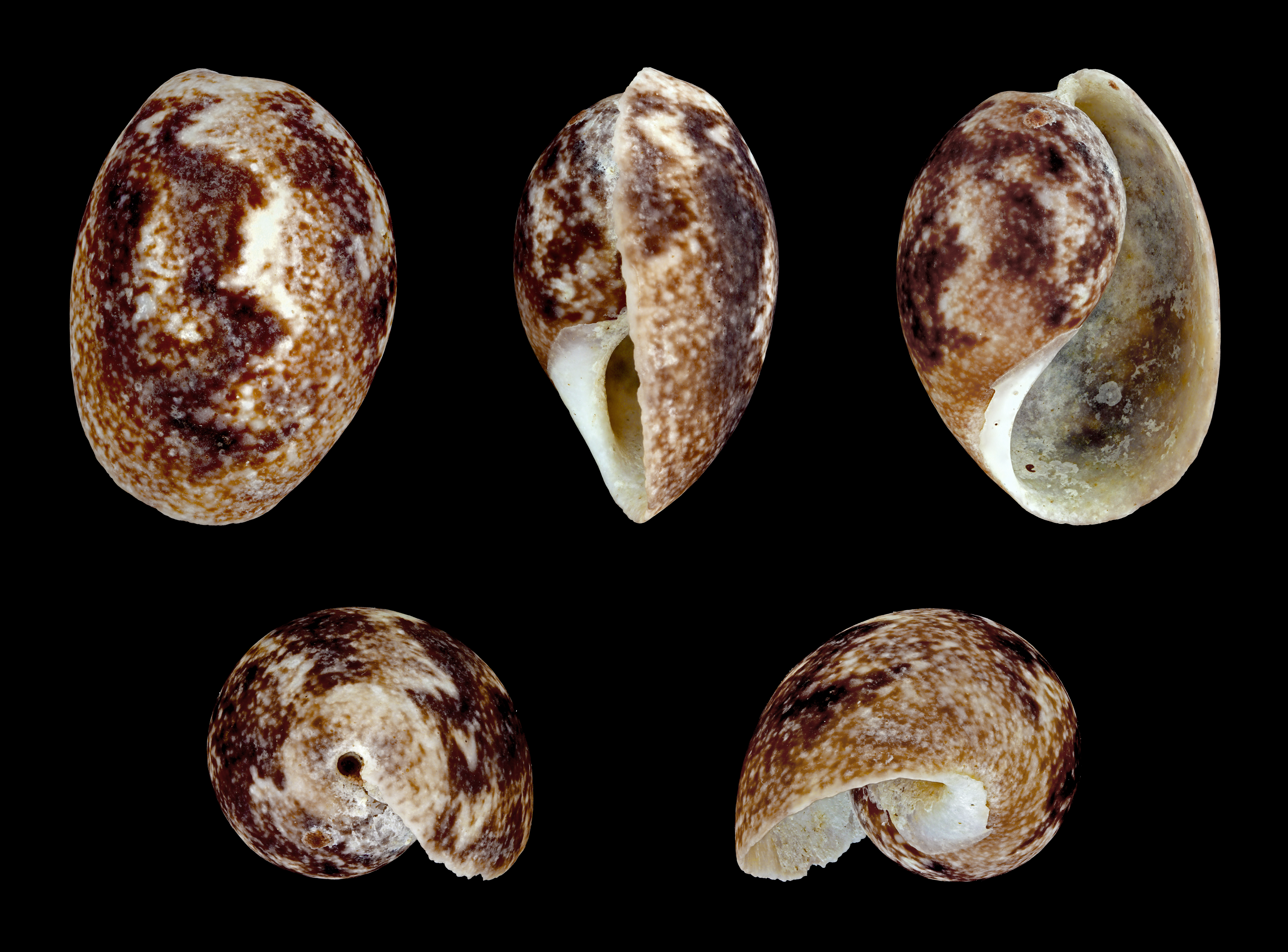

Scientific classification
- Kingdom: Animalia
- Phylum: Mollusca
- Class: Gastropoda
- Order: Cephalaspidea
- Family: Bullidae
- Genus: Bulla
- Species: B. ampulla

Binomial name
- Bulla ampulla Linnaeus, 1758

= Bulla ampulla =

Species of gastropod

Bulla ampulla is a species of gastropods belonging to the family Bullidae.

The species has cosmopolitan distribution (except the Americas).

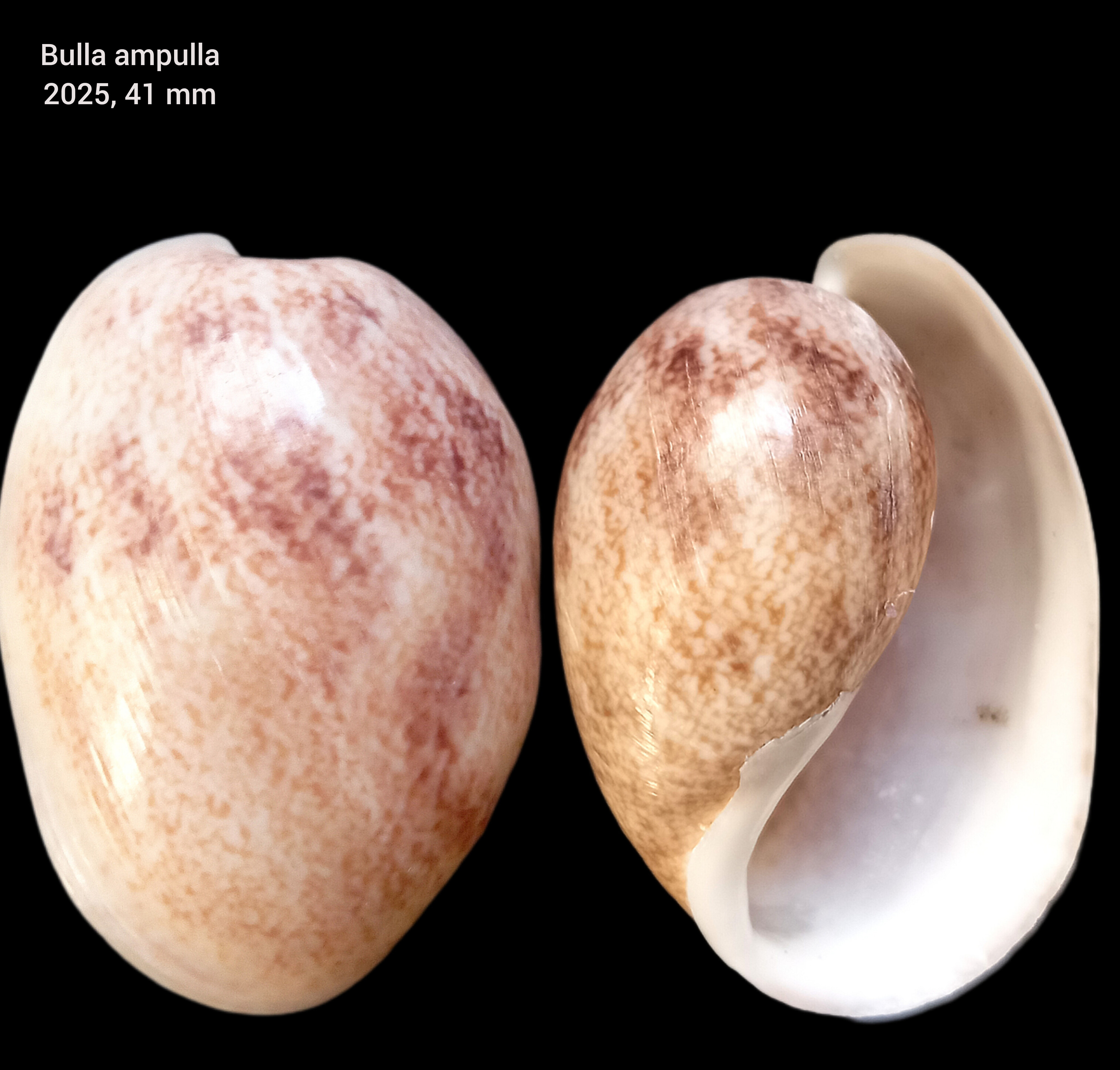
Bulla ampulla
