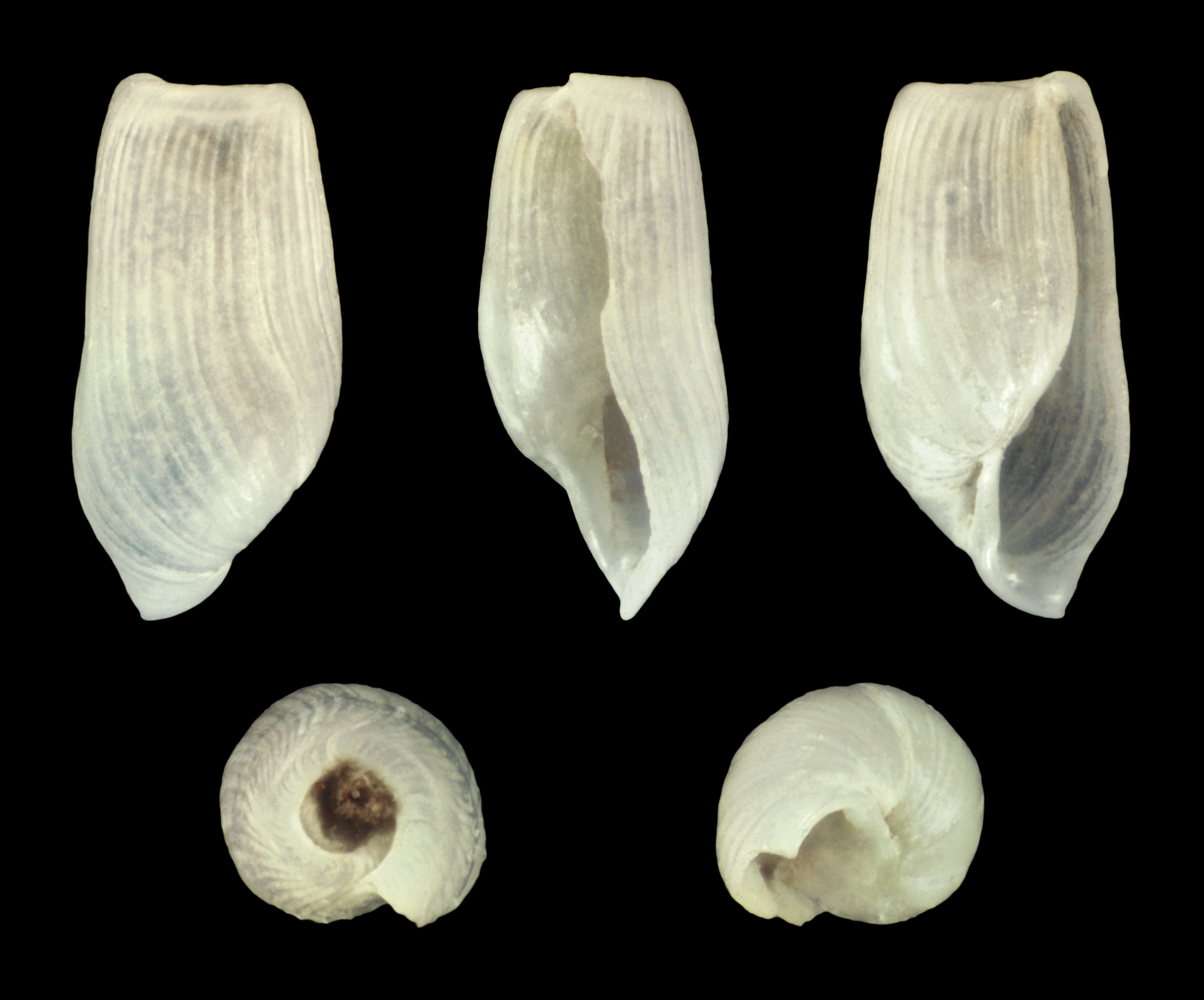

Scientific classification
- Kingdom: Animalia
- Phylum: Mollusca
- Class: Gastropoda
- Order: Cephalaspidea
- Family: Retusidae
- Genus: Retusa
- Species: R. truncatula

Binomial name
- Retusa truncatula (Bruguière, 1792)

Synonyms
- Bulla pellucida Brown, 1827: Bulla retusa Maton & Rackett, 1807; Bulla semisulcata Philippi, 1836; Bulla truncata Adams J., 1800; Bulla truncatula Bruguière, 1792 (original combination); Coleophysis effusa Monterosato, 1890 (dubious synonym); Cylichna truncatella Locard, 1886; Retusa (Coleophysis) piriformis Nordsieck, 1972; Retusa carinensis de Gregorio, 1889; Retusa dilatata Pallary, 1904 (dubious synonym); Retusa dilatata var. minor Pallary, 1904 (dubious synonym); Retusa piriformis Nordsieck, 1972; Retusa semisulcata (Philippi, 1836); Utriculus truncatulus (Bruguière, 1792); Utriculus truncatulus var. pellucida (Brown, 1827); Volvaria pellucida Brown, 1827

= Retusa truncatula =

Species of marine gastropod mollusc in the family Retusidae

Retusa truncatula is a species of very small head-shield sea snail or barrel-bubble snail, a marine gastropod mollusc in the family Retusidae.

The subspecies Retusa truncatula var. mammilata: is a synonym of Retusa mammillata (Philippi, 1836)

== Description ==
The shell is minute with a flattened spire and longitudinal striations. The colour of the living animal is white. The adult length is usually less than 4 mm.

== Distribution ==
This species occurs in South Africa, from False Bay to Durban in shallow estuaries. It is also known from northern Europe, the Mediterranean Sea and the Canary Islands.

== Natural history ==
This small sea snail lives from the intertidal zone to just below the low water mark. It burrows in the mud or sand of tidal marshes, and feeds on foraminiferans.
