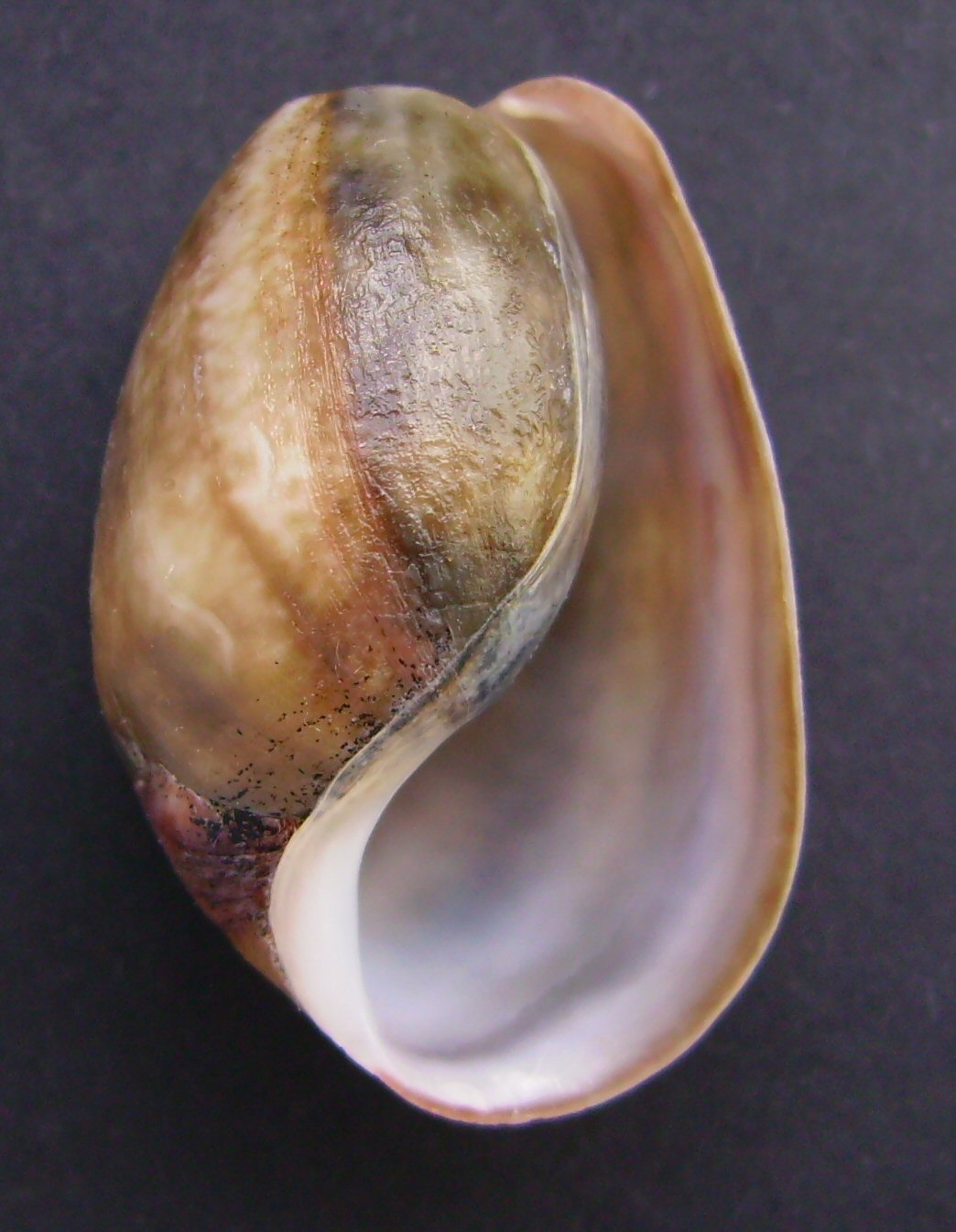

Scientific classification
- Kingdom: Animalia
- Phylum: Mollusca
- Class: Gastropoda
- Order: Cephalaspidea
- Family: Bullidae
- Genus: Bulla
- Species: B. quoyii

Binomial name
- Bulla quoyii Gray, 1943

Synonyms
- Bulla australis Gray, 1825 (Invalid: junior homonym of Bulla australis Férussac, 1822); Bulla australis Quoy & Gaimard, 1833 (Invalid: junior homonym of Bulla australis Férussac, 1822, and B. australis Gray, 1825); Bulla botanica Hedley, 1918 (Nom. nov. pro Bulla australis Gray, 1825, non Férussac, 1822); Bulla castanea A. Adams, 1850; Bulla dubiosa Mabille, 1896; Bulla oblonga A. Adams, 1850; Bulla substriata Menke, 1853; Bulla tenuissima Sowerby, 1868; Quibulla botanica (Hedley, 1918); Quibulla quoyii (Gray, 1843)

= Bulla quoyii =

Species of gastropod

Bulla quoyii, the brown bubble snail, is a species of sea snail, a marine gastropod mollusc in the family Bullidae, the bubble snails.

== Description ==
The size of an adult shell varies between 35 and 55 mm. The thin, yellowish-brown shell has an elongated to ovate-quadrangular shape and shows anterior spiral grooves. The shell is wider on the front side. The white aperture becomes narrower at its top. The spire contains six or seven whorls with raised striae. The lip is pale brown. The columella is white. The color of the periostracum varies from greenish to orange. For the actual animal, the body including the foot, head shield, and eye stalks are a very light beige color with a reddish area appearing around the base of the shield. https://www.mollusca.co.nz/speciesdetail.php?taxa=3791

== Distribution ==
This species occurs in the North Island of New Zealand and southern Australia, northern Tasmania, and the Kermadec Islands. Bulla quoyii prefers sub to intertidal areas with sandy or rocky bottoms.

== Diet ==
Bulla quoyii is a grazer feeding primarily on Algae however it also occasionally consumes Ulva or the film layer of different sea grasses.

== Breeding ==
Bulla quoyii is a hermaphrodite species that lays an ovoid consisting of a jelly like protective layer and the spiral shaped eggs that appear in a reddish, orange color.
