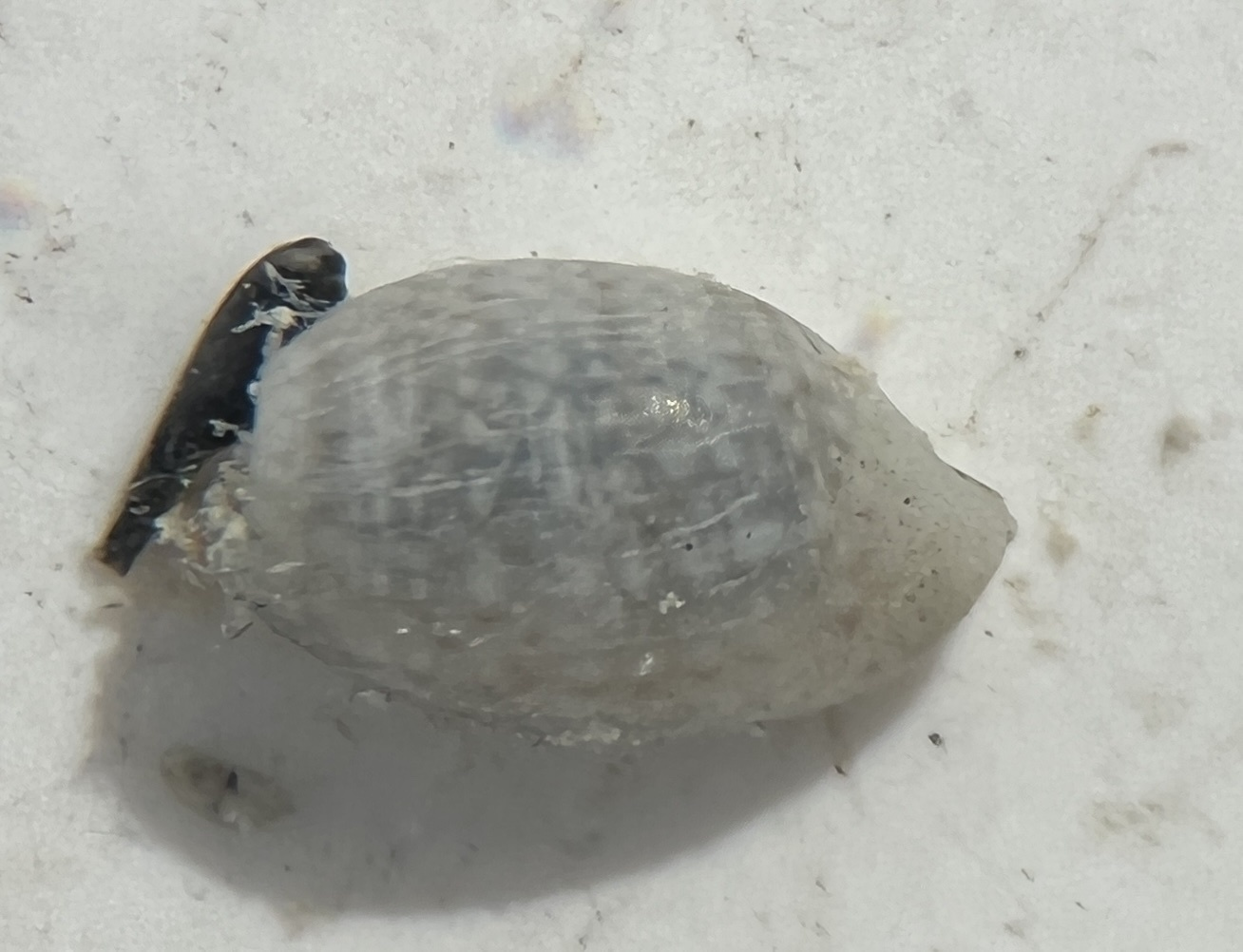

Scientific classification
- Kingdom: Animalia
- Phylum: Mollusca
- Class: Gastropoda
- Order: Cephalaspidea
- Family: Haminoeidae
- Genus: Haminoea
- Species: H. antillarum

Binomial name
- Haminoea antillarum (Orbigny, 1841)

Synonyms
- Bulla antillarum Orbigny, 1841; Bulla cerina Menke, 1853; Haminea guadaloupensis G. B. Sowerby II, 1868

= Haminoea antillarum =

Species of gastropod

Haminoea antillarum, the Antilles paper bubble or Antilles glassy bubble, is a species of sea snail in the family Haminoeidae.

== Distribution ==
This species occurs in the Caribbean Sea off East Florida, in the United States to Colombia. It has been found off Cuba and the Virgin Islands and in the Atlantic Ocean off Eastern Brazil.

== Description ==
The length of the shell varies between 7 and 20 mm (0.28 and 0.79 in). The species' diet consists of seagrass and is generally found 0–2 meters (0.0–6.6 ft) deep in the ocean.
