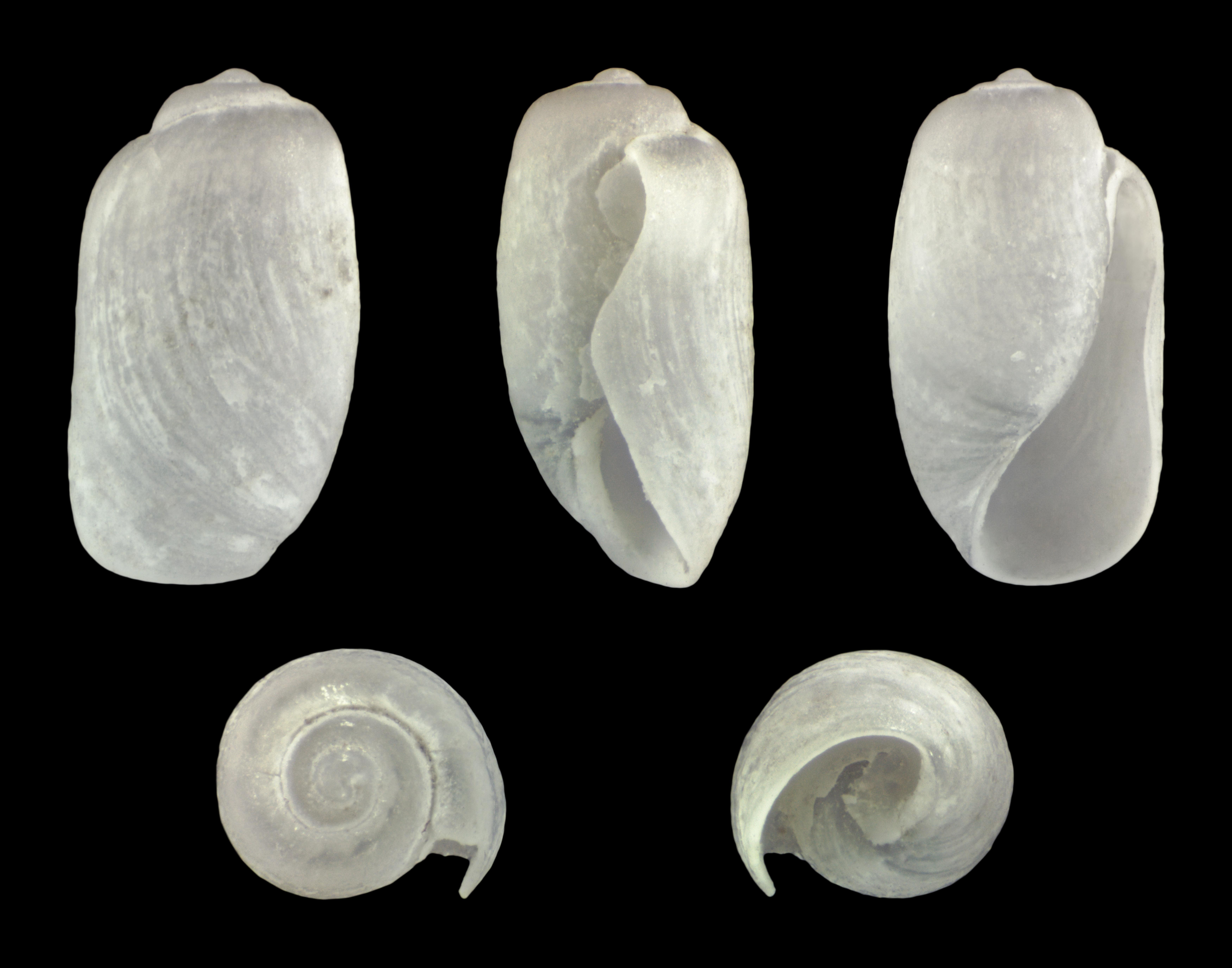
- A shell of Retusa obtusa

Scientific classification
- Kingdom: Animalia
- Phylum: Mollusca
- Class: Gastropoda
- Order: Cephalaspidea
- Family: Retusidae
- Genus: Retusa
- Species: R. obtusa

Binomial name
- Retusa obtusa (Montagu, 1803)

= Retusa obtusa =

Species of gastropod

Retusa obtusa, common name Arctic barrel-bubble, is a species of very small head-shield sea snail or bubble shell, a marine gastropod mollusc in the family Retusidae.

This species occurs widely in the northern parts of the Atlantic Ocean, occurring in both the Eastern Atlantic and Western Atlantic. It has also been reported from North Carolina, and from Alaska in the Pacific Ocean. The shell reaches a maximum size of 3 mm.
