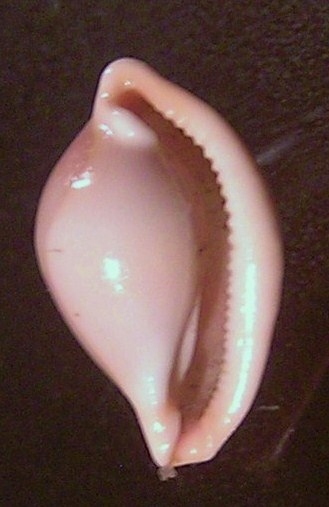
- Ventral view of a shell of Pseudosimnia carnea

Scientific classification
- Kingdom: Animalia
- Phylum: Mollusca
- Class: Gastropoda
- Subclass: Caenogastropoda
- Order: Littorinimorpha
- Family: Ovulidae
- Genus: Pseudosimnia
- Species: P. carnea

Binomial name
- Pseudosimnia carnea (Poiret, 1789)

Synonyms
- Bulla carnea Poiret, 1789; Bulla lepida Dillwyn, 1817; Bulla nucleus Dillwyn, 1817; Ovula alba Scacchi in Bucquoy, Dautzenberg & Dollfus, 1883; Ovula albida Monterosato, 1875; Ovula carnea (Poiret, 1789); Ovula carnea var. alba Bucquoy, Dautzenberg & Dollfus, 1883; Ovula carnea var. albida Monterosato, 1875; Ovula carnea var. elongata Pallary, 1900 (invalid: junior homonym of Ovula elongata d'Archiac, 1854); Ovula carnea var. gibbosa Coen, 1933; Ovula carnea var. globosa Pallary, 1900; Ovula carnea var. major Pallary, 1900; Ovula carnea var. minor Pallary, 1900; Ovula carnea var. obtusula Pallary, 1900; Ovula carnea var. pallida Bucquoy, Dautzenberg & Dollfus, 1883; Ovula carnea var. rosea Requien, 1848; Ovula carnea var. rubra Bucquoy, Dautzenberg & Dollfus, 1883; Ovula carnea var. violacea Pallary, 1900; Ovula cepula Schumacher, 1817; Ovula dentata Fischer, 1807; Ovula elongata Pallary, 1900; Ovula globosa Pallary, 1900; Ovula major Pallary, 1900; Ovula minor Pallary, 1900; Ovula nucleus Mawe, 1823; Ovula obtusula Pallary, 1900; Ovula pallida Bucquoy, Dautzenberg & Dollfus, 1883; Ovula rosea Requien, 1848; Ovula rubra Bucquoy, Dautzenberg & Dollfus, 1883; Ovula rufula Mollerat, 1890; Ovula triticea da Costa in Tryon, 1885; Ovula violacea Pallary, 1900; Primovula carnea (Poiret, 1789); Primovula carnea var. dorsolirata Coen, 1949

= Pseudosimnia carnea =

* Of gastropod

Pseudosimnia carnea, common name the dwarf red egg shell, is a species of sea snail, a marine gastropod mollusk in the family Ovulidae, the ovulids, cowry allies or false cowries.

The subspecies Pseudosimnia carnea expallescens Schilder, 1967 is a taxon inquirendum.

== Description ==
The size of the shell varies between 8 mm and 19 mm. It is toothed on its thick inner lip.

== Distribution ==
This * Occurs in the Mediterranean Sea, off Northwest Africa (Senegal); off the West Indies.
