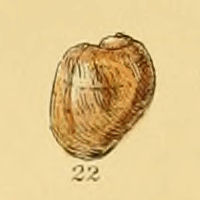

Scientific classification
- Kingdom: Animalia
- Phylum: Mollusca
- Class: Gastropoda
- Subclass: Caenogastropoda
- Order: Littorinimorpha
- Family: Velutinidae
- Genus: Velutina
- Species: V. plicatilis

Binomial name
- Velutina plicatilis (Müller, 1776)

Synonyms
- Velutina flexilis (Montagu, 1808)

= Velutina plicatilis =

Species of gastropod

Velutina plicatilis is a species of small sea snail, a marine gastropod mollusk in the family Velutinidae.

== Distribution ==
The distribution of Velutina plicatilis is circumboreal. The range of Velutina plicatilis include: 75°N to 45°N; 87°W to 0°W.

Distribution of Velutina plicatilis include:

- Greenland: West Greenland and East Greenland
- Canada: Devon Island, Newfoundland, Nova Scotia
- Irish Exclusive economic Zone
- North coast of Spain
- North Sea
- North West Atlantic
- West coast of Scotland

Velutina plicatilis is not common.

== Description ==
The maximum recorded shell length is 27 mm.

== Habitat ==
Minimum recorded depth is 10 m. Maximum recorded depth is 329 m.
