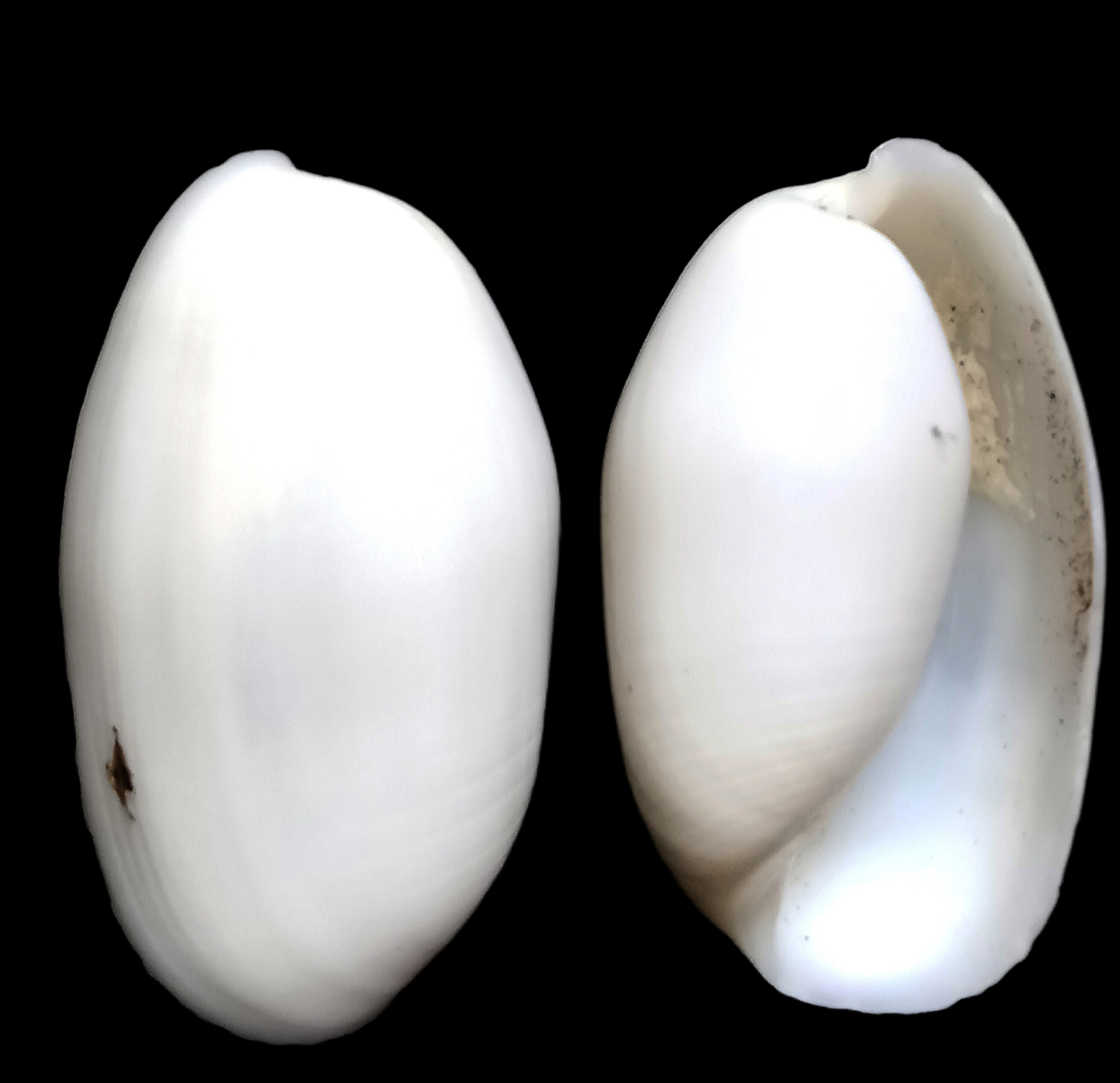

Scientific classification
- Domain: Eukaryota
- Kingdom: Animalia
- Phylum: Mollusca
- Class: Gastropoda
- Order: Cephalaspidea
- Family: Haminoeidae
- Genus: Aliculastrum
- Species: A. cylindricum

Binomial name
- Aliculastrum cylindricum (Helbling, 1779)
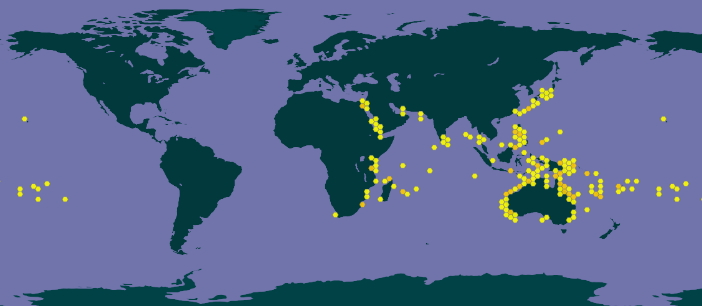

Synonyms
- Atys cylindraeus [sic] (misspelling); Atys cylindrica [sic] (incorrect gender ending); Atys cylindricus (Helbling, 1779); Atys elongata (A. Adams, 1850); Atys extensa H. J. Finlay, 1927 (replacement name for Bulla elongata A. Adams, 1850, not Phillips, 1835); Atys martensi Kobelt, 1895 (junior synonym); Bulla (Atys) elongata A. Adams, 1850; Bulla candidula Deshayes, 1833; Bulla cylindrica Helbling, 1779 (original combination); Bulla elongata A. Adams, 1850 junior subjective synonym (invalid: not Bronn, 1831); Bulla solida Dillwyn, 1817; Bulla succisa A. Adams, 1850

= Aliculastrum cylindricum =

Species of gastropod

Aliculastrum cylindricum, (common names: cylindrical atys, cylindrical true bubble, silkworm shell), is a species of gastropods belonging to the family Haminoeidae.

== Description ==
The length of the shell reaches 25.7 millimetres (1.01 in).

(Described as Bulla elongata) The shell is subcylindrical, tapering toward the anterior, with a white, slightly translucent, and glossy surface. It features transverse striations at both the anterior and posterior ends, while the central area is polished and smooth. The outer lip is prominently twisted and extended at the posterior end, while the inner lip is somewhat flattened toward the anterior, with a subtle fold.

== Distribution ==
The marine species has a wide distribution and is found in the Indian and Pacific Oceans, the Red Sea, and off the coast of Australia.
