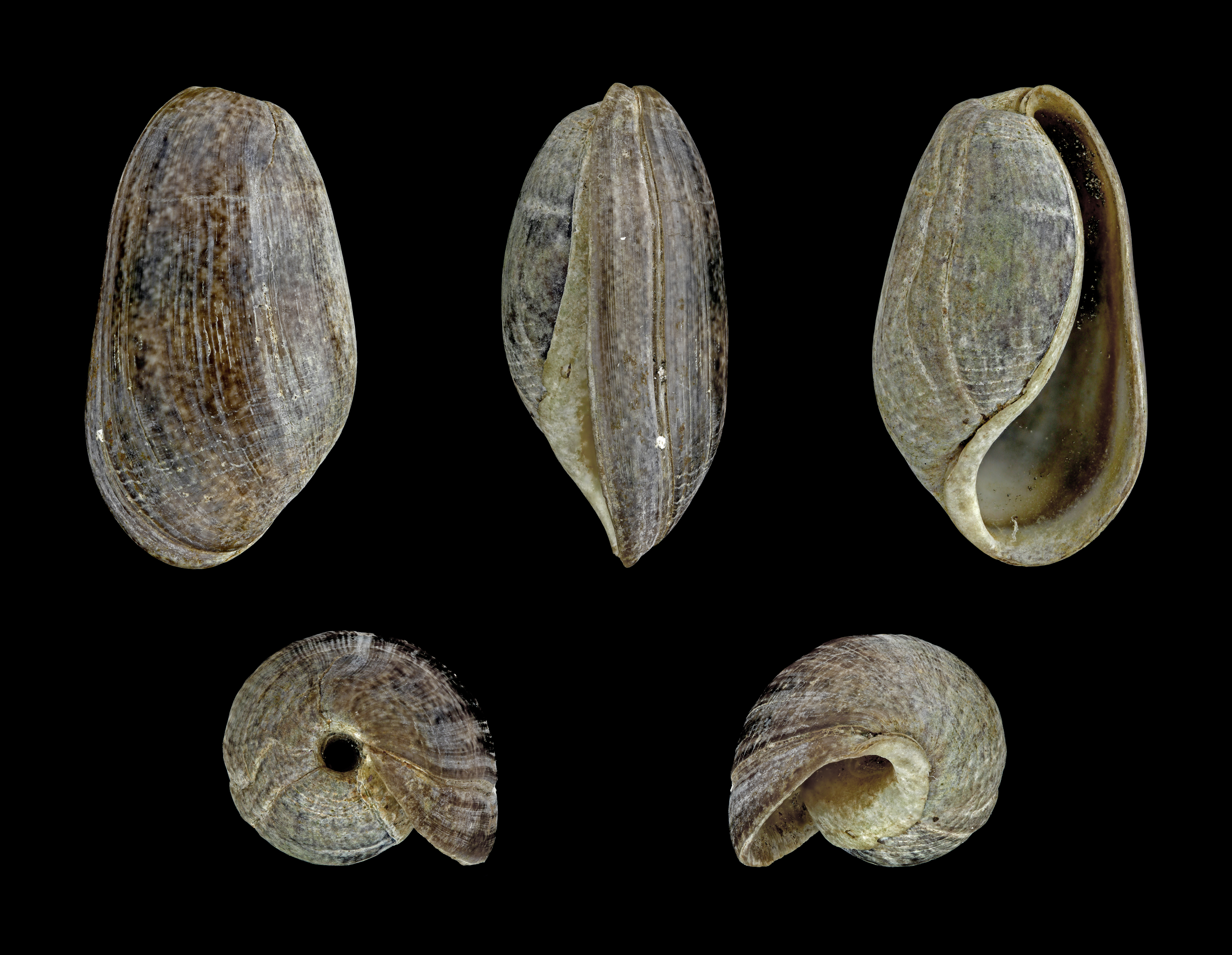

Scientific classification
- Kingdom: Animalia
- Phylum: Mollusca
- Class: Gastropoda
- Order: Cephalaspidea
- Family: Bullidae
- Genus: Bulla
- Species: B. striata

Binomial name
- Bulla striata Bruguière, 1792

Synonyms
- Bulla (Bullea) dactylis Menke, 1853 (synonym); Bulla adansonii Philippi, 1847; Bulla adansonii var. minor Dunker, 1853; Bulla alba Turton, 1825 (synonym); Bulla amygdala Dillwyn, 1817 (incorrect subsequent spelling of amygdalus); Bulla amygdalum Dillwyn, 1817; Bulla amygdalus Dillwyn, 1817; Bulla columnae Delle Chiaje, 1827; Bulla dactylis Menke, 1853; Bulla omphalodes Menke, 1853; Bulla perdicinia Menke, 1853; Bulla roperiana Pilsbry, 1895; Bulla striata striata Bruguière, 1792 accepted, alternate representation; Bulla striata var. minor Pallary, 1938; Bulla striata var. solida Monterosato, 1884; Bulla striata var. stricta Monterosato, 1884; Bullaria adansoni (Philippi, 1847); Retusa mariateresae Parenzan, 1970

= Bulla striata =

Species of gastropod

Bulla striata, commonly known as the common Atlantic bubble or striate bubble, is a species of sea snail, a marine gastropod mollusc in the family Bullidae, the bubble snails.

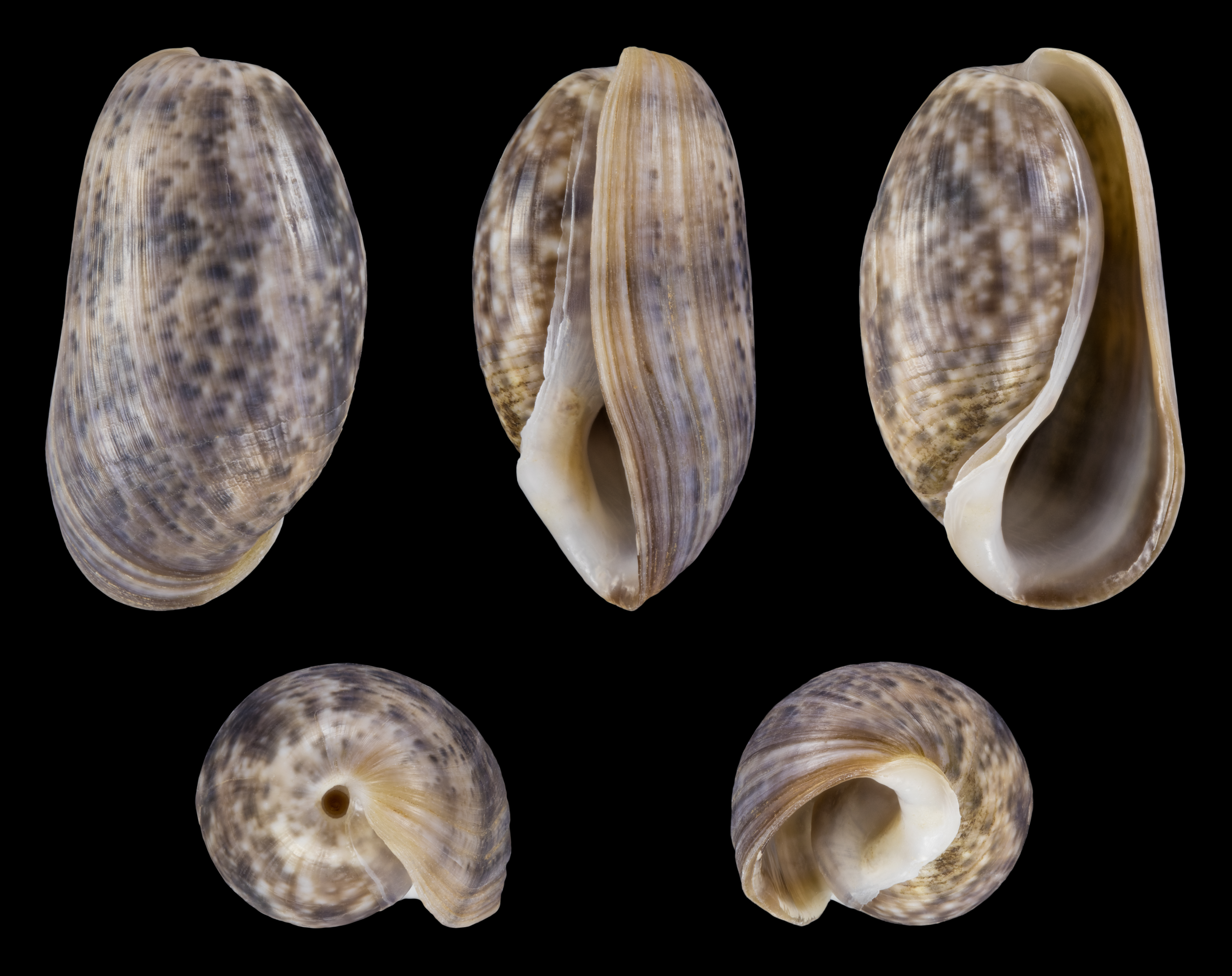
var. adansoni

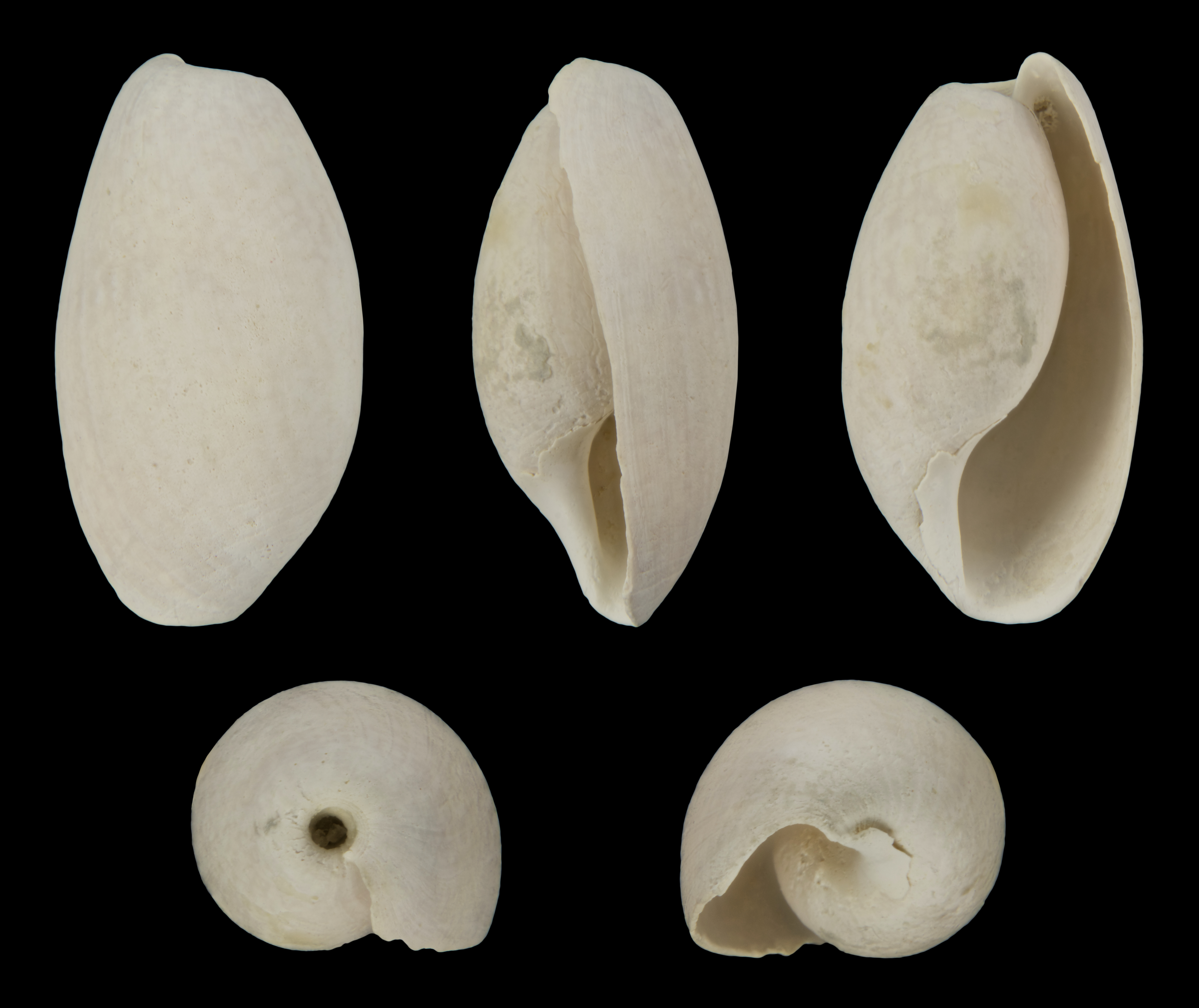
Fossil (Pliocene)
