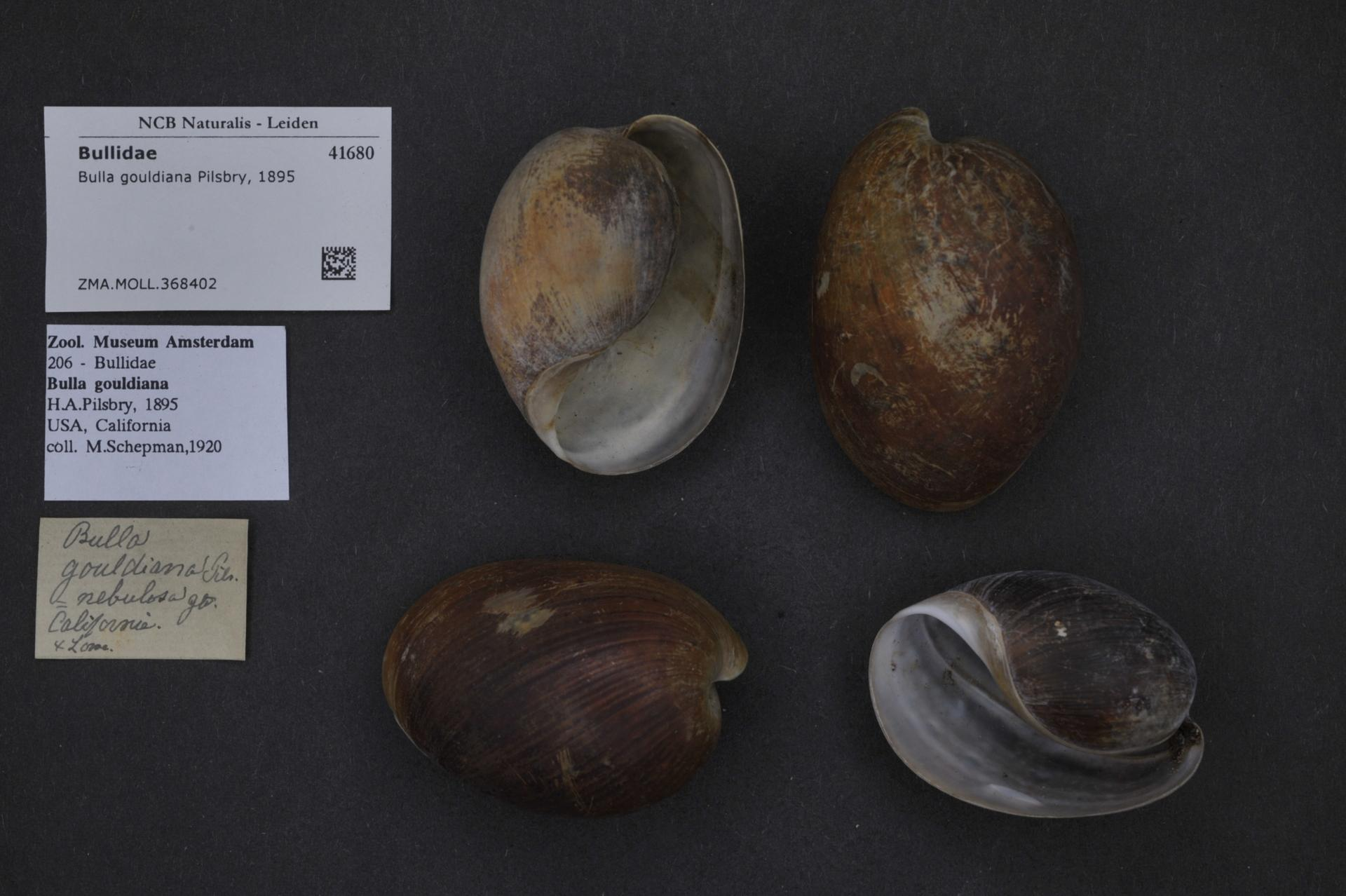

Scientific classification
- Kingdom: Animalia
- Phylum: Mollusca
- Class: Gastropoda
- Order: Cephalaspidea
- Family: Bullidae
- Genus: Bulla
- Species: B. gouldiana

Binomial name
- Bulla gouldiana Pilsbry, 1895

Synonyms
- Bulla nebulosa Gould, 1850

= Bulla gouldiana =

Species of gastropod

Bulla gouldiana, the California bubble, Gould's bubble or cloudy bubble snail, is a species of sea snail, a marine gastropod mollusc in the family Bullidae, the bubble snails. It is found in shallow water on sheltered coasts of the eastern Pacific Ocean.

== Description ==
Bulla gouldiana has a semi-transparent, paper-thin, globose shell that is brown or pale violet. The head, mantle and foot are yellowish-brown with mottled whitish dots. The aperture is wide anteriorly and narrow posteriorly. The egg mass is a yellow to orange tangled string of jelly, containing oval capsules. Each one contains up to 25 eggs, which develop into veliger larvae.

== Distribution ==
Bulla gouldiana is found in shallow water in estuaries and sheltered bays down to depths of 10 m (33 ft) on the western coast of America from California to Ecuador.
