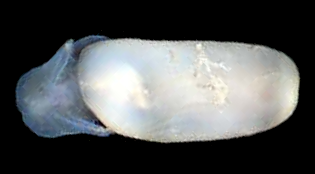
- Live Retusa sp.
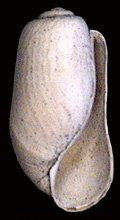
- A shell of Retusa obtusa

Scientific classification
- Kingdom: Animalia
- Phylum: Mollusca
- Class: Gastropoda
- Subterclass: Tectipleura
- Order: Cephalaspidea
- Superfamily: Bulloidea
- Family: Retusidae; Thiele, 1925

Type species
- Bulla obtusa Montagu, 1803

= Retusidae =

Family of gastropods

Retusidae is a family of very small sea snails, barrel-bubble snails, marine opisthobranch gastropod mollusks. These are headshield slugs, in the superfamily Bulloidea.

== Genera ==
Genera within the family Retusidae include:

- Pyrunculus Pilsbry, 1895
- Relichna Rudman, 1971
- Retusa T. Brown, 1827
- Sulcoretusa J.Q. Burch, 1945

Genera brought into synonymy

- Coleophysis: synonym of Retusa T. Brown, 1827
- Cylichnina Monterosato, 1884: synonym of Retusa T. Brown, 1827
- Mamilloretusa F. Nordsieck, 1972 accepted as Retusa T. Brown, 1827
- Sao H. Adams & A. Adams, 1854 accepted as Pyrunculus Pilsbry, 1895
- Sulcularia Dall, 1921 accepted as Sulcoretusa J.Q. Burch, 1945
- Utriculus T. Brown, 1844 accepted as Retusa T. Brown, 1827
