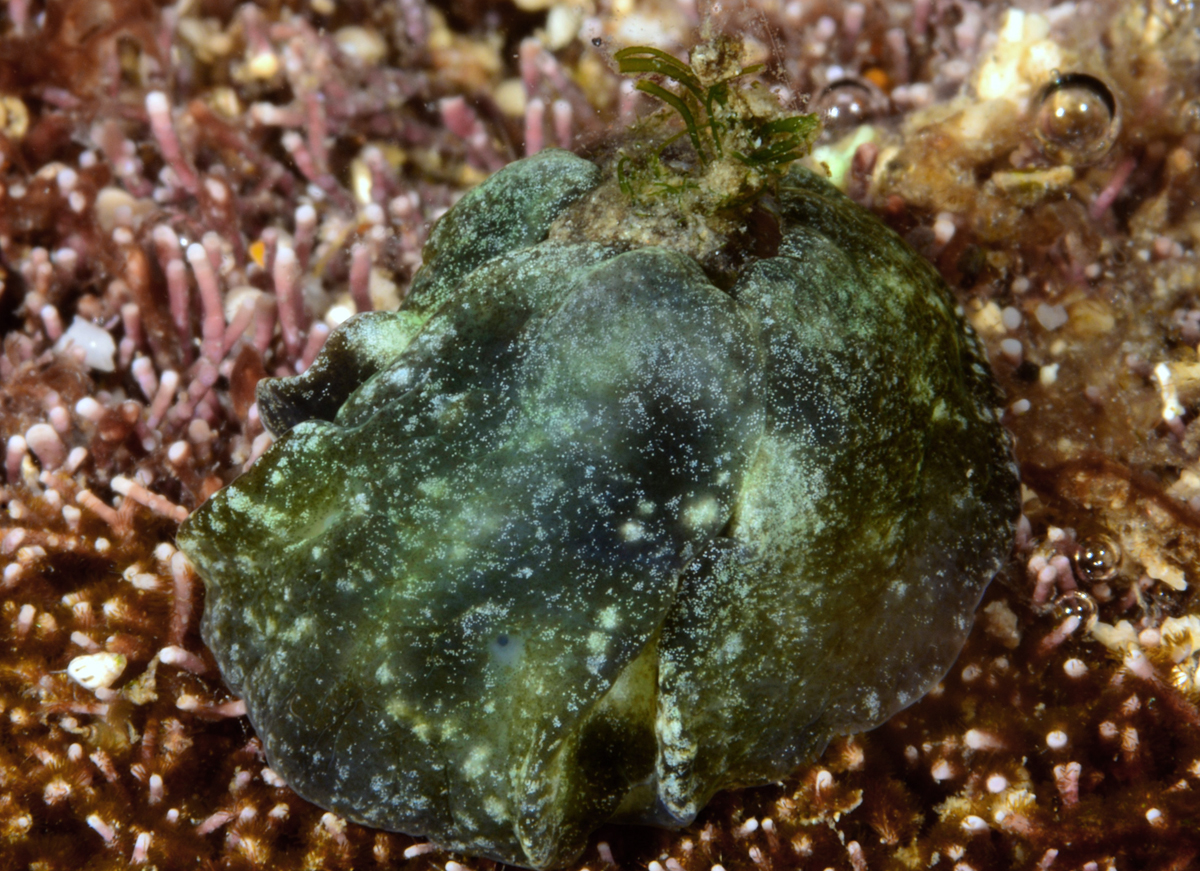

Scientific classification
- Kingdom: Animalia
- Phylum: Mollusca
- Class: Gastropoda
- Order: Cephalaspidea
- Family: Haminoeidae
- Genus: Smaragdinella
- Species: S. calyculata

Binomial name
- Smaragdinella calyculata (Broderip & G. B. Sowerby I, 1829)

Synonyms
- Bulla (Linteria) minor A. Adams, 1850; Bulla calyculata Broderip & G. B. Sowerby I, 1829 (original combination); Bulla glauca A. Adams, 1850; Bulla glauca Quoy & Gaimard, 1833; Bulla minor A. Adams, 1850; Bulla smaragdina A. Adams, 1847; Bulla viridis Quoy & Gaimard, 1833; Glauconella adamsi Gray, 1850; Linteria acuminata G. B. Sowerby II, 1870; Smaragdinella canaliculata (Broderip & G. B. Sowerby I, 1829) misspelling; Smaragdinella viridis (Rang, 1832)

= Smaragdinella calyculata =

Species of slug

Smaragdinella calyculata, also called calyx bubble shell, is a small shelled slug common on rocky shores in the Indo-Pacific including Hawaii.

== Description and Biology ==
The Smaragdinella calyculata are marine bubble-shelled slugs. The shell of the slug is flat and solid, allowing it to attach onto rocks along the shore. The shell is brownish green with shades of white. The large headshield is wide in the front, narrowing slightly to form a rounded end. The upper whorl is absent, except for a spoon-shaped projection from the columella. On each side of the shell, a foot extends into a large lateral lobe, the parapodia, which fold over, partially enclosing the shell, which lies exposed on the back of the animal. The chemosensory Hancock's organs are brown and form a thin wrinkled ridge in the areas between the foot and the headshield on each side of the head. The penial opening is on the right anterior corner of the head. A ciliated seminal groove runs back to the genital opening at the anterior end of the mantle cavity opening. They are grazers, which are consumers that feed on organisms on the bottom levels of the food chain. They are herbivorous.

== Distribution ==
Smaragdinella calyculata is found in the Hawaiian Islands and the Indo-Pacific regions. The Indo-Pacific region is a geopolitical area that spans two regions of the Indian Ocean and the Pacific Ocean. Stretching from the west coast of the United States to the west coast of India, the Indo-Pacific is a 24-nation regional framework comprising the tropical waters of the Indian Ocean, the western and central Pacific Ocean, and the seas connecting the two in the general area of Indonesia. Some examples of locations in the Indo-Pacific regions are China and Japan.

== Habitat ==
A majority of calyculata live in marine benthic zones. Marine benthic zones are regions of the ocean that encompasses the seafloor and includes regions as shores, littoral or intertidal areas, marine coral reefs, and the deep seabed. It lives at the same place on the shore as many limpets, and its compact shape and large muscular foot make it difficult to pry the animal off the rock at low tide. Most calyculata were discovered in low water near shores, attached onto various rocks and coral reefs.
