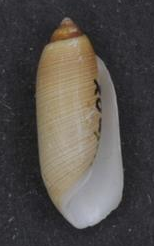
- Acteocina sp.

Scientific classification
- Kingdom: Animalia
- Phylum: Mollusca
- Class: Gastropoda
- Order: Cephalaspidea
- Superfamily: Bulloidea; Gray, 1827

Families
- See text.

= Bulloidea =

Superfamily of gastropods

Bulloidea is a superfamily of sea snails, or bubble snails, marine gastropod mollusks.

== Families ==
- Acteocinidae Dall, 1913
- Bullidae Gray, 1827
- Retusidae Thiele, 1925(s.s.)
- Rhizoridae Dell, 1952

Families brought into synonymy

- Bullariidae Dall, 1908: synonym of Bullidae Gray, 1827
- Vesicidae J. Q. Burch, 1945: synonym of Bullidae Gray, 1827
- Volvulellidae Chaban, 2000: synonym of Rhizoridae Dell, 1952
- Volvulidae Locard, 1886: synonym of Rhizoridae Dell, 1952
