= List of Christmas-themed literature =

Christmas as depicted in literature

The following is a navigational list of notable literary works which are set at Christmas time, or contain Christmas amongst the central themes.

== Novels and novellas ==
- Agatha Christie, Hercule Poirot's Christmas
- Charles Dickens, A Christmas Carol
- Charles Dickens, The Chimes
- Charles Dickens, The Cricket on the Hearth
- Charles Dickens, The Battle of Life
- Charles Dickens, The Haunted Man and The Ghost's Bargain
- Janet Evanovich, Visions of Sugar Plums
- Frederick Forsyth, The Shepherd
- Jostein Gaarder, The Christmas Mystery
- John Grisham, Skipping Christmas
- Maureen Johnson, John Green and Lauren Myracle, Let It Snow
- C. S. Lewis, The Lion, the Witch and the Wardrobe
- Stephen V. Masse, Christmas Ransom formerly A Jolly Good Fellow
- Christopher Moore, The Stupidest Angel: A Heartwarming Tale of Christmas Terror
- Kate Douglas Wiggin, The Birds' Christmas Carol

== Short stories ==
- Hans Christian Andersen, "The Fir-Tree"
- Truman Capote, "A Christmas Memory" (published in Mademoiselle)
- John Cheever, "Christmas is a Sad Season for the Poor"
- Agatha Christie, The Adventure of the Christmas Pudding
- Agatha Christie, A Christmas Tragedy
- Fyodor Dostoevsky, "A Christmas Tree and a Wedding"
- Fyodor Dostoevsky, "The Beggar Boy at Christ's Christmas Tree" (Mal'chik u Khrista na yolke) (from A Writer's Diary)
- Arthur Conan Doyle, "The Adventure of the Blue Carbuncle"
- Nikolai Gogol, "Christmas Eve" (from Evenings on a Farm Near Dikanka)
- O. Henry, The Gift of the Magi
- E. T. A. Hoffmann, "The Nutcracker and the Mouse King" (Nussknacker und Mausekönig)
- Leo Tolstoy, "Papa Panov's Special Christmas" (translation of Saillens)
- Dylan Thomas, A Child's Christmas in Wales
- Philip Van Doren Stern, The Greatest Gift
- Kurt Vonnegut, While Mortals Sleep (book of short stories)

== Children's ==
=== A ===
- Tony Abbott, Kringle
- Janet and Allan Ahlberg, The Jolly Christmas Postman
- Chris Van Allsburg, The Polar Express
- Maya Angelou, Amazing Peace
- Ronda Armitage, The Lighthouse Keeper's Christmas
- Avi, The Christmas Rat

=== B ===
- L. Frank Baum, The Life and Adventures of Santa Claus
- Ludwig Bemelmans, Madeline's Christmas
- Val Biro, Gumdrop's Merry Christmas
- Michael Bond, Paddington's Magical Christmas
- William Boniface, Christmastime Is Cookie Time
- William Boniface, The Stars Came Out on Christmas
- Paulette Bourgeois and Brenda Clark, Franklin's Christmas Gift
- Jan Brett, The Animals' Santa
- Jan Brett, Christmas Trolls
- Jan Brett, Who's That Knocking on Christmas Eve?
- Jan Brett, The Wild Christmas Reindeer
- Norman Bridwell, Clifford's Christmas
- Norman Bridwell, Clifford's First Christmas
- Raymond Briggs, Father Christmas
- Jeff Brown, Stanley's Christmas Adventure
- Marc Brown, Arthur's Christmas

=== C ===
- Pam Conrad, The Tub People's Christmas
- Jane Louise Curry, The Christmas Knight
- Margery Cuyler, The Christmas Snowman

=== D ===
- Marguerite De Angeli, Turkey for Christmas
- Marguerite De Angeli, The Lion in the Box
- Terry Deary, Horrible Christmas
- Julia Donaldson and Axel Scheffler, Stick Man
- Berlie Doherty, Old Father Christmas
- Lynley Dodd, Slinky Malinki's Christmas Crackers

=== E ===
- Howard Engel, A Child's Christmas in Scarborough
- Eleanor Estes, The Coat-Hanger Christmas Tree
- Richard Paul Evans, The Christmas Box
- Richard Paul Evans, The Christmas Candle
- Richard Paul Evans, The Light of Christmas

=== F ===
- Vivian French, The Story of Christmas
- Cornelia Funke, When Santa Fell to Earth

=== G ===
- Jack Gantos and Nicole Rubel, Rotten Ralph's Rotten Christmas
- Jack Gantos and Nicole Rubel, The Christmas Spirit Strikes Rotten Ralph
- Don Gillmor and Marie-Louise Gay, The Christmas Orange

=== H ===
- Matt Haig, A Boy Called Christmas
- Charles Hamilton (writing as Frank Richards), Billy Bunter's Christmas Party
- Charles Hamilton (writing as Frank Richards), Bunter Comes for Christmas
- Earl Hamner Jr., Lassie: A Christmas Story
- Roger Hargreaves, Mr. Christmas
- Alastair Heim, How the Grinch Lost Christmas!
- James Herriot, The Christmas Day Kitten
- Russell Hoban, Emmet Otter's Jug-Band Christmas
- William Horwood, The Willows at Christmas
- James Howe and Leslie H. Morrill, The Fright Before Christmas
- Thacher Hurd, Hobo Dog's Christmas Tree
- Thacher Hurd, Santa Mouse and the Ratdeer

=== I ===
- Mick Inkpen, Kipper's Christmas Eve

=== J ===
- William Joyce (written with Laura Geringer), Nicholas St. North and the Battle of the Nightmare King
- William Joyce, Santa Calls

=== K ===
- Eric P. Kelly, The Christmas Nightingale
- Judith Kerr, Mog's Christmas
- Suzy Kline, Horrible Harry and the Christmas Surprise

=== L ===
- Lois Gladys Leppard, Mandie and Joe's Christmas Surprise
- Lois Gladys Leppard, Merry Christmas from Mandie
- Astrid Lindgren, Brenda Brave Helps Grandmother (Kajsa Kavat hjälper mormor)
- Astrid Lindgren, A Calf for Christmas (När Bäckhultarn for till stan)
- Astrid Lindgren, Christmas in the Stable (Jul i stallet)
- Astrid Lindgren, The Runaway Sleigh Ride (Titta Madicken, det snöar!)
- Astrid Lindgren, The Tomten (Tomte är vaken)
- Astrid Lindgren, The Tomten and the Fox (Räven och Tomten)

=== M ===
- Margaret Mahy, The Christmas Tree Tangle
- Paul L. Maier, The Very First Christmas
- Ann M. Martin, Karen's Christmas Carol
- John Masefield, The Box of Delights
- Stephen V. Masse, The Taste of Snow
- Robert L. May, Rudolph the Red-Nosed Reindeer
- Phyllis McGinley, The Year Without a Santa Claus
- Phyllis McGinley, How Mrs. Santa Claus Saved Christmas
- Kate McMullan, Fluffy Saves Christmas
- Claudia Mills, Gus and Grandpa and the Christmas Cookies

=== O ===
- Oliver Optic, The Christmas Gift
- Mary Pope Osborne and Ned Bittinger, Rocking Horse Christmas

=== P ===
- Peggy Parish, Amelia Bedelia and the Christmas List
- Peggy Parish, Merry Christmas, Amelia Bedelia
- Katherine Paterson – Marvin’s Best Christmas Present Ever
- Gary Paulsen, Dunc's Undercover Christmas
- Dav Pilkey, Dragon's Merry Christmas
- Daniel Pinkwater, Wolf Christmas
- James Preller, The Case of the Christmas Snowman

=== R ===
- Gianni Rodari, The Befana's Toyshop (La freccia azzurra)

=== S ===
- Dr. Seuss, How the Grinch Stole Christmas!
- Francesca Simon, Horrid Henry's Christmas
- Francesca Simon, Horrid Henry's Christmas Ambush
- Francesca Simon, Horrid Henry's Christmas Lunch
- Francesca Simon, Horrid Henry's Christmas Play
- Francesca Simon, Horrid Henry's Christmas Presents
- Angela Sommer-Bodenburg, The Little Vampire and the Christmas Surprise
- James Stevenson, The Night After Christmas
- R. L. Stine, Fright Christmas

=== T ===
- Charles Tazewell, The Small One
- Nola Thacker (writing as Tom B. Stone), The Fright Before Christmas
- Kay Thompson and Hilary Knight, Eloise at Christmastime

=== U ===
- Alison Uttley, Christmas at the Rose and Crown
- Alison Uttley, Little Grey Rabbit's Christmas

=== W ===
- Martin Waddell, Little Dracula's Christmas
- Martin Waddell, Mimi's Christmas
- Martin Waddell, Room for a Little One: A Christmas Tale
- David Walser and Jan Pieńkowski, Meg's Christmas
- Ian Whybrow, The Christmas Bear
- Ted Willis, Baron Willis, A Problem for Mother Christmas
- Elizabeth Winthrop, Bear's Christmas Surprise
- Elizabeth Winthrop, The Christmas Pageant
- Elizabeth Winthrop, The First Christmas Stocking
- Elizabeth Winthrop, The Little Humpbacked Horse: A Russian Tale
- Elizabeth Winthrop, The Story of the Nativity
- Susan Wojciechowski and P. J. Lynch, The Christmas Miracle of Jonathan Toomey
- Elvira Woodruff, The Christmas Doll

=== Y ===
- Carol Beach York – The Christmas Dolls

== Poetry ==
- "Old Santeclaus with Much Delight"
- Clement Clarke Moore, "A Visit from St. Nicholas" (also known as "'Twas the Night Before Christmas")
- George Robert Sims, Christmas Day in the Workhouse
- T. S. Eliot, "Journey of the Magi"
- Viktor Rydberg, Tomten

== Collections ==
- Bettye Collier-Thomas, A Treasury of African American Christmas Stories
- David Sedaris, Holidays on Ice
- J. R. R. Tolkien, Letters from Father Christmas
- Jeanette Winterson, Christmas Days

== Nonfiction ==
- Francis Pharcellus Church, "Yes, Virginia, there is a Santa Claus" (1897 newspaper editorial)
