= Holus =

Holus is a 3D-image simulation product under development by H+Technology. The concept was first developed in 2013, before funding via Kickstarter meant the product could be taken to market. The purpose of Holus is to simulate holographic experiences and is technically different from typical hologram stickers found on credit cards and currency notes.

Holus has been criticized by some commentators as a revamping Pepper's ghost, a 19th-century optical trick.

== History ==
Holus was developed in late 2013 by a team in Vancouver, British Columbia, Canada.

Shortly before H+ Tech began looking for funding for the device, Holus won a number of awards for its design. This included he Vancouver User Experience Award in the non-profit category for partnering up with Ronald McDonald House to build Magic Room and the Peoples Choice Award to achieve excellence in joy, elegance, and creativity.

Its first major coverage came from a review by the Massachusetts Institute of Technology in early 2015. At the time, the technology was demonstrated to bring animals to life within the 3D glass box. The product was referred to in the review as roughly the "size of a microwave". The concept went on to win two awards at the NextBC awards in Canada in early 2015.

In order to build mass versions of the product, a Kickstarter campaign was launched in order to take the idea to market. It used a similar technology to the optical illusion known as Pepper's ghost. This drew criticism from some during its Kickstarter campaign. It launched its Kickstarter campaign in June 2015 and generated twice its target of $40,000 within the first 48 hours.

The technology is similar to the technology used to display the music artists Tupac Shakur and Michael Jackson. Since then the technology has advanced, with a number of startups entering the market. One of these was H+ Technology, who first began working on the technology in early 2013. The aim of the product at the time has remained the same until today, to produce 3D technology that can be used in the home on a tabletop.

== Research and development ==
Due to the technology being in its infancy, the media has covered the R&D of the product and its potential. Spatial light modulators have been mentioned as one potential development on future versions of Holus. The University of British Columbia and Simon Fraser University have both assisted with the research work of such displays.
