= Christmas in fiction =

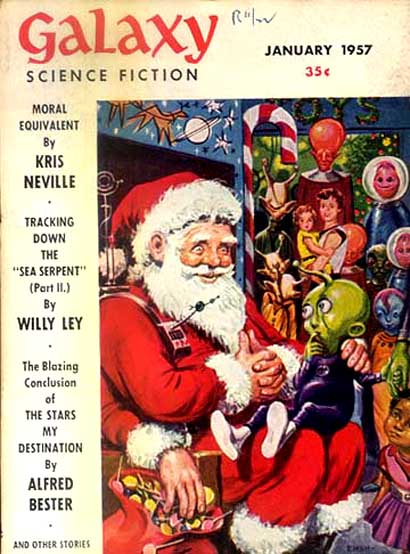
Cover of Galaxy, December 1957, featuring Santa Claus - and aliens.

The topic of Christmas has appeared in various works of fiction. Originally a religious theme related to Christianity, with the growing worldwide popularity of this holiday, many modern stories about Christmas have next to no religious content, instead focusing on more generic promotion of goodwill. Redemption is a major theme of most Christmas stories, and common tropes include characters like Santa Claus, Rudolph the Red-Nosed Reindeer, and Frosty the Snowman, as well as concepts such as Star of Bethlehem, and talking animals.

== See also ==
- List of Christmas-themed literature
