= Tomten (poem) =

1881 poem by Viktor Rydberg

- by Viktor Rydberg
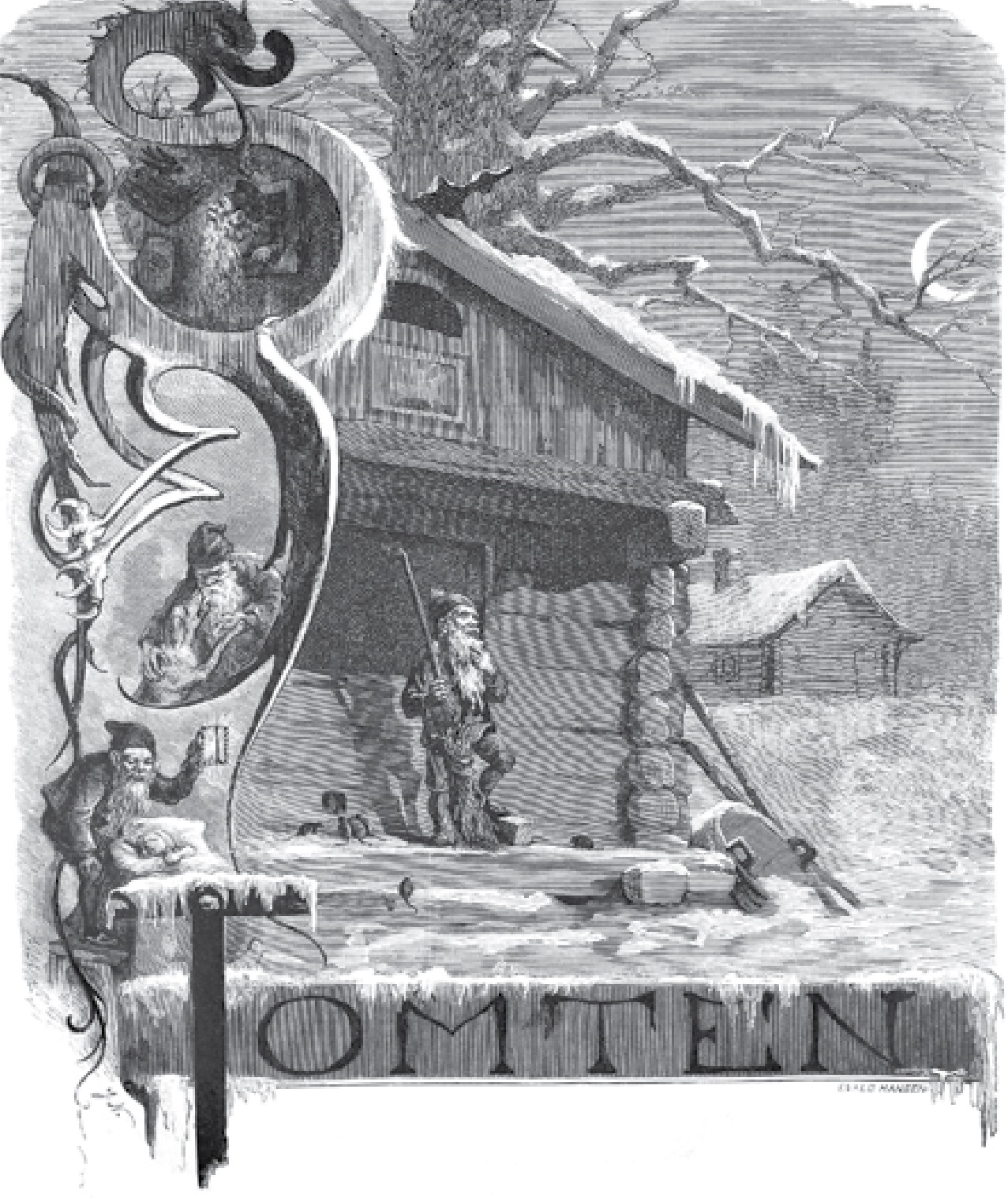
- Title illustration by Jenny Nyström 1881
- Country: Sweden
- Language: Swedish
- Publication date: 1881

"Tomten" ("The Tomte"), also known as "Midvinternattens köld är hård" ("The Cold of Midwinter Night is Harsh"), is a poem written by Viktor Rydberg, and originally published in Ny Illustrerad Tidning in 1881. While outwardly being an idyllic Christmas poem, the poem asks about the meaning of life.

A short film, Tomten, was recorded in 1941 by Gösta Roosling, where Hilda Borgström reads the entire poem.

Lotta Engberg's 2009 Christmas album Jul hos mig closes with a final, hidden, bonus track with Sven Wollter reading the poem.

The poem has also been recorded as an audio book, with Torgny Lindgren reading it.

== In English ==
Rydberg's poem has been translated into English by Charles Wharton Stork, Anna Krook, Elias Gordon Judith Moffett. In 1960 Astrid Lindgren published a prose version of the story with illustrations by Harald Wiberg. Both films based on her Tomten stories were made: Tomte Tummetott and the Fox in 2007, and The Tomten and the Fox in 2019.

== American Translation ==
An American translation of Tomten was published as a children's book in 2017 by Spencer Harden, illustrated by Georgia Stylou. An audio version of the children's book was recorded in 2018, narrated by American Hercules actor Kevin Sorbo, who is of Scandinavian heritage.

== Set to music ==
- Julens önskesångbok, 1997, under the lines "Traditionella julsånger", with music by Lyyli Wartiovaara-Kallioniemi.

== See also ==
- List of Christmas-themed literature
