= Henry Dircks =

English engineer

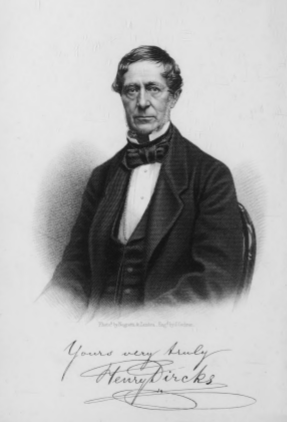
- Portrait of Henry Dircks from his book Nature-Study
- Born: 26 August 1806; Liverpool, England
- Died: 17 September 1873 (aged 67); Brighton, England
- Engineering career
- Projects: Perpetual motion
- Significant design: Pepper's ghost

Henry Dircks FRSE FCS (26 August 1806– 17 September 1873) was an English engineer who is considered to have been the main designer of the projection technique known as Pepper's ghost in 1858. It is named after John Henry Pepper who implemented a working version of the device in 1862. Dircks also investigated attempts at the invention of a perpetual motion device, writing that those who sought to create such a thing were "half-learned" or "totally ignorant".

== Life and career ==
Dircks was born in Liverpool on 26 August 1806.

He was apprenticed to a mercantile firm and spent much of his free time studying practical mechanics, chemistry, and literature. Around the mid-1820s he began lecturing about chemistry and electricity while writing literary articles in the local press and scientific papers in the Mechanics' Magazine and other journals. In 1837 he became a life member of the British Association, and afterwards contributed papers to its proceedings. Two years later he wrote a pamphlet regarding a proposed union of mechanics' and literary institutions. He also wrote a short treatise entitled Popular Education, a series of Papers on the Nature, Objects, and Advantages of Mechanics' Institutions, first printed in Liverpool in 1840. In 1843, Dircks and Thomas Hoblyn wrote an overview of the smokeless argand furnace, which was created by Charles Wye Williams in an attempt to solve the issue of smoky air in London.

He became a practical engineer, conducting railway, canal, and mining works, before progressing to the role of consulting engineer. He continued to investigate technologies and invent new devices, taking out several patents between 1840 and 1857. Dircks joined the Royal Society of Literature, the Royal Society of Edinburgh, and other scientific bodies. In 1867 he was elected a full Fellow of the Royal Society of Edinburgh, his proposer being William John Macquorn Rankine.

The dedications of Dircks' works help give a glimpse into some of his personal and professional acquaintances. Contribution Towards a History of Electro-Metallurgy (1863) includes a dedication to Michael Faraday. The dedication is full of high praise for Faraday's contributions to the origin of Electrometallurgy. Faraday became a prominent 19th century scientific figure, and both Dircks and Faraday were members of their Royal Societies. Dircks dedicated The Life, Times, and Scientific Labours of the Second Marquis of Worcester. To Which Is Added, a Reprint of His Century of Inventions, 1663, With a Commentary Thereon (1865) to Henry Somerset, 8th Duke of Beaufort. Inventors and Inventions(1867) begins with a dedication to Henry Bessemer. A Biographical Memoir of Samuel Hartlib, Milton’s Familiar Friend, With Bibliographical Notices of Works Published By Him, and a Reprint of His Pamphlet Entitled, "An Invention of Engines of Motion." (1867) is dedicated to Bennet Woodcroft, in which Dircks references their 25 year friendship and expresses his gratitude for founding the Patent Office Museum.

In 1868 he was given an honorary degree (LL.D.) from Tusculum College in Tennessee.

Dircks died in Brighton on 17 September 1873.

== Literary works ==
Most of Dircks' literary work involved conducting critical reviews of emerging technologies as well as biographies of scientific figures. One major exception is Joseph Anstey, a fictional novel written by Dircks under the pseudonym D.S. Henry.

- 1840. Account of a Patent Improved Metallic Roadway Wheel With Wood-faced Tyre. Dircks read this before the Liverpool Polytechnic and the mechanical section of the British Association.
- 1840. Popular Education, a series of Papers on the Nature, Objects, and Advantages of Mechanics' Institutions.
- 1852. Jordantype, Otherwise Called Electrotype. A review of electrometallurgy and an attempt to absolve C.J. Jordan from rumors that he was not the inventor of this technology.
- 1861. Perpetuum Mobile. This book includes opinions from Dircks and other scientists on the likelihood of achieving perpetual motion. He also lists encyclopedic definitions of perpetual motion, as well as new scientific journals and recent patents.
- 1863. Joseph Anstey: or, The Patron and The Protégé. A Story of Chequered Experiences in Life.
- 1863. The Ghost! as Produced in the Spectre Drama.
- 1863. Contribution Towards a History of Electro-Metallurgy.
- 1865. The Life, Times, and Scientific Labours of the Second Marquis of Worcester. To Which Is Added, a Reprint of His Century of Inventions, 1663, With a Commentary Thereon.
- 1866. Worcesteriana: Affording Historical, Biographical, and Other Notices Relating to Edward Somerset, Sixth Earl and Second Marquis of Worcester, Inventor of the Steam Engine; and His Immediate Family Connections.
- 1867. Inventors and Inventions, In Three Parts: I. The Philosophy of Invention, II. The Rights and Wrongs of Inventors, III. Early Inventors' Inventories of Secret Inventions. This treatise was dedicated to Henry Bessemer, an inventor, engineer and long-time friend of Dircks.
- 1867. A Biographical Memoir of Samuel Hartlib, Milton’s Familiar Friend, With Bibliographical Notices of Works Published By Him, and a Reprint of His Pamphlet Entitled, "An Invention of Engines of Motion."
- 1869. Nature-Study; or, The Art of Attaining Those Excellencies in Poetry and Eloquence which are Mainly Dependent On the Manifold Influences of Universal Nature.
- 1869. Statistics of Invention. Illustrating the Policy of a Patent Law. Part II of a Letter Addressed to the Right Hon. Lord Stanley, M.P.
- 1869. Scientific Studies or Practical in Contrast With Chimerical Pursuits Exemplified in Two Popular Lectures: I. The Life of Edward Somerset, Second Marquis of Worcester. II. Chimeras of Science: Astrology, Alchemy, Squaring the Circle, Perpetuum Mobile, etc.
- 1870: A History of the Search for Self-Motive Power from the 13th to The 19th Century. Dircks' second book on perpetual motion.
- 1872. Naturalistic Poetry, Selected From Psalms and Hymns of the Last Three Centuries. In Four Essays, Developing the Progress of Nature-Study, in Connection With Sacred Song.

== Poetry ==
Dircks studied natural poetry, writing many critical essays on various hymns and religious poems in his books Nature-study, and Naturalistic Poetry in 1869 and 1872 respectively. He dedicated Nature-Study to the "poet, philosopher, and statesman," Richard Monckton.

Dircks wrote that these study's of poems are to progress the study of nature, quoting Mark Akenside, "Give me to learn each secret cause; Let numbers, figures. Nature's laws, Reveal'd before me stand: Then to great Nature's scenes apply, And, round the globe, and thro' the sky, Disclose her working hand." He later defines nature in his book Nature-Study as anything "distinguished from Art, includes the entire Creation, animate and inanimate."

In Naturalistic Poetry, Dircks writes a series of four essays studying psalms and hymns written in the seventeenth, eighteenth, and nineteenth centuries. In Nature-Study, he again discusses mostly religious poetry, exploring the poems individually, and deciphering them. He concludes his book by discussing the perfection, creativity, and beauty of nature.

== Pepper's ghost ==
Spiritualists and phantasmagoria performers plied their trade by attempting to convince audiences that they were able to contact the dead. To add weight to their claims they would use various projection techniques, particularly magic lanterns, that would seemingly make a ghost appear. Dircks was frustrated by such trickery and developed a better technique that could help dispel the simpler methods. He saw this as a triumph of enlightenment over superstition and hoped that the scientific explanations would educate people enough to keep them away from such charlatans.

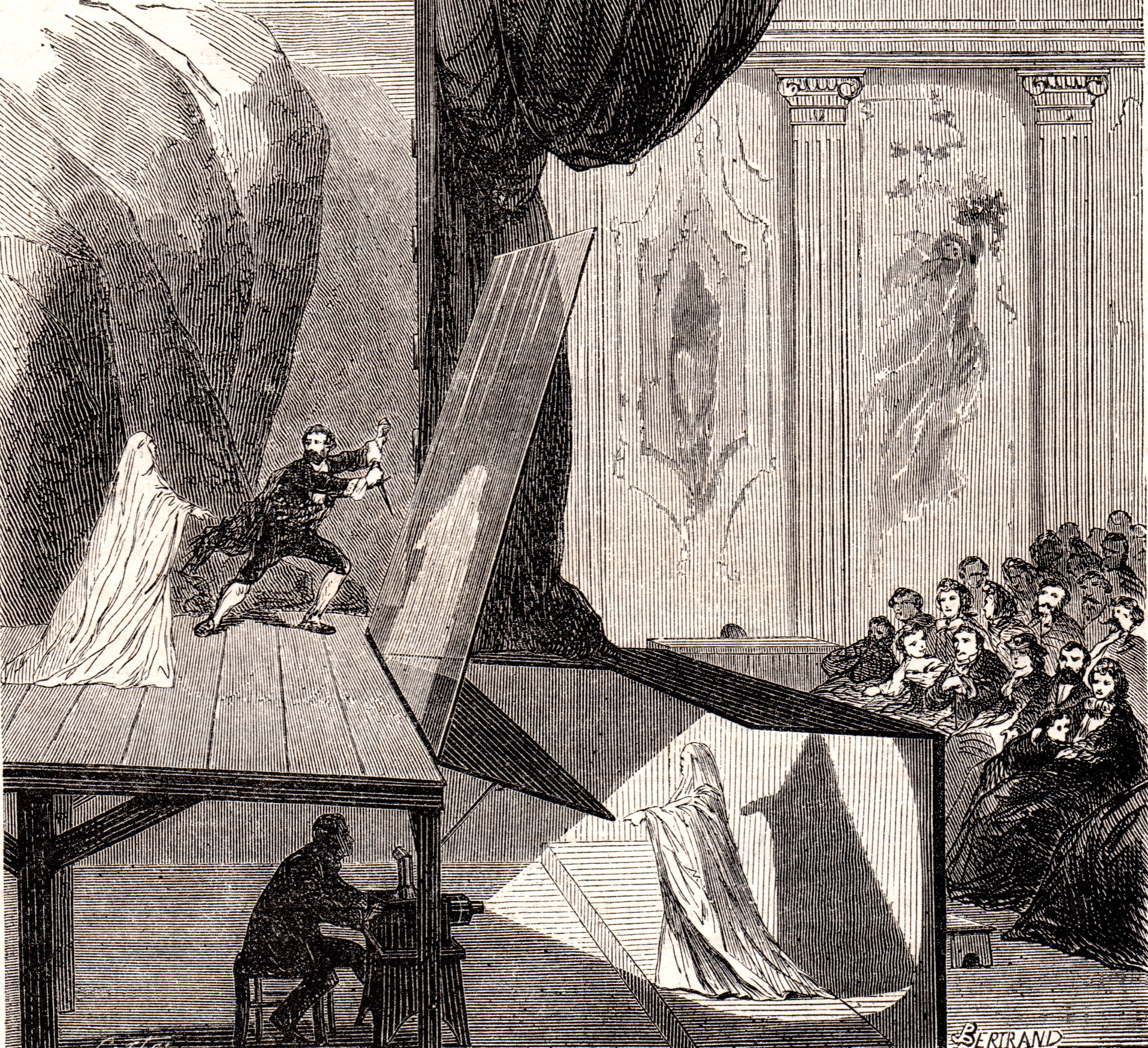
Setup of Pepper's Ghost Illusion. Appears to the audience that there is a ghost on the stage.

Dircks developed a way of projecting an actor onto a stage using a hidden room, a sheet of glass, and a clever use of lighting, calling the technique "Dircksian Phantasmagoria". The actor would then have an ethereal, ghost-like appearance while seemingly able to perform alongside other actors. Dircks is believed to have described this invention to the British Association in 1858. The unwieldy implementation of his system meant that theatres would need to be entirely rebuilt to accommodate the technique and some refinements would therefore be needed if it were to be adopted on a wide scale.

Popular science lecturer John Henry Pepper saw the concept and replicated it on a larger scale, taking out a joint patent with Dircks. Pepper debuted his creation with a Christmas Eve production based on Edward Bulwer-Lytton's novel A Strange Story in 1862. This debut was to a small audience of press members held at the Polytechnic. Written permission from Charles Dickens was later given to display his play The Haunted Man to exhibit the ghost illusion. This exhibit ran for fifteen months.

Some reports have suggested that, at the time, Pepper claimed to have developed the technique after reading the 1831 book Recreative Memoirs by famed showman Étienne-Gaspard Robert even after Dircks signed over all financial rights. Dirck's published his book The ghost as produced in the Spectra Drama describing how the idea came to him and how Pepper produced it. Either way, the effect became known as "Pepper's ghost" and this name was used by those who replicated the technique. Because of this Dircks became increasingly convinced that his invention had been stolen from him, believing that a conspiracy had been perpetrated against him at first by the Polytechnic and then latterly by the newspapers and advertisers who omitted his name.

Dircks' original plan to give rational explanations to dispel the popular appetite for spiritualism was certainly helped by Pepper. Further, Pepper's ghost has been hailed as a key development in stage magic and "the cornerstone upon which much subsequent magic was founded". In one of his later books Pepper would insist that Dircks should have a share of the credit, and though the technique is still today named after the man who popularised it Dircks is hailed as the originator of the invention.

The pair's involvement in the development of Pepper's ghost was summarised in an 1863 article from The Spectator:

This admirable ghost is the offspring of two fathers, of a learned member of the Society of Civil Engineers, Henry Dircks, Esq., and of Professor Pepper, of the Polytechnic. To Mr. Dircks belongs the honour of having invented him, or as the disciplines of Hegel would express it, evolved him from out of the depths of his own consciousness; and Professor Pepper has the merit of having improved him considerably, fitting him for the intercourse of mundane society, and even educating him for the stage.

== Perpetual motion ==
Dircks had an interest in ongoing the search for a perpetual motion machine. Interestingly enough, Dircks interest in perpetual motion was not due to his enjoyment of the subject, but more due to his disdain for it. It has also been noted that Dircks felt "contemptuous pity" for anyone that was seriously interested in studying the topic of perpetual motion. In 1861, he commented on the subject in his book that "The subject of Perpetual Motion opposes paradox to paradox." His book Perpetuum mobile; or, Search for self-motive power, published in 1861, examined many attempts at creating such a device, and has since been cited by other science writers on the subject. Dircks summarised the ongoing efforts of inventors:

A more self-willed, self-satisfied, or self-deluded class of the community, making at the same time pretension to superior knowledge, it would be impossible to imagine. They hope against hope, scorning all opposition with ridiculous vehemence, although centuries have not advanced them one step in the way of progress.

and:

There is something lamentable, degrading, and almost insane in pursuing the visionary schemes of past ages with dogged determination, in paths of learning which have been investigated by superior minds, and with which such adventurous persons are totally unacquainted. The history of Perpetual Motion is a history of the fool-hardiness of either half-learned, or totally ignorant persons.

In 1870, Dircks had a second book published under the title "Perpetuum Mobile; or; a History of the Search for Self-Motive Power from the Thirteenth, to the Nineteenth Century." This was a follow-up to his first book in which he collected and presented more information and history of perpetual motion devices. In these two works, Dircks worked to carefully classify attempts at creating perpetual motion devices by the year that they were created and in some instances by patent applications. For Henry this turned out to be a difficult task as perpetual motion devices have been attempted across many different countries and time periods. Dircks also broke down perpetual motion devices down into three different categories of how the motion would generally be produced. These three types of devices were motion by chemical extractions, motion by magnetical virtues, and motion by the natural affection of gravity.

Dircks study of perpetuum mobile built upon the earlier exploration of the subject by Simon Stevin, who wrote: “It is not true [falsum] that the globe moves by itself with an endless movement [aeternum]”.
