= Jul hos mig =

2009 Lotta Engberg Christmas album

Studio album by Lotta Engberg
- Released: 11 November 2009
- Recorded: Bell Studio; Roseship Alley Studio ("Julen för mig"); Studio Gallskrik (Lotta Engberg, Jill Johnson, Christer Sjögren); Studio Elevator Nobody (strings) 2009
- Genre: Christmas
- Length: 49:59
- Label: Lionheart

Lotta Engberg chronology
| Upp till dans (2009) | Jul hos mig (2009) | Lotta & Christer (2012) |

Jul hos mig includes five duets, and was released on 11 November 2009 and is Lotta Engberg's first Christmas album. The album peaked at second place at the Swedish album chart, and sold gold.

The song "Äntligen december" was tested for Svensktoppen, and entered the chart on 13 December 2009. The upcoming week, the song had been knocked out of chart.

== Track listing ==
| # | Title | Songwriter | Length |
|---|---|---|---|
| 1. | "Vår vackra vita vintervärld (Winter Wonderland)" | Felix Bernard, Dick Smith, Lars Green | 2.21 |
| 2. | "En julsaga (Fairytale of New York), duet with Sven Wollter | Shane MacGowan, Jem Finer, Marie Nilsson, Per Persson | 4.33 |
| 3. | "Himlen kom ner" ("Himmel på jord") | Amund Enger, Jan Vincent Johanessen, Dan Attlerud | 3.33 |
| 4. | "Baby, It's Cold Outside", duet with Alexander Rybak | Frank Loesser | 3.07 |
| 5. | "Snön" | Bobby Ljunggren, Sonja Aldén | 3.52 |
| 6. | "Julen för mig", duet with Nordman | Mats Wester, Dan Attlerud | 3.13 |
| 7. | "Äntligen december" | Lars Forsberg, Sven-Inge Sjöberg, Lennart Wastesson | 3.28 |
| 8. | "Silver Bells", duet with Jill Johnson | Jay Livigston, Raymond Evans | 3.14 |
| 9. | "Who Would Imagine a King" | Merwyn Warren, Hallerin Hill | 3.01 |
| 10. | "Julen är här" (Rockin' Around the Christmas Tree) | John Marks, Keith Almgren | 2.10 |
| 11. | "Blue Christmas", duet with Christer Sjögren | Bill Hayes, Jay Johnson | 3.52 |
| 12. | "Vid julen är vi alla barn" | Kristian Lagerström, Anders Dannvik | 3.04 |
| 13. | "The Christmas Song" | Robert Wells, Mel Tormé | 4.17 |
| 14. ("hidden" bonus track) | "Tomten", Sven Wollter reads | Viktor Rydberg | 5.12 |

== Contributing musicians ==
- Jörgen Ingeström - Keyboards, guitars and programming (all songs, except "Julen för mig)
- Bo Reimer - programmering (all songs, except "Julen för mig)
- Johan Franzon - drums (all songs, except "Julen för mig)
- Ove Andersson - bass (all songs, except "Julen för mig)
- Britt Bergström - choir (track 1, 3, 5, 7, 10, 11, 12)
- Johan Alenius - saxophone tenor (track 1, 7, 12), saxophone (track 10, 13)
- Anders Sjögren - alto saxophone och baritone saxophone (track 1, 7, 12)
- Mikael Andefjärd - trombone (track 1, 7, 12)
- Hans Dyvik - trombone (track 1, 7, 12)
- Hans Wester - nyckelharpa and keyboards (track 6)
- Roger Tallroth - guitar (track 6)
- Micke Marin - viola (track 6)
- Göran Månsson - flute (track 6)
- Mattias Johansson - violin (track 4)
- David Bukovinszky - cello (track 4)
- Lovisa Hübinette, Clara Hübinette, Anna Wester, Anna Rohlin Larsson, and Klara Motakesi - choir (track 6)

== Charts ==
=== Weekly charts ===
| Chart (2009) | Peak position |
|---|---|
| Swedish Albums (Sverigetopplistan) | 2 |

=== Year-end charts ===
| Chart (2009) | Position |
|---|---|
| Swedish Albums (Sverigetopplistan) | 43 |
