= The Runaway Sleigh Ride =

1983 children's book by Astrid Lindgren

- Author: Astrid Lindgren
- Original title: Titta Madicken, det snöar!
- Illustrator: Ilon Wikland
- Cover artist: Ilon Wikland
- Language: Swedish
- Series: Madicken
- Genre: Children
- Set in: Sweden
- Published: 1983
- Publisher: Rabén & Sjögren
- Publication place: Sweden
- English publication date: 1984

The Runaway Sleigh Ride! (Swedish: Titta Madicken, det snöar!) is a 1983 Astrid Lindgren children's book. Set at Christmastime, the book was published in English in 1984.

== Plot ==
It is snowing at Junibacken. Madicken and Lisabet go out playing in the snow. The upcoming day, Madicken gets sick and Lisabet and Alva go out Christmas shopping. Suddenly, Lisabet disappears into the forest by sleigh.

== See also ==
- List of Christmas-themed literature
