= Jim Harris (illustrator) =

Jim Harris (born 1955) is an illustrator and author of children’s books, with more than three million copies in print. His books are best known for their detailed and humorous depictions of animal and human characters.

== Bibliography ==
=== Author ===
- Jack and the Giant
- The Three Little Dinosaurs (and the Big Bad Tyrannosaurus Rex)
- Dinosaur's Night Before Christmas

=== Illustrator ===
- A Tree in Sprocket’s Pocket
- A Very Hairy Christmas
- Goose and the Mountain Lion
- Gruesome Stew
- Jacques and de Beanstalk
- Librarian’s Night Before Christmas
- Mystery in Bugtown (author: William Boniface)
- Petite Rouge
- Rapunzel
- Slim and Miss Prim (author: Robert Kinerk)
- Ten Little Dinosaurs (author: Pattie Schnetzler)
- Ten Little Kittens
- Ten Little Puppies
- The Bible ABC
- The Lizard Who Followed Me Home
- The Three Little Javelinas
- The Three Little Pigs
- The Tortoise and the Jackrabbit
- The Treasure Hunter
- The Trouble With Cauliflower
- The Legend of the Whistle Pig Wrangler
- The Three Little Cajun Pigs
- Towns Down Underground
- Tuesday in Arizona
- When You're A Pirate Dog and Other Pirate Poems
- Wiggler’s Worms

== Awards and best seller lists ==
- Publishers Weekly Top 10 Bestseller List 1997, for Ten Little Dinosaurs
- Colorado Book Awards 1997, for Ten Little Dinosaurs
- Colorado Children’s Book Award 1998, for Ten Little Dinosaurs
- Colorado Children's Book Award Nominee 2001, for Slim and Miss Prim
- Children’s Choice Award 1998, for Ten Little Dinosaurs
- Arizona Young Readers Award 1994, for The Three Little Javelinas
- PBS Reading Rainbow 1994, for The Three Little Javelinas
- Colorado Book Award 1994, for Goose and the Mountain Lion
- Arizona Young Reader’s Award Finalist, for Goose and the Mountain Lion
- Colorado Book Award Finalist, for Rapunzel
- Washington Children's Choice Picture Book Award Finalist 1996, for The Three Little Javelinas
- Western Writers of America Spur Award 1999, for Slim and Miss Prim
- Western Writers of America Storyteller Award Finalist 1998, for Jack and the Giant
- New York Society of Illustrators Awards of Merit 1986, 1987, 1990, 1991
- New York Society of Illustrators Silver Medal 1991
- Communication Arts Award of Excellence 1987
- Storytelling World Honor Book 2002, for Petite Rouge
- Book Sense 76 Top 10 Pick 2001, for Petite Rouge
- National Society for Social Studies/Children’s Book Council Notable Children’s Book 2002, for Petite Rouge
- Louisiana Young Reader’s Choice Award 2004, for Petite Rouge
- Mockingbird Books 2006, for The Trouble with Cauliflower
- OneBookAZ 2010, for The Three Little Javelinas/Los Tres Pequenos Jabalies
