= When Santa Fell to Earth =

2004 novel by Cornelia Funke

When Santa Fell to Earth (German: Als der Weihnachtsmann von Himmel fiel) is a 2004 novel by German author Cornelia Funke. It was translated into English and published by the Chicken House in 2006. The novel was adapted as a film by Oliver Dieckmann, which premiered in UK theaters in December 2012.

== Plot summary ==
Gerold Geronimus Goblynch, the ruthless new leader of the Great Christmas Council, is determined to turn the holiday season into his personal moneymaking scheme. He wants to end children's joyous wishes by outlawing all of the old magical ways. Under his leadership, Snowmobiles are to replace reindeer; elves and angels are banned; and Santas who go against these policies are turned into chocolate.

Niklas Goodfellow, a spirited, humorous young Santa, emerges as the last, and thus real Santa. He and two angels named Matilda and Emmanuel, an invisible reindeer, and a bunch of elves go into hiding from the Council. Two children named Ben and Charlotte and Charlotte's dog, Mutt, join forces to save Niklas from being turned into chocolate.

== See also ==
- List of Christmas-themed literature
