= A Christmas Tree and a Wedding =

1848 short story by Fyodor Dostoevsky

- Short story by Fyodor Dostoyevsky
- Original title: Ёлка и свадьба (Yolka i svad'ba)

Publication
- Publication date: 1848

"A Christmas Tree and a Wedding" (Russian: Ёлка и свадьба, Yolka i svad'ba) is a short story written by Russian author Fyodor Dostoyevsky published in 1848. The piece is narrated by a guest at a New Year's Eve ball. He observes the party's guest of honour who takes special interest in one of the children.

== Plot summary ==
The story begins five years before present, at a New Year's Eve party which had been thrown by a wealthy businessman as a children's ball, with the ulterior purpose of allowing the adults to discuss business. The guest of honour at the party was Julian Mastakovich, who the other guests looked upon with reverence.

The narrator was another guest at the party, a self-described "outsider" without business to discuss with the others. This detachment allowed him to observe the other guests, including the children who were seen around a Christmas tree. Each of the children received gifts in accordance with the social standing of their parents: the 11-year old daughter of an "immensely wealthy business man" received a fine doll, while the son of a widowed governess received a shabby book of little interest to the child. Afterward, the governess' son attempted to play with the other boys, but was bullied, eventually being told by his mother to stop interfering with the play of the other children. The governess' son retreated into another room and was occupied playing with the rich girl and her doll.

A topic of discussion at the party was that the father of the rich girl had already set aside a dowry of 300,000 rubles for her. The narrator, unobserved, watched Julian Mastakovich calculate the expected growth of the girl's dowry before she would reach age of 16, determining the dowry would then be as large as 500,000 rubles. Mastakovich then approached the girl and kissed her on the head, causing her to recoil. As he continued to harass the girl, she looked to the governess' son for help, but Mastakovich drove him off. Mastakovich himself left the room after hearing someone approach. Mastakovich then turned his attention to the governess' son and cruelly chased him under a table. Shortly after, Mastakovich and the parents of the young girl are seen speaking intimately, to the delight of the other guests.

The final scene is set in present time. As the narrator walks past a church, he sees a wedding celebration. While not recognizing the groom at first, he quickly realizes it is Mastakovich. The girl, now 16, is seen to be the bride. The narrator notes her beauty, her innocence, and her discontent with the marriage. The narrator then hears the crowd discussing that the girl's dowry had been 500,000 rubles, as Mastakovich had previously calculated. The narrator concludes that the marriage had been a good business deal for Mastakovich after all.

== Film adaptation ==
A Christmas Tree and a Wedding was adapted into a film of the same name, directed by Will Wallace and released in 2000.

== See also ==
- List of Christmas-themed literature
