= The Cricket on the Hearth =

1845 novella by Charles Dickens

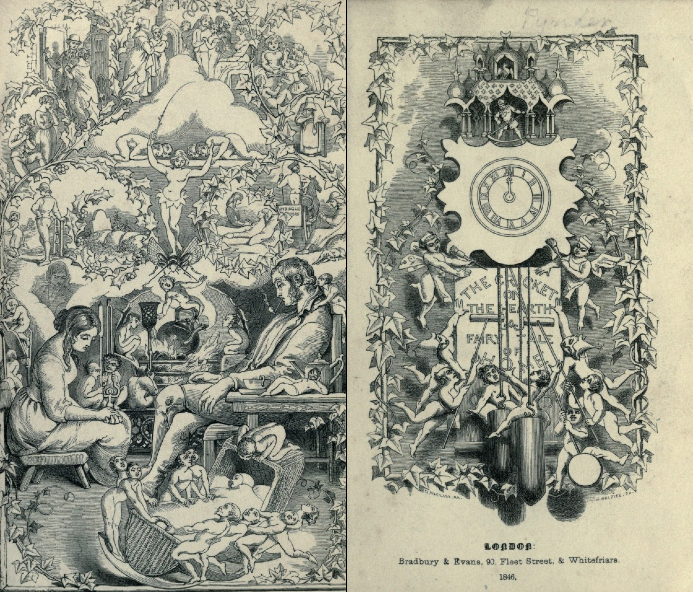
- Frontispiece of second edition, 1846
- Author: Charles Dickens
- Illustrator: Daniel Maclise; John Leech; Richard Doyle; Clarkson Stanfield; Edwin Landseer
- Language: English
- Genre: Novella
- Publisher: Bradbury and Evans
- Publication date: 20 December 1845
- Publication place: England
- Media type: Print
- Preceded by: The Chimes
- Followed by: The Battle of Life
- Text: The Cricket on the Hearth at Wikisource

The Cricket on the Hearth: A Fairy Tale of Home is a novella by Charles Dickens, published by Bradbury and Evans, and released 20 December 1845 with illustrations by Daniel Maclise, John Leech, Richard Doyle, Clarkson Stanfield and Edwin Henry Landseer. Dickens began writing the book around 17 October 1845 and finished it by 1 December. Like all of Dickens's Christmas books, it was published in book form, not as a serial.

Dickens described the novel as "quiet and domestic [...] innocent and pretty." It is subdivided into chapters called "Chirps", similar to the "Quarters" of The Chimes or the "Staves" of A Christmas Carol. It is the third of Dickens's five Christmas books, preceded by A Christmas Carol (1843) and The Chimes (1844), and followed by The Battle of Life (1846) and The Haunted Man and the Ghost's Bargain (1848).

== Plot ==
John Peerybingle, a slow but honest carrier, lives contentedly with his beloved wife Dot and their infant son. A teenage nursemaid, Tilly Slowboy, provides intermittent help with the child. Dot is still an attractive young woman, much younger than her husband, but she loves him dearly and is perfectly content with her life and her home. A cricket chirps cheerfully on the hearth, reflecting the family's happiness.

One night, John gives a lift in his cart to a mysterious elderly stranger who invites himself to lodge with the family for a few days. John is surprised at the alacrity with which Dot agrees.

The Peerybingles are friends with Caleb Plummer, a poor toymaker who lives with his blind daughter Bertha. Caleb is employed by the stern and ill-natured toy merchant Tackleton who announces that he intends to marry one of Dot's old schoolfriends, May Fielding. Some years earlier, May had been the sweetheart of Caleb's son, Edward, before his presumed death in South America, but now with few prospects May has little option but to concede to her mother's insistence that she should marry the wealthy Tackleton.

Tackleton draws John's attention to an assignation between Dot and the lodger, and they watch unobserved through a window as the lodger, now seen to be a young man in disguise, clasps Dot around the waist. John is devastated at his wife's betrayal, and that night as he sits before the fire he contemplates murdering the young man. Suddenly, the cricket on the hearth begins to chirp, and in fairy shape shows John visions of his wife's history from her school days onwards, always emphasising her goodness and loyalty. After a sleepless night, John's desire for revenge fades, and he convinces himself that Dot could never have been truly happy with him, and that he must for her own sake release her from her marriage vows.

But before John can say anything, the mysterious lodger is revealed to be Caleb's son, Edward, who has unexpectedly returned. Having heard that May was to marry Tackleton, he disguised himself as an old man in order to discover whether his former sweetheart had forgotten him. Dot recognised him straight away, and fell in with the deception for fear that her honest but clumsy husband might accidentally tip-off Tackleton, allowing him to wed May quickly before anybody had a chance to prevent him. Now, all is revealed and Edward marries May himself. Dot has never been unfaithful to John, and she reminds him that she loves him with all her heart.

Initially peeved at having missed the opportunity to marry May, Tackleton relents and sends gifts to the happy couple. That evening he joins the wedding dance, and the cricket on the hearth joins in with its own chirps.

== Principal characters ==
- John Peerybingle, a carrier; a lumbering, slow, honest man
- Mary ("Dot") Peerybingle, John's wife
- Tilly Slowboy, family nursemaid
- Dot and John's infant son
- Tackleton (called "Gruff and Tackleton"); a stern, ill-natured, toy merchant
- Caleb Plummer, a poor toymaker in the employ of Tackleton
- Bertha Plummer, Caleb's blind daughter
- Edward Plummer, Caleb's son
- May Fielding, an old friend of Dot's
- Mrs Fielding, May's mother; a peevish, querulous old lady

== Background ==
In July 1845, Dickens contemplated forming a periodical focusing on the concerns of the home. It was to be called The Cricket, but the plan fell through, and he transformed his idea into a Christmas book in which he abandoned social criticism, current events, and topical themes in favour of simple fantasy and a domestic setting for his hero's redemption, though some have criticised this notion. The book was released on 20 December 1845 (the title page read "1846") and sold briskly into the New Year. Seventeen stage productions opened during the Christmas season 1845 with one production receiving Dickens's approval and opening on the same day as the book's release. Dickens read the tale four times in public performance. It has been dramatised in numerous languages and for years was more popular on stage than A Christmas Carol. Cricket is less explicitly Christian than some of Dickens's other Christmas books, and it has been criticised for its sentimentality, but contemporary readers were attracted to its depiction of the Victorian ideal of the happy home.

== Literary significance and criticism ==
The book was a huge commercial success, quickly going through two editions. Reviews were favourable, but not all so. In an unsigned piece in The Times the reviewer opined, "We owe it to literature to protest against this last production of Mr. Dickens [...] Shades of Fielding and Scott! Is it for such jargon as this that we have given your throne to one who cannot estimate his eminence?" However, William Makepeace Thackeray enjoyed the book immensely: "To us, it appears it is a good Christmas book, illuminated with extra gas, crammed with extra bonbons, French plums and sweetness [...] This story is no more a real story than Peerybingle is a real name!"

Dickens's portrayal of the blind girl Bertha is significant. Victorians believed disabilities were inherited, and thus it was not socially acceptable for the blind to marry (although they often did in reality). In fictional courtship plots, the blind were often used to build tension since it was assumed they must be kept from marrying. The fictional portrayal of Bertha is similar to Dickens's description in American Notes (1842) of the deaf and blind girl Laura Bridgman, whom he saw on a visit to the Perkins Institution for the Blind in Boston, Massachusetts.

Modern scholars have given the story little attention, but Andrew Sangers has argued it contains similarities to Shakespeare's comedies and should be seen "both as a significant indication of the tastes of the 1840s and of Dickens himself."

Vladimir Lenin left during a performance of the Cricket play in Russia, as he found it dull and the saccharine sentimentality got on his nerves. This incident might be little remembered if George Orwell had not mentioned it in his essay on Dickens.

== Adaptations ==
Stage adaptations include the successful The Cricket on the Hearth by Albert Richard Smith produced at the Surrey Theatre in 1845, and Dion Boucicault's Dot, A Drama in Three Acts (or simply Dot), first performed at New York's Winter Garden in 1859. It was staged repeatedly in Britain and America for the remainder of the 19th century, starring, at times, John Toole, Henry Irving, and Jean Davenport. The play helped launch the career of American actor Joseph Jefferson (1829–1905).

The novella was the basis for at least two operas: Karl Goldmark's Das Heimchem am Herd with a libretto by A. M. Willner (premiere: June 1896, Berlin; New York 1910), and Riccardo Zandonai's Il grillo del focolare with a libretto by Cesare Hanau (premiere: November 1908, Turin). Goldmark's opera was performed in Philadelphia in November 1912 with the Cricket sung by American soprano Mabel Riegelman (1889, Cincinnati – 1967, Burlingame, California).

Film, radio, and television adaptations include three American silent film versions: one, directed by D.W. Griffith (1909) starring Owen Moore, another directed by L. Marston (1914) starring Alan Hale, and one directed by Lorimer Johnston (1923). A silent Russian version, Sverchok na Pechi (1915) was directed by Boris Sushkevich and Aleksandr Uralsky and starred Maria Ouspenskaya. A silent French version, Le Grillon du Foyer (1922), was directed and adapted by Jean Manoussi and starred Charles Boyer as Edouard. A 25-minute NBC radio play adaptation aired on 24 December 1945.

In 1967, Rankin/Bass Productions produced a 50-minute animated television adaptation of the story for NBC. Told in the Cricket's own words, it featured the voices of Roddy MacDowall as the Cricket, and father and daughter Danny Thomas and Marlo Thomas as Caleb and Bertha, with various other characters voiced by Paul Frees and Hans Conried. Television Corporation of Japan (now Eiken) provided the animation for the special, while its seven original songs were written and composed by Maury Laws and Jules Bass.

== See also ==
- List of Christmas-themed literature
