= John Henry Pepper =

British scientist and inventor (1821–1900)

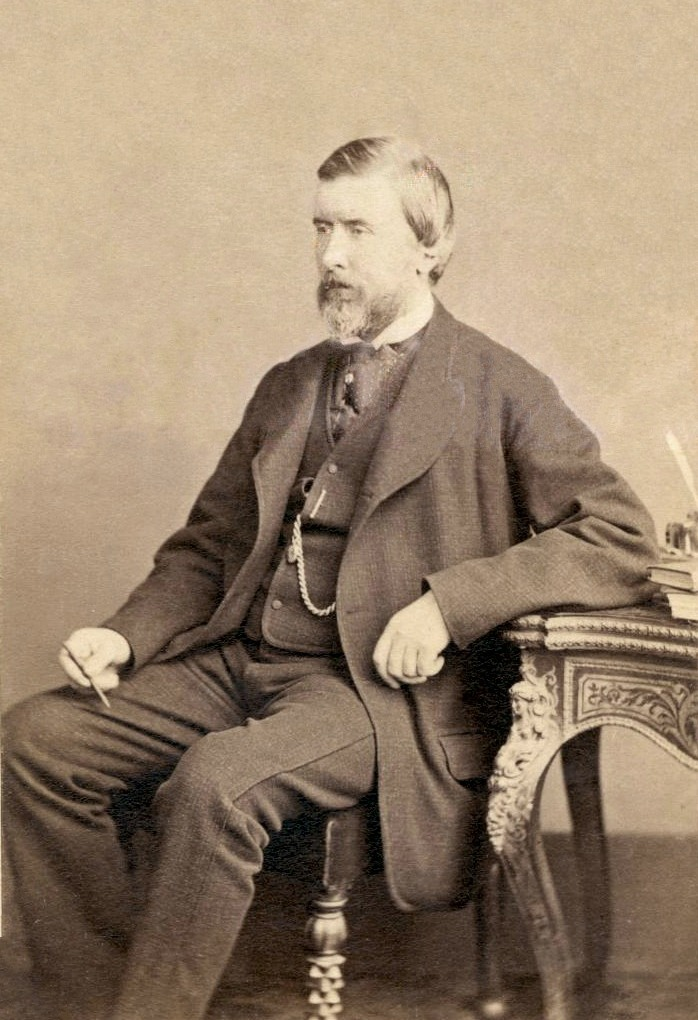
- Born: 17 June 1821; Westminster, London, England
- Died: 25 March 1900 (aged 78); Leytonstone, England
- Known for: Pepper's ghost and other scientific demonstrations Educational science books
- Scientific career
- Fields: Chemistry
- Institutions: Royal Polytechnic Institution

John Henry "Professor" Pepper (17 June 1821 – 25 March 1900) was a British scientist and inventor who toured the English-speaking world with his scientific demonstrations. He entertained the public, royalty, and fellow scientists with a wide range of technological innovations. He is primarily remembered for developing the projection technique known as Pepper's ghost, building a large-scale version of the concept by Henry Dircks, which Pepper first publicly demonstrated during an 1862 Christmas Eve theatrical production of the Charles Dickens novella, The Haunted Man and the Ghost's Bargain, causing a sensation among those in attendance at the Regent Street theatre in London.

Pepper also oversaw the introduction of evening lectures at the Royal Polytechnic Institution (University of Westminster) and wrote several important science education books, one of which is regarded as a significant step towards the understanding of continental drift. While in Australia he tried unsuccessfully to make it rain using electrical conduction and large explosions.

== Early life ==
Pepper was born in Westminster, London and educated at King's College School. While there he became interested in chemistry, as taught by John Thomas Cooper. Cooper acted as a mentor to Pepper, who went on to become an assistant lecturer at the Grainger School of Medicine at the age of 19. In around 1843 he was elected a Fellow of the Chemical Society.

== Career in England ==
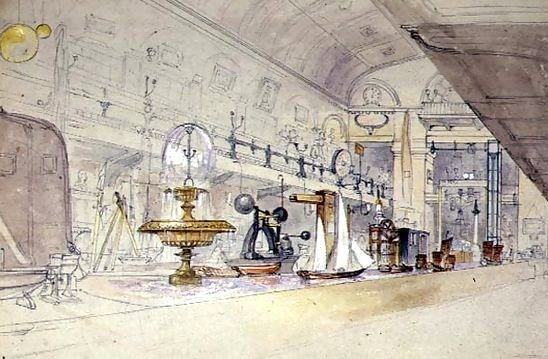
A drawing by G.F. Sargeant, published in 1847, showing the interior of the Royal Polytechnic Institution

Pepper delivered his first lecture at the Royal Polytechnic Institution in 1847 and went on to take the role of analytical chemist and lecturer the year after. By the early 1850s he was its director. He introduced a series of evening classes covering educational and trade topics, and lectured by invitation at some of the most prestigious schools across England, including Eton, Harrow, and Haileybury. Amongst the students at Eton was Quintin Hogg, who would go on to become a philanthropist and benefactor of the Royal Polytechnic Institution. Pepper also lectured in New York and Australia. Pepper became a highly regarded science performer and often went by the name "Professor Pepper". He regularly demonstrated a range of scientific and technological innovations with the intention of entertaining and educating the audience about how they worked. He used many of these to expose the trickery behind deceptive magic, and became famous for a new technique now known as "Pepper's ghost".

=== Pepper's ghost ===
Liverpudlian engineer Henry Dircks is believed to have devised a method of projecting an actor onto a stage using a sheet of glass and a clever use of lighting, calling the technique "Dircksian Phantasmagoria". The actor would then have an ethereal, ghost-like appearance while seemingly able to perform alongside other actors. Pepper saw the concept and replicated it on a larger scale, taking out a joint patent with Dircks. Pepper debuted his creation with a Christmas Eve production of the Charles Dickens play The Haunted Man in 1862 and Dircks signed over all financial rights to Pepper. Through this the effect became known as "Pepper's ghost", much to the frustration of Dircks, and though Pepper insisted that Dircks should have a share of the credit, the technique is still named after the man who popularised it. Some reports have suggested that, at the time, Pepper claimed to have developed the technique after reading the 1831 book Recreative Memoirs by famed showman Étienne-Gaspard Robert.

Pepper's demonstrations of "the ghost effect" were received with amazement by the general public while intriguing his fellow scientists. People returned to the theatre repeatedly in an attempt to work out the method being used; famed physicist Michael Faraday eventually gave up and requested an explanation.

=== Authoring ===
Pepper wrote eleven popular science books, starting with his first publications in the 1850s. 1861's The Playbook of Metals, built upon the work of Antonio Snider-Pellegrini and is regarded as an important step in the understanding of continental drift. The books became so successful, particularly The Boy's Playbook of Science, that they could be found in secondary schools throughout the United Kingdom, and some American reprints became prescribed school texts in Pennsylvania and Brooklyn.

=== Electricity and light ===
Pepper was fascinated with electricity and light. In 1863 he illuminated Trafalgar Square and St. Paul's Cathedral to celebrate the marriage of Albert Edward, Prince of Wales, and Alexandra of Denmark. He achieved this using a variation of the arc lamp. On 21 December 1867 at a banquet of "noblemen and scientific gentlemen" Pepper arranged for a telegram to be sent between Arthur Wellesley, 2nd Duke of Wellington and Andrew Johnson, President of the United States who was in Washington at the time. The message took just under 10 minutes to arrive in the United States with a reply coming in after around 20 minutes. This transmission was hailed as a significant achievement for science.

== Life in Australia ==
With wife Mary Ann (born circa 1831), Pepper had a son (born circa 1856). Between 1874 and 1879 the family toured the United States and Canada before being invited to Australia. They arrived in Melbourne on 8 July 1879 and Pepper gave his first lecture just four days later. Interest in his demonstrations began to wane after a month, so he took his show to Sydney.

Pepper heard tales of Fred Fisher, a farmer in nearby Campbelltown who had mysteriously disappeared in 1826. A supposed sighting of Fisher's ghost sparked a legend that is still recounted today. Pepper incorporated the ghost into his shows, amazing his audiences for a while but, once again, the public desire for his shows tailed off after a month. For a time he tried his hand as playwright, producer, and actor, putting on a romantic drama called Hermes and the Alchymist. The show was poorly received and lasted only a few weeks.

Over the next two years he took his show around Australia, visiting New South Wales, Victoria, and South Australia. After the tour he settled in Ashgrove, Brisbane, Queensland, and worked as a public analyst. There he built a house, now the heritage-listed Woodlands. While there Pepper continued to deliver lectures and is believed to have been the first person to formally teach chemistry in the state.

=== Rainmaking attempts ===
ANNOUNCEMENT EXTRAORDINARY.
THE GREAT SCIENTIFIC EXPERIMENT OF TAPPING THE CLOUDS !
OR,
RAIN-MAKING !
Will be attempted on the
BRISBANE RACECOURSE,
ON SATURDAY NEXT, 4TH FEBRUARY,
BY PROFESSOR J. H. PEPPER.
To prevent overcrowding in the vicinity of the Professor's Apparatus, a small nominal charge of SIXPENCE admission to the Course will be made.

— Advertisement in The Brisbane Courier, 30 January 1882

The summer of 1882 brought a drought to the south-east of Queensland with little rain and intense temperatures. Pepper believed that a scientific solution to the problem might be possible and decided to attempt a rainmaking experiment. He took out a front page advertisement in the 30 January 1882 issue of The Brisbane Courier to publicise the event, scheduled for 4 February 1882 at the Eagle Farm Racecourse. Further advertisements mentioned that there would be "several interesting Illustrations of Atmospheric Phenomena" and gave some details about the method that he planned to employ.

Pepper started his experiments in the weeks leading up to the public event. He gathered a range of materials including ten swivel guns, powerful rockets from HMS Cormorant, a land mine, and a large quantity of gunpowder. The plan would be to create a bonfire that would billow smoke into the air, then an explosion in the clouds would contribute to a change in their electrical condition. He theorised that this would trigger the rainfall. Several helpers tried to launch a 20-foot steel kite into the air but had little success, finding it to be unwieldy. He reduced its size in time for the main show.

The Eagle Farm event was attended by nearly 700 people. Pepper's smaller kite only managed to fly a short distance into the sky and had to be abandoned. The swivel guns were then fired, attempting to create an explosion in the sky. However, due to an overfilling of powder in one of the guns, the only explosion of significance was the gun itself which was sent crashing into the empty grandstand. Another potentially dangerous incident was the launching of the rockets, one of which flew horizontally, narrowly missing the crowd.

The crowd were not impressed by the efforts of Pepper and his team, laughing and jeering at their failed attempts. Some members of the audience even joined in by trying to launch the kite themselves. The newspapers were also unkind with the Warwick Examiner and Times describing the event as being a "pseudo-scientific fiasco". Pepper felt very badly treated by fellow scientists and the general public and in a letter written to The Brisbane Courier dated 27 May 1882 he stated:

"My experiment in Queensland was received with such derision and insults that in the face of those hard steely railings I shall leave to others the honour and expense of trying to do good by gently persuading the clouds to drop fatness."

In the coming years, other scientists attempted what Pepper called "cloud compelling" (see weather modification). In another letter to The Brisbane Courier in April 1884, Pepper referred to one of them, saying that he hoped the scientist would "not be unappreciated or treated with the ribald and narrowminded jokes and judgments that were showered on my head."

== Death ==
Pepper returned to England in 1889 to enjoy his retirement. He died in Leytonstone on 25 March 1900. There is a memorial to Pepper at West Norwood Cemetery.

== Sources ==
Seccombe, Thomas (1901). "Pepper, John Henry" . In Lee, Sidney (ed.). Dictionary of National Biography (1st supplement). London: Smith, Elder & Co.
