= Tomte Tummetott and the Fox =

2007 film by Sandra Schießl

- Directed by: Sandra Schießl
- Screenplay by: Marcus Sauermann
- Produced by: Marion Heinßen; Jan Weitendorf
- Cinematography: Mikolaj Jaroszewicz
- Music by: Jens Fischer
- Release date: 2007
- Running time: 30 minutes
- Country: Germany
- Language: German

Tomte Tummetott and the Fox (original: Tomte Tummetott und der Fuchs) is a 2007 German film directed by Sandra Schießl and based on the novels The Tomten and The Tomten and the Fox by Astrid Lindgren.

== Plot ==
It is winter and the landscape is covered in snow. All animals are hungry, especially the fox. He wants to kill and eat the chicken in the stable. Meanwhile, Emma wants to put food outside for the dwarf Tomte Tummetott. Her older brothers laugh at her, because they think Tomte Tummetott doesn't exist. Her mother however says that, just because if someone can't see it, it doesn't mean it doesn't exist.

Meanwhile, the mice see that the fox is on his way to the chicken stable. They inform Tomte Tummetott, who tells them to let the dog know about this. Then Tomte feeds the other animals. He tells them that he saw many winters come and go and that they have to be patient as this winter will also give way to spring.

With the help from the dog, the cow and the mice Tomte can stop the fox from killing and eating the chicken.

Tomte gives the food that Emma has put outside for him to the fox. Emma watches the scene. She is so happy that she finally saw Tomte, but when she calls her mother and brothers Tomte is gone. Only the fox is outside eating the food from Emma.

== Cast ==
Figure	English (voice)	German (voice)
Tomte Tummetott	Max Hafler	Achim Hall
Fox	Rod Goodall	Wolf Frass
Emma	Kim Larney	Florentine Stein
Dog	Drew Lucas	Peter Kirchberger
Chicken	Eileen Gibbons	Ruth Rockenschaub
Chicken	Helen Gregg	Karime Vakilzadeh
Chicken	Hilary Kavanagh	Christiane Carstens
Mouse	Gary Hetzler	Monty Arnold
Mouse	Hilary Kavanagh	Karime Vakilzadeh
Cow	Helen Gregg	Andrea Bongers
Sheep	Gery Hetzler	Robert Missler
older boy	Heather Keegan	Aaron Kaulbarsch
younger boy	Tiernan Surlis	Flemming Stein
Mother	Helen Gregg	Marion von Stengel
Father	John Murphy	Bruno Bachem

== Background ==
The film was produced by TRIKK17 in Hamburg, St. Pauli. The work on the 30 minutes film took over a year. In spring 2006, Jan Weitendorf, from the Friedrich Oetinger company, went to Sweden, to talk with Astrid Lindgren's grandson Nils Nyman about the project. He told him that he wanted to make the film as a stop motion animation. Nils Nyman found that interesting and agreed to the making of the film.

The original poem about Tomte was made by Viktor Rydberg. Harald Wiberg later made some pictures of Tomte. Astrid Lindgren wrote the story much later, so that people all around the world can read the story. The film was made by a total of 41,106 individual images. In Germany next to the film also an audio play of the film has been released.

=== English release ===
The film was translated into English by David Henry Wilson. It was shown on several international film festivals. The English version was also released on the German DVD, but only the film was translated and dubbed into English, not the making off which was released on the same DVD. The DVD also features the Tomte Tummetott song in English, German and Swedish.

== Reception ==
=== Awards ===
2007

- Grand Prix Award, 6. Animation Contest of Folktales and Fables - in Hida-Takayama, Japan

2008

- Grimme-Preis

=== Critical response ===
Deutsche Film- und Medienbewertung (FBW) called Tomte Tummetott and the Fox a wonderfully filmed Christmas story. They noted that characters are detailed, and that everything fits in perfectly in this animated film.

Kinofilmwelt.de said that children, as well as adults, are addressed by this family film which has an amazing Christmas atmosphere.

Flimmo believes the film is characterized by its loving and charming realisation. Children in preschool will find it easy to follow the plot in the film, which also can be enjoyed by older children and adults.

== Trivia ==
- Emma has a Pippi Longstocking doll in the film.
