= Pepper's ghost =

Illusion technique

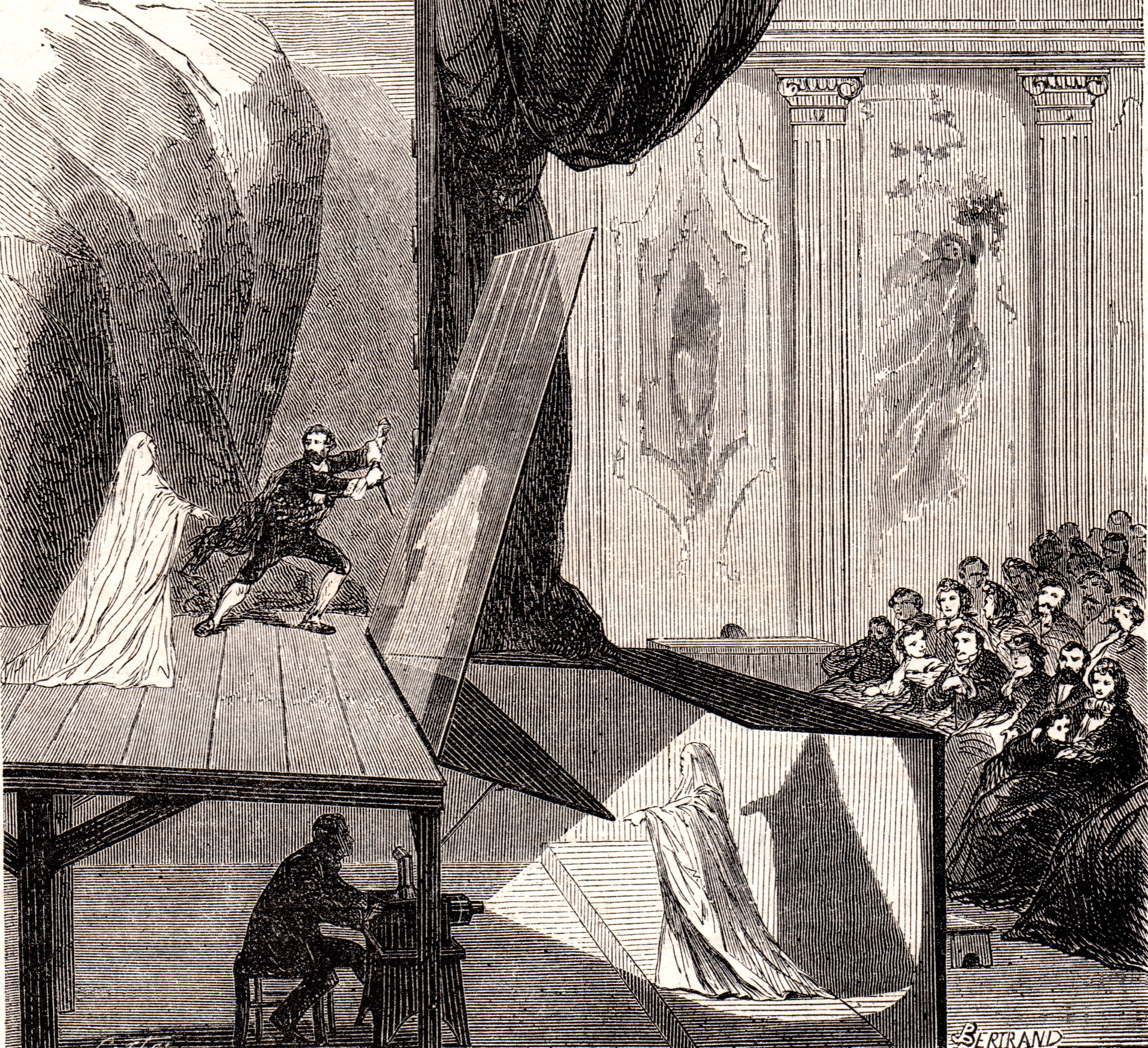
Stage setup for Pepper's ghost. A brightly lit figure out of the audience's sight below the stage is reflected in a pane of glass placed between the performer and the audience. To the audience, it appears as if the ghost is on stage.

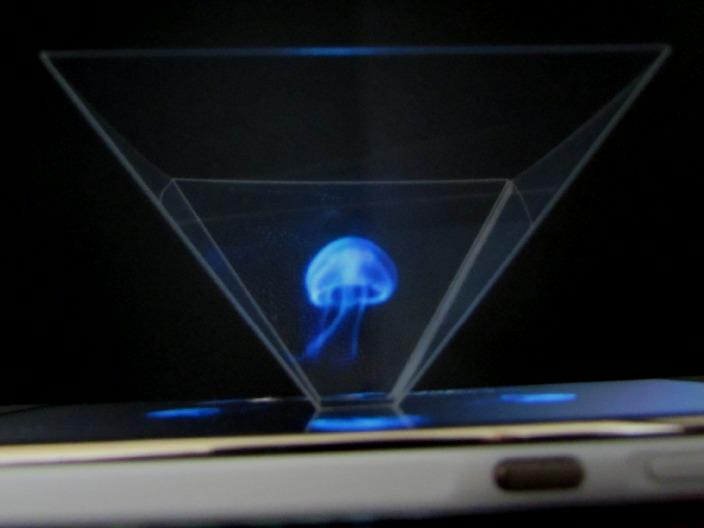
A projector made from a clear plastic frustum employing the Pepper's ghost principle

Pepper's ghost is an illusion technique, used in theatre, cinema, amusement parks, museums, television, and concerts, in which an image of an object offstage is projected so that it appears to be in front of the audience.

The technique is named after the English scientist John Henry Pepper, who popularised the effect during an 1862 Christmas Eve theatrical production of the Charles Dickens novella The Haunted Man and the Ghost's Bargain, which caused a sensation among those in attendance at the Regent Street theatre in London. An instant success, the production was moved to a larger theatre and continued to be performed throughout the whole of 1863, with the Prince of Wales (future King Edward VII) bringing his new bride (later Queen Alexandra) to see the illusion, and it launched an international vogue for ghost-themed plays that used this novel stage effect during the 1860s and subsequent decades.

The illusion is widely used for entertainment and publicity purposes. These include the Girl-to-Gorilla trick found in old carnival sideshows and the appearance of "ghosts" at the Haunted Mansion and the "Blue Fairy" in Pinocchio's Daring Journey, both at Disneyland in California. Teleprompters are a modern implementation of Pepper's ghost. The technique was used to display a life-size illusion of Kate Moss at the 2006 runway show for the Alexander McQueen collection The Widows of Culloden.

In the 2010s, the technique was used to make virtual artists appear onstage in apparent "live" concerts, with examples including Tupac Shakur and Michael Jackson. It is often wrongly described as "holographic". Such setups can involve custom projection media server software and specialized stretched films. The installation may be a site-specific one-off, or a use of a commercial system such as the Cheoptics360 or Musion Eyeliner.

Products have been designed using a clear plastic pyramid and a smartphone screen to generate the illusion of a 3D object.

== Effect ==
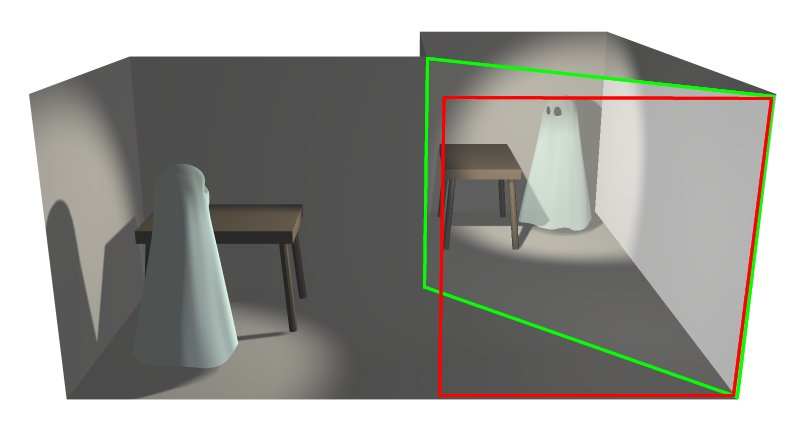
A viewer looking through the red rectangle sees a ghost floating next to the table. The illusion is produced by a large piece of glass, acrylic glass or plastic film (green outline) situated at an angle between viewer and scene. The glass reflects a room hidden from the viewer (left), sometimes called a blue room, that is built as a mirror-image of the scene.

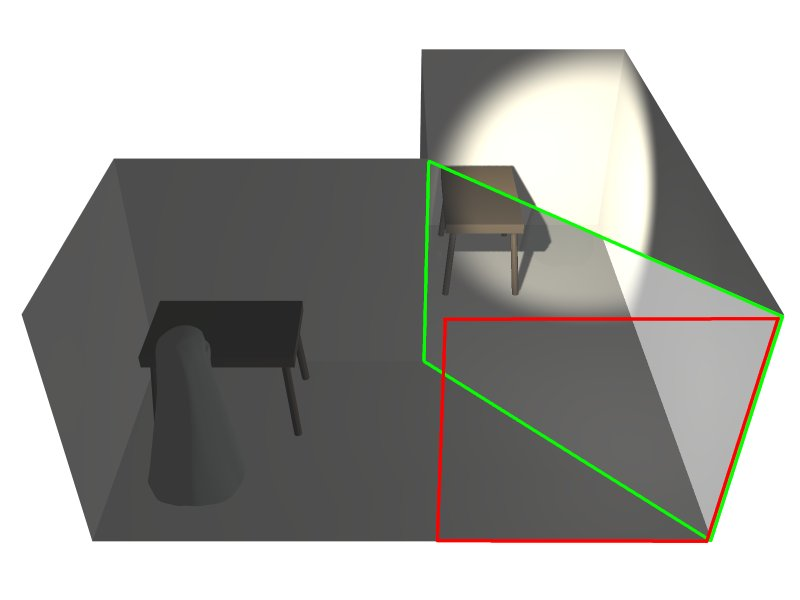
If the mirror-image room (left) is darkened, it does not reflect well in the glass. The empty room (top) is brightly lit, making it very visible to the viewer.

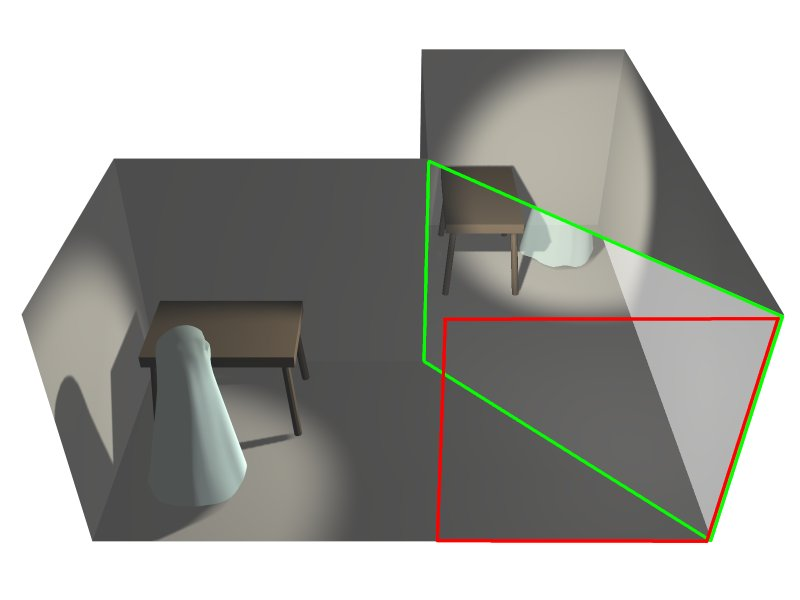
When the lights in the mirror-image room are raised (with the empty room being dimmed slightly to compensate), the ghost appears out of nowhere.

The core illusion involves a stage specially arranged into two rooms or areas, one into which audience members can see, and a second (sometimes referred to as the "blue room") that is hidden to the side. A sheet of plate glass, acrylic glass or plastic film is placed somewhere in the main room at an angle that reflects the view of the blue room towards the audience. Generally, this is arranged with the blue room to one side of the stage and the plate on the stage rotated around its vertical axis at 45 degrees. Care must be taken to make the glass as invisible as possible, normally hiding the lower edge in patterning on the floor and ensuring lights do not reflect off it. The plate catches a reflection from a brightly lit actor in an area hidden from the audience. Not noticing the glass screen, the audience mistakenly perceive this reflection as a ghostly figure located among the actors on the main stage. The lighting of the actor in the hidden area can be gradually brightened or dimmed to make the ghost image fade in and out of visibility.

When the lights are bright in the main room and dark in the blue room, the reflected image cannot be seen. When the lighting in the blue room is increased, often with the main room lights dimming to make the effect more pronounced, the reflection becomes visible and the objects within the blue/hidden room seem to appear, from thin air, in the space visible to the audience. A common variation uses two blue/hidden rooms, one behind the glass in the main room, and one to the side, the contents of which can be switched between "visible" and "invisible" states by manipulating the lighting therein.

The hidden room may be an identical mirror-image of the main room, so that its reflected image exactly matches the layout of the main room; this approach is useful in making objects seem to appear or disappear. This illusion can also be used to make an object, or person—reflected in, say, a mirror—appear to morph into another (or vice versa). This is the principle behind the Girl-to-Gorilla trick found in old carnival sideshows. Another variation: the hidden room may itself be painted black, with only light-coloured objects in it. In this case, when light is cast on the room, only the light objects strongly reflect that light, and therefore appear as ghostly, translucent images on the (invisible) pane of glass in the room visible to the audience. This can be used to make objects appear to float in space.

The type of theatre use of the illusion which John Henry Pepper pioneered and repeatedly staged in the 1860s were short plays featuring a ghostly apparition which interacts with other actors. An early favourite showed an actor attempting to use a sword against an ethereal ghost, as in the illustration. To choreograph other actors' dealings with the ghost, Pepper used concealed markings on the stage floor for where they should place their feet, since they could not see the ghost image's apparent location. Pepper's 1890 book includes such detailed explanation of his stagecraft secrets, disclosed in his 1863 joint application with co-inventor Henry Dircks to patent this ghost illusion technique.

The hidden area is typically below the visible stage but in other Pepper's ghost set-ups it can be above or, quite commonly, adjacent to the area visible to the viewers. The scale can be very much smaller, for instance small peepshows, even hand-held toys. The illustration shows Pepper's initial arrangement for making a ghost image visible anywhere throughout a theatre.

Many effects can be produced via Pepper's ghost. Since glass screens are less reflective than mirrors, they do not reflect matte black objects in the area hidden from the audience. Thus Pepper's ghost showmen sometimes used an invisible black-clad actor in the hidden area to manipulate brightly lit, light-coloured objects, which can thus appear to float in air. Pepper's very first public ghost show used a seated skeleton in a white shroud which was being manipulated by an unseen actor in black velvet robes. Hidden actors, whose heads were powdered white for reflection but whose clothes were matte black, could appear as disembodied heads when strongly lit and reflected by the angled glass screen.

Pepper's ghost can be adapted to make performers apparently materialise from nowhere or disappear into empty space. Pepper would sometimes greet an audience by suddenly materialising in the middle of the stage. The illusion can also apparently transform one object or person into another. For instance, Pepper sometimes suspended on stage a basket of oranges which then "transformed" into jars of marmalade.

Another 19th century Pepper's ghost entertainment featured a figure flying around a theatre backcloth painted as the sky. The hidden actor, lying under bright lights on a rotating, matte black table, wore a costume with metallic spangles to maximise reflection on the hidden glass screen. This foreshadows some 20th century cinema special effects.

== History ==
=== Precursors ===
Giambattista della Porta was a 16th-century Neapolitan scientist and scholar who is credited with a number of scientific innovations. His 1589 work Magia Naturalis (Natural Magic) includes a description of an illusion, titled "How we may see in a Chamber things that are not" that is the first known description of the Pepper's ghost effect.

Porta's description, from the 1658 English language translation (page 370), is as follows.

Let there be a chamber wherein no other light comes, unless by the door or window where the spectator looks in. Let the whole window or part of it be of glass, as we used to do to keep out the cold. But let one part be polished, that there may be a Looking-glass on bothe sides, whence the spectator must look in. For the rest do nothing. Let pictures be set over against this window, marble statues and suchlike. For what is without will seem to be within, and what is behind the spectator's back, he will think to be in the middle of the house, as far from the glass inward, as they stand from it outwardly, and clearly and certainly, that he will think he sees nothing but truth. But lest the skill should be known, let the part be made so where the ornament is, that the spectator may not see it, as above his head, that a pavement may come between above his head. And if an ingenious man do this, it is impossible that he should suppose that he is deceived.

From the mid-19th century, the illusion, today known as Pepper's ghost, became widely developed for money-making stage entertainments, amid bitter argument, patent disputes, and legal action concerning the technique's authorship. A popular genre of entertainment was stage demonstrations of scientific novelties. Simulations of ghostly phenomena through innovative optical technology fitted these well. Phantasmagoria shows, which simulated supernatural effects, were also familiar public entertainments. Previously, these had made much use of complex magic lantern techniques, like the multiple projectors, mobile projectors, and projection on mirrors and smoke, which had been perfected by Étienne-Gaspard Robert/Robertson in Paris early in the century. The new illusion, soon to be labelled Pepper's ghost, offered a completely different and more convincing way to produce ghost effects, using reflections not projection.

A claim to be the first user of the new illusion in theatres came from the Dutch-born stage magician Henrik Joseph Donckel, who became famous in France under the stage name Henri Robin. Robin said he had spent two years developing the illusion before trying it in 1847 during his regular shows of stage magic and the supernatural in Lyons. However, he found this early rendering of the ghost effect made little impression on the audience. He wrote: "The ghosts failed to achieve the full illusory effect which I have subsequently perfected." The shortcomings of his original techniques "caused me great embarrassment, I found myself forced to put them aside for a while."

While Robin later became famous for many effective, imaginative, and complex applications of Pepper's ghost at Robin's own theatre in Paris, such shows only began mid-1863 after John Henry Pepper had demonstrated his own method for staging the illusion at the London Polytechnic in December 1862. Jean-Eugène Robert-Houdin, contemporary French grand master of stage magic, regarded Robin's performances and other 1863 ghost shows in Paris as "plagiarists" of Pepper's innovation. Jim Steinmeyer, a modern technical and historical authority on Pepper's ghost, has expressed doubts as to the reliability of Robin's claims for his 1847 performances. Whatever Robin did in 1847, by his own account it produced nothing like the stage effect whereby Pepper, and later Robin himself, astonished and thrilled audiences during 1863.

In October 1852 Pierre Séguin, an artist, patented in France a portable peepshow-like toy for children, which he named the "polyoscope". This used the very same illusion, based on reflection, which ten years later Pepper and Dircks would patent in Britain under their own names. Although creating illusory images within a small box is appreciably different from delivering an illusion on stage, Séguin's 1852 patent was eventually to lead to the defeat of Pepper's 1863 attempt to control and license the Pepper's ghost technique in France as well as in Britain.

Pepper described Séguin's polyoscope:

"It consisted of a box with a small sheet of glass, placed at an angle of forty-five degrees, and it reflected a concealed table, with plastic figures, the spectre of which appeared behind the glass, and which young people who possessed the toy invited their companions to take out of the box, when it melted away, as it were, in their hands and disappeared."

In 1863, Henri Robin maintained that Séguin's polyoscope had been inspired by his own original version of the stage illusion, which Séguin had witnessed while painting magic lantern slides for another part of Robin's show.

=== Dircks and Pepper ===
Henry Dircks was an English engineer and practical inventor who from 1858 strove to find theatres which would implement his vision of a sensational new genre of drama featuring apparitions which interacted with actors on stage. He constructed a peepshow-like model which demonstrated how reflections on a glass screen could produce convincing illusions. He also outlined a series of plays featuring ghost effects, which his apparatus could enable, and worked out how complex illusions, like image transformations, could be achieved through the technique. But in terms of applying the effect in theatres, Dircks seemed unable to think beyond remodelling theatres to resemble his peepshow model. He produced a design for theatres which required costly, impractical rebuilding of an auditorium to host the illusion. The theatres which he approached were not interested. In another bid to attract interest, he advertised his models for sale and in late 1862 the models' manufacturer invited John Henry Pepper to view one.

John Henry Pepper was a scientific all-rounder who was both an effective public educator in science and an astute, publicity-conscious, commercial showman. In 1854, he became the director and sole lessee of the Royal Polytechnic where he held the title of Professor. The Polytechnic ran a mix of science education courses and eye-catching public displays of scientific innovations.

After seeing Dircks' peepshow model in 1862, Pepper quickly devised an ingenious twist whereby, through adding an angled sheet of glass and a screened-off orchestra pit, almost any theatre or hall could make the illusion visible to a large audience. The first public performance in December 1862—a scene from Charles Dickens's The Haunted Man—produced rapturous responses from audience and journalists. A deal was struck between Pepper and Dircks whereby they jointly patented the illusion. Dircks agreed to waive any share of profits for the satisfaction of seeing his idea implemented so effectively. Their joint patent was obtained provisionally in February 1863 and ratified in October 1863.

Before Dircks' partnership with Pepper was a full year old, Dircks published a book which accused Pepper of plotting to systematically stamp Pepper's name alone on their joint creation. According to Dircks, while Pepper took care to credit Dircks in any communications to the scientific community, everything which reached the general public—like newspaper reports, advertisements and theatre posters—mentioned Pepper alone. Whenever Dircks complained, he said, Pepper would blame careless journalists or theatre managers. However, the omission had occurred so repeatedly that Dircks believed that Pepper was deliberately striving to fix his name alone in the minds of the general public. A good half of Dircks' 106-page book, The Ghost, comprises such recriminations with detailed examples of how Pepper hid Dircks' name.

An earlier 1863 Spectator article had presented the Dircks/Pepper partnership thus:

"This admirable ghost is the offspring of two fathers…. To Mr. Dircks belongs the honour of having invented him…. and Professor Pepper has the merit of having improved him considerably, fitting him for the intercourse of mundane society, and even educating him for the stage."

=== Popularity ===
Short plays using the new ghost illusion swiftly became sensationally popular. Pepper staged many dramatic and profitable demonstrations, notably in the lecture theatre of London's Royal Polytechnic. By late 1863, the illusion's fame had spread extensively with ghost-centred plays performed at multiple London venues, Manchester, Glasgow, Paris, and New York. Royalty attended. There was even a shortage of plate glass because of demand from theatres for glass screens. A popular song from 1863 celebrated the "Patent Ghost":

At Music Halls, Theatres too,
This "Patent Ghost" they show.
The Goblin novelty to view,
Some thousands nightly go.

By his own account, Pepper, who was entitled to all profits, made considerable earnings from the patent. He ran his own performances and licensed other operators for money. In Britain, he was initially successful in suing some unlicensed imitators, deterring others by legal threats, and defeating a September 1863 court action by music-hall proprietors who challenged the patent. However, while in Paris in summer 1863 to assist a licensed performance, Pepper had proved unable to stop Henri Robin and several others who were already performing unlicensed versions there. Robin successfully cited Séguin's pre-existing patent of the polyoscope, of which Pepper had been ignorant. During the next four years Robin developed spectacular and original applications of the illusion in Paris. One famous Robin show depicted the great violinist Paganini being troubled in his sleep by a demon violinist, who repeatedly appeared and disappeared.

During the next two decades, performances using the illusion spread to several countries. In 1877 a patent was registered for the United States. In Britain, theatre productions using Pepper's ghost toured far outside major cities. The performers travelled with their own glass screens and became known as "spectral opera companies". Around a dozen such specialist theatre companies existed in Britain. A typical performance would comprise a substantial play where apparitions were central to the plot, like an adaption of Dickens' A Christmas Carol, followed by a short comic piece which also used ghost effects. One company, for instance, "The Original Pepper's Ghost and Spectral Opera Company" had 11 ghost-themed plays in its repertoire. Another such company during a single year, 1877, performed at 30 different places in Britain, usually for a week but sometimes for as long as six weeks. By the 1890s, however, novelty had faded and the vogue for such theatre was in steep decline. Pepper's ghost remained in use however at sensational entertainments comparable to "dark rides" or "ghost trains" at modern funfairs and amusement parks: a detailed account survives of audience participation in two macabre entertainments, which both used Pepper's ghost, within a "Tavern of the Dead" show which visited Paris and New York in the 1890s.

Since the 1860s, "Pepper's ghost" has become a universal term for any illusion produced via a reflection on an unnoticed glass screen. It is routinely applied to all versions of the illusion, which are now quite common in 21st century displays, peepshows, and installations in museums and amusement parks. However, the specific optics in these modern displays often follow Séguin's or Dircks' earlier designs rather than the modification for theatres which first brought Pepper's name into enduring usage.

== Modern uses ==
=== Systems ===
Several proprietary systems produce modern Pepper's ghost effects. The "Musion Eyeliner" uses thin metalized film placed across the front of the stage at an angle of 45 degrees towards the audience; recessed below the screen is a bright image supplied by an LED screen or powerful projector. When viewed from the audience's perspective, the reflected images appear to be on the stage. The "Cheoptics360" displays revolving 3D animations or special video sequences inside a four-sided transparent pyramid. This system is often used for retail environments and exhibitions.

=== Amusement parks ===
The world's largest implementation of this illusion can be found at The Haunted Mansion and Phantom Manor attractions at several Walt Disney Parks and Resorts. There, a 90-foot (27 m)-long scene features multiple Pepper's ghost effects, brought together in one scene. Guests travel along an elevated mezzanine, looking through a 30-foot (9.1 m)-tall pane of glass into an empty ballroom. Animatronic ghosts move in hidden black rooms beneath and above the mezzanine. A more advanced variation of the Pepper's Ghost effect is also used at The Twilight Zone Tower of Terror.

The walk-through attraction Turbidite Manor in Nashville, Tennessee, employs variations of the classic technique, enabling guests to see various spirits that also interact with the physical environment, viewable at a much closer proximity. The House at Haunted Hill, a Halloween attraction in Woodland Hills, California, employs a similar variation in its front window to display characters from its storyline.

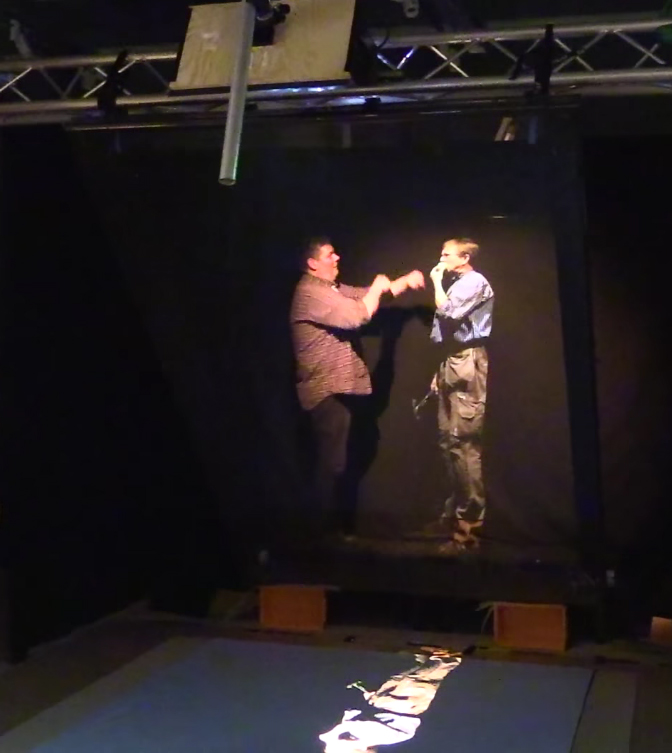
Projecting an image on the floor and reflecting it in a pane of glass allows a live actor (left) to interact with a projected "ghost"

An example that combines the Pepper's ghost effect with a live actor and film projection can be seen in the Mystery Lodge exhibit at the Knott's Berry Farm theme park in Buena Park, California, and the Ghosts of the Library exhibit at the Abraham Lincoln Presidential Library and Museum in Springfield, Illinois, as well as the depiction of Maori legends called A Millennium Ago at the Museum of Wellington City & Sea in New Zealand.

The Hogwarts Express attraction at Universal Studios Florida uses the Pepper's ghost effect, such that guests entering "Platform 9 3/4" seem to disappear into a brick wall when viewed from those further behind in the queue.

The Curse at Alton Manor, an attraction at the Alton Towers theme park in Staffordshire, England, uses multiple Pepper's ghost effects. These include the ride's preshow, where characters are projected inside an empty dollhouse before disappearing as the room is bathed in ultraviolet light, and a scene where Emily Alton, the attraction's central antagonist, appears in a corporeal form before vanishing, in a similar fashion to effects used at the Disney parks. The effect was also used in the ride's previous iterations, The Haunted House and Duel: The Haunted House Strikes Back; where Emily Alton and her cat Snowy could be seen as small corporeal ghosts inside a doll's house in the attraction's queue, similar to the preshow in the current iteration of the attraction.

=== Museums ===
Museums increasingly use Pepper's ghost exhibits to create attractions that appeal to visitors. In the mid-1970s James Gardener designed the Changing Office installation in the London Science Museum, consisting of a 1970s-style office that transforms into an 1870s-style office as the audience watches. It was designed and built by Will Wilson and Simon Beer of Integrated Circles. Another particularly intricate Pepper's ghost display is the Eight Stage Ghost built for the British Telecom Showcase Exhibition in London in 1978. This display follows the history of electronics in a number of discrete transitions.

More modern examples of Pepper's ghost effects can be found in various museums in the United Kingdom and Europe. Examples of these in the United Kingdom are the ghost of Annie McLeod at the New Lanark World Heritage Site, the ghost of John McEnroe at the Wimbledon Lawn Tennis Museum, which reopened in new premises in 2006, and one of Sir Alex Ferguson, which opened at the Manchester United Museum in 2007.

In October 2008 a life-sized Pepper's ghost of Shane Warne was opened at the Australian Sports Museum in Melbourne, Australia. The effect was also used at the Dickens World attraction at Chatham Maritime, Kent, United Kingdom. Both the York Dungeon and the Edinburgh Dungeon use the effect in the context of their "Ghosts" shows.

Another example can be found at the Our Planet Centre in Castries, Saint Lucia, which opened in May 2011, where a life-size Charles III and Governor-General of the island appear on stage talking about climate change.

German company Musion installed a holostage in the German Football Museum in Dortmund in 2016.

=== Television, film and video ===
The 1940 film Beyond Tomorrow uses the technique to show the three ghosts in the second half of the film.

Teleprompters are a modern implementation of Pepper's ghost used by the television industry. They reflect a speech or script and are commonly used for live broadcasts such as news programmes.

A 1985 episode of Mr. Wizard's World demonstrates Pepper's ghost in one of its educational segments.

On 1 June 2013, ITV broadcast Les Dawson: An Audience With That Never Was. The program featured a Pepper's ghost projection of Les Dawson, presenting content for a 1993 edition of An Audience with... to be hosted by Dawson but unused due to his death two weeks before recording.

In the 1990 movie Home Alone, the technique is used to show Harry with his head in flames, as the result of a blowtorch from a home invasion gone bad. CGI was not able to produce the desired results. The James Bond movie Diamonds are Forever features the girl-to-gorilla trick in one scene.

Early electro-mechanical arcade machines, such as Midway's "Stunt Pilot" and Bally's "Road Runner," both made in 1971, use the effect to allow player-controlled moving vehicles to appear to share the same space as various obstacles within a diorama. Electrical contacts, connected to the control linkages, sense the position of the vehicle and obstacles, simulating collisions in the games' logic circuits without the models physically touching each other. Various arcade games, most notably Taito's 1978 video game Space Invaders and Sega's 1991 video game Time Traveler, used a mirror-based variation of the illusion to make the game's graphics appear against an illuminated backdrop. Further, before the advent of flat screen displays, many arcade game units used a simple mirror to reflect the image from a bulky CRT display in the base of the unit to give the impression that the display was in front of the player, while allowing a slimmer form factor (less square-footage of floor space used).

The effect has been used in a few pinball games, in the Pinball 2000 system games at the back of the playfield, in Stern's Ghostbusters, and more extensively in Jersey Jack's Dialed In!.

In “…Gets a Bright Idea", the fifth episode of the third season of The Magic School Bus, Arnold’s conniving cousin Janet uses the Pepper’s Ghost technique on Arnold to try to convince the rest of Ms. Frizzle’s class that a theater is haunted. During the "Producer Says" segment at the end of episode, a method of producing the effect on a small scale is explained and demonstrated.

=== Concerts ===
An illusion based on Pepper's ghost involving projected images has been featured at music concerts (often erroneously marketed as "holographic").

At the 2006 Grammy Awards, the Pepper's ghost technique was used to project Madonna with the virtual members of the band Gorillaz onto the stage in a "live" performance. This type of system consists of a projector, usually DLP, or LED screen, with a resolution of 1280×1024 or higher and brightness of at least 5,000 lumens, a high-definition video player, a stretched film between the audience and the acting area, a 3D set/drawing that encloses three sides, plus lighting, audio, and show control.

During Dr. Dre and Snoop Dogg's performance at the 2012 Coachella Valley Music and Arts Festival, a projection of deceased rapper Tupac Shakur appeared and performed "Hail Mary" and "2 of Amerikaz Most Wanted".

On 18 May 2014, during the Billboard Music Awards, an illusion of deceased pop star Michael Jackson, other dancers, and the entire stage set was projected onto the stage for a performance of the song "Slave to the Rhythm" from the posthumous Xscape album.

On 21 September 2017, the Frank Zappa estate announced plans to conduct a reunion tour with the Mothers of Invention that would make use of Pepper's ghosts of Frank Zappa and the settings from his studio albums. Initially scheduled to run through 2018, the tour was later pushed back to 2019.

A projection of Ronnie James Dio performed at the Wacken Open Air festival in 2016.

The London concert attraction ABBA Voyage uses an elaborate version of Pepper’s ghost combined with digital projection and motion-capture technology.

=== Political speeches and protest ===
NChant 3D telecast, live, a 55-minute speech by Narendra Modi, then-Chief Minister of Gujarat, to 53 locations across Gujarat on 10 December 2012 during the assembly elections. In April 2014, they projected Narendra Modi again at 88 locations across India.

In 2014, then-Prime Minister Recep Tayyip Erdoğan delivered a speech via Pepper's ghost in Izmir.

In 2017, French Presidential candidate Jean-Luc Mélenchon gave a speech using Pepper's ghost at a campaign event in Aubervilliers.

In Madrid, on 10 April 2015, a public visual presentation called "Hologramas por la Libertad" (Holograms for Liberty), featuring a ghostly virtual crowd of demonstrators, was used to protest a new Spanish law that prohibits citizens from demonstrating in public places. Although widely called a "hologram protest" in news reports, no actual holography was involved – it was yet another technologically updated variant of the Pepper's ghost illusion.

=== Fashion ===
In 2011, in Beijing, apparel company Burberry produced the "Burberry Prorsum Autumn/Winter 2011 Hologram Runway Show", which included life size 2-D projections of models. The company's own video shows several centered and off-center shots of the main 2-dimensional projection screen, the latter revealing the flatness of the virtual models. The claim that holography was used was reported as fact in the trade media.

== See also ==
- Camera lucida – Optical drawing aid
- Camera obscura
- Catadioptric telescope
- Front projection effect
- Head-up display – Transparent display presenting data within normal sight lines of the user
- Magic lantern – Type of image projector
- Optical illusion – Visually perceived images that differ from objective reality
- Reflector sight – Optical device for aiming
- Schüfftan process
