= The Tomten and the Fox =

2019 film by Are Austnes and Yaprak Morali

- Based on: The Tomten and The Tomten and the Fox by Astrid Lindgren
- Screenplay by: Ingrid Haukelidsæter; Mina Juni Stenebråten; Are Austnes
- Directed by: Are Austnes; Yaprak Morali
- Music by: Joakim Berg; Gaute Storaas
- Country of origin: Norway
- Original language: Norwegian

Production
- Producers: Laurent Guittard; Thomas Gustafsson; Ove Heiborg
- Cinematography: Sunit Parekh
- Running time: 9 minutes

Original release
- Release: 23 December 2019

The Tomten and the Fox (Norwegian: Reven og Nissen) is a Norwegian short animation film by Are Austnes and Yaprak Morali. It is the second film adaptation of the books The Tomten and The Tomten and the Fox by Astrid Lindgren, which are based on the poems by Viktor Rydberg and Karl-Erik Forsslund. The film was broadcast in December 2019 in Norway, and also in Sweden as Räven och Tomten.

== Plot ==
At Christmas Eve the hungry fox Mickel walks through the snowy forest looking for food. He encounters two mice, but his attempts to catch them fail. Later Mickel discovers a farm. Hungrily, he looks through the window into the living room where he sees all the Christmas candy, but isn't able to get into the room. Then he sees that the door of the chicken coop is open. Just when he wants to catch a chicken, he is dragged outside by the Nisse (Norwegian-Danish)/Tomte (Swedish), the elf of the farm. Outside, the Nisse tells him that he is taking care of the chickens and Mickel must not steal them, but the Nisse also notices how hungry Mickel is. Shortly afterwards, a girl puts a plate with Christmas porridge for the Nisse onto the doorstep. The Nisse offers to share the food with the fox and to do this every winter night. Mickel accepts and eats the porridge. On his way back to the forest Mickel passes the two mice again. The mice are scared, but Mickel gives them a pine cone that has rolled away and smiles at the mice. Then he continues his walk.

== Broadcast ==
Reven og Nissen was first broadcast in Norway on December 23, 2019, on the television channel NRK Super. One day later the film was also shown in Sweden. It was broadcast as Räven och Tomten on the TV channel SVT1, where it was shown in front of a Christmas special of Donald Duck.

== Overview ==
Reven og Nissen is based on the stories The Tomten and The Tomten and the Fox by Astrid Lindgren. The stories were based on the poems by Viktor Rydberg and Karl-Erik Forsslund. The CGI animations from the film are based on the illustrations by Eva Eriksson of the book The Tomten and the Fox.

In the film only the Nisse and the narrator speak a few sentences. Some of these are taken literally from Astrid Lindgren's books.

The animation company Qvisten Animation AS produced the film and it is directed by Are Austnes and Yaprak Morali.

== Awards ==
Annecy International Animation Film Festival

- 2020: Young Audience Award (Are Austnes, Yaprak Morali)

== Music ==
The theme song for the film was composed by Joakim Berg, the singer of the Swedish rock band Kent. Berg processed the poem by Karl-Erik Forsslund, on which the book by Astrid Lindgren is based, into a song. The title Räven Och Tomten is sung by Peter Jöback and Moonica Mac. It is produced by Peter Kvint. The background music was composed by the Norwegian jazz musician Gaute Storaas based on the melody by Joakim Berg. The theme song was released on December 24, 2019, by Universal Music. Tomte also whistles the Norwegian Christmas song På låven sitter nissen as he gets the plate of porridge for himself and Mickel.
