= William Boniface =

Author of children's books

- Born: Jon Anderson; October 17, 1963 (age 62); Yankton, South Dakota, US
- Education: University of Minnesota (BS)
- Occupations: Book publisher and children's book author

Jon Anderson (born October 17, 1963, in Yankton, South Dakota), who uses the pseudonym William Boniface, is an American author of children's picture books, as well as a book publisher. As an author, his works include the Five Little... series, Max the Minnow series, and The Extraordinary Adventures of an Ordinary Boy series. The Ordinary Boy books, which focus on a setting where everybody has a superpower, have been recommended for classroom use. In 2010, Boniface's Lights Out, Night’s Out tied for the gold medal for the Independent Publisher Book Award for Children's Picture Books.

Boniface received a Bachelor of Science in marketing from the University of Minnesota.

As a bookseller and book publisher, Boniface has worked with multiple notable organizations. Early in his career, he worked at B. Dalton and Barnes & Noble for nearly two decades, ranging from sales clerk to heading the children's buying division. He then became the vice president and publisher of Price Stern Sloan and Penguin Putnam's’s DreamWorks publishing program. From 2004 to 2009, Boniface was the president and publisher of Running Press, after which he became the executive vice president and publisher of Simon & Schuster's children's division. In 2013, Boniface was promoted to president of the division.

As of 2026, Boniface lives in Connecticut.

== Works ==
- Welcome to Dinsmore, the World's Greatest Store, illustrated by Tom Kerr, Andrews McMeel Publishing (Kansas City, MO), 1995.
- Mystery in Bugtown, illustrated by Jim Harris, Accord (Denver, CO), 1997.
- The Adventures of Max the Minnow, illustrated by Don Sullivan, Accord (Denver, CO), 1997.
- The Treasure Hunter, illustrated by Jim Harris, Accord (Denver, CO), 1998, board-book edition, 2006.
- Trim the Tree for Christmas, illustrated by Debbie Palen, Price Stern Sloan (New York, NY), 2000.
- Christmastime Is Cookie Time, illustrated by Ronnie Rooney, Price Stern Sloan (New York, NY), 2001.
- What Do You Want on Your Sundae?, illustrated by Debbie Palen, Price Stern Sloan (New York, NY), 2001.
- What Do You Want in Your Cereal Bowl, illustrated by Ronnie Rooney, Price Stern Sloan (New York, NY), 2002.
- Santa's Sleigh Is Full!: A Top This! Book, illustrated by Ronnie Rooney, Price Stern Sloan (New York, NY), 2002.
- The Stars Came out on Christmas, illustrated by Stephen Waterhouse, Price Stern Sloan (New York, NY), 2002.
- Five Little Pumpkins, illustrated by Jerry Smath, Price Stern Sloan (New York, NY), 2002.
- Five Little Ghosts, illustrated by Jerry Smath, Price Stern Sloan (New York, NY), 2002.
- Easter Bunnies Everywhere: A Top This! Book, illustrated by Ronnie Rooney, Price Stern Sloan (New York, NY), 2003.
- Five Little Bunny Rabbits, illustrated by Lynn Adams, Price Stern Sloan (New York, NY), 2003.
- Five Little Candy Hearts, illustrated by Lynn Adams, Price Stern Sloan (New York, NY), 2003.
- Five Little Christmas Angels, illustrated by Lynn Adams, Price Stern Sloan (New York, NY), 2003.
- Five Little Easter Eggs, illustrated by Lynn Adams, Price Stern Sloan (New York, NY), 2003.
- Five Little Christmas Trees, illustrated by Lynn Adams, Price Stern Sloan (New York, NY), 2003.
- Five Little Christmas Turkeys, illustrated by Lynn Adams, Price Stern Sloan (New York, NY), 2003.
- Max Makes Millions (sequel to The Adventures of Max the Minnow), illustrated by Dan Vasconsellos, Accord (Riverside, NJ), 2005.
- The Extraordinary Adventures of Ordinary Boy: The Hero Revealed, illustrated by Stephen Gilpin, HarperCollins (New York, NY), 2006.
- The Extraordinary Adventures of Ordinary Boy: The Great Powers Outage, illustrated by Stephen Gilpin
- The Extraordinary Adventures of Ordinary Boy: The Return of the Meteor Boy?, illustrated by Stephen Gilpin, HarperCollins (New York, NY), 2007.
- Lights Out, Night's Out, illustrated by Milena Kirkova
- Chicka Chicka Ho Ho Ho, illustrated by Julien Chung, Beach Lane, 2024.
