= The Haunted Man and the Ghost's Bargain =

1848 novella by Charles Dickens

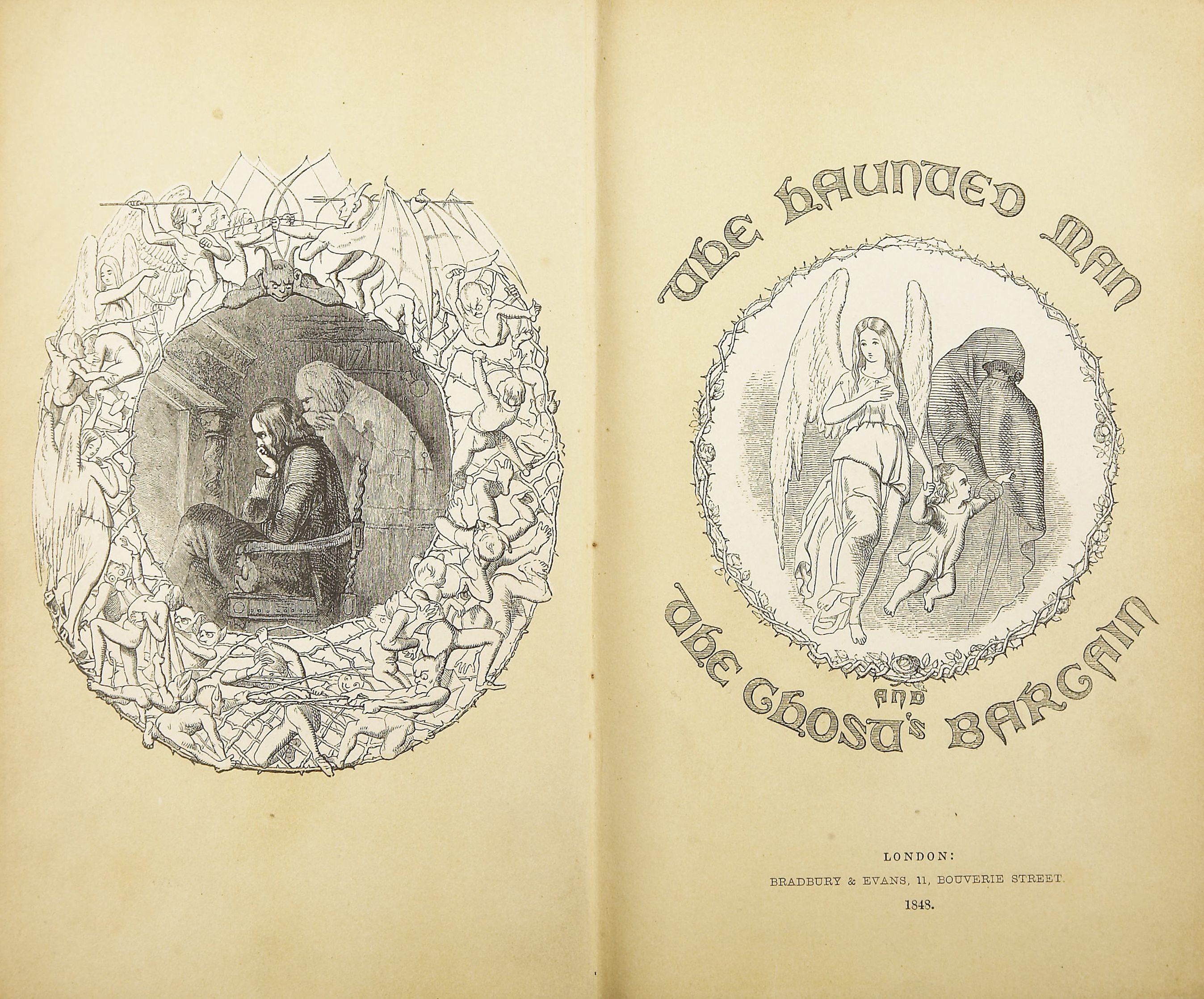
- Frontispiece of first edition, 1848
- Author: Charles Dickens
- Original title: The Haunted Man and the Ghost’s Bargain, A Fancy for Christmas-Time
- Illustrator: Sir John Tenniel; Frank Stone; William Clarkson Stanfield; John Leech
- Language: English
- Genre: Novella
- Publisher: Bradbury & Evans
- Publication date: 19 December 1848
- Publication place: England
- Media type: Print (Hardcover & Paperback)
- Pages: 188 pp
- Preceded by: The Battle of Life

The Haunted Man and the Ghost's Bargain: A Fancy for Christmas-Time is a novella by Charles Dickens first published in 1848. It is the last of Dickens's five Christmas novellas, following A Christmas Carol (1843), The Chimes (1844), The Cricket on the Hearth (1845) and The Battle of Life (1846).

The same year it was published The Haunted Man was adapted for the West End stage when it was performed at the Adelphi Theatre in December 1848, and it received renewed vigour in an 1862 Christmas Eve production which saw the first public demonstration of "Pepper's ghost"—a method of projecting the illusion of a ghost into a theatre (named after its designer John Henry Pepper)—which caused a sensation among those in attendance at the Regent Street theatre in London.

== Plot summary ==
=== The Gift Bestowed ===
Redlaw is a teacher of chemistry who often broods over wrongs done him and grief from his past. He is attended to by his servants William Swidger; Swidger's 87-year-old father Philip; and Swidger's wife Milly, who serves as cook and who, with the father, helps decorate Redlaw's rooms with holly.

He is haunted by a spirit, who is not so much a ghost as Redlaw's phantom twin and is "an awful likeness of himself...with his features, and his bright eyes, and his grizzled hair, and dressed in the gloomy shadow of his dress..." This Ghost appears and proposes to Redlaw that he can allow him to "forget the sorrow, wrong, and trouble you have known...to cancel their remembrance..." The Ghost also promises that Redlaw will have the power to bestow this same gift on anyone he meets. Redlaw is hesitant at first, but finally agrees.

After the Ghost bestows his gift, a child dressed in rags with no shoes appears in Redlaw's house. He seems terrified of Redlaw but becomes his unwilling companion.

=== The Gift Diffused ===
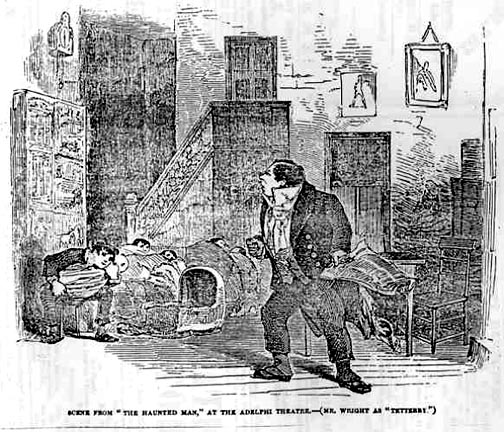
Scene from The Haunted Man at the Adelphi Theatre, in the Illustrated London News, 30 December 1848.

The Tetterbys live in their shop, which has been all manner of unsuccessful businesses in the past. They have many children and are quite poor. Mrs Tetterby comes home from marketing and confesses her deep shame that she fantasized about never having married Mr Tetterby when she saw all the things she could not afford.

Redlaw has followed her inside the house and startles the couple. He inquires after their boarder, Mr Denham, who is one of his students. Denham has been severely ill. Redlaw visits with him and bestows his gift of forgetting all that Denham has suffered. When Milly arrives to tend to Denham, Redlaw has started to realize that his gift is more of a curse. He begs Denham to help him hide so that he does not curse Milly with forgetting her woes.

Denham is rude and dismissive of Milly, who has been his faithful nurse over the course of his illness. Redlaw is now horrified by how transformed people are when they forget the pain in their lives.

He pays the mysterious child to take him to the Swidgers. With no pockets to keep his coins in, the child puts them in his mouth. At the Swidgers' lodgings, Redlaw bestows his gift. The 87-year old patriarch goes from doting on his eldest son who is suffering from a fatal illness to not recognizing him at all.

=== The Gift Reversed ===
Redlaw is disgusted with all the misery he has caused by making people forget. He begs the Ghost to remove the gift from everyone he has infected, even if it means that Redlaw will remain forgetful. The Ghost explains that the barefooted child is the embodiment of Redlaw's curse of forgetfulness. When mankind cannot remember its sorrows, it becomes insensate and feral. The child is an example of what indifference reaps.

Redlaw takes pity on the child and covers him as he sleeps. The curse is lifted, and all of the characters' memories are restored. Denham apologizes to Milly for being so dreadfully ungrateful.

Redlaw realizes that "Christmas is a time in which, of all times in the year, the memory of every remediable sorrow, wrong, and trouble in the world around us, should be active with us," and he makes peace with his painful memories.

== Performances ==
In what would be the first public performance of the technique known as "Pepper's ghost", John Henry Pepper staged a Christmas Eve production of the play in 1862 at the Royal Polytechnic Institution (currently known as the University of Westminster) in 309 Regent Street. It was very well received, if only for the new apparatus's ability to project a ghost so as to look as though it is interacting with those on stage. The Times reported:

‘We really do not think we say a word too much in praise when we call this “strange lecture” one of the most curious displays in London. The spectres and illusions are thrown upon the stage in such a perfect embodiment of real substance that it is not till the haunted man walks through their apparently solid forms that the audience can believe in their being optical illusions at all’.

An instant success, the play transferred to the Polytechnic's large theatre and continued to be performed throughout 1863, with the Prince of Wales (future King Edward VII) bringing his new bride (later Queen Alexandra) to see the illusion.

== See also ==
- List of Christmas-themed literature
