= The Tomten (Astrid Lindgren) =

Book series by Astrid Lindgren

The Tomten books
- 1. The Tomten; 2. The Tomten and the Fox
- Author: Astrid Lindgren
- Country: Sweden
- Language: English
- Publisher: Rabén & Sjögren
- Published: 1960, 1965
- No. of books: 2

The Tomten books are two children's books written by Astrid Lindgren. They are based on poems by Viktor Rydberg and Karl-Erik Forsslund.

== Plot ==
=== The Tomten ===
During the night the people at a farm in a forest are asleep. Only Tomten is awake. No one has ever seen Tomten, the people only know that he is there. Sometimes the people only find his small footprints in the snow. Tomten takes care of the animals and gives them comfort through a cold winter's night. He promises them that spring will be there soon. Tomten also visits the children, who always want to see him, but they are always at sleep when he comes, so they dream about him.

=== The Tomten and the Fox ===
The fox Mickel is hungry and has not found food for a long time. On Christmas Eve, he comes across a farm in the forest. He goes into the chicken's shed and wants to eat a chicken, but he is stopped by Tomten, who knows how hungry a fox can be in such a cold winter's night. When a child leaves a plate of groat on the doorstep for Tomten, the latter wants to share it with Mickel. He tells Mickel that he would share it every night with him if he needs to. Mickel is happy, full and goes back into the forest.

== Background ==
The poem Tomten was written by Viktor Rydberg in 1881. In 1957, it was published in the children's magazine Klumpe Dumpe with illustrations by Harald Wiberg. At the time, Astrid Lindgren worked as an editor at the book publishing company Rabén & Sjögren. She wanted to publish the poem and the illustrations in a book form and tried to convince the company to do so. In 1960, the book with the illustrations by Wiberg was published by Rabén & Sjögren and was an immediate success.

Lindgren was so enthusiastic about the book and the illustrations that she wanted to publish the book in other countries. The publishers agreed, but they wanted Lindgren to write another text to the pictures, which she did, but she omitted the metaphysical considerations from the poem. This version of the book was released in the same year in Germany. One year later it was published in the United States and other countries. In these countries, Rydberg's name no longer appeared on the book's title, instead Lindgren's name was mentioned. In 1965, a classic poem by Karl-Erik Forsslund was published next to illustrations by Wiberg in Sweden. For the release in other countries, Lindgren wrote a new text to the pictures. The English edition, The Tomten and the Fox, was published the same year.

In 2012, 52 years after the publication of the first German edition of Tomte Tummetott (The Tomten), Lindgren's version of the book was first published in Swedish. That year the German publisher found her original writings in his archives and brought it back to Sweden. The book contains new illustrations by Kitty Crowther. In 2017, the book Räven och tomten (The Tomten and the Fox) was published in Sweden, newly illustrated by Eva Eriksson.

== Tomten in other works by Lindgren ==
Lindgren also writes about Tomten and the Fox in her other works. Both characters are mentioned in the novel Seacrow Island. The main character Tjorven leaves a plate with groat on the doorstep for Tomten (in the English edition it is Father Christmas), just like her grandmother had done years ago. Next morning it is empty. While Tjorven is sure that Tomten had it, her friend Pelle believes that the hungry fox that lives on the island has taken the food. In the accompanying television series, Life on Seacrow Island, the viewer sees how the fox eats a salami bread that Tjorven puts to the groats. Tjorven believes Tomte has eaten the salami bread. At the end of the episode, the song "Gläns över sjö och strand" is sung, which is based on another poem by Rydberg.

== Films ==
Two films have been made based on Lindgren's Tomten books.

In 2007 the German film Tomte Tummetott and the Fox was made. It is a stop motion animation, which has also been translated into English. The English version was released on the German DVD edition of the film (Tomte Tummetott und der Fuchs). The DVD also has the Tomte Tummetott song in English, German and Swedish.

Another Norwegian film adaptation, The Tomten and the Fox (Reven og Nissen), was made in 2019. It was first shown on 23 December, in Norway (Reven og Nissen) and on 24 December, in Sweden (Räven och Tomten). The film was produced by Qvisten Animation AS in collaboration with the Astrid Lindgren Company. The Tomten and the Fox is approximately 9 minutes long and was directed by Are Austnes and Yaprak Morali. The title song was composed by Joakim Berg, the singer in the Swedish rock band Kent. For this purpose, he rewrote the poem by Karl-Erik Forsslund, on which the book by Lindgren is based, into a song. The title "Räven och Tomten" song is sung by Peter Jöback and Moonica Mac.

== Reception ==
Kirkus Reviews gave the book The Tomten a starred review and said that a fascinating story and "Harald Wiberg's darkly luminous rendition of a tranquil snowy farm" turn the book into a great bedtime story for children and leave a lot of room for fantasy.

The writer Sarah Moore Fitzgerald called The Tomten and the Fox "gentle, benign and soothing" and was her favorite book as a child.
