= The Battle of Life =

1846 novella by Charles Dickens

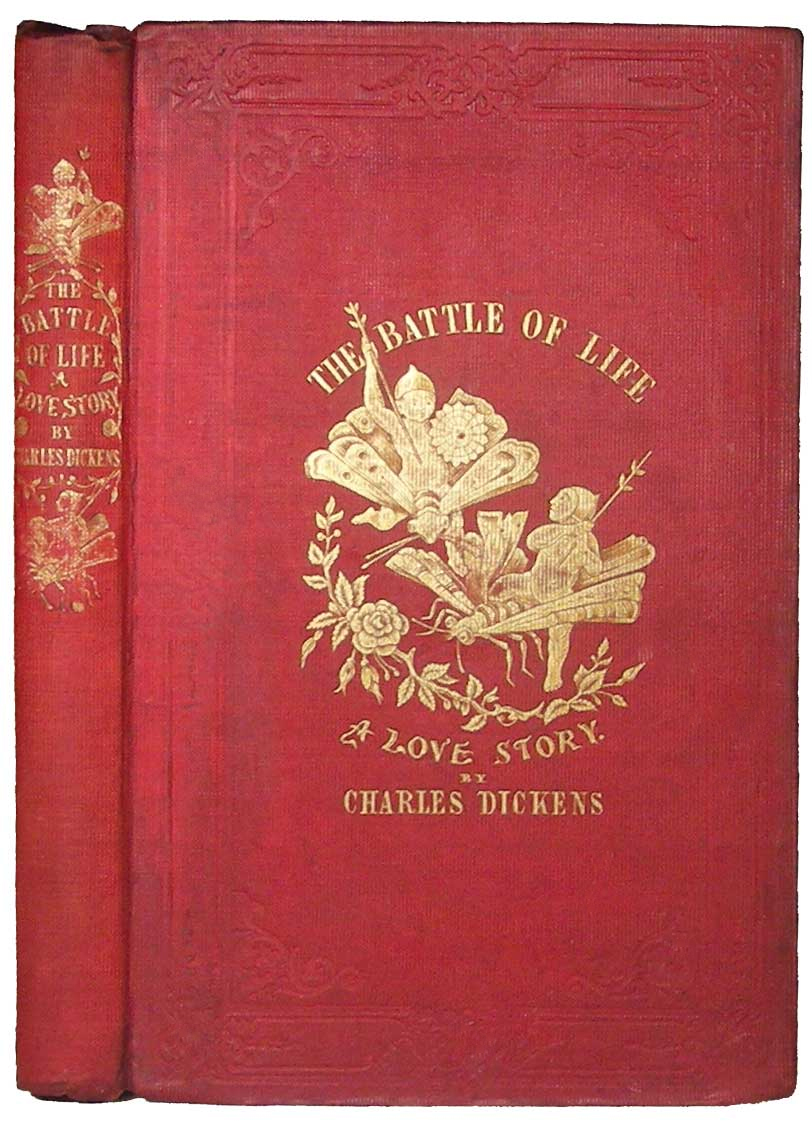
- Cover of the first edition of The Battle of Life from 1846.
- Author: Charles Dickens
- Original title: The Battle of Life: A Love Story
- Illustrator: Charles Green
- Language: English
- Genre: Novella
- Publisher: Bradbury and Evans
- Publication date: 1846
- Publication place: England
- Media type: Print (hardback)
- Pages: 116 pp
- Preceded by: The Cricket on the Hearth
- Followed by: The Haunted Man and the Ghost's Bargain
- Text: The Battle of Life at Wikisource

The Battle of Life: A Love Story is an 1846 novella by Charles Dickens. It is the fourth of his five "Christmas Books", coming after The Cricket on the Hearth and followed by The Haunted Man and the Ghost's Bargain.

== Plot ==
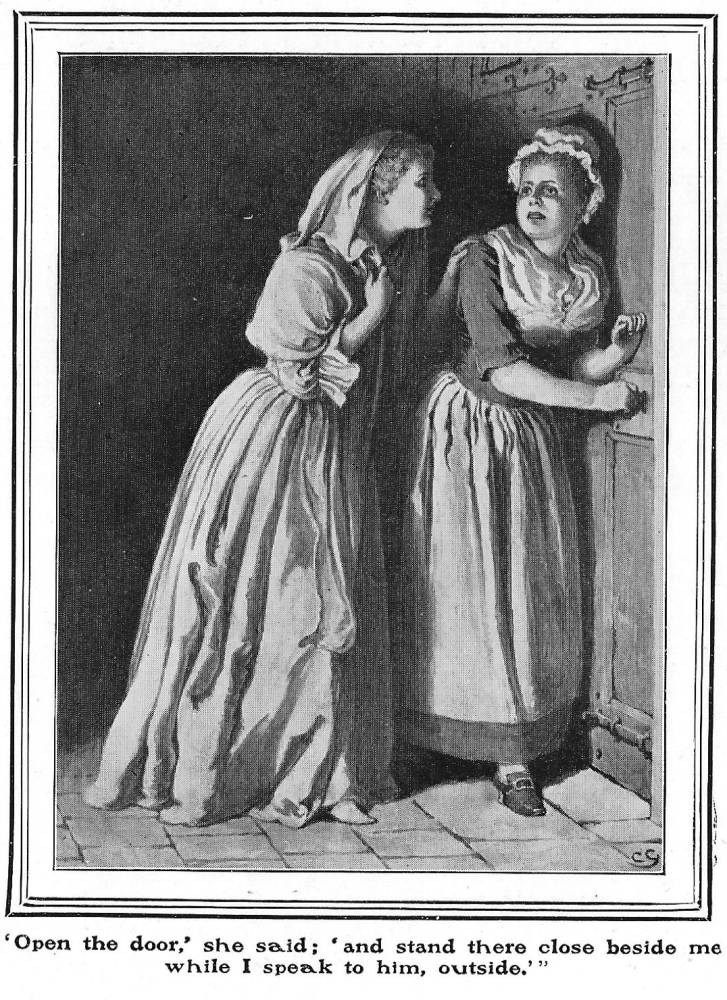
"Open the door," she said; "and stand there close beside me, while I speak to him, outside." Illustration by Charles Green.

Two sisters, Grace and Marion, live happily in an English village with their two servants, Clemency Newcome and Ben Britain, and their good-natured widower father Dr Jeddler. Dr Jeddler is a man whose philosophy is to treat life as a farce. Marion, the younger sister, is betrothed to Alfred Heathfield, Jeddler's ward, who is leaving the village to complete his studies. Alfred entrusts Marion to Grace's care and makes a promise to return to win her hand.

Michael Warden, a libertine who is about to leave the country, is thought by the solicitors Snitchey and Craggs to be about to seduce the younger sister into an elopement. Clemency spies Marion one night at a clandestine rendezvous with Warden, and Marion disappears on the very day that Alfred is due to return.

Clemency marries Ben and the couple set up a tavern in the village. After recovering from her heartbreak at Warden's elopement with Marion, Grace marries Alfred and bears him a daughter, also called Marion. On the day of the child's birth, six years after her disappearance, Marion re-appears to explain herself: she had not eloped with Warden, but had moved away to live with her aunt Martha, so as to allow Alfred the chance to fall in love with Grace. The man she had herself loved had not been Alfred, but Warden. Marion is reunited with her family. Warden returns, and is forgiven by Dr Jeddler. Warden and Marion are married.

== Title ==
The setting is an English village that stands on the site of an historic battle. Some characters refer to "the battle" as a metaphor for the struggles of life.

== Reception ==
The novella is one of Dickens's lesser-known works and has never attained any high level of popularity, in contrast to some of his other Christmas Books.

== Stage adaptation ==
An adaptation of The Battle of Life by Albert Richard Smith was produced with success at the Surrey Theatre in 1846.
