= A Jolly Good Fellow (novel) =

2008 novel by Stephen V. Masse

- First edition
- Author: Stephen V. Masse
- Language: English
- Genre: Crime novel
- Publisher: Good Harbor Press
- Publication date: 2008
- Publication place: United States
- Media type: Print (paperback)
- Pages: 203 pp
- ISBN: 0-9799638-0-X
- OCLC: 179795203

A Jolly Good Fellow (2008) is a novel by American author Stephen V. Masse.

== Plot introduction ==
A fake charity Santa Claus plots to kidnap the eleven-year-old son of a State Representative, but the plot goes topsy-turvy when the boy decides to run away from home by hitchhiking.

== Plot summary ==
Two weeks before Christmas in Boston, Duncan Wagner, a lone down-and-outer who has been living in self-imposed exile for several years, kidnaps Gabriel Booker, the eleven-year-old son of State Representative Winthrop Booker. Wagner takes the child to his apartment and ties him to a chair in front of the television, then leaves for work as a self-employed charity Santa Claus. When Wagner returns to his apartment, Gabriel is no longer in the chair. Thinking the boy has fled, Wagner goes into his room and finds him sleeping on the bed.

In spite of a lingering edginess, the two grow more cordial toward each other. Wagner locks Gabriel's ankle to a long chain to make sure he doesn't run away. Gabriel hounds Wagner to supply him with Christmas decorations and other goodies to help pass the time. Wagner awkwardly complies. Gabriel turns out to be a vegetarian. And a bed wetter.

After a day, Wagner makes a ransom demand for one hundred thousand dollars from Representative Booker. Almost immediately the missing child case turns into an Amber alert and dominates news headlines.

One night Wagner, bothered by the clinking sound of the chain, unlocks Gabriel's ankle in order to have a decent sleep. In the morning, Gabriel is gone and with him, all Duncan's charity money. Duncan goes to town in his Santa suit, hoping to elude hordes of police he is sure will swarm to his apartment. While in town, he helps a street artist, Martina, whose purse is being rifled by a pair of thieves. He realizes Martina has an eye for his Santa character, though he also realizes that by kidnapping Gabriel, he has imprisoned himself as well.

== Awards and nominations ==
- 2008 Independent Publisher Book Awards, silver medal (U.S. North-East - Best Regional Fiction)
- 2008 New England Book Festival, honorable mention (Best books of the holiday season/fiction)
- 2009 Allbooks Review Editor's Choice Award 2nd place nominee (Mystery/Suspense)

== Publication history ==
- 2008, USA, Good Harbor Press ISBN 978-0-9799638-0-3 Paperback (OUT OF PRINT) see below
- 2008, USA, Calderwood Books ISBN 978-1-934614-34-1 Electronic Book (OUT OF PRINT) see below
- 2025 USA Good Harbor Press revised with new title: CHRISTMAS RANSOM ISBN 978-0-9799638-7-2
