= Mandie =

American children's book series

The Mandie books are a children's historical mystery series written by Lois Gladys Leppard. There are forty novels in the main series and eight in the junior series, along with several special books. The story starts around the year 1900 when Mandie finds a mystery to solve with her friends, most frequently Joe Woodard and Celia Hamilton. The main setting is North Carolina in the early 20th century, although Mandie and her friends travel to Charleston, Washington, D.C., Europe and New York City throughout the series.

The series was successful; by 2001, more than six million Mandie books had been sold. Leppard said that she could write a Mandie book in two weeks, barring any interruptions. A direct-to-video film based on the first book, Mandie and the Secret Tunnel, was produced in 2009, starring Lexi Johnson and Dean Jones.

== Background ==
Mandie was born on June 6, 1888 and grew up in a log cabin in Swain County, North Carolina, with her father Jim Shaw, her stepmother Etta, and her stepsister Irene. She knew nothing about her family background until her father died. Mandie was soon sent away to live with the Brysons to take care of their baby son. Then her father's old friend, Ned Sweetwater, a Cherokee Indian, came to take her away from the family who treated her cruelly. He brought her to the home of her father's brother, John Shaw, who Mandie had never met and knew little of.

In Mandie and the Secret Tunnel, Mandie is reunited with her birth mother, Elizabeth, in Franklin, North Carolina. She learns the truth about her history that her paternal grandmother was Cherokee. Mandie is immensely proud of her Cherokee heritage, and she soon makes many friends among the Cherokee people. However, several times throughout the series Mandie is teased for her heritage.

Many of the books in the series are spent in Cherokee, North Carolina, where she stays with her uncle, always managing to find a mystery to solve. In Mandie and the Cherokee Treasure, she finds a cave with gold that belonged to a Cherokee warrior. She gives the gold to the Cherokees to help them build a new hospital. In Mandie and the Forbidden Attic, Mandie attends Miss Heathwood's Boarding School for Girls in Asheville, North Carolina where she is taught how to act like a lady of high society.

In the last published novel, New Horizons (2006), Mandie and her friends attend college at College of Charleston Ladies' College in Charleston, South Carolina. There Mandie pursues a major in business administration and a minor in English literature and visual art. New Horizons is called the "Book One" of the Mandie: Her College Days series, but was the only one to be published before the author's death.

== Themes ==
The Mandie books are Christian fiction, as well as mystery in structure. Mandie prays when troubled, and attempts to demonstrate Christian virtues of tolerance and compassion. Mandie is proud to be part Cherokee, and she has a diverse group of friends, including a girl with intellectual disability. Some critics have noted that the Cherokee and African American characters are at times depicted sentimentally and speak in a stereotypical dialect. For instance, Uncle Ned's speech is filled with terms like "happy hunting grounds", "squaw", and "papoose".

== Author ==
Author Lois Gladys Leppard was a Federal Civil Service employee in various countries around the world. She made her home in South Carolina until she died on October 5, 2008. Stories of her own mother's childhood are the basis for many of the incidents incorporated in this series.

== Mandie series ==
1. Mandie and the Secret Tunnel (1983)
2. Mandie and the Cherokee Legend (1983)
3. Mandie and the Ghost Bandits (1984)
4. Mandie and the Forbidden Attic (1985)
5. Mandie and the Trunk's Secret (1985)
6. Mandie and the Medicine Man (1986)
7. Mandie and the Charleston Phantom (1986)
8. Mandie and the Abandoned Mine (1987)
9. Mandie and the Hidden Treasure (1987)
10. Mandie and the Mysterious Bells (1988)
11. Mandie and the Holiday Surprise (1988)
12. Mandie and the Washington Nightmare (1989)
13. Mandie and the Midnight Journey (1989)
14. Mandie and the Shipboard Mystery (1990)
15. Mandie and the Foreign Spies (1990)
16. Mandie and the Silent Catacombs (1990)
17. Mandie and the Singing Chalet (1991)
18. Mandie and the Jumping Juniper (1991)
19. Mandie and the Mysterious Fisherman (1992)
20. Mandie and the Windmill's Message (1992)
21. Mandie and the Fiery Rescue (1993)
22. Mandie and the Angel's Secret (1993)
23. Mandie and the Dangerous Imposters (1994)
24. Mandie and the Invisible Troublemaker (1994)
25. Mandie and Her Missing Kin (1995)
26. Mandie and the Schoolhouse's Secret (1996)
27. Mandie and the Courtroom Battle (1996)
28. Mandie and Jonathan's Predicament (1997)
29. Mandie and the Unwanted Gift (1997)
30. Mandie and the Long Goodbye (1998)
31. Mandie and the Buried Stranger (1999)
32. Mandie and the Seaside Rendezvous (1999)
33. Mandie and the Dark Alley (2000)
34. Mandie and the Tornado! (2001)
35. Mandie and the Quilt Mystery (2002)
36. Mandie and the New York Secret (2003)
37. Mandie and the Night Thief (2003)
38. Mandie and the Hidden Past (2003)
39. Mandie and the Missing Schoolmarm (2004)
40. Mandie and the Graduation Mystery (2004)

== Other titles ==
Young Mandie series

Set before the Mandie series, starting in 1898 when Mandie is 9.

1. Who's Mandie? (1999)
2. The New Girl (1999)
3. The Mystery at Miss Abigail's (1999)
4. Merry Christmas from Mandie (2000)
5. The Talking Snowman (2001)
6. The Secret in the Woods (2001)
7. The Missing Book (2002)
8. The Haunted Shop (2002)

Mandie: Her College Days
Set after the Mandie series, around 1904. Now 16, Mandie and Celia attend Charleston Ladies' College. For older children or young adults.

- New Horizons (2006)

Special Mandie books

- Mandie's Cookbook (1991)
- Mandie and Joe's Christmas Surprise (1995)
- Mandie: My Datebook (1997)
- Mandie: My Diary (1997)
- Mandie and Mollie & the Angel's Visit (1998)

Mandie movies

1. Mandie and the Secret Tunnel (2009) with Lexi Johnson as Mandie Shaw
2. Mandie and the Cherokee Treasure (2010) with Lexi Johnson as Mandie Shaw
3. Mandie and the Forgotten Christmas (2011) with Kelly Washington as Mandie Shaw

== Characters ==
- Amanda Elizabeth Shaw: Referred to as Mandie by her peers, Mandie enjoys solving mysteries, no matter how mysterious or dangerous the situation may be. She has long blond hair (usually braided), and blue eyes. Mandie is a Christian, who stands up for her beliefs and values. Her favorite verse is "What time I am afraid I will put my trust in Thee." She is quite emotional and gets frustrated when she can't solve a mystery. Mandie longs to grow up throughout the series. When sent to a young ladies school to learn social graces, she finds it ridiculous and remains her own lively self. The death of her biological father affects her deeply, leading her to her Uncle John's resulting in the truth as to her biological mother with whom she is reunited. She becomes very attached to her mother who married her Uncle John.
- Joe Woodard: Joe is Mandie's best friend and the only friend who knew her father before he died. He has "unruly brown hair", brown eyes, and long legs. Because Joe stays in Swain County when Mandie moves away, he promises to care for her father's grave. Joe has a crush on Mandie, and towards the end of the series he tells Mandie he loves her. He intends on marrying Mandie when he gets her father's property back from Mandie's stepmother, Etta. That is the main reason he intends to be a lawyer when he grows up. Joe also helps Mandie on solving mysteries, but says that she does most of the work.
- Polly Cornwallis: Mandie's wealthy next door neighbor and the first best friend whom she makes after arriving at her Uncle John's house. She is about the same age as Mandie and helps her solve mysteries. Polly is very timid and does not like to breach etiquette. Mandie and Joe keep Polly moving when it is possible, but she is very stubborn. Her avid interest in Joe Woodard leaves a constant strain on her friendship with Mandie. Later on in the series, she goes to the same school as Mandie, and tries to help her fit in with the other girls at Miss Heathwood's boarding school.
- Celia Hamilton: Celia is one of Mandie's best friends throughout the Mandie series. Mandie meets Celia in book #4 Mandie and the Forbidden Attic. Celia goes to the same school as Mandie (Miss Heathwood's School) and she helps Mandie solve mysteries. They met when Mandie heard her crying in her room one night. Celia had lost her father shortly before coming to school. They immediately bonded and asked to share a room together since Celia was alone in a private room and Mandie was stuck in a full room. Celia has thick auburn hair, fair skin and green eyes and is much quieter than Mandie. She has a crush on Robert, who she met at a school tea.
- Etta Shaw: Etta married Mandie's father, Jim Shaw, but is not truly her mother. She has a daughter named Irene Shaw, and she seems to love her a lot more than Mandie.
- Jim Shaw: Mandie's father. Jim dies before the beginning of the first book, which begins with his funeral. He is said to have had red hair and blue eyes, and to be very fun loving and always looked out for Mandie.
- Uncle John: John Shaw, Jim's older brother and Mandie's uncle and stepfather. He married Elizabeth, Mandie's real mother, after Jim died. It is said that Uncle John resembles Jim, Mandie's father greatly. He is very wealthy. He has a weakness for blue eyes, like the ones Mandie and her mother have.
- Uncle Ned: Ned Sweetwater was Jim's best friend. Ned is a Cherokee Native American. He promised Mandie's father that he would keep Mandie safe. Uncle Ned follows Mandie around and helps get her out of trouble her many adventures. Ned is Mandie's honorary uncle. Uncle Ned affectionately calls Mandie his Papoose.
- Mary Elizabeth Taft: Mandie's rich grandmother, who separated her parents, and seems to have changed drastically from a fussy old lady to a kind, thoughtful grandmother from the first book to the rest of the series.
- Tommy Patton: Mandie's friend who attends Mr. Chadwick's School for boys in Asheville. He lives in Charleston, but makes no secret of his affections for Mandie, and always asks her to accompany him to social events between their schools. Joe is very jealous of Tommy.
- Jonathan Lindall Guyer III: Mandie and Celia's friend, whom they meet when he runs away from home and stows away on the boat taking them to Europe. He ends up touring Europe with them, and loves adventures almost as much as Mandie does. He shows some signs of affection towards Mandie, and appears to be jealous of her friend Joe Woodard. He also loves to tease her.
- Snowball: Mandie's white cat who she's fond of. He follows Mandie everywhere and has helped her out of many situations.
- Dimar Walkingstick: Mandie's Native American friend who she meets when she discovers Cherokee Gold. He is shown to have a crush on Mandie.
- Tsa'ni Pindar: Mandie's troublesome Cherokee cousin. He shows some affection for Sallie.
- Sallie Sweetwater: Another one of Mandie's Indian friends. Sallie is Uncle Ned's granddaughter. She is shown to have a crush on Dimar.
- Elizabeth Taft Shaw: Mandie's biological mother, who married her uncle. She is over-protective of Mandie because she doesn't want to lose her again, and has blonde hair and blue eyes.
- Miss Heathwood: The stern but fair headmistress and teacher of Mandie and Celia's boarding school.
- Miss Hope: The headmistress assistant who is very sweet to Mandie and Celia. She marries Mr. Chadwick (in book 39) who is the headmaster at Mr. Chadwick's school for boys.
