= Lois Gladys Leppard =

American children's novel author

Lois Gladys Leppard (1924 – October 5, 2008) was the author of the Mandie series of children's novels. Leppard wrote her first Mandie story when she was only eleven and a half years old, but did not become a professional author until she was an adult. Leppard has also worked as a professional singer, actress, and playwright. At one time, she and her two sisters, Sybil and Louise, formed a singing group called the Larke Sisters.

There are forty Mandie books in the main series, an eight-book junior series and several other titles. Leppard said that she could write a Mandie book in two weeks, barring any interruptions.

The eponymous heroine lives in North Carolina in the early 1900s, encountering adventure and solving mysteries with help from her friends, family, and pet cat, Snowball. These young reader novels are meant to teach morals as well as be fun and captivating stories to read. Leppard stated that her books contain "nothing occult or vulgar", and Mandie is depicted as a faithful Christian. The Mandie books often deal with issues of discrimination and prejudice relating to race (particularly with regard to the local Cherokee), class, and disability.

Lois Gladys Leppard based some of the incidents in her Mandie books on her mother's experiences growing up in North Carolina. The dedication in the first book is: "For My Mother, Bessie A. Wilson Leppard, and In Memory of Her Sister, Lillie Margaret Ann Wilson Frady, Orphans of North Carolina Who Outgrew the Sufferings of Childhood".

== Books ==
The Mandie Series

The Lily Adventures

1. Secret Money (1995)
2. Suspicious Identity (1995)

== Film ==
A straight to DVD movie based on some of the books in the Mandie series was released on September 22, 2009. The first movie, titled after the first book of the series, Mandie and the Secret Tunnel, has a cast that includes Lexi Johnson (as Mandie), Dean Jones, and William Yelton. The rights to produce a film based on Mandie and the Secret Tunnel are currently owned by Kalon Media. Two further films have been produced.
