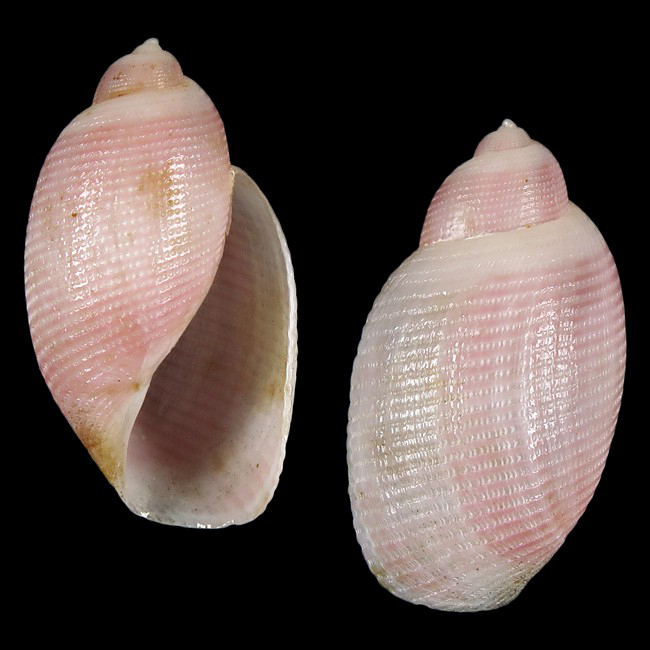

Scientific classification
- Kingdom: Animalia
- Phylum: Mollusca
- Class: Gastropoda
- Family: Aplustridae
- Genus: Rictaxiella
- Species: R. joyae

Binomial name
- Rictaxiella joyae Poppe, Tagaro & Chino, 2011

= Rictaxiella joyae =

Species of sea snail

Rictaxiella joyae is a species of sea snail, a marine gastropod mollusk in the family Aplustridae.

== Original description ==
- Poppe G.T., Tagaro S.P. & Chino M. (2011) Two new Rictaxiella (Gastropoda: Bullinidae) from the Philippines. Visaya 3(3): 76-82. [August 2011]

page(s): 77.
