= Aplustrum =

Scientific classification
- Kingdom: Animalia
- Phylum: Mollusca
- Class: Gastropoda
- Family: Aplustridae
- Genus: Aplustrum; Schumacher, 1817

Type species
- Aplustrum fasciatum Schumacher, 1817

Synonyms
- Amplustrum Gray, 1847 (Incorrect subsequent spelling of Aplustrum); Bulla (Aplustrum) Schumacher, 1817

Genus of molluscs

Aplustrum is a genus of gastropods belonging to the family Aplustridae.

== Distribution ==
The species of this genus are found in Indian and Pacific Ocean.

Species:

- Aplustrum virgatum Mörch, 1852 (nomen dubium)

Species brought into synonymy

- Aplustrum amplustre (Linnaeus, 1758): synonym of Hydatina amplustre (Linnaeus, 1758)
- Aplustrum fasciatum Schumacher, 1817: synonym of Aplustrum amplustre (Linnaeus, 1758): synonym of Hydatina amplustre (Linnaeus, 1758)
- Aplustrum thalassiarchi (A. Adams, 1855): synonym of Hydatina amplustre (Linnaeus, 1758)
