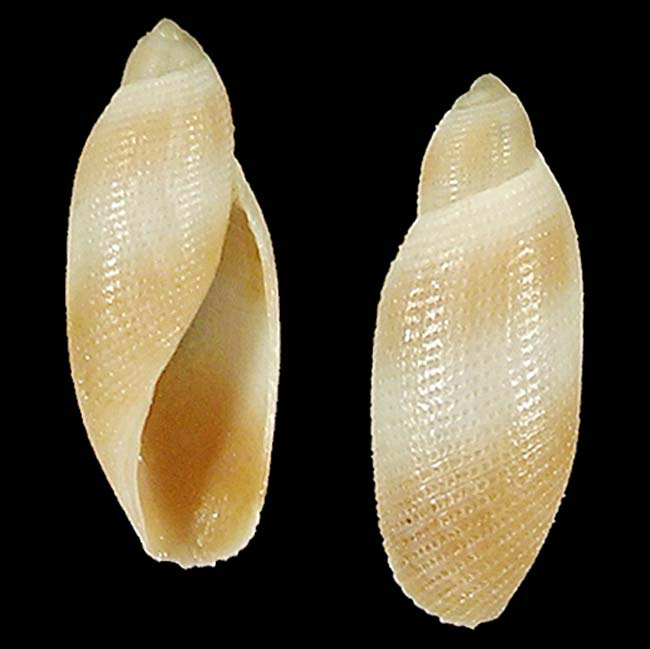

Scientific classification
- Kingdom: Animalia
- Phylum: Mollusca
- Class: Gastropoda
- Family: Aplustridae
- Genus: Rictaxiella
- Species: R. debelius

Binomial name
- Rictaxiella debelius Poppe, Tagaro & Chino, 2011

= Rictaxiella debelius =

Species of gastropod

Rictaxiella debelius is a species of sea snail, a marine gastropod mollusk in the family Aplustridae.

== Original description ==
- Poppe G.T., Tagaro S.P. & Chino M. (2011) Two new Rictaxiella (Gastropoda: Bullinidae) from the Philippines. Visaya 3(3): 76–82. [August 2011] page(s): 76.
