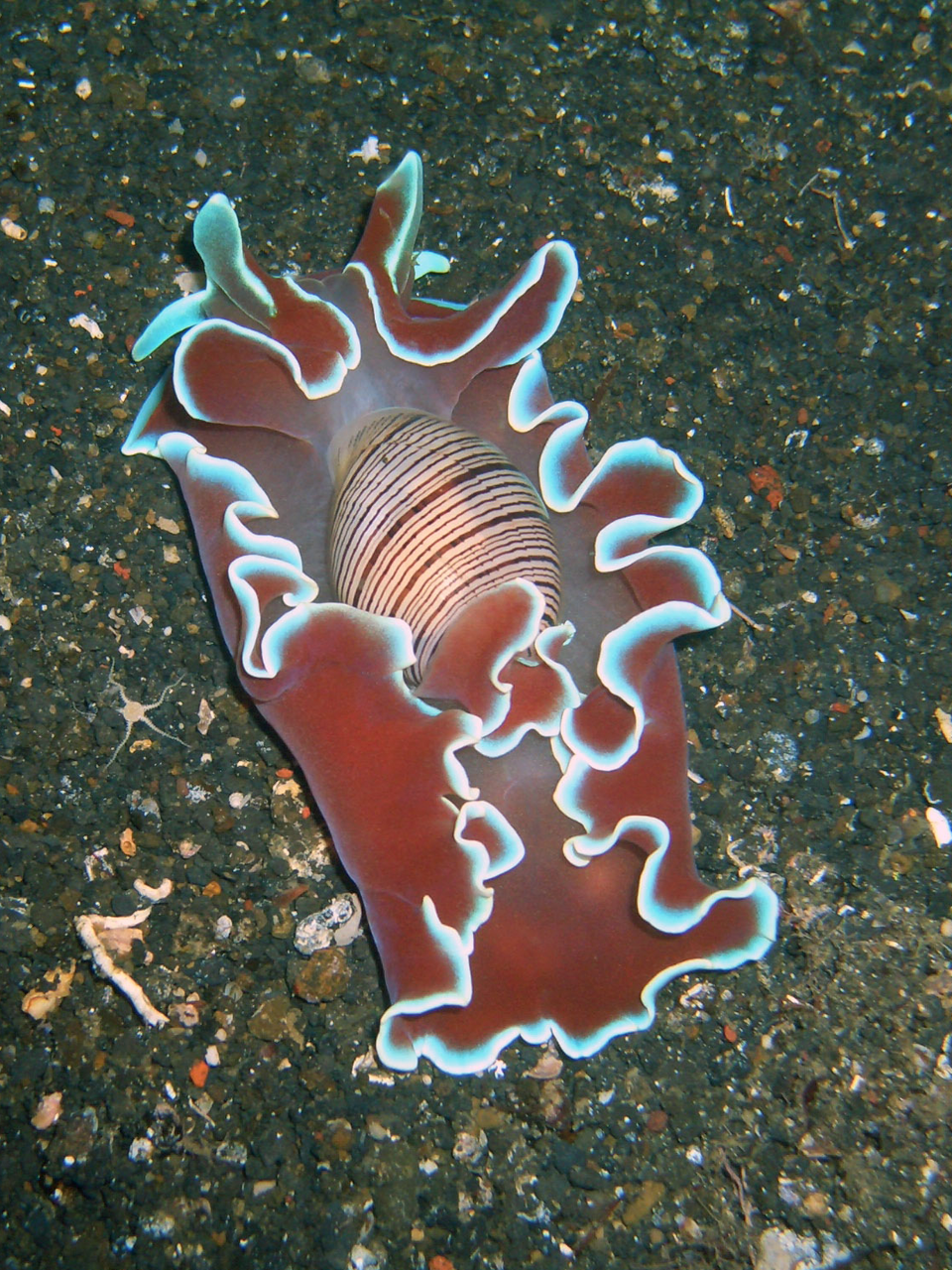
- Live individual of Hydatina physis, head end towards the top of the image

Scientific classification
- Kingdom: Animalia
- Phylum: Mollusca
- Class: Gastropoda
- Family: Aplustridae
- Genus: Hydatina; Schumacher, 1817

Species
- See text

Synonyms
- Bulla (Hydatina) Schumacher, 1817; Hydatoria Iredale, 1936

= Hydatina =

Genus of gastropods

Hydatina is a genus of sea snails, bubble snails, marine opisthobranch gastropod mollusks in the family Aplustridae.

== Species ==
Species within this genus include:

- Hydatina albocincta Van der Hoeven, 1839
- Hydatina amplustre Linnaeus, 1758
- † Hydatina crebristriata (H. Woodward, 1879)
- Hydatina exquisita Voskuil, 1995
  - Distribution: Marquesas Islands
  - Length: 21 mm
  - Description: very globose, thin shell with black and purplish spiral bands on body whorl and a narrow white band below the suture and at anterior end: anterior end of the columella is directed slightly to the right.
- Hydatina fasciata (Bruguière, 1792)
- Hydatina montilai Delsaerdt, 1996
  - Distribution: Philippines.
- Hydatina physis (Linnaeus, 1758)
- Hydatina vesicaria (Lightfoot, 1786) brown-lined paper bubble
  - Distribution: Florida, Mexico, Caribbean.
  - Length: 17–45 mm
  - Description: lives on the bottom at the depth of 8 m to 64 m; very fragile and delicate shell with fine brown spiral lines
- Hydatina zonata Solander in Lightfoot, 1786 zoned paper bubble

== Synonyms ==
- Hydatina aplustre [sic]: synonym of Aplustrum amplustre (Linnaeus, 1758) represented as Hydatina amplustre (Linnaeus, 1758) (misspelling)
- Hydatina cinctoria Perry, 1811 (color variant and synonym of Hydatina zonata).
  - Distribution: South Africa
- Hydatina circulata (Martyn, 1789) : synonym of Hydatina zonata ([Lightfoot], 1786) (non-binominal)
- Hydatina exigua Hedley, 1912: synonym of Noalda exigua (Hedley, 1912)
- Hydatina eximia (Deshayes, 1863): synonym of Micromelo scriptus (Garrett, 1857)
- Hydatina filosa Schumacher, 1817: synonym of Hydatina physis (Linnaeus, 1758) (junior subjective synonym)
- Hydatina inflata Dunker, 1877: synonym of Hydatina zonata ([Lightfoot], 1786) (junior synonym)
- Hydatina stroemfeldi [sic] synonym of Hydatina vesicaria ([Lightfoot], 1786) (misspelling - incorrect subsequent spelling)
- Hydatina stromfelti Odhner, 1932: synonym of Hydatina vesicaria ([Lightfoot], 1786) (junior subjective synonym)
- Hydatina velum Gmelin, 1791 (probably color variant and synonym of Hydatina zonata)
  - Distribution: Indian Ocean, East Africa
  - Length: 25–50 mm

== Gallery ==
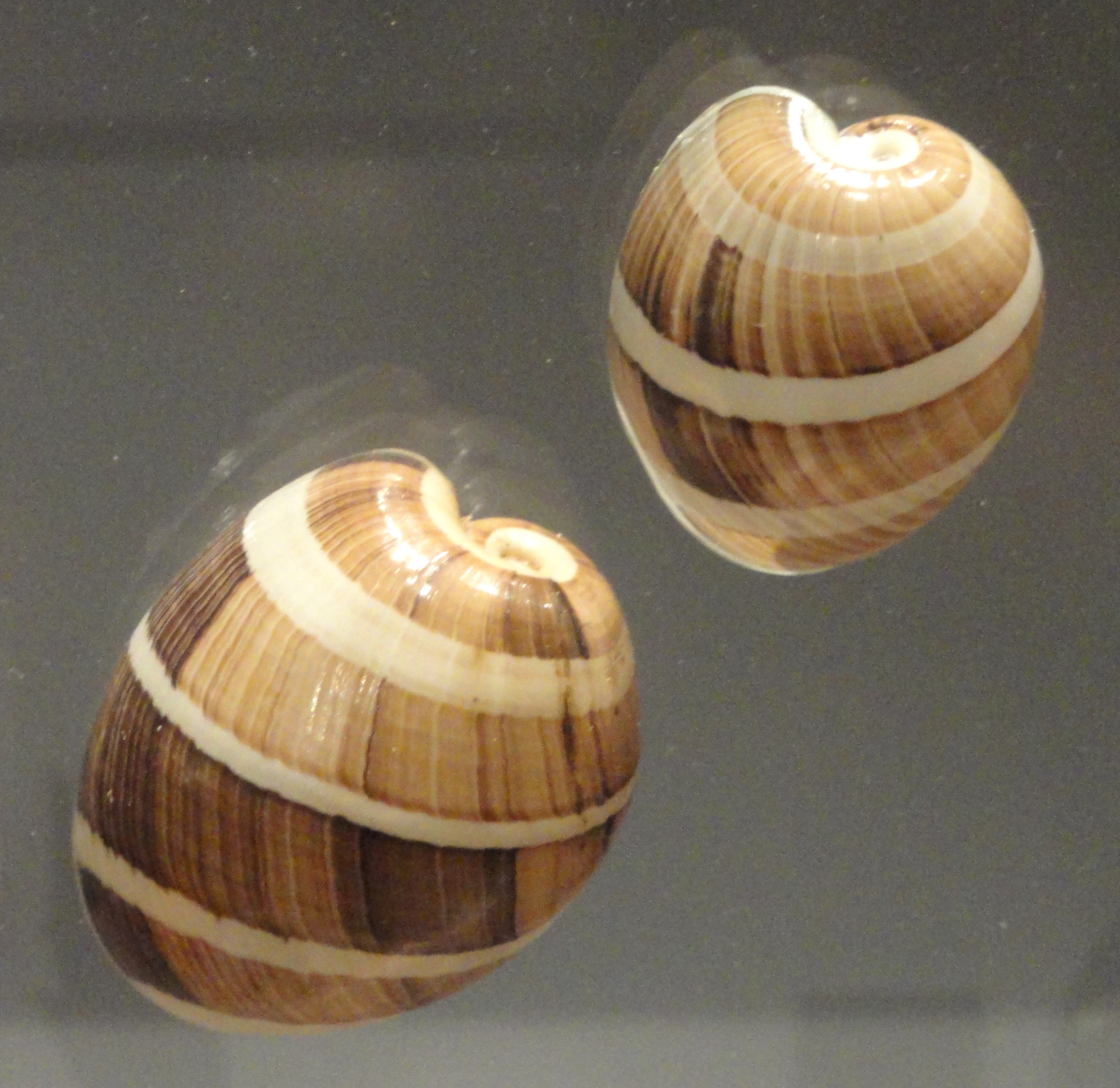
Hydatina albocincta

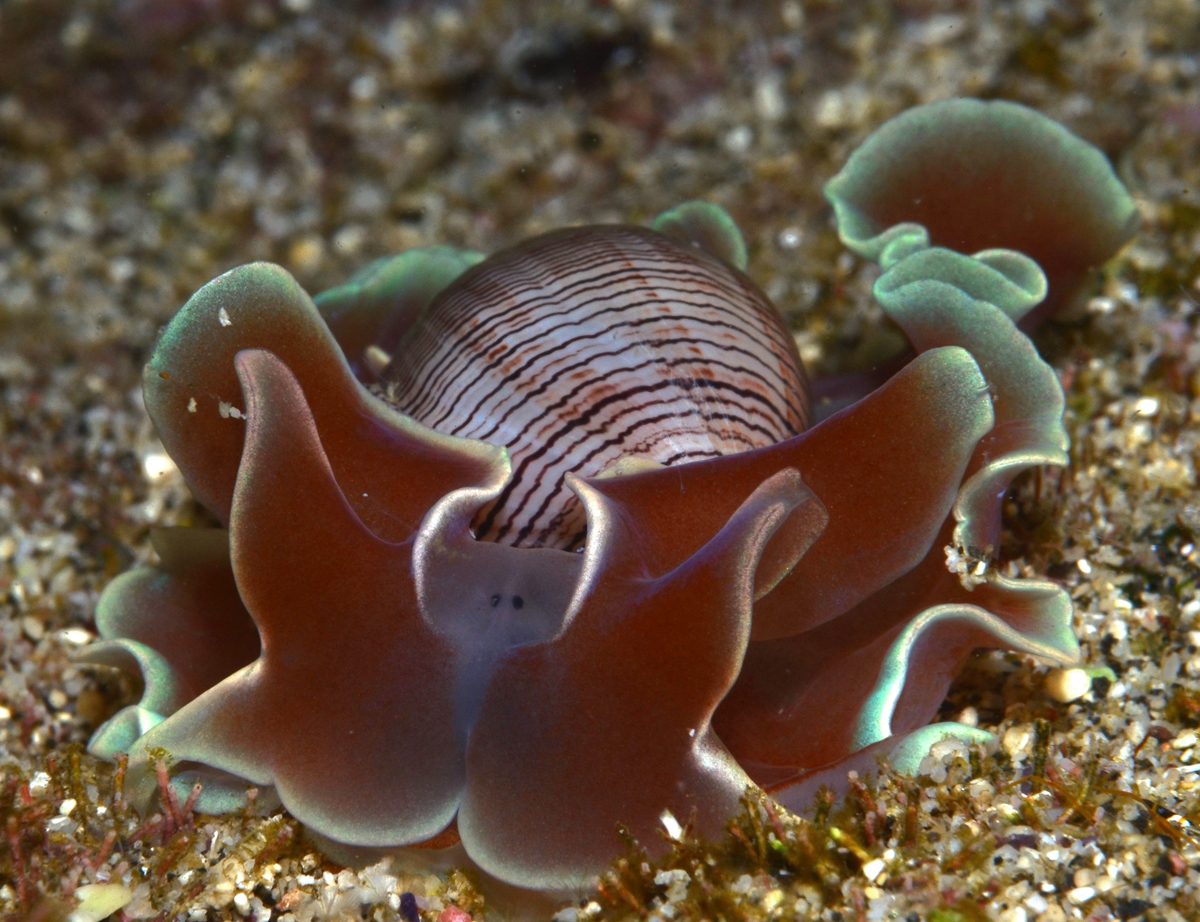
Hydatina physis

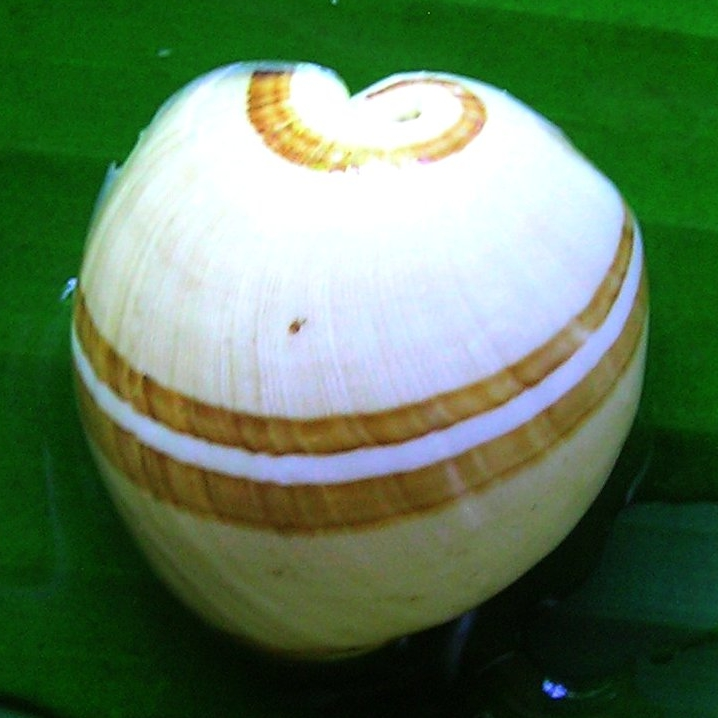
Hydatina zonata
