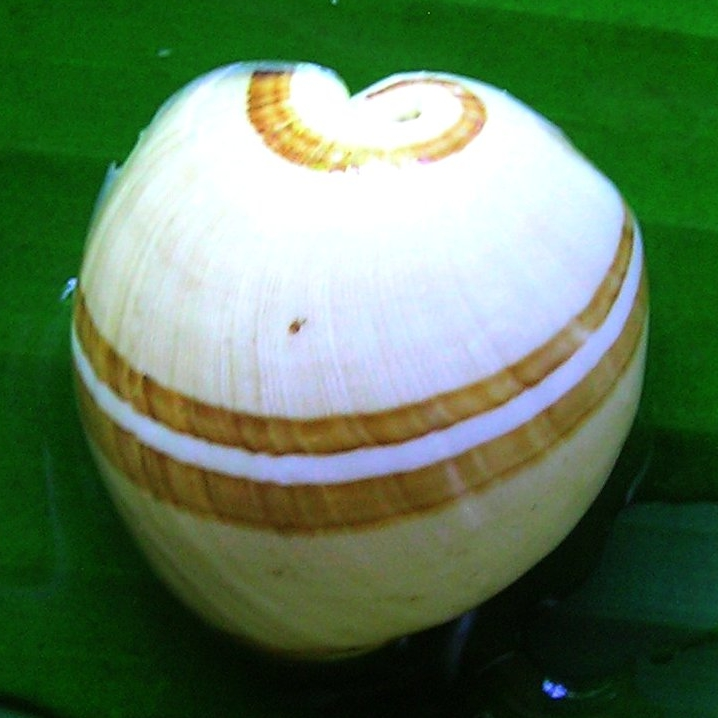
- A shell of Hydatina zonata

Scientific classification
- Kingdom: Animalia
- Phylum: Mollusca
- Class: Gastropoda
- Family: Aplustridae
- Genus: Hydatina
- Species: H. zonata

Binomial name
- Hydatina zonata Solander in Lightfoot, 1786

= Hydatina zonata =

Zoned paper bubble

Species of gastropod

Hydatina zonata, common name the zoned paper bubble, is a species of sea snail or bubble snail, a marine gastropod mollusc in the family Aplustridae.

== Distribution ==
This species occurs in the Indo-Pacific.

== Description ==
The shell has the same shape as Hydatina physis. It is characterised by thin thick irregular brown lines running across the translucent white shell, essentially parallel to the outer lip of the shell. There are colorless spiral bands around the base and apex of the shell. The color of the soft parts of the animal varies from a pale translucent, almost white form, to a dark pinkish brown form that is edged with white.

Length: 40 mm.
