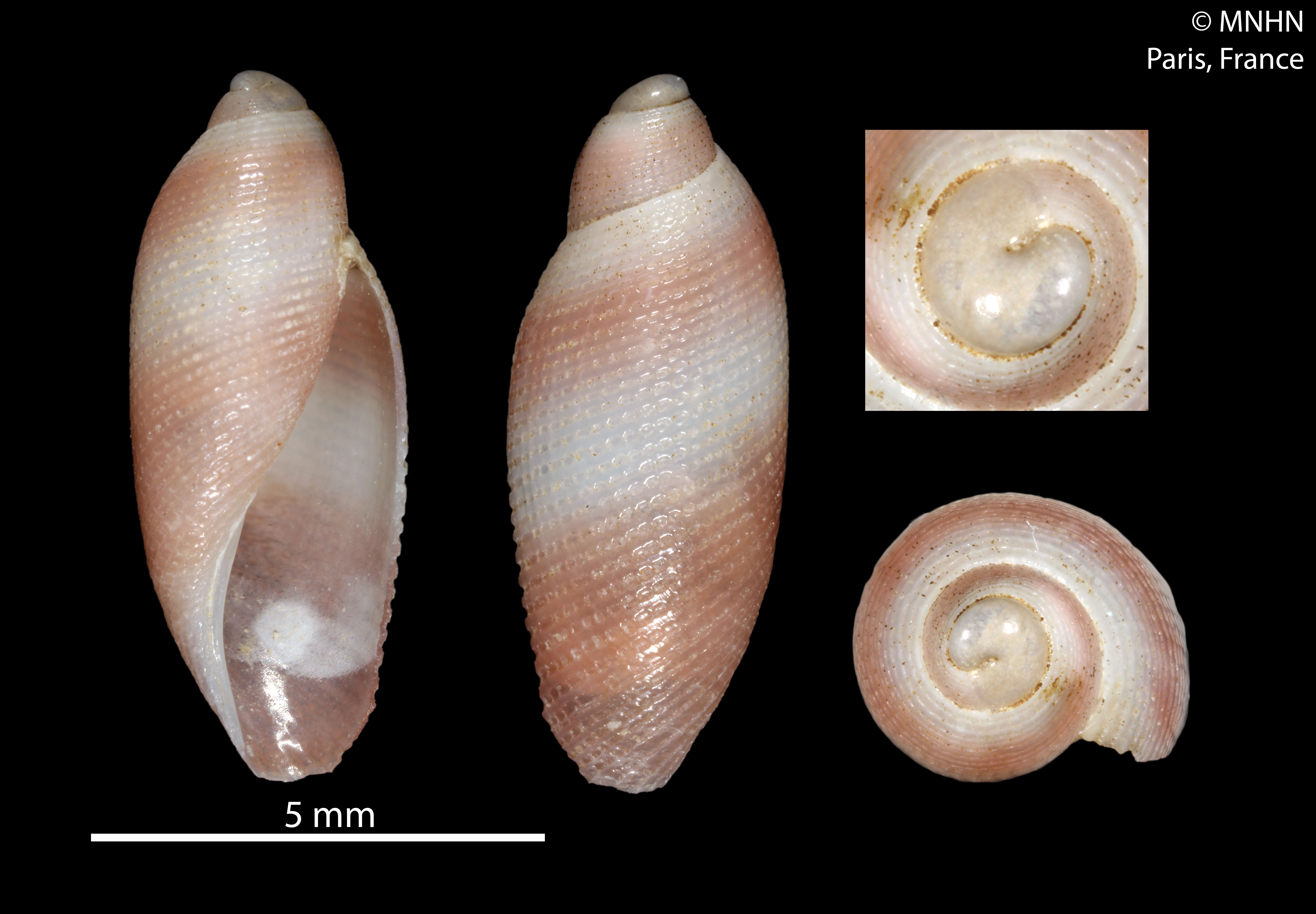
- Shell of Rictaxiella debelius

Scientific classification
- Kingdom: Animalia
- Phylum: Mollusca
- Class: Gastropoda
- Subterclass: Acteonimorpha
- Superfamily: Acteonoidea
- Family: Aplustridae
- Genus: Rictaxiella; Habe, 1958

Type species
- Rictaxiella choshiensis Habe, 1958

Synonyms
- Pupa (Rictaxiella) Habe, 1958

= Rictaxiella =

Genus of gastropods

Rictaxiella is a genus of sea snails, bubble snails, marine opisthobranch gastropod mollusks in the family Aplustridae.

== Species ==
- Rictaxiella choshiensis Habe, 1958
- Rictaxiella debelius Poppe, Tagaro & Chino, 2011
- Rictaxiella joyae Poppe, Tagaro & Chino, 2011
