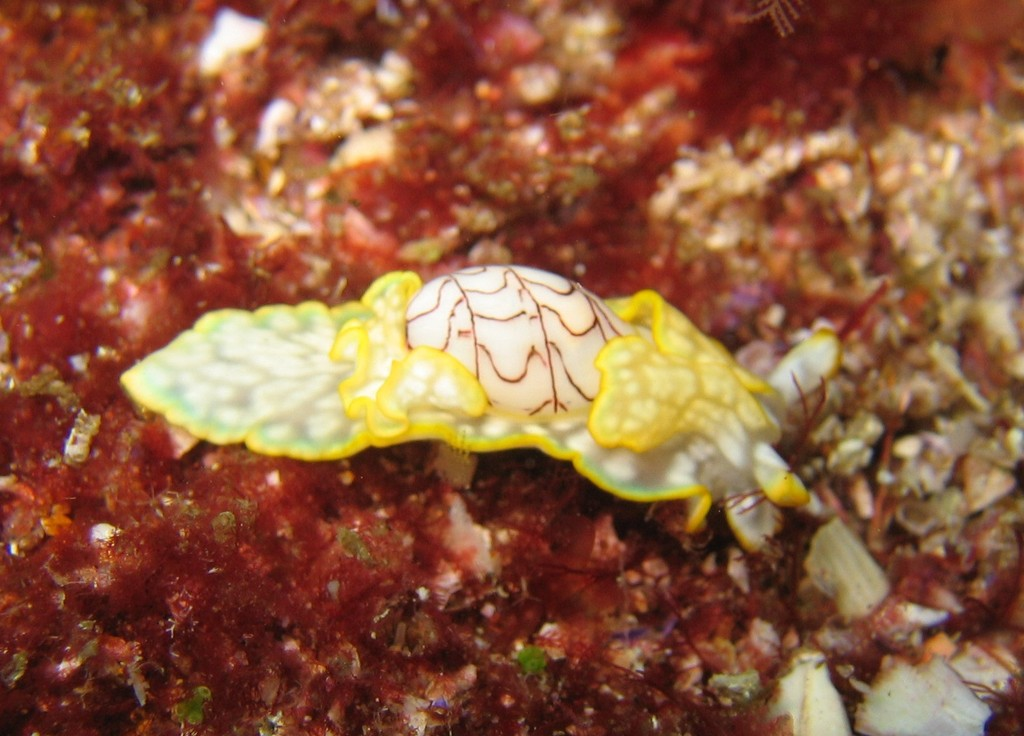
- Live individual of Micromelo guamensis, head end towards the right

Scientific classification
- Kingdom: Animalia
- Phylum: Mollusca
- Class: Gastropoda
- Family: Aplustridae
- Genus: Micromelo
- Species: M. guamensis

Binomial name
- Micromelo guamensis Quoy & Gaimard, 1825

= Micromelo guamensis =

Species of gastropod

Micromelo guamensis, common name the Guam paper bubble, is a species of sea snail, a bubble snail, a marine opisthobranch gastropod mollusc in the family Aplustridae.

== Description ==
This species has a white shell with black to brownish wavy longitudinal bands. It may in fact be the same species as Micromelo undatus, but it has traditionally been considered to be an Indo-West Pacific species. The shell is too small to hold the whole body, which has a green mantle with white spots and yellowish margins. The length is 10 to 12 mm.

== Habitat ==
This species is found in shallow water, crawling on algae-covered rocks.

== Distribution ==
This species occurs in South Africa, Japan, and the west coast of Australia.
