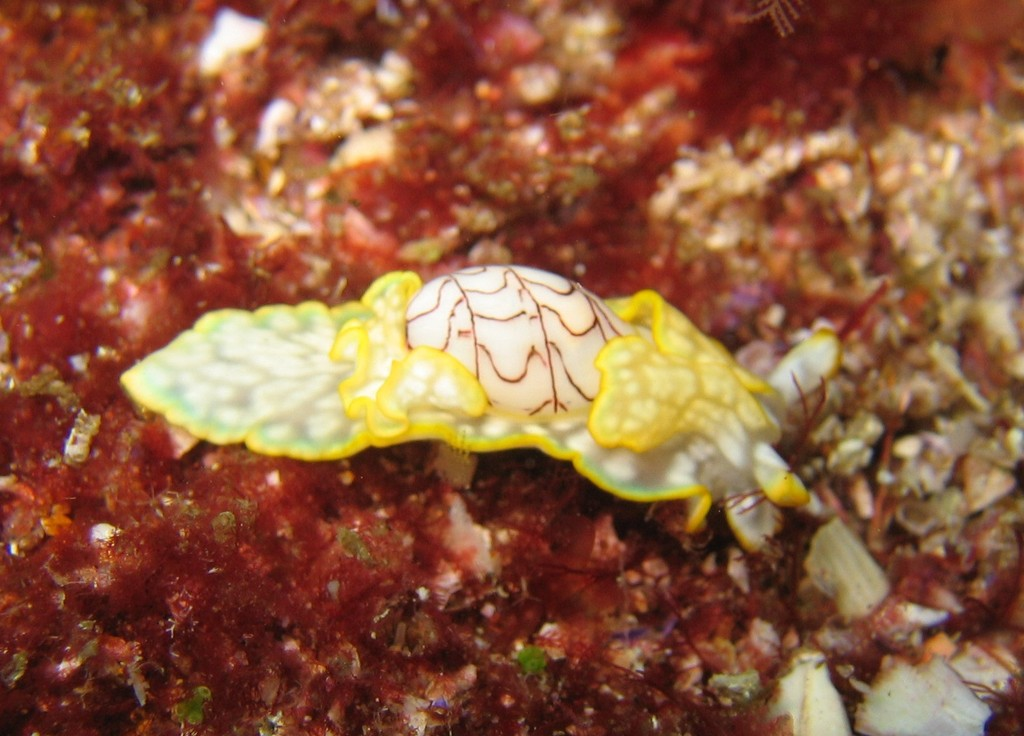
- Live individual of Micromelo guamensis, head end towards the right

Scientific classification
- Kingdom: Animalia
- Phylum: Mollusca
- Class: Gastropoda
- Family: Aplustridae
- Genus: Micromelo; Pilsbry, 1895

Type species
- Bulla undata Bruguière, 1792

= Micromelo =

Genus of gastropods

Micromelo is a genus of sea snails, bubble snails, marine opisthobranch gastropod mollusks in the family Aplustridae.

== Species ==
Species within the genus Micromelo include:

- Micromelo guamensis (Quoy & Gaimard, 1825)
- Micromelo undatus (Bruguière, 1792)

Species brought into synonymy

- Micromelo eximia (Deshayes, 1863): synonym of Micromelo guamensis (Quoy & Gaimard, 1825)
- Micromelo undata [sic]: synonym of Micromelo undatus (Bruguière, 1792) (incorrect gender ending)
