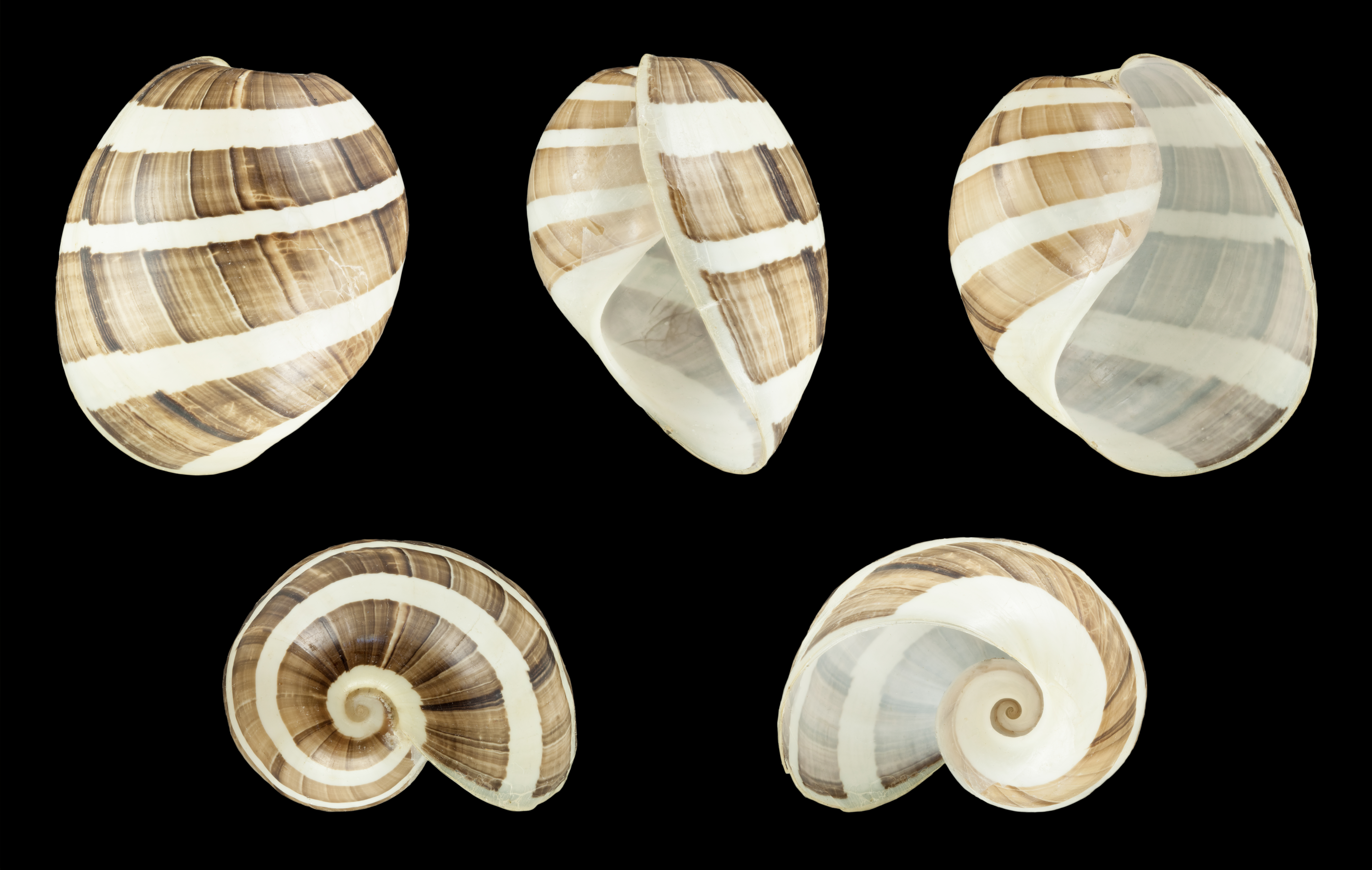

Scientific classification
- Kingdom: Animalia
- Phylum: Mollusca
- Class: Gastropoda
- Family: Aplustridae
- Genus: Hydatina
- Species: H. albocincta

Binomial name
- Hydatina albocincta (Van der Hoeven, 1839)

Synonyms
- Bulla albocincta Van der Hoeven, 1839

= Hydatina albocincta =

White-banded bubble

Species of gastropod

Hydatina albocincta, common name the white-banded bubble, is a species of sea snail or bubble snail, a marine opisthobranch gastropod mollusk in the family Aplustridae.
