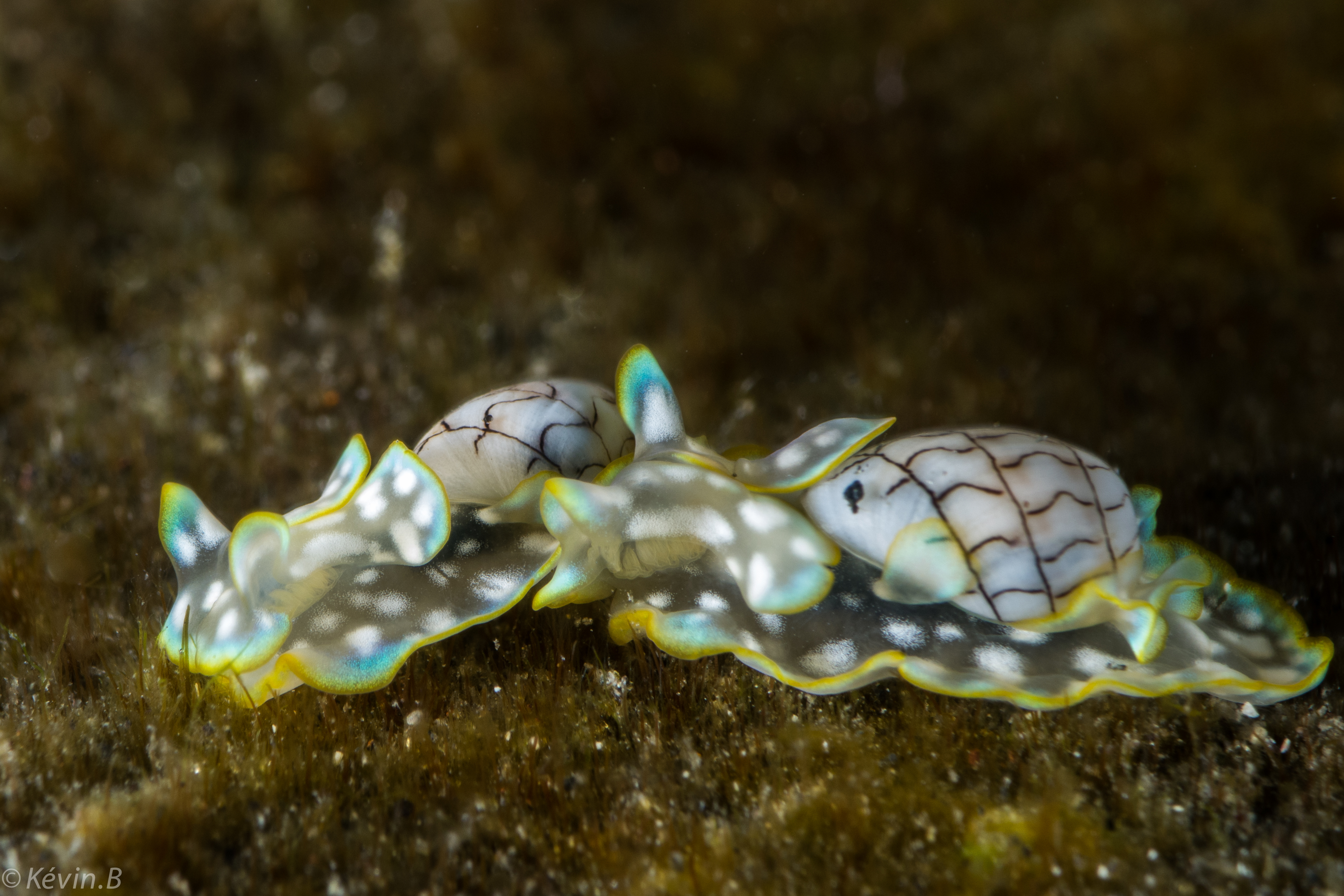
- Live couple of Micromelo undatus

Scientific classification
- Kingdom: Animalia
- Phylum: Mollusca
- Class: Gastropoda
- Superfamily: Acteonoidea
- Family: Aplustridae; Gray, 1847

Genera
- See text.

Synonyms
- Aplustrinae J. E. Gray, 1847 superseded rank; Bullinidae Gray, 1850; Hydatinidae Pilsbry, 1895 (inv.); † Nonacteoninidae Bandel, 1994; † Sulcoactaeonidae Gründel, 1997

= Aplustridae =

Family of gastropods

The Aplustridae is a taxonomic family of sea snails or bubble snails, marine gastropod mollusks in the superfamily Acteonoidea.

The former name of this family, Hydatinidae (Pilsbry, 1893) has been declared invalid.

== Description ==
The soft parts of animals in this family are brightly colored.

The oval bubble-shaped shell is thin and fragile and has a sunken spire. The shell is white or beige-colored with colored bands or stripes.

There is no operculum.

== Life habits ==
The soft parts of the animal cannot retract completely into the shell, and therefore these animals depend for their defense on swimming and camouflage. They are specialised feeders, eating cirratulinid polychaete worms.

== Genera ==
Genera within the family Aplustridae include:

- Aplustrum Schumacher, 1817
- Bullina A. Férussac, 1822
- Espinosina Ortea & Moro, 2017
- Hydatina Schumacher, 1817
- Micromelo Pilsbry, 1895
- Rictaxiella Habe, 1958
- † Sulcoactaeon Cossmann, 1895
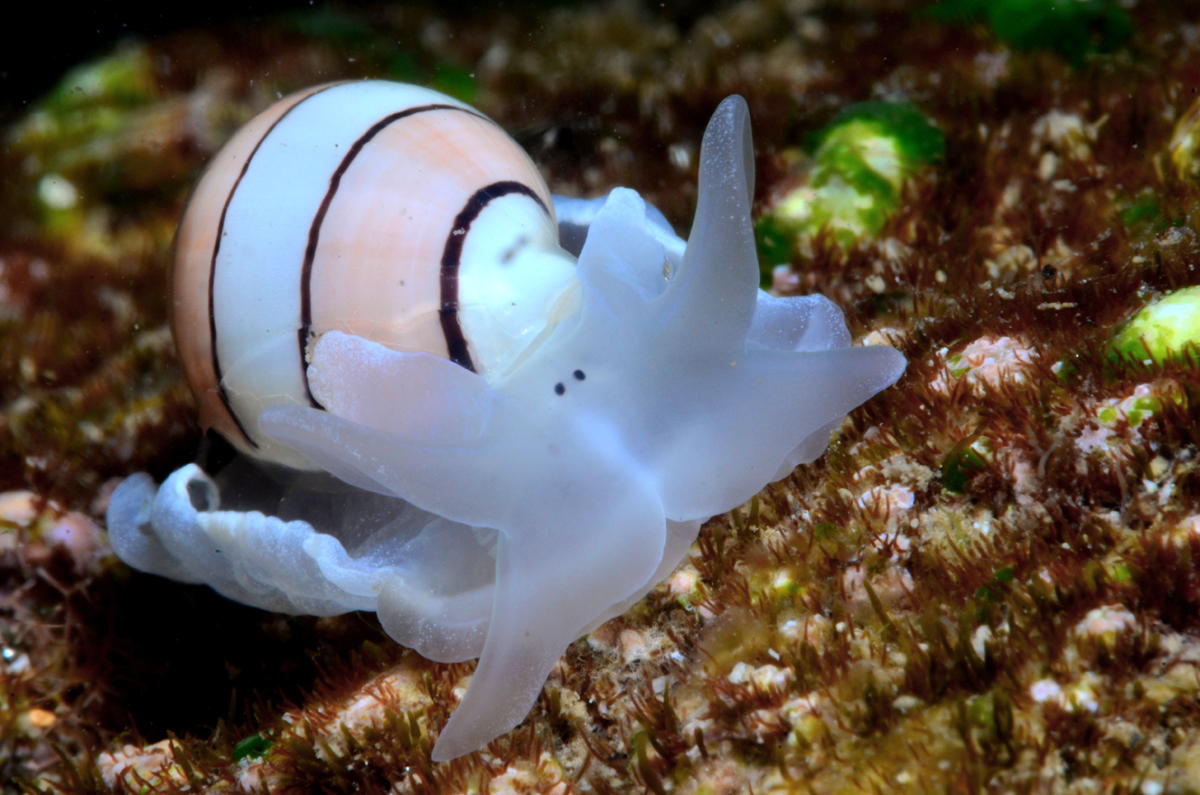
Hydatina amplustre

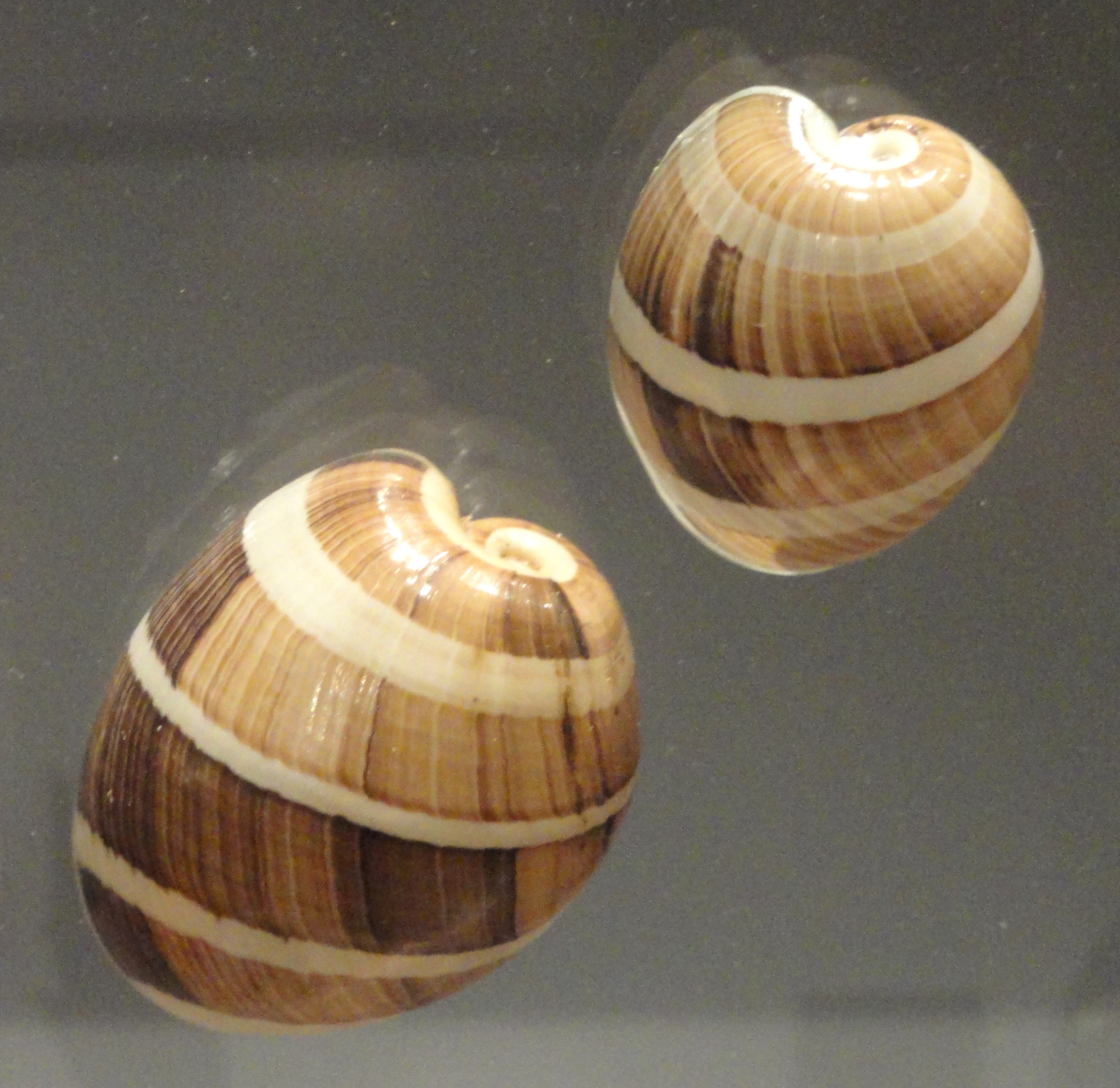
Hydatina albocincta

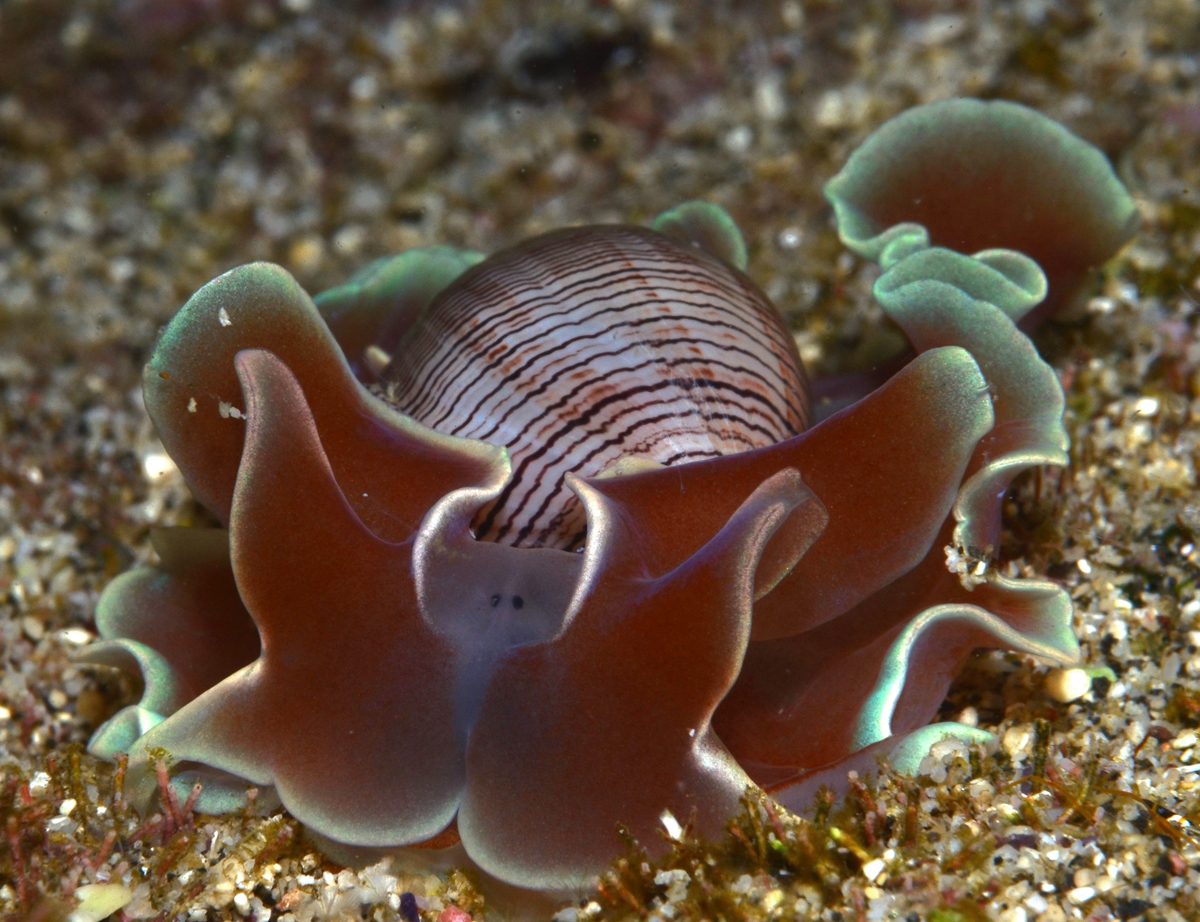
Hydatina physis

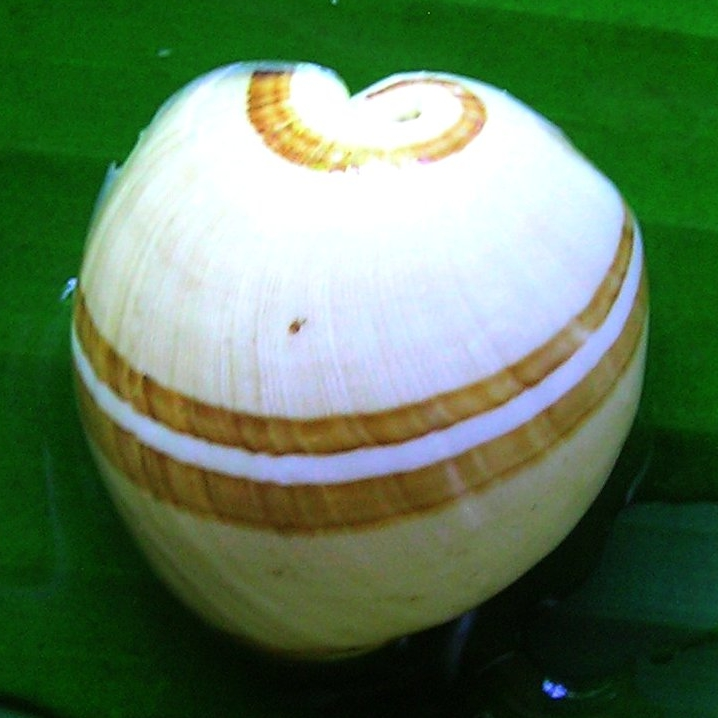
Hydatina zonata

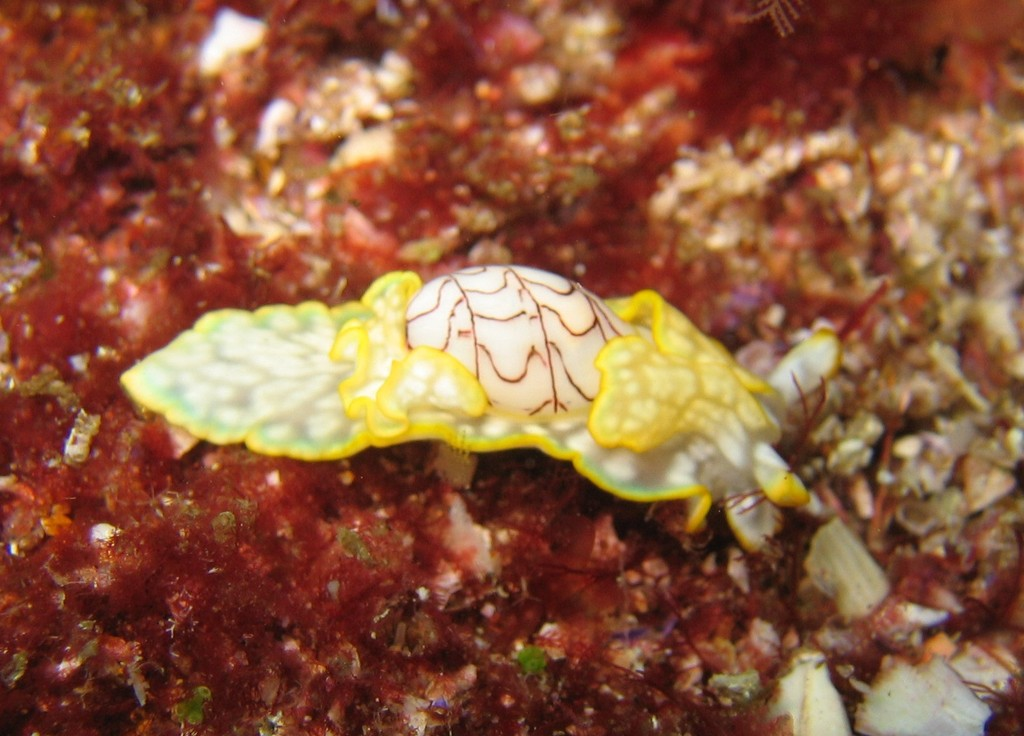
Micromelo guamensis

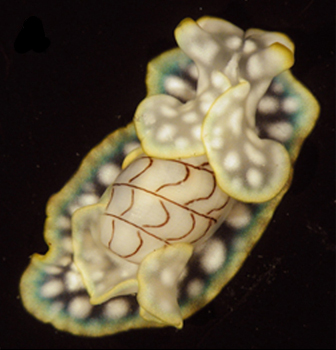
Micromelo undatus
