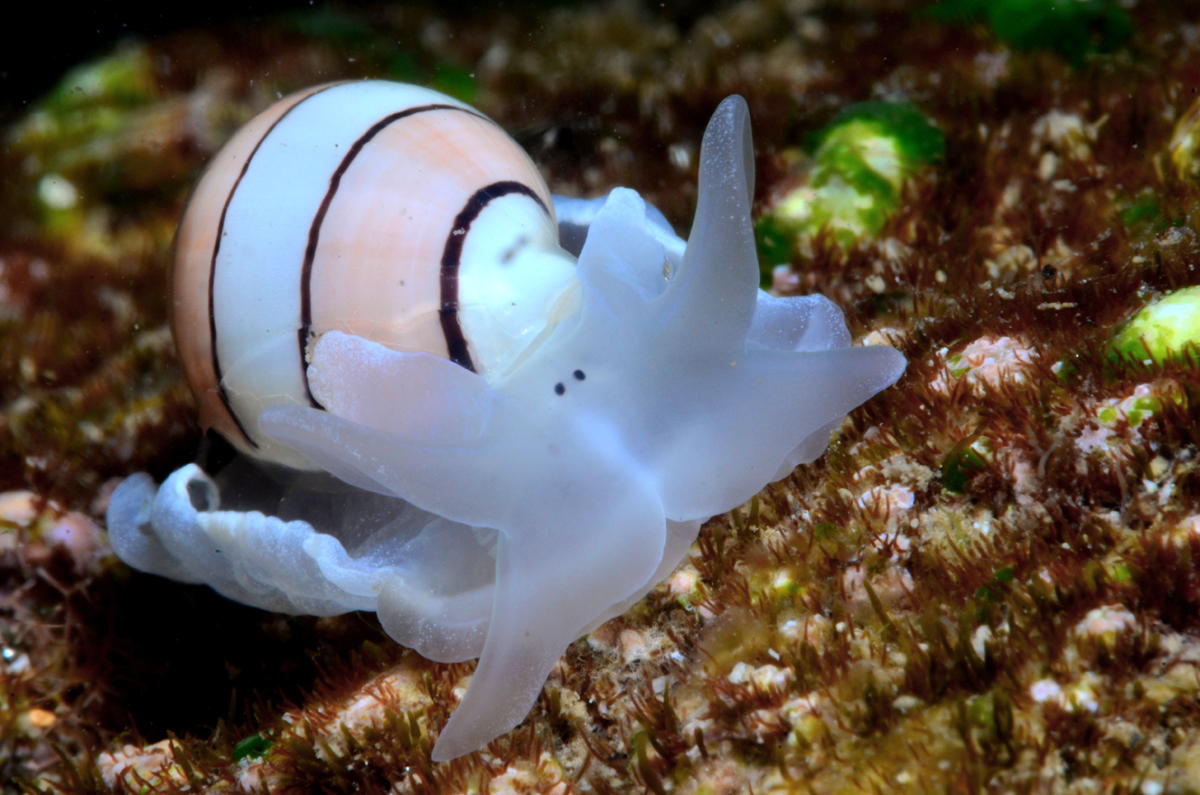

Scientific classification
- Kingdom: Animalia
- Phylum: Mollusca
- Class: Gastropoda
- Family: Aplustridae
- Genus: Hydatina
- Species: H. amplustre

Binomial name
- Hydatina amplustre (Linnaeus, 1758)

Synonyms
- Amplustrum amplustre (Linnaeus, 1758); Amplustrum fasciatum (Schumacher, 1817); Aplustrum amplustre (Linnaeus, 1758) alternative representation; Aplustrum fasciatum Schumacher, 1817; Aplustrum thalassiarchi (A. Adams, 1855); Bulla (Aplustrum) thalassiarchi A. Adams, 1850 junior subjective synonym; Bulla amplustre Linnaeus, 1758; Bulla pulchella Swainson, 1840; Bulla thalassiarchi A. Adams, 1855; Hydatina amplustre (Linnaeus, 1758); Hydatina aplustre [sic](typo)

= Hydatina amplustre =

Species of gastropod

Hydatina amplustre, also known as royal paper bubble, ship’s flag shell, swollen bubble, is a species of sea snails, bubble snails, marine opisthobranch gastropod mollusks in the family Aplustridae.

== Description ==
With length of shell around 15–40 mm, its shell is smaller and more heavily calcified shell than the other members of same species. shell with horizontal lines, with lightbrown stripes, outlined in black, alternating with translucent white and pink stripes patterns; the animal is too large to fit inside its shell. The species is active at night. Predator feeding on polychaete worms. Empty shells are used by hermit crabs.

== Distribution ==
The species is distributed in warm sea around tropical Indo-Pacific: Australia, New Zealand, South of Kyūshū of Japan, South Africa to Hawaii, Madagascar, Philippines.

== Habitat ==
It lives in shallow water (10 metres below sea level) on reefs, with a mix of fine sand, rock and turf algae.
