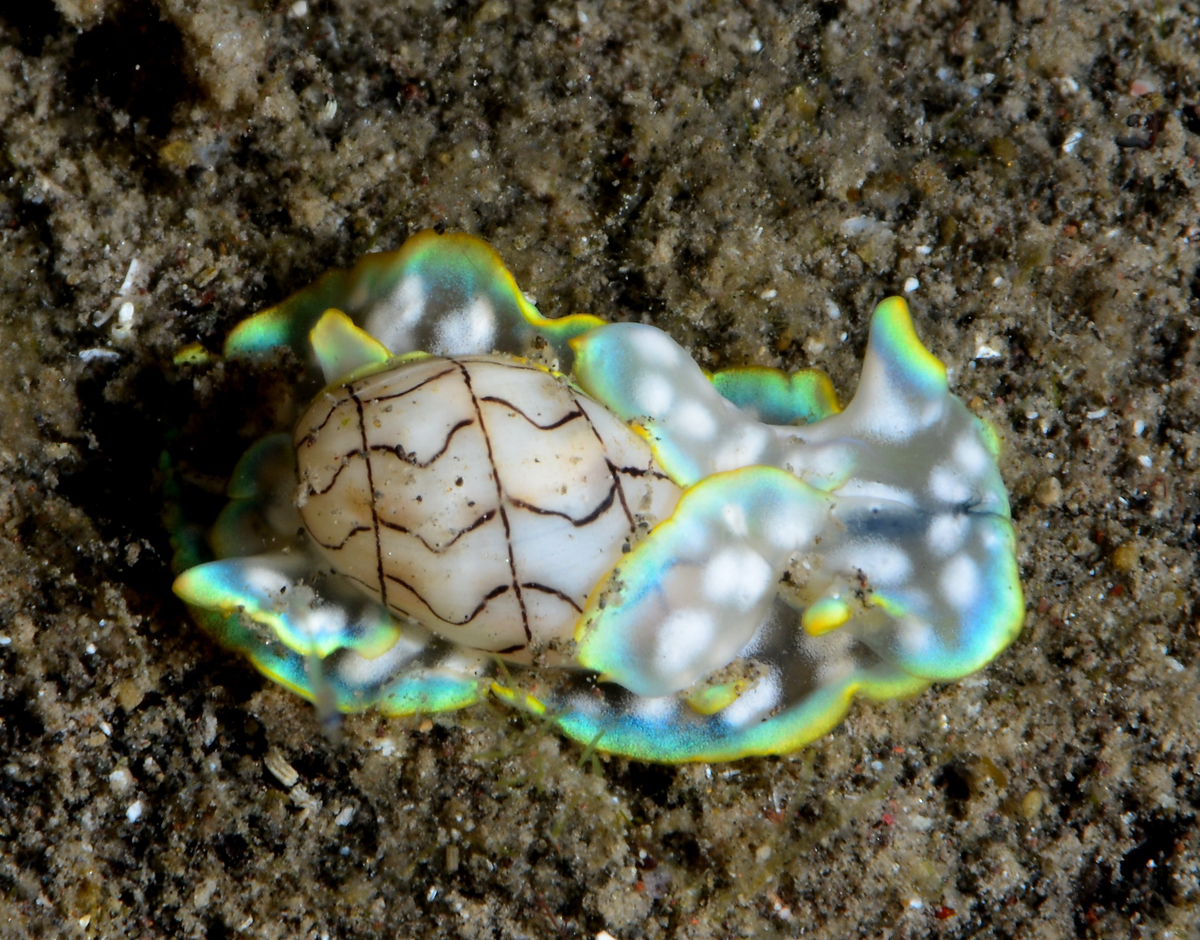
- Micromelo undatus, head end towards the right

Scientific classification
- Kingdom: Animalia
- Phylum: Mollusca
- Class: Gastropoda
- Family: Aplustridae
- Genus: Micromelo
- Species: M. undatus

Binomial name
- Micromelo undatus (Bruguière, 1792)

= Micromelo undatus =

Miniature melo

Species of mollusc

Micromelo undatus, common name the miniature melo, is an uncommon species of small sea snail or bubble snail, a marine opisthobranch gastropod mollusk in the family Aplustridae.

== Distribution ==
This species occurs in the Caribbean, Florida, Costa Rica, Panama, Bermuda, Brazil, Cape Verde Islands, Canary Islands, Ascension Island, Eastern Atlantic, South Africa, Japan, Thailand, Bali, and the State of Hawaii.

== Description ==
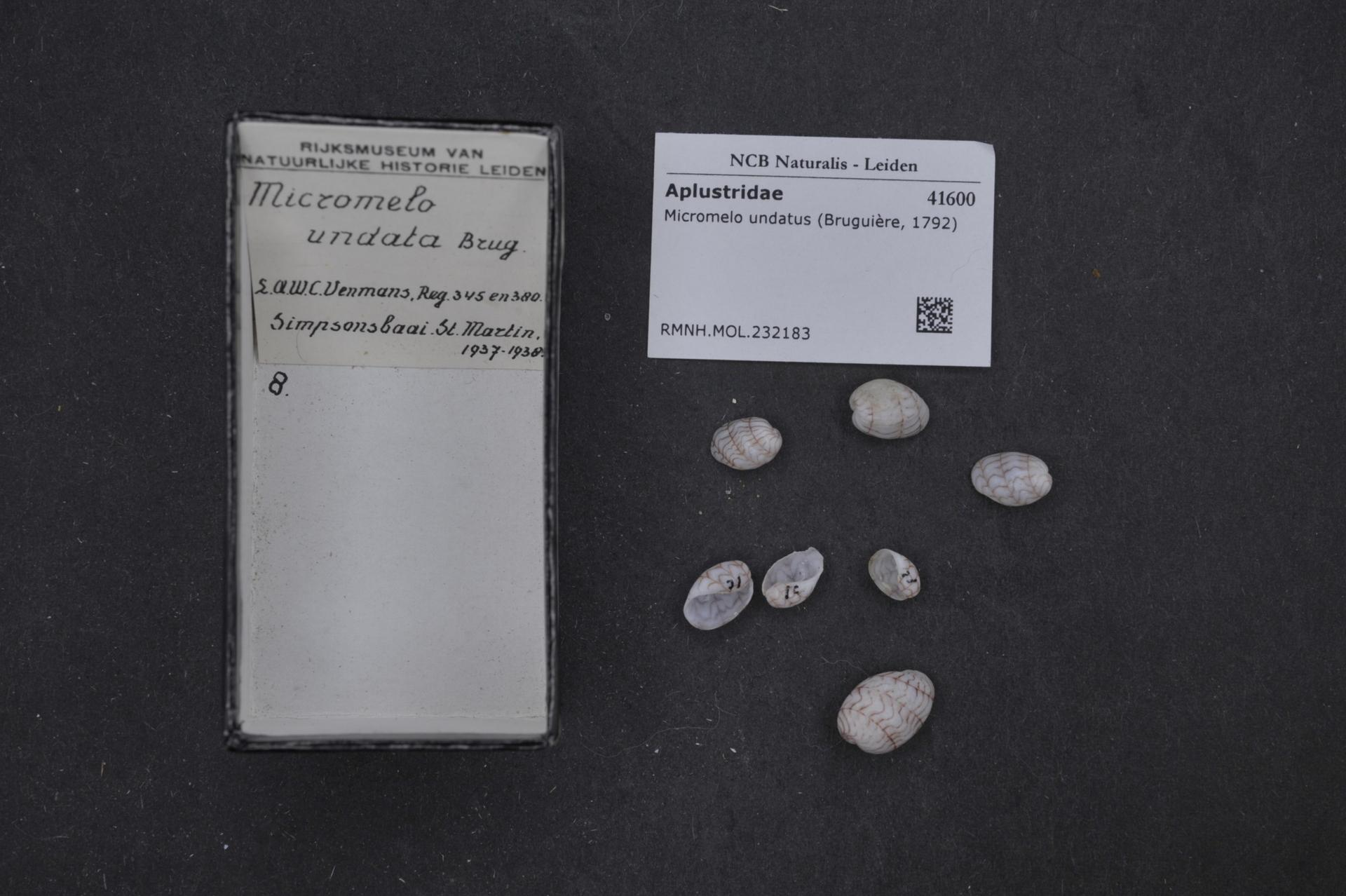
Micromelo undatus shells.

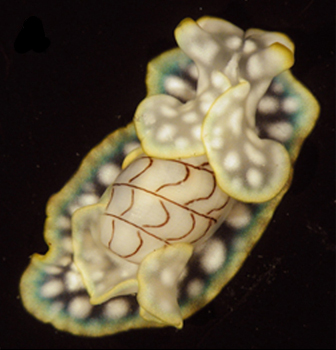
Micromelo undatus, head end towards the upper right.

The thinly calcified shell is covered with undulating brown lines, crossed with two other spiral lines. The shell length is 12 to 17 mm. The maximum recorded shell length is 17 mm.

The large, colorful body is blue with white spots. The margin of the foot has a diffuse blue line.

== Habitat ==
Minimum recorded depth is 0 m. Maximum recorded depth is 5 m. It lives on soft substrates and on the algal turf areas of rocky reefs.

== Feeding habits ==
This snail feeds on cirratulinid polychaete worms. The toxins from these worms become incorporated into the snail's tissues and are then used for the bubble snail's own defense.
