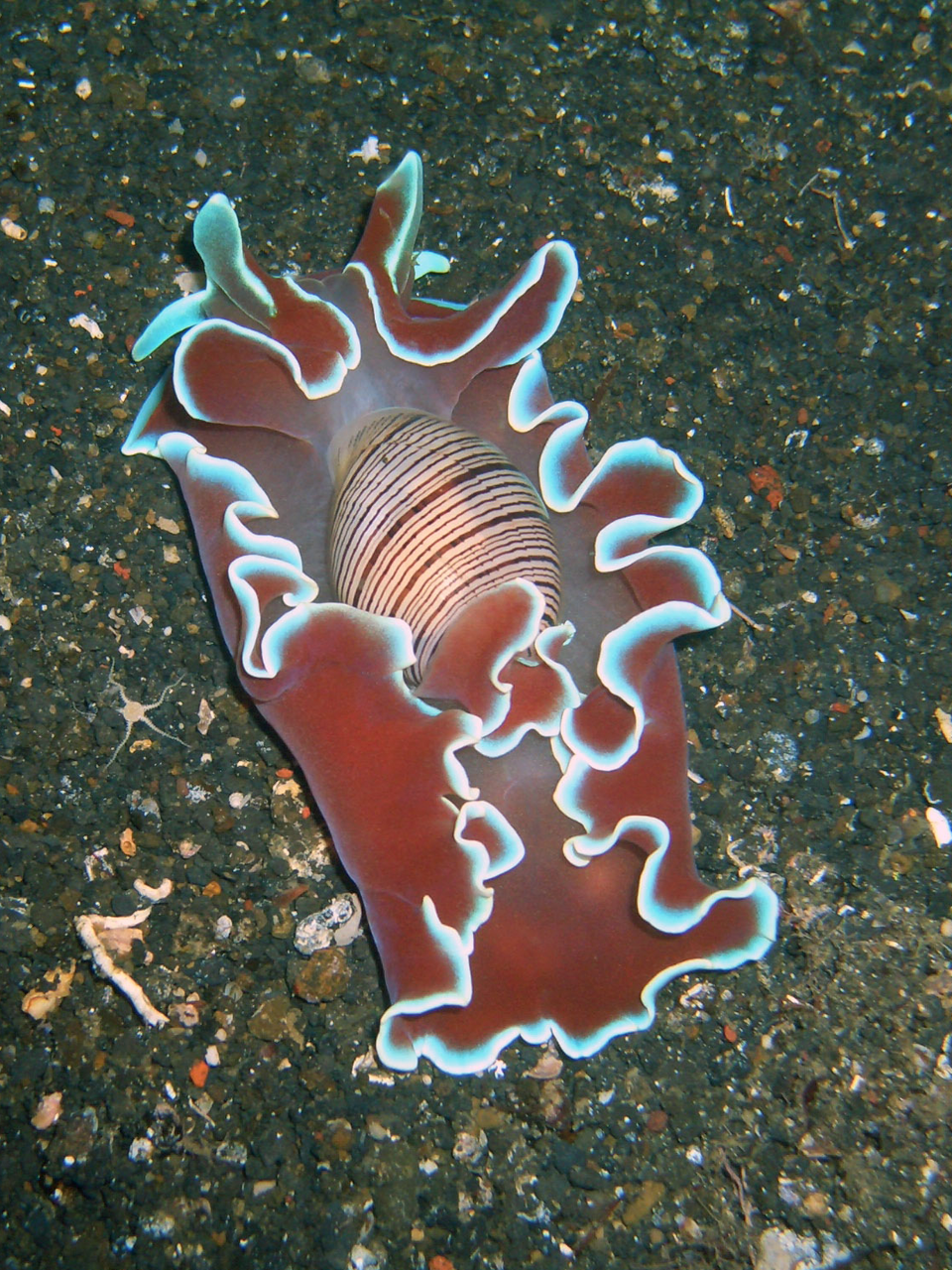

Scientific classification
- Kingdom: Animalia
- Phylum: Mollusca
- Class: Gastropoda
- Family: Aplustridae
- Genus: Hydatina
- Species: H. physis

Binomial name
- Hydatina physis (Linnaeus, 1758)

= Hydatina physis =

Species of gastropod

Hydatina physis is a species of sea snail, a bubble snail, a marine opisthobranch gastropod mollusk in the family Aplustridae. Its common names include striped paper bubble, green-lined paper bubble, brown-lined paper bubble, and rose petal bubble shell.

== Distribution ==
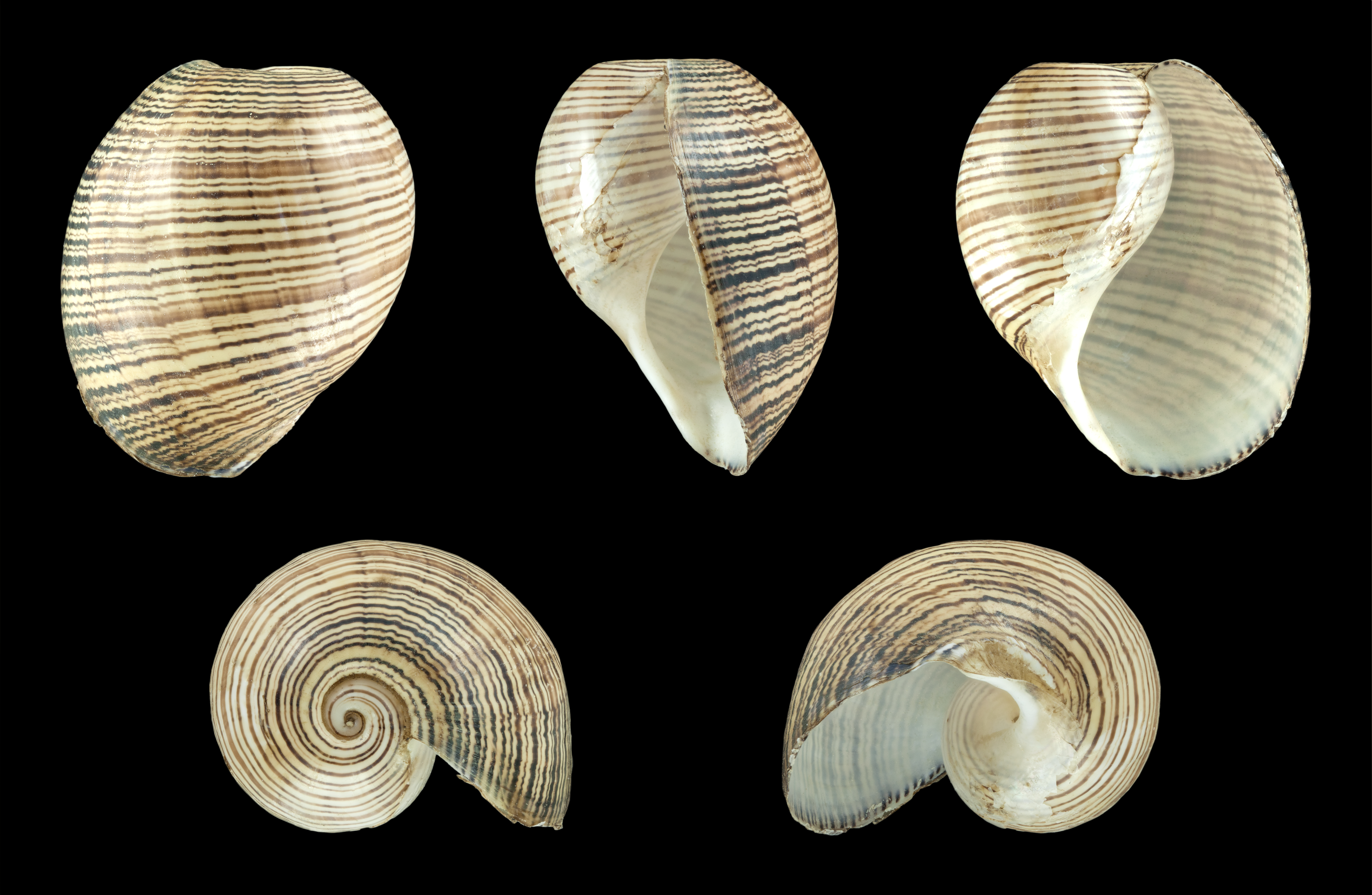

This bubble snail's distribution is circumglobal in tropical waters – the Red Sea, South Africa, West Africa, Arabian Sea, the Maldives, the Philippines to Hawaii, Australia, New Zealand, Canary Islands, Brazil, and the Lusitanic area (Europe).

== Description ==
This species lives in shallow water, crawling and burrowing into the sand. It feeds on polychaete worms of the family Cirratulidae, mussels and slugs. Its color can vary from very dark to a pale pinkish white. The shell is thin, globose and fragile. The last whorl covers the rest of the whorls.

There is no operculum. The large foot has lateral parapodia (fleshy winglike flaps). The large body cannot be fully retracted into its shell. The sensory mechanisms are well-developed. The egg mass is gathered on the mantle before being attached to the sand by a mucous thread.

The shell coloration is translucent white with transverse brown lines.

The shell height is up to 57 mm, and the width is up to 46 mm.
