= Wear (disambiguation) =

Wear is surface erosion or deformation by friction.

Wear may also refer to:

- Wearing clothes
- Wear (journal), in materials science
- Wear (surname), includes a list of people
- Wear OS, mobile operating system
- River Wear, in northeast England
- WEAR-TV, a TV station affiliated with ABC in Pensacola, FL/Mobile, AL
- World Engineering Anthropometry Resource, (WEAR), a global non-profit
- Wearing ship or jibe, a sailing maneuver

== See also ==
- Wear and tear, damage that naturally occurs as a result of use or aging
- Wear Valley (disambiguation)
- Weare (disambiguation)
- Wearing (disambiguation)
- WAER, an FM radio station in Syracuse, New York, US
- Wair (disambiguation)
- Ware (disambiguation)
- Weir (disambiguation)
- Were (disambiguation)
- Where (disambiguation)
- Whir (disambiguation)
- Whirr, an American band
