= Waring (disambiguation) =

Waring is an English surname.

Waring may also refer to:

- Waring, Texas, a community in the United States
- Waring Point, a headland in Wrangel Island, Chukotka, Russian Federation
- Waring School, Beverly, Massachusetts, United States
- Waring & Gillow, English furniture manufacturer and retailer
- A brand of Conair Corporation

== See also ==
- Waering, a surname
- Wareing, a surname
- Wearing (surname)
