= Hardware =

Hardware may refer to:

== Technology ==
=== Computing and electronics ===
- Electronic hardware, interconnected electronic components which perform analog or logic operations
  - Digital electronics, electronics that operate on digital signals
    - Computer hardware, physical parts of a computer
    - Networking hardware, devices that enable use of a computer network
  - Electronic component, device in an electronic system used to affect electrons, usually industrial products

=== Other technologies ===
- Household hardware, equipment used for home repair and other work, such as fasteners, wire, plumbing supplies, electrical supplies, utensils, and machine parts
- Builders hardware, metal hardware for building fixtures, such as hinges and latches
- Hardware (development cooperation), in technology transfer
- Drum hardware, used to tension, position, and support the instruments
- Military technology, application of technology to warfare
- Music hardware, devices other than instruments to create music

== Entertainment ==
- Hardware (Krokus album), 1981
- Hardware (Billy Gibbons album), 2021
- Hardware (band), consisting of Bootsy Collins, Buddy Miles, and Stevie Salas
- Hardware (character), a character from Milestone Comics
- Hardware (film), a 1990 film
- Hardware (TV series), a British situation comedy
- Hardware: Online Arena, a 2002 video game
- "Hardware", a 1987 science fiction story by Robert Silverberg

== Other uses ==
- Hardware, Virginia, an unincorporated community in Fluvanna County, Virginia
- Hardware (surname)

== See also ==
- Hardware acceleration, the speedup of computing tasks by performing them in customized hardware rather than software
- Hardware architecture, the identification of a system's physical components and their interrelationships
- Hardware engineering, or computer engineering
- Ware
- Open-source hardware
- Hardware store, a business which sells household hardware
- Materiel, equipment or hardware, and supplies in military and commercial supply chain management
- Medals
- Trophies
- Software
- Open-source software
