= Were (disambiguation) =

Were is an archaic term for an adult male human, now used as a prefix to indicate a type of shapeshifter. Were may also refer to:

- were, a preterite and irrealis form of the English copular verb to be
- Were music, a style of Muslim religious music
- WERE, a radio station licensed to Cleveland Heights, Ohio, United States
- Boky Wéré, a village in Mali
- Were (river), a river in Wiltshire, England
- Were language, a language of Papua New-Guinea
- Wèré, a variety of the Upper Morehead language of Papua New-Guinea
- Were or Warra, a common element in the names of Oromo clans of Ethiopia
- Were (surname)

== See also ==
- We're
- Where (disambiguation)
- Wear (disambiguation)
- Ware (disambiguation)
