= Hans Peterson =

Swedish writer (1922–2022)

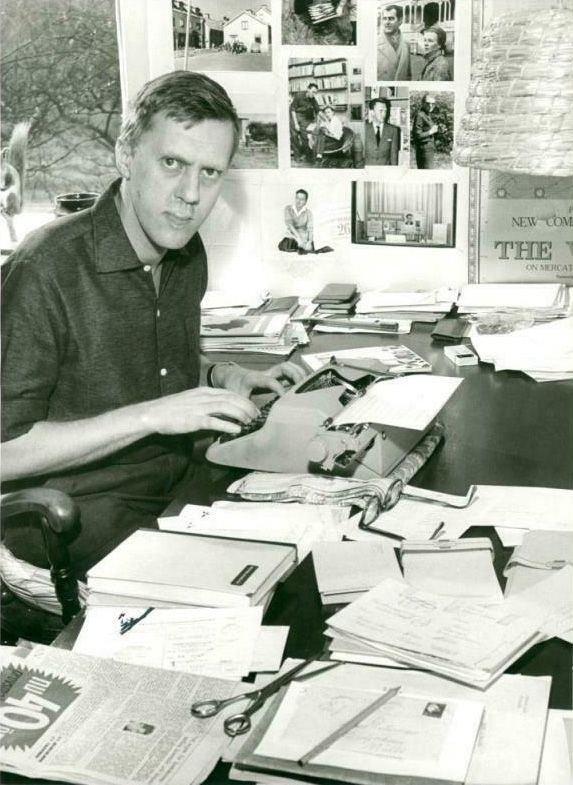
- Peterson in 1961
- Born: 26 October 1922; Väring, Sweden
- Died: 16 August 2022 (aged 99)
- Writing career
- Genre: Children's literature
- Notable awards: Astrid Lindgren Prize, 1971

Hans Peterson (26 October 1922 – 16 August 2022) was a Swedish writer, mainly of children's literature.

== Personal life ==
Peterson was born on 26 October 1922 in Väring, Västergötland, Sweden.

He died, reportedly by suicide, on 16 August 2022, at the age of 99.

== Prizes and recognition ==
Peterson received a number of prizes and recognition for his work, including:

- The Svenska Dagbladet Literature Prize, 1955
- The Nils Holgersson Plaque, 1958 (for Magnus, Mattias och Mari)
- German Prize for Children's Literature (Deutscher Jugendliteraturpreis), 1959
- The Astrid Lindgren Prize, 1971
- Wettergrens barnbokollon, 1992

== Works ==
Works of Hans Peterson
Original title	Translated title	Year published	Notes
Stina och Lars på vandring		1945	
Bröderna		1947	
De ensamma		1947	
Stina och Lars i Afrika		1947	
Stina och Lars rymmer		1948	
Den uppdämda ravinen		1949	
Flickan och sommaren		1950	
Okänt land i sikte		1950	
Lärkorna		1952	
Janne		1954	
Stina och Lars i fjällen	Stina and Lars in the mountains	1955	illustrated by Eva Laurell, translated by Patricia Crampton
Det kallas kärlek		1955	
Hejda solnedgången		1955	
Kvinnors kärlek		1956	
Magnus och ekorrungen	Magnus and the squirrel	1956	illustrated by Ilon Wikland, translated by Madeleine Hamilton
Magnus, Mattias och Mari	Magnus and the van horse	1957	illustrated by Ilon Wikland, translated by Marianne Turner
Sjörövare i sikte		1957	
Ett lejon i huset		1957	
Skådespelaren		1957	
Magnus i hamn	Magnus in the harbour	1958	illustrated by Ilon Wikland, translated by Marianne Turner
Petter Jönsson som hade en gitarr	Peter Johnson and his guitar	1959	illustrated by Iben Clante, translated by Marianne Turner
Magnus i fara	Magnus in danger	1959	illustrated by Ilon Wikland, translated by Marianne Turner
Älskarinnan		1959	
När vi snöade inne	The day it snowed	1959	illustrated by Ilon Wikland, translated by Irène D. Morris
Gubben och kanariefågeln	The old man and the bird	1960	illustrated by Ylva Källström, translated by Marianne Helweg
Måns och Mia	Tom and Tabby	1960	illustrated by Olle Montelius
När vi regnade inne	The day it rained	1960	illustrated by Ilon Wikland, translated by Irène D. Morris
Cecilia		1961	
Känner du Jonas?		1961	
Magnus och skeppshunden Jack	Magnus and the ship's mascot	1961	illustrated by Ilon Wikland, translated by Marianne Turner
Resebidrag		1961	
Stina och Anders i Göteborg		1961	
Jonas går på stan		1961	
Kvinnorna		1962	
Mick och Malin	Mickey and Molly	1962	illustrated by Olle Montelius
Lill-Olle och sommardagen	Benjamin has a birthday	1962	illustrated by Harald Wiberg, translated by Kay Ware and Lucille Sutherland
Det nya huset	The new house	1962	illustrated by Ylva Källström, translated by Kay Ware and Lucille Sutherland
Liselott och garaffen	Liselott and the Quiffin	1962	illustrated by Ulla Sundin-Wickman, translated by Annabelle MacMillan
Boken om Magnus		1963	
Hunden Buster	Brownie	1963	illustrated by Paul Galdone
Historien om en by		1963	
Här kommer Petter	Here comes Peter	1963	illustrated by Stig Södersten, translated by Marianne Turner
En sommar för Erika		1964	
När hönsen blåste bort	The day the chickens blew away	1964	illustrated by Ilon Wikland, translated by Irène D. Morris
Petter kommer igen	Peter comes back	1964	illustrated by Stig Södersten, translated by Marianne Turner
Liselott och de andra	Lisa settles in	1965	illustrated by Stig Södersten, translated by Irène D. Morris
Petter klarar allt	Peter makes his way	1966	illustrated by Stig Södersten, translated by Evelyn Ramsden
Sara och blåmesen	Sara and the blue tit	1966	illustrated by Fibben Hald, translated by Irène D. Morris
Älskaren		1966	
Bara Liselott	Just Lisa	1967	illustrated by Stig Södersten, translated by Irène D. Morris
Den nya bron	The new bridge	1967	illustrated by Ylva Källström, translated by Irène D. Morris
Magnus hade en ekorre	Erik has a squirrel	1967	illustrated by Ilon Wikland, translated by Christine Hyatt
Sara och sommarhuset	Sara in summer-time	1967	illustrated by Fibben Hald, translated by Patricia Crampton
Magnus, Lindberg och hästen Mari	Erik and the Christmas Horse	1968	illustrated by Ilon Wikland, translated by Christine Hyatt
Expedition snöstorm		1968	
Jag vill inte, sa Sara	I don't want to, said Sara	1968	illustrated by Ulf Löfgren, translated by Irène D. Morris
Lill-Anna, Johan och den vilda björnen		1968	
Stina och Lars reser till mormor		1968	
Stina och Lars på äventyr		1968	
Franssonsbarna i Fågelhult		1969	
När Per gick vilse i skogen	When Peter was Lost in the Forest	1969	illustrated by Harald Wiberg
Nästan en idyll		1970	
Barn, barnbok, barboksförfattare		1970	
Min pappa är läkare		1970	
Sara och lillebror	Sara and her brother	1970	illustrated by Fibben Hald, translated by Marianne Helweg
Åke går till sjöss		1970	
Hur blev det hav?		1970	
Pelle Jansson, en kille med tur	Pelle Jansson	1970	illustrated by Palle Bregnhøi, translated by Hanne Barnes
Vad händer i havet?		1970	
Titta jag kan gå	Look what I can do	1971	illustrated by Angelica Serrano, translated by Patricia Crampton
Elise och Rickard		1971	
Pelle Jansson, en kille mitt i stan	Pelle in the big city	1971	illustrated by Palle Bregnhøi, translated by Hannes Barnes
Pelle Jansson, en kille som inte ger sig	Pelle in trouble	1972	illustrated by Palle Bregnhøi, translated by Hanne Barnes
Elise ensam		1972	
Den gamla bilen		1973	
Berättelsen om Elin		1973	
Dagen när allting hände		1973	
Elise och de andra		1973	
Vilse i fjällen		1974	
Varför blir det så?		1975	
Den stora snöstormen	The big snowstorm	1975	illustrated by Harald Wiberg, translated by Patricia Crampton
Malin på en öde ö		1975	
Veckan Anna och Vlasto försvann		1975	
Anders och Joakim		1976	
Svar till		1976	
Fågelpojken		1976	
Alberta		1976	
Dagen innan vintern kom		1976	
De fyra hemlösa		1977	
Kära Alberta		1977	
Fem dagar i november		1977	
Malin har en hemlighet		1977	
Dagen när Simon flyttade		1977	
Juni månad är lång		1978	
Jag, Alberta		1978	
Malin är indian		1978	
Aron heter jag		1978	
Äntligen Alberta		1979	
Dagen när Simon strejkade		1979	
Christer som älskar		1980	
Vilhelmina-den ensamma hunden		1980	
Ni får inte skiljas		1980	
Jakten på Janne		1980	
Den handikappade människan		1981	
Svenne Jägare		1981	
Någon måste vara Nora		1981	
Mormorsmordet		1981	
Den sista dagen		1981	
Hot, varning, fara		1981	
Nissa M slår tillbaka		1981	
Malin på Mississippi		1981	
Min storebror Jim		1982	
Det gäller livet		1982	
Jag är med barn		1982	
Janne ställer upp		1982	
Rånet		1983	
Malin är osynlig		1983	
Aj, det gör ont!		1983	
Silverskatten		1984	
Malin i djungeln		1984	
Hämnden		1984	
Jakten på den försvunna lådan		1985	
Den natten i Paris		1985	
Ola och Oskar		1985	
Sjörövarna kommer		1985	
Lisa blir arg		1985	
David spelar på gatan		1985	
Daniel tar flyget		1985	
Johannes		1985	
Ola och ovädret		1986	
Daniel ensam i Paris		1986	
Hemlighetsfulla husets gåta		1986	
Nora		1986	
Valdemar som hade 7 liv		1986	
Älskade Alberta		1987	
Daniel i Rom		1987	
Jon rider mot söder		1987	
Vargen jagar ensam		1988	
Mord bland näckrosor		1988	
Prins Jan är försvunnen		1988	
Björnjakten		1988	
Boken om Sara		1988	
Fredagen den trettonde		1988	
Frihet och bröd		1989	
Det stora äventyret		1989	
Simon och Helga		1989	
Handelsboden		1989	
Barnen i kopparstaden		1989	
En lördag i maj		1989	
Pilbågen		1990	
Flodfärden		1990	
Joel-pojken som försvann		1991	
Hassan Hassan vinner första åket		1991	
Ett inbrott i juni		1991	
Graven öppnar sig		1991	
Bokstavsdjur		1992	
Pieter, äventyraren		1992	
Boken om Anna		1992	
Hassan Hassans sista störtlopp		1992	
Pieter, främlingen		1993	
Hassan Hassan svartskalle		1993	
Pieter, sjörövaren		1994	
Hassan Hassan slalomåkaren		1994	
En moped i augusti		1994	
Den svarta ormen		1994	
Lina reser till farmor		1995	
Försvunnen i september		1995	
Jag, Gustav Vasa		1995	
Pedro flyr		1996	
Alla vi barn i världen		1996	
Pedro ensam		1997	
Vildhunden Leopold		1997	
Kameran ser allt		1997	
Jag, Kristina		1997	
Lina bygger en koja		1998	
Främlingens son		1998	
Jag, Karl den tolfte		1998	
Vildhunden Leopold i knipa		1998	
Jag, Gustav den tredje		1999	
Adams häst		1999	
Vildhunden Leopold i fara		2000	
Vildhunden Leopold åker tåg		2000	
Jag, Erik den fjortonde		2000	
Den främmande byn		2000	
Adam rider ensam		2001	
Vildhunden Leopold hittar hem		2001	
Jag, Martin Luther		2001	
Matti, den vita indianen		2002	
Adam och vildhästen		2002	
Jag, Karl den fjortonde Johan		2002	
Den hemliga signalen		2003	
Matti, vägvisare		2003	
Odd sjöfararen		2003	
Jag, Margareta kung byxlös		2003	
Jag, upptäcktsresande Sven Hedin		2004	
Staden brinner		2004	
Matti, jägare		2004	
Jag ska ha barn		2005	
