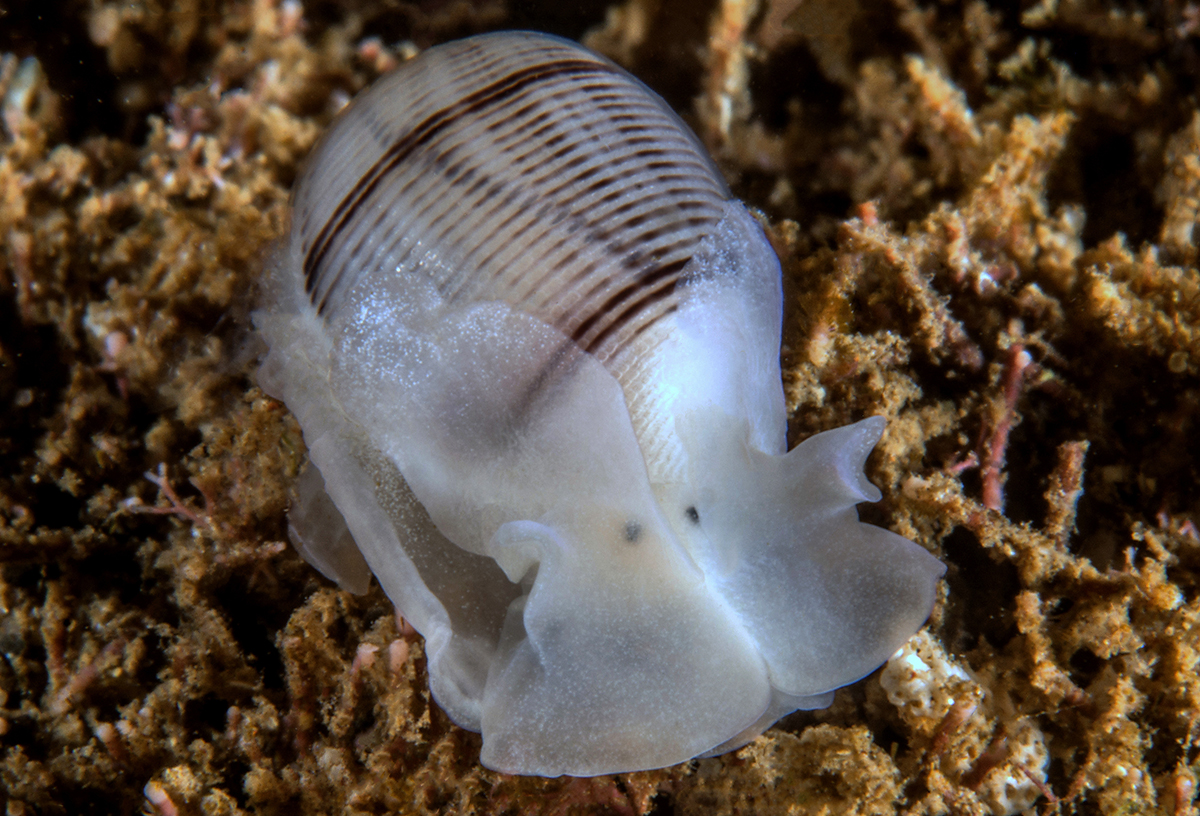

Scientific classification
- Kingdom: Animalia
- Phylum: Mollusca
- Class: Gastropoda
- Family: Aplustridae
- Genus: Bullina
- Species: B. vitrea

Binomial name
- Bullina vitrea Pease, 1860

Synonyms
- Bullina roseana Rudman, 1971; Perbullina errans Iredale, 1929

= Bullina vitrea =

Species of gastropod

Bullina vitrea is a species of small sea snail, a bubble snail, a marine gastropod mollusc in the family Aplustridae, one of the families of bubble snails. This species occurs in Australia, Hawaii, New Caledonia, and New South Wales. It is also known by a synonym, Perbullina errans, as described by Iredale in 1929.

== Description ==
The shell of this species differs from other species in the genus in that it has two black or grey spiral bands on its shell, with the upper half of the body whorl having two bands, and the lower half a single band. The shell is translucent, with some white pigmentation.
