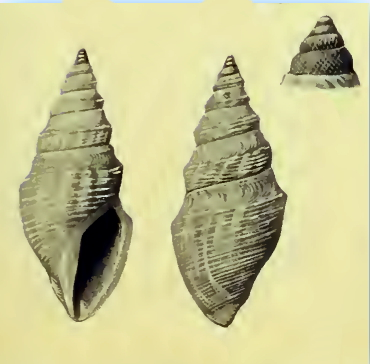
- Original image of a shell of Acamptodaphne biconica

Scientific classification
- Kingdom: Animalia
- Phylum: Mollusca
- Class: Gastropoda
- Subclass: Caenogastropoda
- Order: Neogastropoda
- Superfamily: Conoidea
- Family: Raphitomidae
- Genus: Acamptodaphne
- Species: A. biconica

Binomial name
- Acamptodaphne biconica (Schepman, 1913)

Synonyms
- Pleurotomella biconica Schepman, 1913; Cryptodaphne biconica (Schepman, 1913)

= Acamptodaphne biconica =

Species of gastropod

Acamptodaphne biconica is a species of sea snail in the family Raphitomidae.

== Description ==
The length of the shell attains 10¼ mm, its diameter 4¼ mm.

(Original description) The rather strong, white shell is biconical. It contains 9 whorls, of which 4 form a yellowish-brown protoconch, with moderately convex whorls, of which about 2 upper ones smooth, 2 with curved, raised striae, stronger just below the suture, crossed in their lower part by very fine, oblique striae. The subsequent whorls are angular, the upper part slightly excavated, the basal part nearly straight in outline. This lower part has rather inconspicuous axial ribs, nearly disappearing in the body whorl and tubercled at the angle below the excavation. Otherwise the axial sculpture consists of rather strong, nearly riblike, much curved, raised striae in the excavation and very fine growth-lines. Of spirals there are 4 on penultimate whorl, below and besides that accompanying the peripheral angle, and numerous spirals on body whorl, with eventually intermediate ones. Moreover, the shell is covered with excessively small granules, only visible under a strong lens. The body whorl at first is convex below the angle, then moderately contracted. The aperture is oblong, with a sharp angle above and a compressed, gutter-like siphonal canal below. The peristome is broken. The sinus, judging after growth lines, is large but shallow, occupying the excavated space. The columellar margin shows a rather strong layer of enamel, strongest at the short siphonal canal, where it forms an oblong umbilical pit.

== Distribution ==
This marine species was originally described based on a specimen found off Waigeo (Raja Ampat Islands, Indonesia) at a depth of 469 m. It is also known from the Indian Ocean off South Africa.
