= Vexillum johnwattsi =

Scientific classification
- Kingdom: Animalia
- Phylum: Mollusca
- Class: Gastropoda
- Subclass: Caenogastropoda
- Order: Neogastropoda
- Superfamily: Turbinelloidea
- Family: Costellariidae
- Genus: Vexillum
- Species: V. johnwattsi

Binomial name
- Vexillum johnwattsi Dekkers, 2011

Synonyms
- Vexillum (Costellaria) johnwattsi Dekkers, 2011

Species of gastropod

Vexillum johnwattsi is a species of sea snail, a marine gastropod mollusk, in the family Costellariidae, the ribbed miters.

== Description ==
The length of the shell is about 19 mm, and the width is approximately 7.5 mm. Their color can be cream, pinkish, or grayish, and it can have brown blotches. It has glass-like shiny whorls on its body.

== Distribution ==
This marine species is endemic to Australia and occurs off Western Australia.
