= Wearing =

Wearing may refer to:

- Wearing (surname), a surname
- Wearing clothes, a feature of all modern human societies
- Wearing ship, a sailing maneuver

== See also ==
- Waring, a surname
- Wear (disambiguation)
