= Where =

Where may refer to:

- Where?, one of the Five Ws in journalism
- where (command), a shell command
- Where.com, a provider of location-based applications via mobile phones
- Where (magazine), a series of magazines for tourists
- "Where?", a song by Nickelback from the album Curb, 1996
- Where, a 2022 documentary film directed by Tsai Ming-liang

== See also ==
- Ware (disambiguation)
- Wear (disambiguation)
- Were (disambiguation)
