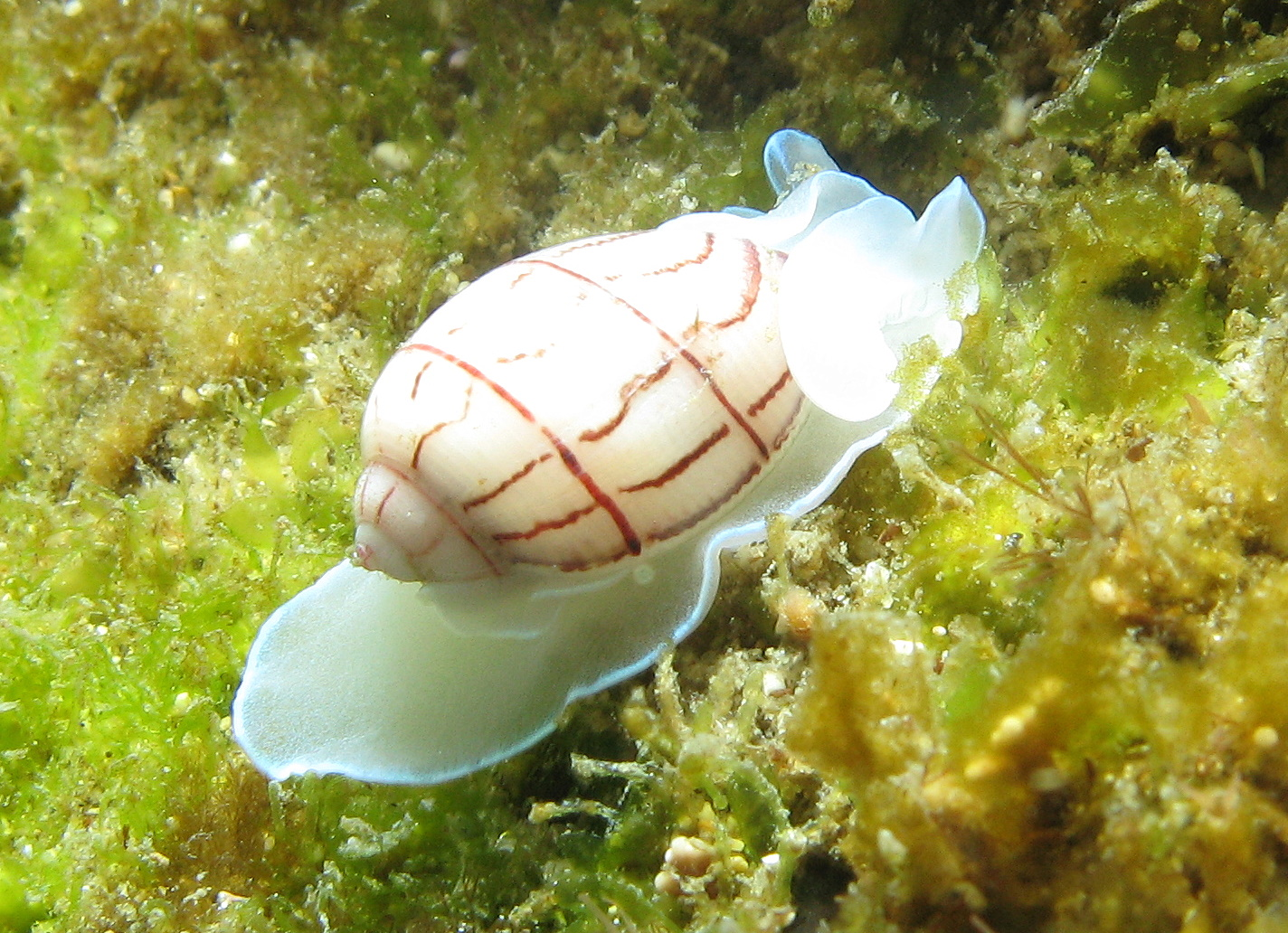
- A live individual of Bullina lineata

Scientific classification
- Kingdom: Animalia
- Phylum: Mollusca
- Class: Gastropoda
- Family: Aplustridae
- Genus: Bullina; Férussac, 1822

= Bullina =

Genus of gastropods

Bullina is a genus of sea snails or bubble snails, marine gastropod molluscs in the family Aplustridae.

== Species ==
Species within the genus Bullina include:

- Bullina callizona Sakurai & Habe, 1961
  - Distribution: Philippines
  - Description: White ovate shell with four narrow, pink, spiraling bands
- Bullina exquisita McGinty, 1955, the exquisite bubble
  - Distribution: Indian Ocean
  - Length: 7.8 mm
  - Description: Found at depths of 90-110 m
- Bullina lineata Gray 1825, the red-lined bubble
  - Distribution: Indo-Pacific, Japan to Australia
- Bullina nobilis Habe, 1950
  - Distribution: Japan, Philippines
  - Length: 10–21 mm
  - Description: Ovate shell with wide aperture, narrowing at the top, and white outer lip; shell with horizontally spiraling red-brown bands, crossing wavy vertical bands in the same color, over a white background, twisted columella
- Bullina oblonga Sowerby, 1893
  - Distribution: South Africa, Réunion
  - Length: 8-11.5 mm
  - Description: Rather rare, almost white shell, crossed by numerous red-brown, fine, spiraling bands that end at the columella
- Bullina torrei (Aguayo & Rehder, 1936)
  - Distribution: Cuba, Virgin Islands, Indian Ocean, Arabian Sea, Gulf of Bengal
  - Length: 8.5 mm
  - Description: Found at depths of 15-27 m
- Bullina virgo Habe, 1950
  - Distribution: Philippines
  - Length: 8 mm
  - Description: White shell crossed by two pale pink, spiraling bands
- Bullina vitrea Pease, 1860
  - Distribution: Australia, New Caledonia, Hawaii, Japan
  - Description: Found at depths of 12–15 m, shell with two gray or black, spiraling bands and a yellowish color at the anterior and posterior, the snail is translucent clear with white pigmentation
