= Waering =

Surname

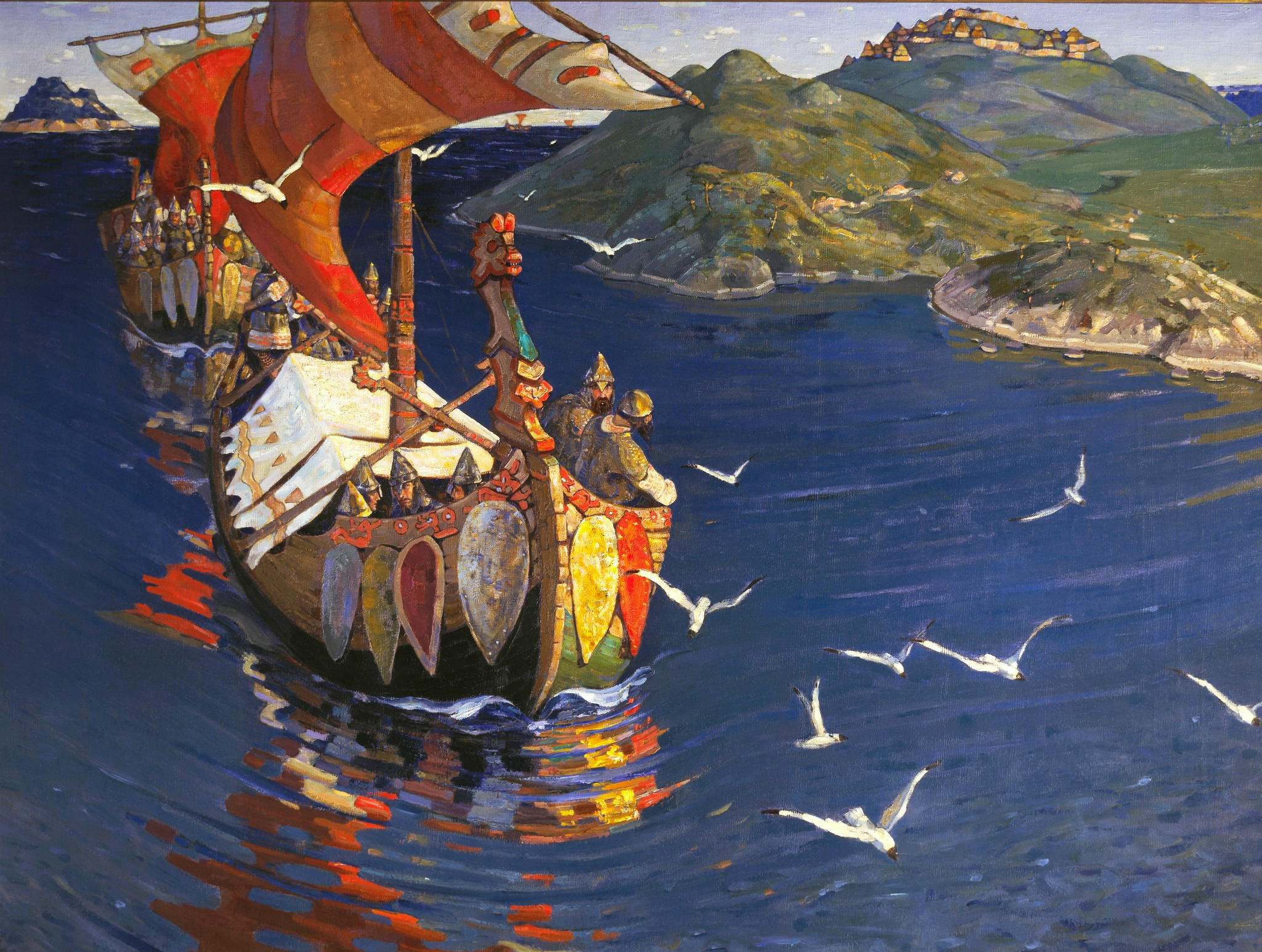
- Nicholas Roerich: Guests from Overseas (1899), a painting depicting Varangians, Scandinavians who ruled Kievan Rus' and traded with the Byzantine Empire, as well as both Anglo-Saxons and Scandinavians who served as bodyguards to the Byzantine emperor. Varangian derives from Varangus, Medieval Latin for Old English Wæring or Old Norse Væringi, from which the various forms of the surname Waering are also derived.

Origin
- Meaning: a Varangian, a confederate or, literally, 'sworn companion'
- Region of origin: Denmark, England, Germany, Norway, Sweden

Other names
- Variant forms: Væring, Väring, Wæring, Wäring

Waering is a Germanic surname. Although Grant Allen and Isaac Taylor described Wæring as an Anglo-Saxon clan name equivalent to the Norse Væringjar (autonym of the Varangians), the eminent British philologist Walter William Skeat suggested that it might be a patronymic.

== Etymology and history ==
Væringi (the singular of Væringjar) was originally a compound of two words. Vár means 'pledge' or 'faith' and is the name of the Norse god of oaths. It is cognate with the Anglo-Saxon noun wǽr (meaning 'fidelity,' 'protection,' 'agreement,' 'pledge,' 'promise' or 'bond of friendship'). Gengi means 'companion' and is cognate with the Anglo-Saxon genga of the same meaning. Thus, the two together mean 'sworn companion' or 'confederate.' According to Danish Slavist Adolf Stender-Petersen, it means 'men who engage in a pursuit in a relationship of mutual responsibility,' but another theory is that it refers to someone who enters into the service or comes under the protection of a new lord by an oath of fealty. Members of the Varangian Guard, elite Anglo-Saxon or Norse bodyguards of the Byzantine Emperor, took such an oath. Some scholars, including linguist Elof Hellquist, assume a derivation from vár with the suffix -ing (that is to say, without gengi). However, the reduction of gengi to -ing could parallel that seen in Old Norse foringi ('leader'), cognate with Anglo-Saxon foregenga ('forerunner,' 'predecessor,' 'ancestor' or 'attendant').

Walter William Skeat suggested that the name might be the source of the respective names of the English town and county of Warwick, Warwickshire, which are documented as having been Wærincwīc/Wæringwīc and Wæringscīr respectively in Anglo-Saxon. (Note: The letter w didn't exist in the Anglo-Saxon alphabet, so those names were written with the letter wynn: Ƿærincƿīc/Ƿæringƿīc and Ƿæringscīr.) Isaac Taylor was more firmly of this opinion. Grant Allen similarly places the Wærings at Warrington. However, others see Warwick and Warrington as being derived from the Anglo-Saxon word wæring or wering, which mean a 'wall' or 'bank'—with wering carrying the additional meaning of 'dam' and, hence, 'weir.'

The English surnames Waring, Wareing and Wearing may be of the same derivation as Waering. However, Charles Wareing Endell Bardsley, author of A Dictionary of English and Welsh Surnames, and others assert that Waring and Wareing are derived from the Norman Warin (meaning to 'guard' or 'protect' in Frankish), Bardsley asserts that the g was added through a process of excrescence akin to Jennin becoming Jenning. Skeat accused Bardsley of confusing Wæring with Warin, pointing out that "both the original vowel and the suffix differ." Thomas William Shore used the spelling Waring for the Varangians, calling them a "mixed race," mentioning a possible connection to the Germanic Warini people, and locating their homeland on the southwest shore of the Baltic Sea. That location also aligns with Vesevolod Merkulov's identification of the Varangians with the Slavic Wagri people.

In any case, Væringi entered into Medieval Latin as Varangus and was borrowed into Slavic languages and Greek as a result, respectively, of Varangian rule over Kievan Rus' and their service in the Varangian Guard. The guard was initially exclusively Scandinavian, but exiled Anglo-Saxon mercenaries began to dominate it after the Norman Conquest of England. The Russian varyag ('a peddler') and the Ukrainian varjah ('a big strong man') are both derived from Varangus.

== Spelling in other languages ==
The predominant spelling of the surname in modern Danish and Norwegian, Væring (more rarely Wæring), means a 'Varangian' in both of those languages. Omitting Waring, Wareing and Wearing as contested, Waering is the principal spelling in both English and German, and the surname also appears as Wäring in both German and Swedish. In the latter language, it can likewise be written as Väring, which is also the name of a locality in Skövde Municipality. All of these spellings are equivalent in their various alphabets. Both the Dano-Norwegian æ and the German and Swedish ä represent the combination of the letters a and e. The letters w and v used to be considered identical in the Scandinavian languages. In Swedish orthography, w was used specifically in the Fraktur typeface to indicate indigenous words pronounced with the voiced labiodental fricative (the "v-sound"). Since the abandonment of Fraktur, w appears mainly in loanwords, as well as in some indigenous, w-holdover surnames. This is similar to Danish, in which the interfiling of v and w (as if they were the same letter) was only deprecated in 1980. Norwegian uses v for the voiced labiodental fricative even in most loanwords, but some indigenous surnames likewise continue to be spelled with w.

== Source of names in paleontology ==
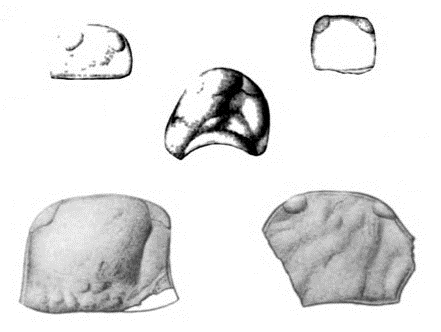
Fossil carapaces of Waeringopterus

A famous bearer of this surname was the renowned Cuban-born Norwegian-American paleontologist who published under the pen name Erik Norman Kjellesvig-Waering. He was born Erik Norman Kjellesvig, a Norwegian citizen, son of Magne Kjellesvig. His 1938 United States naturalization record notes that he was also known as Erik Norman Waering, the name appearing on his 1940 draft registration and 1956 marriage certificate. Erik K. Waering appears on his gravestone and Florida death record. The Waeringopterus genus of eurypterids, a group of extinct aquatic arthropods, is named for him. The genus is part of the Waeringopteridae family and Waeringopteroidae super family. There is also a genus of fusulinida named Waeringella.

== List of notable people with the surname ==
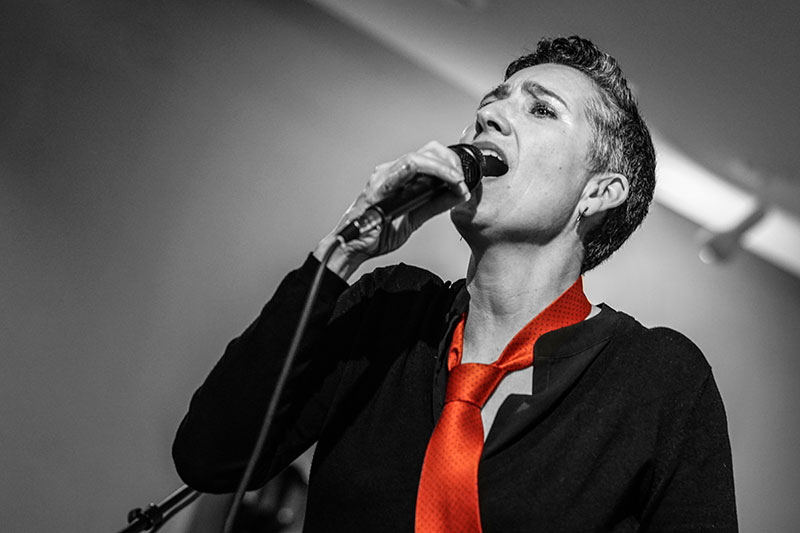
Photo of Trinelise Væring by Hreinn Gudlaugsson (2018)

- Astrid Väring (1892–1978), Swedish writer and journalist
- Erik Norman Kjellesvig-Waering (1912–1979), Norwegian-American paleontologist
- Jennie Waering, Assistant United States Attorney
- Olaf Martin Peder Væring (1837–1906), Norwegian photographer and founder of the Fotoarkiv O. Væring
- Trinelise Væring, Danish singer and songwriter
