= Bullina exquisita =

Scientific classification
- Kingdom: Animalia
- Phylum: Mollusca
- Class: Gastropoda
- Family: Aplustridae
- Genus: Bullina
- Species: B. exquisita

Binomial name
- Bullina exquisita McGinty, 1955

Species of gastropod

Bullina exquisita is a species of sea snail, a marine gastropod mollusc in the family Aplustridae, one of the families of bubble snails. The shell of the species is pink with darker pink markings.

== Description ==
The maximum recorded shell length is 7.8 mm.

== Habitat ==
Minimum recorded depth is 91 m. Maximum recorded depth is 110 m.

Dredged at 65–80 m. depth, off Louisiana.
