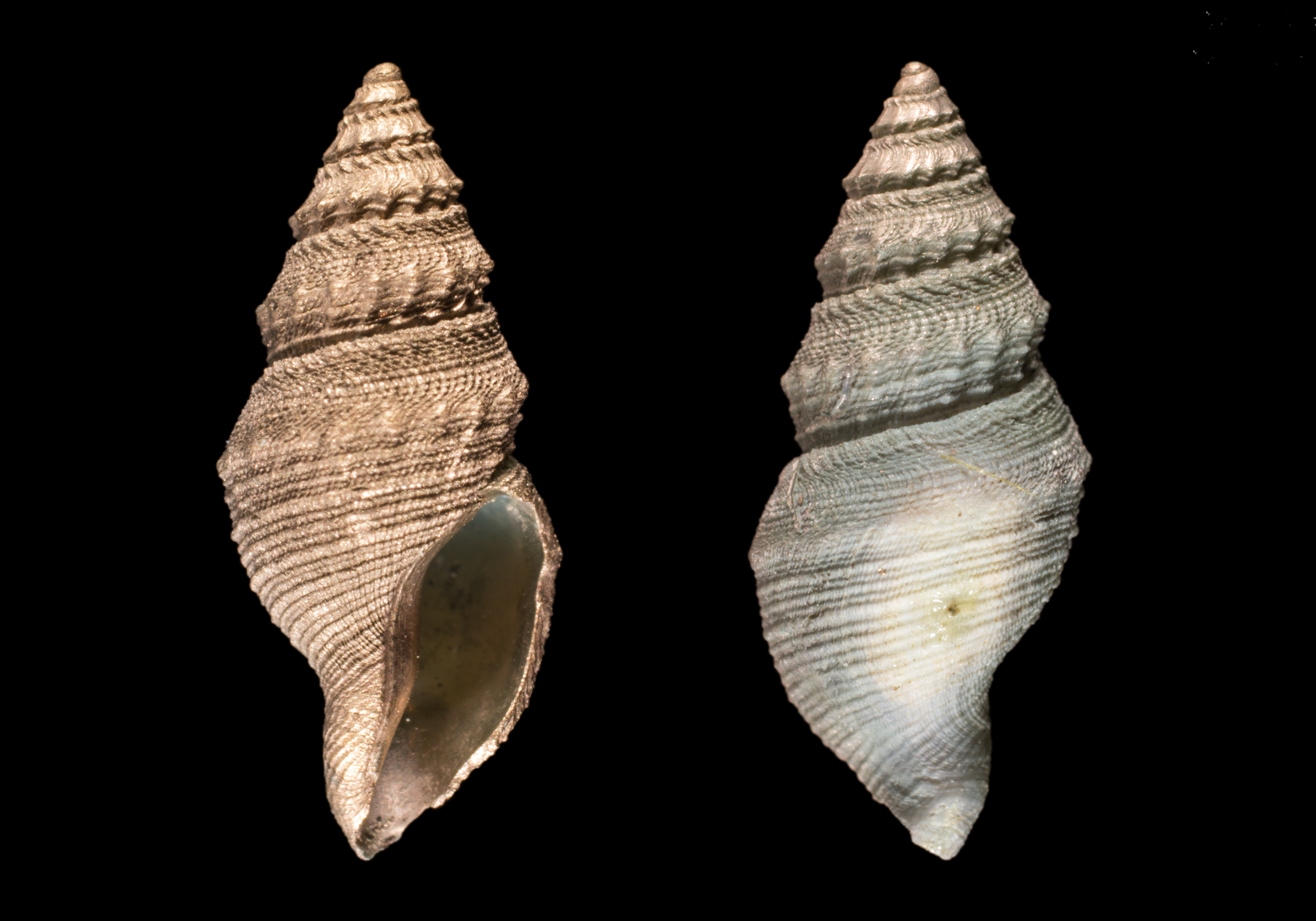
- A shell of Acamptodaphne solomonensis

Scientific classification
- Kingdom: Animalia
- Phylum: Mollusca
- Class: Gastropoda
- Subclass: Caenogastropoda
- Order: Neogastropoda
- Superfamily: Conoidea
- Family: Raphitomidae
- Genus: Acamptodaphne
- Species: A. solomonensis

Binomial name
- Acamptodaphne solomonensis Morassi & Bonfitto, 2010

= Acamptodaphne solomonensis =

Species of gastropod

Acamptodaphne solomonensis is a species of sea snail in the family Raphitomidae.

== Description ==
The holotype measures 8.2 mm × 3.6 mm (0.32 in × 0.14 in) (height times width). The aperture height is 4.0 mm (0.16 in). The paratypes are smaller.

== Distribution ==
This species is known from the western Pacific Ocean at the depths of 194–303 m (636–994 ft) off the Solomon Islands.
