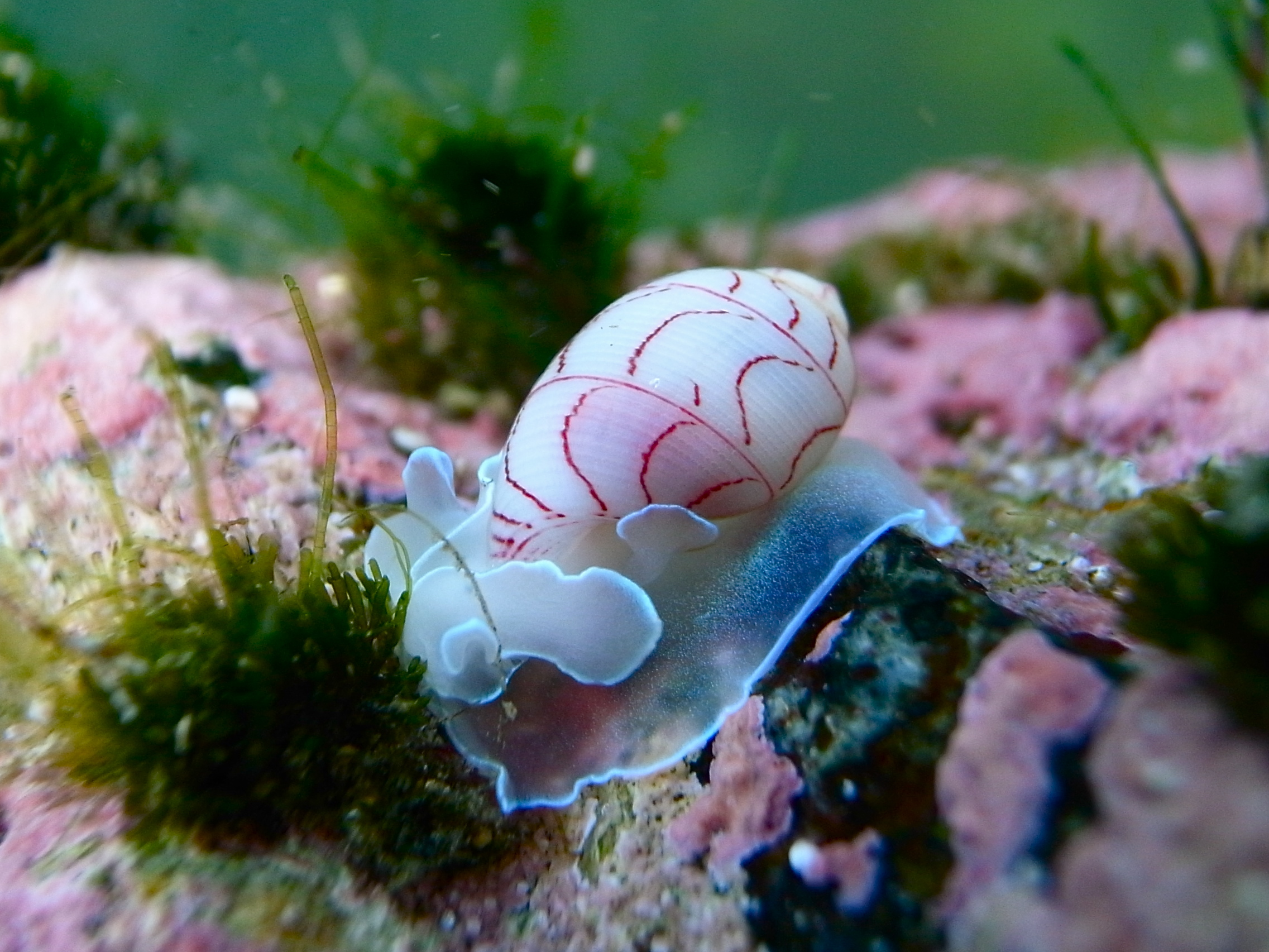

Scientific classification
- Kingdom: Animalia
- Phylum: Mollusca
- Class: Gastropoda
- Family: Aplustridae
- Genus: Bullina
- Species: B. lineata

Binomial name
- Bullina lineata Gray, 1825

= Bullina lineata =

Red-lined bubble snail

Species of sea snail

Bullina lineata, common name the red-lined bubble snail, is a species of sea snail, a marine gastropod mollusc in the family Aplustridae.

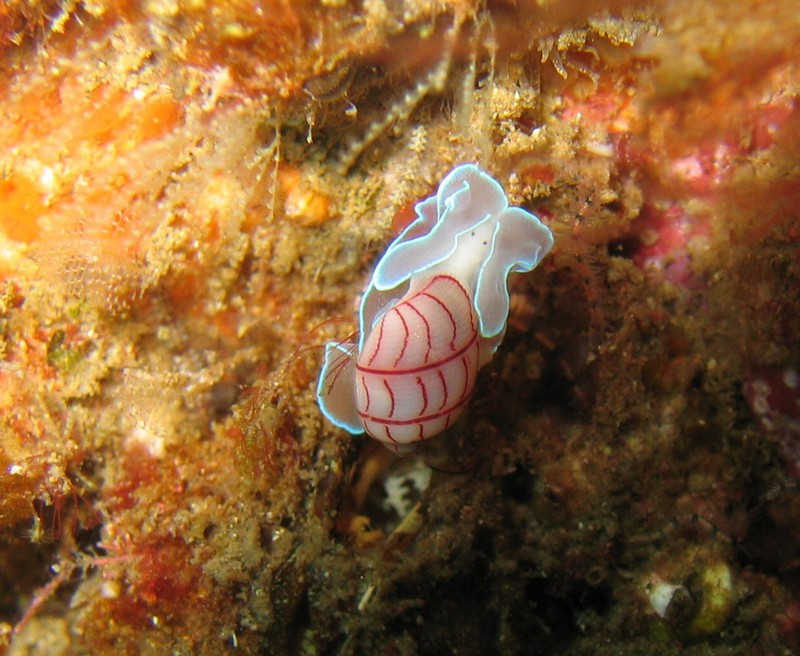
A live Bullina lineata

== Description ==
This snail has a milky-white mantle with iridescent blue edges. Small, black eyes are on the head between the head shield processes. The shell has a white background with horizontally spiraling, red-brown bands, which are crossed by vertical bands in the same color. The length is 15 to 25 mm.

== Distribution ==
This species occurs in the sublittoral zone of the Indo-Pacific from Japan to Australia and New Zealand, primarily on coral reefs and rocky shores.

== Ecology ==
The red-lined bubble snail diet consists of polychaete worms found in sand patches on rock platforms.

== Conservation status ==
This species is found sporadically, so has not been evaluated by the International Union for Conservation of Nature.
