= Christmas in the Stable =

1961 children's book by Astrid Lindgren

- Author: Astrid Lindgren
- Original title: Jul i stallet
- Illustrator: Harald Wiberg
- Language: Swedish
- Publisher: Rabén & Sjögren
- Publication date: 1961
- Publication place: Sweden
- English publication date: 1962

Christmas in the Stable (original title: Jul i stallet) is a 1961 children's book by Astrid Lindgren, illustrated by Harald Wiberg.

== Plot ==
A mother tells a story about the very first Christmas to her child. Although it had happened a long time ago in a distant land, the child imagines that it had happened on his parents' farm.

A man and a woman are very tired after a long journey and want to sleep, but there is no light in the courtyards around them. Therefore, the two travelers go into a stable. When the couple is in the stable the animals walk around the woman and warm her up. A short time later, the woman has a baby. All stars suddenly light up, one is particularly bright and stands directly above the stable. The shepherds in the fields wonder why there is a star above the stable. When they see the newborn child, they realize that the star is shining for the child. Since there is no bed, the woman puts her child in a crib. The child sleeps and is watched by the shepherds and animals. The poinsettia is shining in the sky above the stable.

== Background ==
The book was first published in 1961 in Sweden, by Rabén & Sjögren. The text had been written by Astrid Lindgren and the book was illustrated by Harald Wiberg. The story has been translated into many languages, including English, German, Low German, and Frisian. In Sweden and Germany a new edition of the book with pictures from Lars Klinting has been released in 2002. This edition has not been published in English.

== Reception ==
Stiftung Lesen said that the Christmas story is "simple but wonderfully beautiful". Kirkus Reviews added that the story is told without mentioning religious symbols and called it a "fine introduction to the meaning of Christmas for the child who (...) nestles in mother's lap to discover it".

Frankfurter Allgemeine Zeitung wrote that Astrid Lindgren is telling Christmas story in a simple way, so that the imagination can find its own pictures. Harald Wiberg illustrates the story from a dreamier, but at the same time more distant perspective than Lars Klinting.

T-Online said that Lindgren's book is already suitable for very small children. The Christmas story is told in ancient, mysterious and yet new, timeless manner, and Harald Wiberg's illustrations are wonderful.

== Awards ==
- 1970: Lewis Carroll Shelf Award
- 1973: The Brooklyn Art Books For Children Citations

== See also ==
- List of Christmas-themed literature
