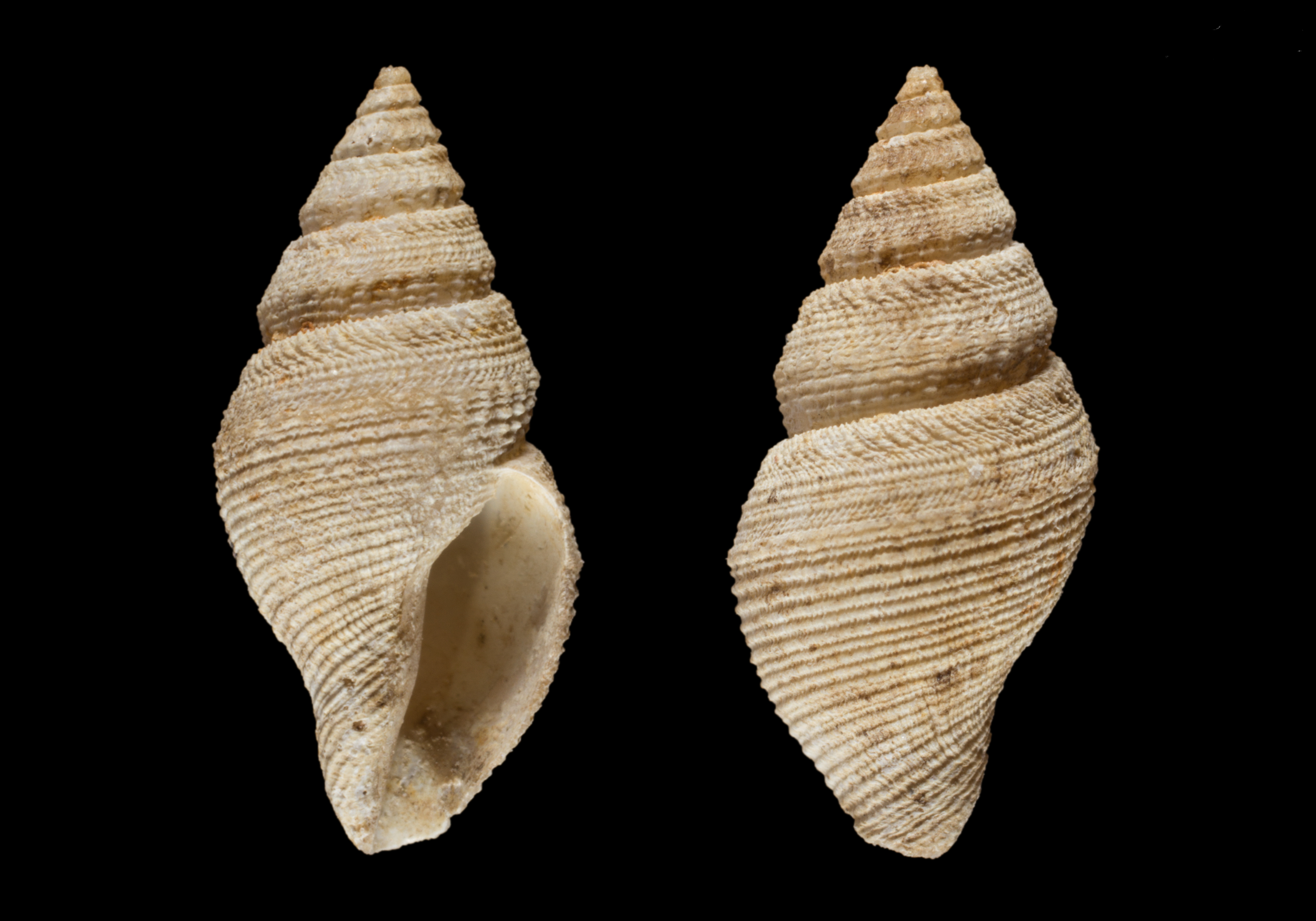
- Original image of a shell of Acamptodaphne eridmata

Scientific classification
- Kingdom: Animalia
- Phylum: Mollusca
- Class: Gastropoda
- Subclass: Caenogastropoda
- Order: Neogastropoda
- Superfamily: Conoidea
- Family: Raphitomidae
- Genus: Acamptodaphne
- Species: A. eridmata

Binomial name
- Acamptodaphne eridmata Morassi & Bonfitto, 2010

= Acamptodaphne eridmata =

Species of gastropod

Acamptodaphne eridmata is a species of sea snail in the family Raphitomidae.

== Description ==
The holotype measures 8.3 mm × 4.2 mm (0.33 in × 0.17 in) (height times width). The aperture height is 4.6 mm (0.18 in). The paratype is slightly higher but narrower (8.8 mm × 4.1 mm (0.35 in × 0.16 in)).

== Distribution ==
This species occurs in the western Pacific Ocean at the depths of 194–286 m (636–938 ft) in the Bashi Channel, Taiwan, and off the Solomon Islands.
