= Weare =

Weare may refer to:

- Weare (surname)
- Weare, New Hampshire, USA
- Weare, Somerset, England
- Weare Giffard, Devon, England
- Weare Township, Michigan, USA

== See also ==
- Wearing (disambiguation)
