= Bullina callizona =

Scientific classification
- Domain: Eukaryota
- Kingdom: Animalia
- Phylum: Mollusca
- Class: Gastropoda
- Family: Aplustridae
- Genus: Bullina
- Species: B. callizona

Binomial name
- Bullina callizona K.I. Sakurai & T. Habe, 1961

Species of gastropod

Bullina callizona is a species of sea snail, a marine gastropod mollusc in the family Aplustridae, one of the families of bubble snails. The shell of the species is 10 millimetres (0.39 in) in length, and is either white or pink in colour. These snails occur along the coastlines of Japan and the Philippines.
