= Friesodielsia hainanensis =

Conservation status
- Vulnerable (IUCN 3.1)

Scientific classification
- Kingdom: Plantae
- Clade: Embryophytes
- Clade: Tracheophytes
- Clade: Spermatophytes
- Clade: Angiosperms
- Clade: Magnoliids
- Order: Magnoliales
- Family: Annonaceae
- Genus: Friesodielsia
- Species: †F. hainanensis

Binomial name
- †Friesodielsia hainanensis Y.Tsiang & P.T.Li

Synonyms
- Richella hainanensis (Tsiang & P.T.Li) Tsiang & P.T.Li

Species of plant

Friesodielsia hainanensis, synonym Richella hainanensis, is a species of plant in the Annonaceae family, native to Hainan, China. It was first described in 1964. In 2004, it was assessed as "vulnerable"; in 2022, it was listed by Plants of the World Online as "extinct".
