= Harald Wiberg =

Swedish artist

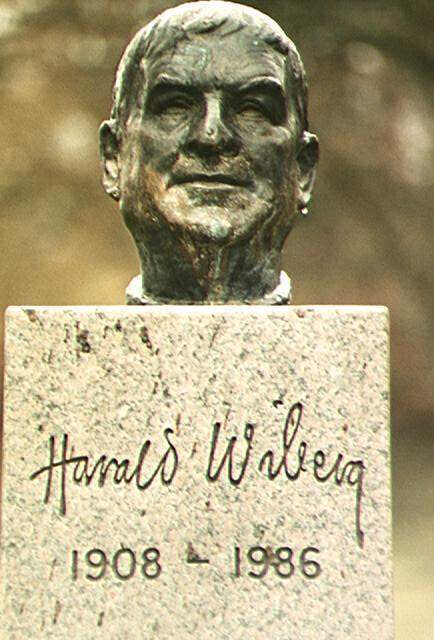
Harald Wiberg

Harald Wiberg (1 March 1908 – 15 August 1986) was a Swedish writer, artist and illustrator. He was best known for his illustrations in the books about Tomten and of Astrid Lindgren.

== Life and career ==
Wiberg was born in Ankarsrum in 1908. He attended the Stockholm College of Drama (Stockholms dramatiska högskola). Later he also studied in France and Italy. Most of his illustrations show Scandinavian landscapes, animals and traditional mythological figures. In the 1960s, he became known in Sweden through his appearances in the nature documentary show Korsnäsgårde. He became known internationally through his illustrations of the Tomten books: Tomten (1961) and Tomten and the Fox (1965). In the Swedish edition of these works, Wiberg's illustrations were published next to the original poems by Viktor Rydberg and Karl-Erik Forsslund. In the international editions the illustration appeared next to a text written by Astrid Lindgren, based on the poems and the illustrations. The success of these works prompted Wiberg to write and illustrate his own Tomten book entitled Gammaldags jul. The book was translated into English (Christmas at the tomten's farm). Another work by Viktor Rydberg, Björn's Advent on Christmas Eve (Lille Viggs äventyr på julafton, 1980) was also illustrated by Wiberg. In 1976 he received the Elsa Beskow badge for his illustrations in the book The big snowstorm (Den stora snöstuellen, 1975). On August 15, 1986, he died in Falköping.

== Works (selection) ==
Year	English Title	Swedish Title	Author
–	–	Djur i naturen (1948)	Harald Wiberg
1961	The world's strangest animals	Världens underligaste djur (1957)	Åke Löfgren
1961	The Tomten	Tomten är vaken	Astrid Lindgren
1962	Christmas in the Stable	Jul i stallet (1961)	Astrid Lindgren
1968	The bears of Big stream valley	Björnarna i Storådalen (1960)	Edor Burman
1964	Benjamin has a birthday	Lill-Olle och sommardagen (1962)	Hans Peterson
1968	Three wolverines of Rushing Valle	Storbjörnen (1960)	Edor Burman
1965	The Tomten and the Fox	Räven och tomten	Astrid Lindgren
1968	Christmas at the tomten's farm	Gammaldags jul (1967)	Harald Wiberg
–	–	Djur och landskap (1969)	Harald Wiberg
1970	When Peter Was Lost in the Forest	När Per gick vilse i skogen (1969)	Hans Peterson
1970	Dogs of the world	Hundar i färg (1966)	Ivan Swedrup
1975	The big snowstorm	Den stora snöstormen (1975)	Hans Peterson
1981	The Christmas Tomten	Lille Viggs äventyr på julafton (1980)	Viktor Rydberg

== Awards ==
- 1970: Lewis Carroll Shelf Award for Christmas in the Stable (shared with Astrid Lindgren)
- 1973: The Brooklyn Art Books For Children Citations for Christmas in the Stable (shared with Astrid Lindgren)
- 1976: Elsa Beskow-plaketten for The big snowstorm
