= Friesodielsia lalisae =

Scientific classification
- Kingdom: Plantae
- Clade: Tracheophytes
- Clade: Angiosperms
- Clade: Magnoliids
- Order: Magnoliales
- Family: Annonaceae
- Genus: Friesodielsia
- Species: F. lalisae

Binomial name
- Friesodielsia lalisae Damth., Baka & Chaowasku

Species of flowering plant

Friesodielsia lalisae is a species of flowering plant in the Annonaceae (custard apple) family. Friesodielsia lalisae is a woody climber with yellow flowers. It is native to Thailand, and was named for the Thai rapper Lisa.

== Distribution ==
Friesodielsia lalisae is native to the wet tropical biome of Thailand. The species is found in Narathiwat province, southern Thailand. It appears to grow near streams in secondary forests, at elevations of around 90 metres (300 ft).

The species has been recorded near rubber tree plantations. Its habitat is threatened by agriculture.

== Taxonomy ==
The species was first described in 2023, in the journal Willdenowia.

== Description ==
The species is similar to Friesodielsia argentea and Friesodielsia glauca.

Friesodielsia lalisae is a woody climber. Young twigs have hairs. The leaves are papery in texture, and elliptical in shape. Leaves measure 7.7–16.2 millimetres (0.30–0.64 in) in length and 2.8–5.8 millimetres (0.11–0.23 in) in width. The leaf stalks are 3–5 millimetres (0.12–0.20 in) long.

The flowers are yellow, solitary, and fragrant. The inner petals are around 19 millimetres (0.75 in) long, and converge.

== Etymology ==
The species is named for the Thai rapper Lisa Manobal. The first author noted that Lisa inspired her "to overcome any obstacles during her Ph.D. study."
