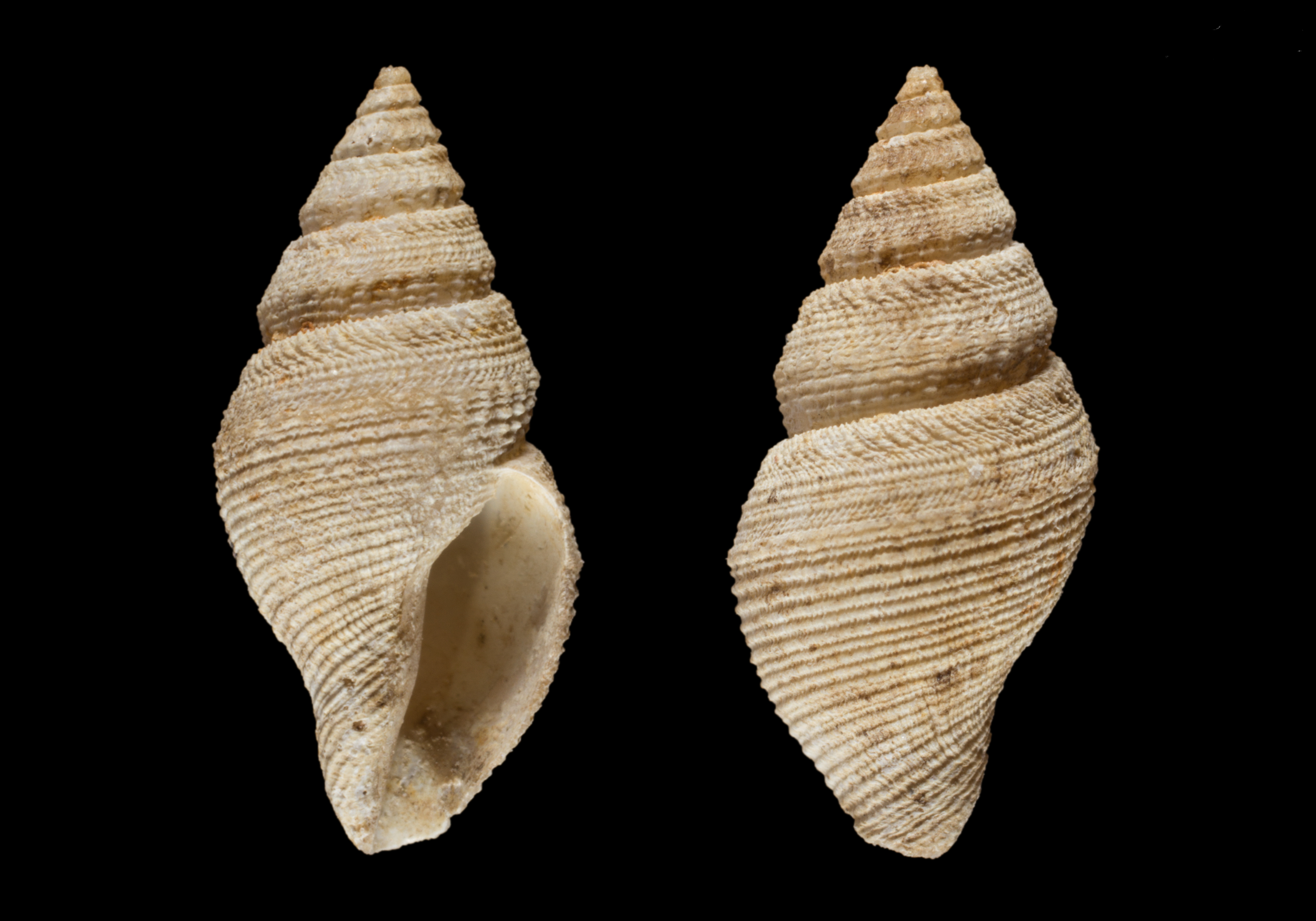
- Acamptodaphne eridmata from the Solomon Islands

Scientific classification
- Kingdom: Animalia
- Phylum: Mollusca
- Class: Gastropoda
- Subclass: Caenogastropoda
- Order: Neogastropoda
- Superfamily: Conoidea
- Family: Raphitomidae
- Genus: Acamptodaphne; Shuto, 1971

Type species
- Pleurotomella biconica Schepman, 1913

Species
- See text

Synonyms
- Cryptodaphne (Acamptodaphne) Shuto, 1971

= Acamptodaphne =

Genus of gastropods

Acamptodaphne is a genus of sea snails in the family Raphitomidae. They are small gastropods, reaching 10.2 mm (0.40 in) in length.

== Species ==
Species within the genus Acamptodaphne are:

- Acamptodaphne biconica (Schepman, 1913)
- Acamptodaphne eridmata Morassi & Bonfitto, 2010
- Acamptodaphne solomonensis Morassi & Bonfitto, 2010
