= Ware =

Ware may refer to:

== People ==
- Ware (surname)
- William of Ware (fl. 1290–1305), English Franciscan theologian

== Places ==
=== Canada ===
- Fort Ware, British Columbia

=== United Kingdom ===
- Ware, Devon
- Ware, Hertfordshire
- Ware, Kent

=== United States ===
- Ware, Elmore County, Alabama, See List of places in Alabama: S–Z#W
- Ware, Jefferson County, Alabama, See List of places in Alabama: S–Z#W
- Ware, Arkansas, see List of places in Arkansas: W
- Ware, Illinois
- Ware, Iowa
- Ware, Kentucky
- Ware, Massachusetts, a New England town
  - Ware (CDP), Massachusetts, the primary village in the town
- Ware, Missouri
- Ware, Texas
- Ware County, Georgia

== Other uses ==
- Pottery
- WARE, an AM radio station licensed to Ware, Massachusetts
- Ware people, an ethnic group in Tanzania
- Wares (musical group), a Canadian music group
- Ware Group, a covert American communist organization
- Ware F.C., a Hertfordshire-based football team
- Ware Opening, an uncommon chess opening

== See also ==
- Hardware
- Silverware
- Software
- Warez, slang for illegally obtained software
- Wear (disambiguation)
