= Whir =

Whir can refer to:

- WHIR, a radio station in Danville, Kentucky
- "Whir", a song by Smashing Pumpkins on the album Pisces Iscariot

== See also ==
- Whirr
- Whirl (disambiguation)
