= Wear Valley (disambiguation) =

Wear Valley or Wears Valley may refer to:

- Wear Valley in County Durham, England
- Weardale in County Durham
- Wears Valley, Tennessee, an unincorporated community
- Wear Cove, the valley in which Wears Valley, Tennessee is located
