= Väring =

- Location within Västra Götaland Location within Sweden
- Coordinates: 58°30′N 13°57′E
- Country: Sweden
- Province: Västergötland
- County: Västra Götaland County
- Municipality: Skövde Municipality

Area
  - Total: 0.67 km^{2} (0.26 sq mi)

Population (31 December 2010)
  - Total: 571
  - Density: 856/km^{2} (2,220/sq mi)
- Time zone: UTC+1 (CET)
  - Summer (DST): UTC+2 (CEST)

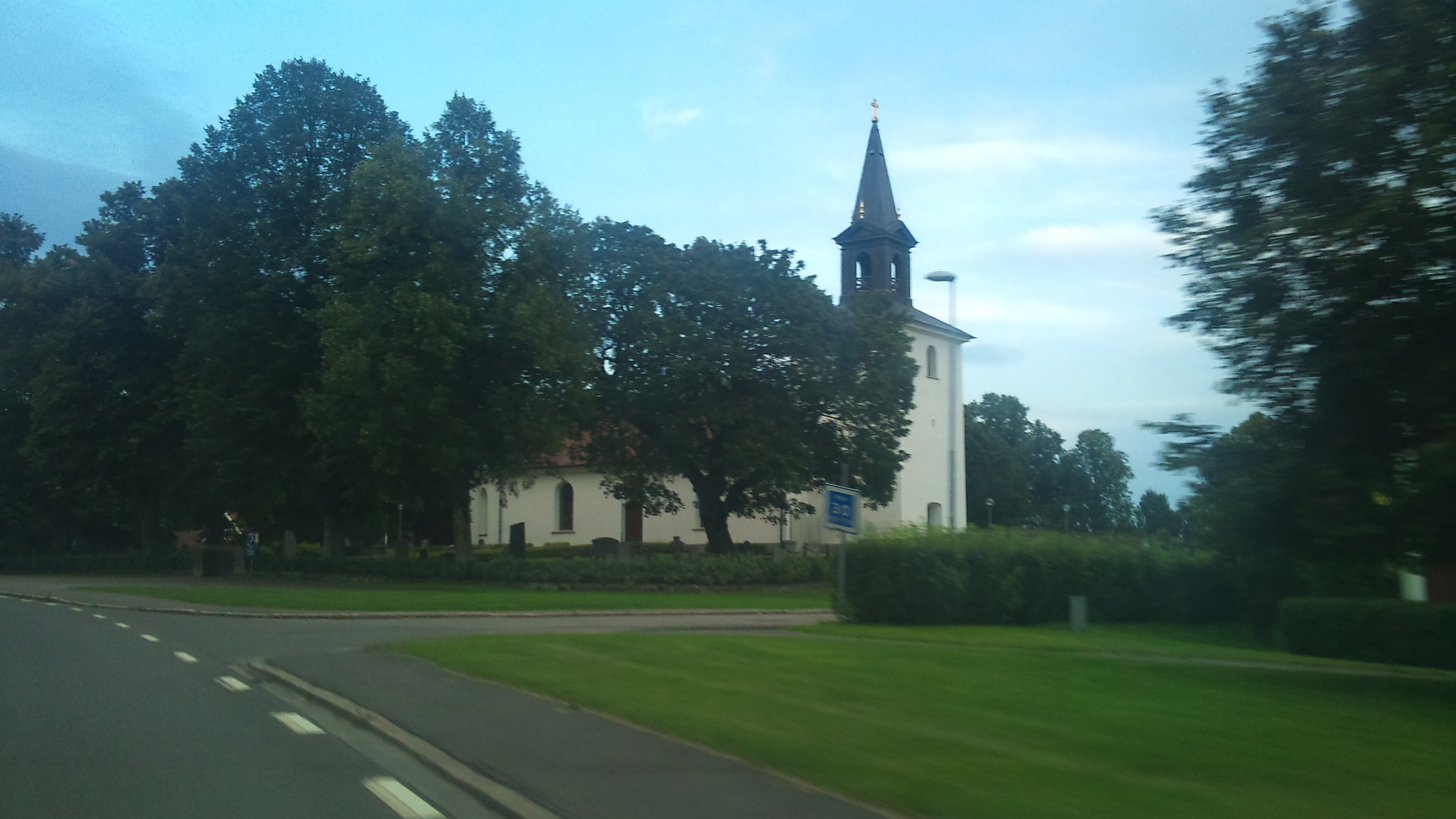
Väring church

Väring is a locality situated in Skövde Municipality, Västra Götaland County, Sweden with 571 inhabitants in 2010.

== See also ==
- Waering (surname)
