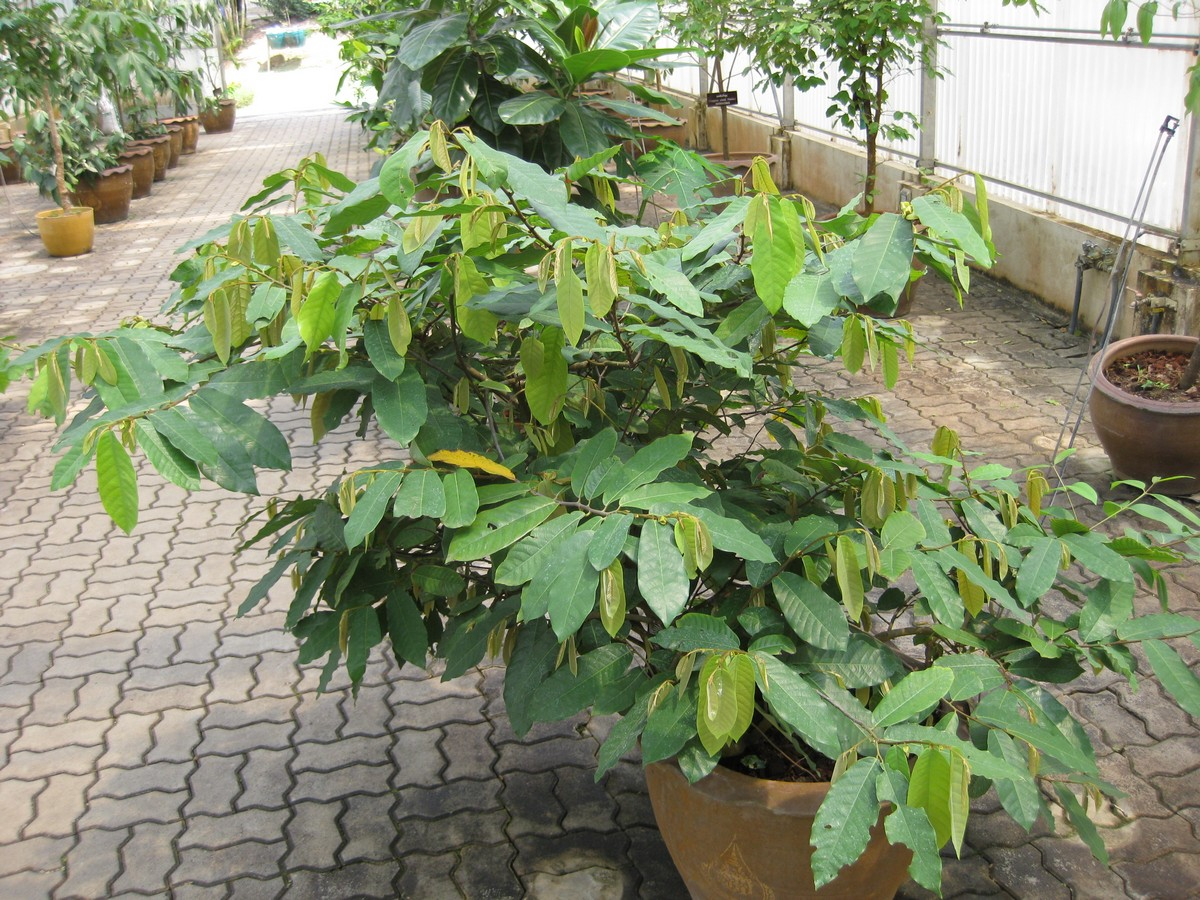
- Friesodielsia desmoides at the Queen Sirikit Botanic Garden

Scientific classification
- Kingdom: Plantae
- Clade: Tracheophytes
- Clade: Angiosperms
- Clade: Magnoliids
- Order: Magnoliales
- Family: Annonaceae
- Subfamily: Annonoideae
- Tribe: Uvarieae
- Genus: Friesodielsia; Steenis

Species
- See text

Synonyms
- Oxymitra (Blume) Hook.f. & Thomson; Schefferomitra (Note: Schefferomitra is represented by a single species, Schefferomitra subaequalis, found in New Guinea.) Diels

= Friesodielsia =

Genus of plants in the soursop family

Friesodielsia is a genus of flowering plants in the custard apple and soursop family Annonaceae, with all species found in the Old World, mostly in the tropics. A molecular study shows that Friesodielsia should be more narrowly circumscribed, with the only species remaining being the Asian ones, which can also be distinguished by their possession of globose or ellipsoid monocarps, and six petals per flower arranged in two whorls.

== Species ==
As of May 2026, Plants of the World Online accepted the following species:

- Friesodielsia affinis (Hook.f. & Thomson) D.Das
- Friesodielsia alpina (J.Sinclair) Steenis
- Friesodielsia auriculata (Elmer) Steenis
- Friesodielsia bakeri (Merr.) Steenis
- Friesodielsia betongensis Leerat.
- Friesodielsia biglandulosa (Blume) Steenis
- Friesodielsia borneensis (Miq.) Steenis
- Friesodielsia brevistipitata Leerat.
- Friesodielsia caesia (Miq.) Steenis
- Friesodielsia calycina (King) Steenis
- Friesodielsia chalermgliniana Leerat.
- Friesodielsia cuneiformis (Blume) Steenis
- Friesodielsia desmoides (Craib) Steenis
- Friesodielsia discolor (Craib) D.Das
- Friesodielsia excisa (Miq.) Steenis
- Friesodielsia ferralta Ezedin
- Friesodielsia filipes (Hook.f. & Thomson) Steenis
- Friesodielsia formosa I.M.Turner
- Friesodielsia fornicata (Roxb.) D.Das
- Friesodielsia glabra (Ridl.) D.M.Johnson
- Friesodielsia glauca (Hook.f. & Thomson) Steenis
- Friesodielsia grandifolia (Merr.) I.M.Turner
- Friesodielsia hainanensis Y.Tsiang & P.T.Li
- Friesodielsia hirta (Miq.) Steenis
- Friesodielsia khaoluangensis Leerat. & Aongyong
- Friesodielsia khoshooi Vasudeva Rao & Chakrab.
- Friesodielsia kingii (J.Sinclair) Steenis
- Friesodielsia korthalsiana (Miq.) Steenis
- Friesodielsia lagunensis (Elmer) Steenis
- Friesodielsia lalisae Damth., Baka & Chaowasku
- Friesodielsia lanceolata (Merr.) Steenis
- Friesodielsia latifolia (Hook.f. & Thomson) Steenis
- Friesodielsia longiflora (Merr.) Steenis
- Friesodielsia longipetala Leerat. & Chalermglin
- Friesodielsia maclellandii (Hook.f. & Thomson) D.Das
- Friesodielsia macrosepala Leerat. & Aongyong
- Friesodielsia mindorensis (Merr.) Steenis
- Friesodielsia obtusifolia (Elmer) Steenis
- Friesodielsia oligophlebia (Merr.) Steenis
- Friesodielsia ovalifolia (Ridl.) I.M.Turner
- Friesodielsia papuana Ezedin
- Friesodielsia parvimitra Satthaphorn & Leerat.
- Friesodielsia paucinervis (Merr.) Steenis
- Friesodielsia phanganensis Leerat.
- Friesodielsia philippinensis (Merr.) Steenis
- Friesodielsia platyphylla (Merr.) Steenis
- Friesodielsia pubescens (Merr.) Steenis
- Friesodielsia sahyadrica N.V.Page & Survesw.
- Friesodielsia songkhlaensis Leerat.
- Friesodielsia stenopetala (Hook.f. & Thomson) D.Das
- Friesodielsia subaequalis (Scheff.) R.M.K.Saunders, X.Guo & C.C.Tang
- Friesodielsia unonifolia (A.DC.) Steenis
- Friesodielsia yelaensis Ezedin
