= Were (surname) =

Were is the surname of the following people:

- Beatrice Were (born c.1966), Ugandan AIDS activist
- Charles Ong'ondo Were (died 2025), Kenyan politician
- David Were, Kenyan politician
- Edward Were (1846–1915), Church of England Anglican bishop
- Gideon Were (1934–1995), Kenyan historian, author, publisher, administrator and entrepreneur
- Jesse Were (born 1989), Kenyan football player
- Jonathan Binns Were (1809–1885), Australian politician
- Mary Esther Were, Kenyan beauty pageant titleholder
- Miriam Were (born 1940), Kenyan academic and public health advocate
- Mugabe Were (1968–2008), Kenyan legislator
- Paul Were (born 1991), Kenyan football player
- Robert Were Fox the Younger (1789–1877), British geologist, natural philosopher and inventor
- Robert Were Fox the Elder (1754–1818), English Quaker businessman
