= Whirl =

Whirl may refer to:

- Whirling, a dance genre
- Whirl (Transformers), a character in the Transformers franchise
- Tilt-A-Whirl, a type of amusement ride
- Atomic whirl, a symbol of atheism
- Whirl magazine, a luxury lifestyle magazine in Pittsburgh, PA
- Whirr (band), an American rock band that originally formed under the name Whirl

== See also ==
- Whirlpool
- Whorl
