= Wareing =

Wareing is a surname. Notable people with the surname include:

- Alan Wareing (born 1943), British television director
- Bob Wareing (1930–2015), British politician
- Garrett Wareing (born 2001), American actor
- Guy Wareing (1899–1918), British flying ace
- Herbert Wareing (1857–1918), British organist and composer
- Kierston Wareing (born 1978), British actress
- Lesley Wareing (1913–1988), British actress
- Marcus Wareing (born 1970), British celebrity chef
- William Wareing (1791–1865), British Catholic bishop

== See also ==
- Waering (surname)
- Waring (surname)
