= Hardware, Virginia =

Unincorporated community in Virginia, United States

Coordinates: 37°44′35″N 78°24′20″W

Hardware is an unincorporated community in Fluvanna County, in the U.S. state of Virginia.
