= Ware, Kentucky =

Ware
- Unincorporated community
- Location within the state of Kentucky Ware (the United States)
- Coordinates: 37°12′31″N 84°46′8″W
- Country: United States
- State: Kentucky
- County: Casey
- Elevation: 1,132 ft (345 m)
- Time zone: UTC-6 (Central (CST))
  - Summer (DST): UTC-5 (CST)
- GNIS feature ID: 509318

Ware is an unincorporated community in Casey County, Kentucky, United States. Its post office has ceased to exist.
