= Wair =

Wair may refer to:

- Wair, India, a locality in India
- Bir Wair, a location in the Libyan-Egyptian border region where parts of Operation Brevity took place, during the Second World War
- Thelma Mothershed-Wair (born 1940), a member of the Little Rock Nine
- a Gothic language word meaning man that could be found in the etymology of the modern English word werewolf
- A plank of wood two yards long and a foot broad.

WAIR may refer to:

- WAIR (FM), a Christian radio broadcasting from Lake City, Michigan
- Western Army Infantry Regiment, an elite JGSDF amphibious unit.
- WPOL, a radio station licensed to Winston-Salem, North Carolina which held the call sign WAIR from 1937 to 1987.
- WPAW, a radio station licensed to Greensboro, North Carolina which held the call sign WAIR-FM from 1947 to 1979
- Wing-assisted incline running, a theory to explain the flight evolution in birds
- a type of converted World War II British destroyers : see V and W-class destroyer#WAIR

== See also ==
- AirWair, the brand for the rubber soles of the Dr. Martens shoes
