= Hardware (surname) =

Hardware is an English occupational surname, for a dealer, from Middle English. It may refer to:

- Jamiel Hardware (born 1992), Jamaican footballer
- Richard Hardware (1950–1987), Jamaican sprinter
