= Trinelise Væring =

Danish singer-songwriter (born 1965)

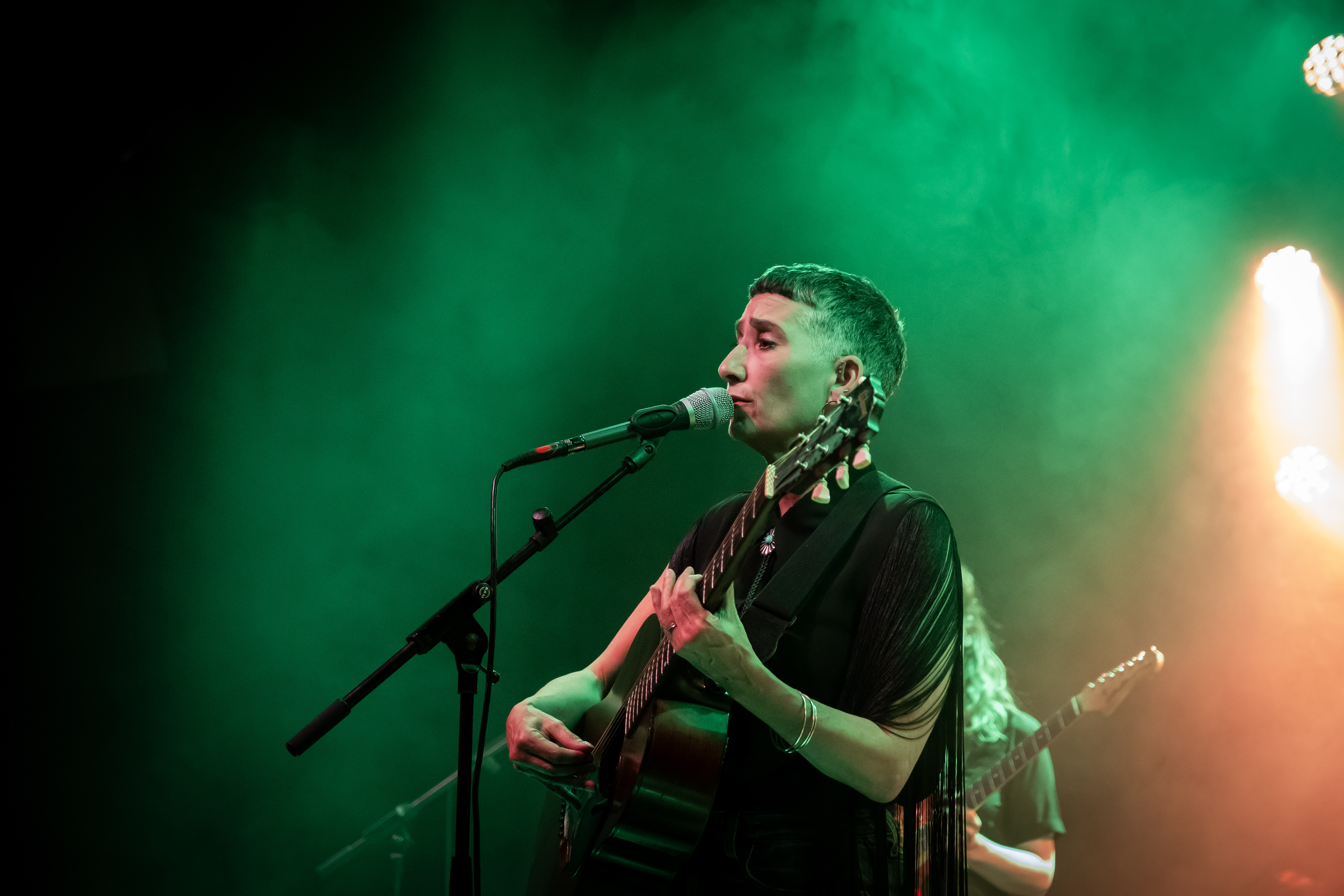
- Trinelise Væring live at Nordic Folk Alliance May 2024

Background information
- Born: July 2, 1965 (age 61); Denmark
- Genres: Alternative country, Nordicana, Americana, folk, roots, Jazz
- Occupation: Singer-songwriter
- Years active: 1992–present
- Labels: Storyville Records, Stunt Music, Yellowbird Records, Wordforword Records
- Member of: Tone of Voice Orchestra
- Website: vaering.com

Trinelise Væring (born July 2, 1965) is a Danish singer-songwriter, lyricist, guitarist and bandleader. She works in her native Danish as well as English. Over the course of her career she has explored several genres in collaborations as well as on her 7 solo releases.

== Music career ==
=== 1990s ===
Væring first gained acclaim as a jazz artist in the 1990s. She was widely praised by Scandinavian and German jazz critics, though she was often described as a non-typical jazz vocalist.

She debuted as a vocalist and lyricist on the album People, Place, Times & Faces (1993), recorded with an all-star Scandinavian 10-piece orchestra led by jazz saxophonist Fredrik Lundin. The album was nominated (1994) for a Danish Grammy Award as Jazz Album of the Year.

As a solo artist, she spent the 1990s touring and recording with some of the most respected Scandinavian jazz musicians, including Bobo Stenson, Mads Vinding, Alex Riel, and Carsten Dahl.

Between 1995 and 2000, she released three albums under her own name (When I Close My Eyes (1995), In So Many Words (1997), When the Dust Has Settled (2000)), featuring original material with English lyrics. The albums were orchestrated with a piano trio and additional instruments added through guest appearances.

When I Close My Eyes was widely recognized as a fresh and different approach to vocal jazz. Rather than performing standard tunes, Væring offered a singer-songwriter’s personal take on songwriting within a modern jazz setting.

For In So Many Words, Væring received an honorary end-of-year award from the Danish Arts Foundation and included in the end-of-year-list in Svenska Dagbladet.

In 1997, in a further collaboration with Lundin, she released Dos Mundos / Desde el Norte, on which she primarily sang in Spanish. This album included several interpretations of songs associated with the late Argentinian roots singer Mercedes Sosa.

=== 2000s ===
On Trespassing (2003), an art-rock-influenced album, Væring transitioned to a more pop- and rock-inspired style of songwriting. She also shifted the orchestration of her bands from the acoustic piano trio format to a more classic pop-rock setup, featuring electric guitar, bass, and drums.

In the mid-2000s, she composed an entirely new repertoire for herself, culminating in her first release in Danish, Lystfisker (2008), which she followed with Umanérlig (2011). Both albums received high praise in major Danish newspapers, earning acclaim from rock critics such as Klaus Lynggaard and Kim Skotte.

=== 2010s ===
As bandleader, writer and co-writer for Offpiste Gurus, Væring and Fredrik Lundin released two indie-jazz albums: Offpiste Gurus (2010) and In Case of Fire (2016). During these years, Væring was often referred to as a "Danish Rickie Lee Jones." The band toured Scandinavia and Northern Europe between 2000 and 2016.

As a solo artist, she released Umanérlig (2011), a follow-up to her 2008 album Lystfisker, again based on a guitar-driven rock trio format with lyrics in Danish.

As a bandleader, writer and co-writer, Væring collaborated with Finland-Swedish pianist Jonas Berg to create a song cycle for themselves and the Norwegian baroque ensemble Barokksolistene. This project premiered at the Wundergrund Festival in Copenhagen in 2010. Væring received another honorary end-of-year award from the Danish Arts Foundation for the Oh Purity song cycle, which was also the subject of a documentary, Oh Purity in Watching Landscapes, produced for Danish National Television DR-K. The songs were later released on the EP Oh Purity (2014).

In 2018, Væring released Du går ind ad en dør. The repertoire was originally written as a commission for a single performance at the festival Modern Jazz Days. The instrumentation for this project included Hammond organ and a horn section. The festival band subsequently became Væring’s new touring band, with which she toured across Denmark until the Covid pandemic brought performances to a halt.

=== 2020s to present day ===
In 2023, Væring released two singles in Danish, recorded with her pre-Covid band. Social media posts have hinted at a new album with this band.

As bandleaders, writers, and co-writers for the 10-piece Tone of Voice Orchestra, Væring and Fredrik Lundin had released the self-titled album Tone of Voice Orchestra (2022). This genre-bending fusion of their Scandinavian roots and roots music from other parts of the world received glowing reviews in print and online media from across the globe. The album won a Danish Jazz Award for Vocal Jazz Album of the Year, and earned three further nominations in roots categories (New Roots Artist of the Year, Roots Track of the Year, and Roots Composers of the Year). Additionally Væring and Lundin were nominated for a Carl Prisen award as Roots Composers of the Year.

In 2025 Tone of Voice Orchestra released their sophomore album Running from the Devil. The reception matched that of the debut album with equally glowing reviews from international roots medias, such as Roots Music Canada, Australian Rhythms, RootsTime Belgium and many more, again labelling Tone of Voice Orchestra as innovative, fresh, genre-bending and original.

As a solo artist, Væring released A Songwriter’s Odyssey in January 2025. The album was recorded with producer John Raham and local musicians in Vancouver, Canada.” A lead single, "I’m Not a Quitter", opened for airplay in North America, among other places. It was accompanied by the release of a video. Generally described as an alt-country or Americana album, A Songwriter’s Odyssey earned widespread praise. Americana UK gave the album an 8 out of 10 Score, Danish Gaffa and All That 5 out of 6 stars. Roots Music Canada gave the following description of the sound: “Sonically, A Songwriter’s Odyssey is a hybrid between the gritty, tough, relentlessly insistent music of Car Wheels on a Gravel Road-period Lucinda Williams and the lush and warmly drenched melancholic sweetness of KD Lang’s masterpiece Ingenue.”

The morning after the release Væring appeared on TV 2's Go’ morgen Danmark with a stripped version of “The Call”, a song Glide Magazine (US) called “an emotional journey through the artist’s touching approach to tradition”. The performance was followed by an interview.

The album charted as #19 on the Euro Americana Chart in March. The magazine's Pär Dahlerus had it on top of his year-end list of albums.

Also in 2025, Væring released a stand-alone single “HUNSTODDER", a punk-jazz-spokenword-rap song in her native Danish. According to her website this was a celebration of her upcoming 60th birthday, which was also duely noted via an interview in Dagbladet Politiken.

== Music-Related Activities Offstage ==
As a teacher: Væring has taught vocal, songwriting and ensemble classes at the Rhythmic Music Conservatory (Copenhagen), the Academy of Music and Dramatic Arts (Esbjerg) and the Malmö Academy of Music (Sweden).

As a debater: She has participated in public debates across various media on topics related to authors' rights and diversity in the music industry.

As a podcaster: In 2019–2020, she produced the podcast Værings Værksted. In 2024, she began hosting the podcast Værings Musiklytteri, released via Danish Radio Folk.

As a music journalist/critic: Væring is active as a music critic for Gaffa Magazine and has also written for Danish music media outlets such as Jazz Special, All That.. POV-International and side33.dk.

== Personal life ==
Væring grew up in Kokkedal, north of Copenhagen, as a happy adopted child of Danish parents, a topic she has spoken about publicly on several occasions.

In 1987 she married Danish jazz saxophonist and composer Fredrik Lundin. Together they have two children: Oskar Salvatore (born 1999) and Mercedes Jakobine (born 2003).

Education

In her 20s, she studied European Ethnology at the University of Copenhagen and Architecture at the Royal Danish Academy. From 1990 to 1991, she studied Jazz and Contemporary Music at the New School in New York.

She earned a Master’s degree in Professional Communication from Roskilde University in 2014.

== Discography ==
Studio album full length only

- 1993 – People, Place, Times & Faces with Fredrik Lundin +9 (lyricist, vocalist)
- 1995 – When I Close My Eyes with Væring/Stenson/Vinding/Riel (bandleader, singer-songwriter)
- 1997 – In So Many Words (bandleader, singer-songwriter)
- 1997 – Desde el Norte with Dos Mundos (w. Fredrik Lundin; bandleader, vocalist)
- 2000 – When the Dust Has Settled (bandleader, singer-songwriter)
- 2003 – Trespassing (bandleader, singer-songwriter)
- 2008 – Lystfisker (bandleader, singer-songwriter)
- 2010 – Offpiste Gurus with Offpiste Gurus (w. Fredrik Lundin; bandleader, vocalist, lyricist)
- 2011 – Umanérlig (bandleader, singer-songwriter)
- 2014 – Oh Purity EP and Concert/documentary “Oh Purity in Watching Landscapes” with Oh Purity (w. Jonas Berg; bandleader, singer-songwriter)
- 2016 – In Case of Fire with Offpiste Gurus (w. Fredrik Lundin; bandleader, singer-songwriter)
- 2018 – Du går ind ad en dør (bandleader, singer-songwriter)
- 2022 – Tone of Voice Orchestra with Tone of Voice Orchestra (w. Fredrik Lundin; bandleader, singer-songwriter)
- 2025 – A Songwriter’s Odyssey (bandleader, singer-songwriter)
- 2025 – Running from the Devil with Tone of Voice Orchestra (w. Fredrik Lundin; bandleader, singer-songwriter)

As featured artist

- 2008 – Sange featuring Trine-Lise Væring with the Crossover Ensemble. Poems by Paul la Cour
