= Silverware =

Silverware may refer to:

- Household silver including
  - Tableware, dishes used for serving or eating food
  - Cutlery, hand implements used for serving or eating food
  - Candlestick, a device used to hold a candle in place
- The work of a silversmith
- Silverware is also a slang term for a collection of trophies

== See also ==
- Tea set#Silver tea service
