= Waring =

Waring is an English surname with two derivation hypotheses: from the Frankish Warin, meaning 'guard,' via Norman French Guarin, or from the Anglo-Saxon Wæring, meaning 'confederate' or, more literally, 'oath companion.' Both hypotheses suggest that Wareing is a variant of this name. (Ware, as in the modern English aware and beware, is derived from the Anglo-Saxon waer.) Notable people with the surname include:

- Antonio J. Waring Jr. (1915–1964), American amateur archaeologist
- Amanda Waring, British actress, singer and campaigner, daughter of Derek
- Charles Waring (1827–1887), British politician and Liberal MP
- Charles E. Waring (1909–1981), American chemist and educator
- Derek Waring (1927–2007), British actor, father of Amanda
- Dorothy Grace Waring (1891–1977), English fascist campaigner and novelist
- Edward Waring (c. 1736–1798), British mathematician and eponym of Waring's Problem
- Eddie Waring (1910–1986), British sports commentator
- Edmund Waring (c. 1638–1687), British member of Parliament
- Elijah Waring (c. 1788–1857), Quaker and Anglo-Welsh writer
- Morton Waring (1783–1863), South Carolina US Marshall, proprietor of the largest individual sale of enslaved people in U.S. history
- Everett J. Waring (1859–ca. 1914), first African-American admitted to the Maryland State Bar Association and to try a case before the American Supreme Court
- Fred Waring (1900–1984), American bandleader who popularized the Waring blender
- George E. Waring, Jr. (1833–1898), American civic reformer
- Jack Waring (footballer) (1909–1991), English footballer
- Jane Rose Waring (c. 1819–1914), maiden name of Jane Roberts, First Lady of Liberia
- James Johnston Waring (1829–188), American physician
- James N. H. Waring (1861–1923), African-American educator, physician, and activist
- Joseph Frederick Waring (scholar) (1902–1972), American scholar
- Julius Waties Waring (1880–1968), United States District Judge, played important role in early legal battles of the American Civil Right Movement.
- Jim Waring (born 1967), American politician
- Laura Wheeler Waring (1887–1948), American artist
- Marilyn Waring (born 1952), New Zealand feminist
- Martha Gallaudet Waring (1873–1943), American educator, wife of Thomas Pinckney Waring
- Myfanwy Waring (born 1977), Welsh actress
- Richard Waring (1910–1983), British actor
- Richard Waring (writer) (1925–1994), British comedy writer
- Robert O. Waring (1919–1976), American diplomat assassinated by terrorists in Beirut in 1976
- Stephanie Waring (born 1978), English actress
- Thomas Pinckney Waring (1867–1943), American physician
- Tom Waring (1906–1980), British footballer
- William Herbert Waring (1885–1918), Welsh recipient of the Victoria Cross for his actions in World War I
- Will Waring, Canadian camera operator and television director

== See also ==
- Waering, a surname
- Wareing, a surname
- Wearing (surname)
