= Wearing (surname) =

Wearing is a surname, and may refer to:

- Alison Wearing (born 1967), Canadian writer
- Ben Wearing (born 1989), Australian football player
- Benny Wearing (1901–1968), Australian rugby league player
- Clive Wearing (born 1938), British musicologist
- Gillian Wearing (born 1963), English conceptual artist
- J. P. Wearing (born circa 1945), English-American author
- Michael Wearing (1939–2017), British television producer
- William Alfred Wearing (1816–1875) South Australian Supreme Court judge

== See also ==
- Waring
- Waering
