= Whorl =

Geometric pattern

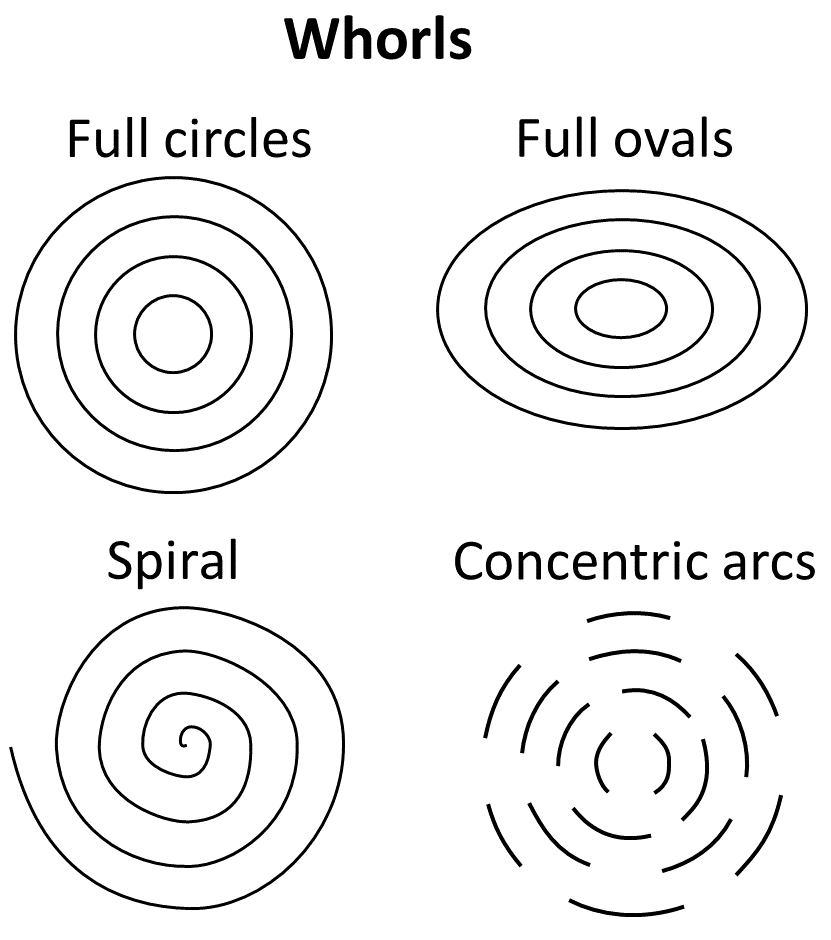
Main whorled patterns.

A whorl (/wɜːrl/ or /wɔːrl/) is an individual circle, oval, volution or equivalent in a whorled pattern, which consists of a spiral or multiple concentric objects (including circles, ovals and arcs).

== In nature ==
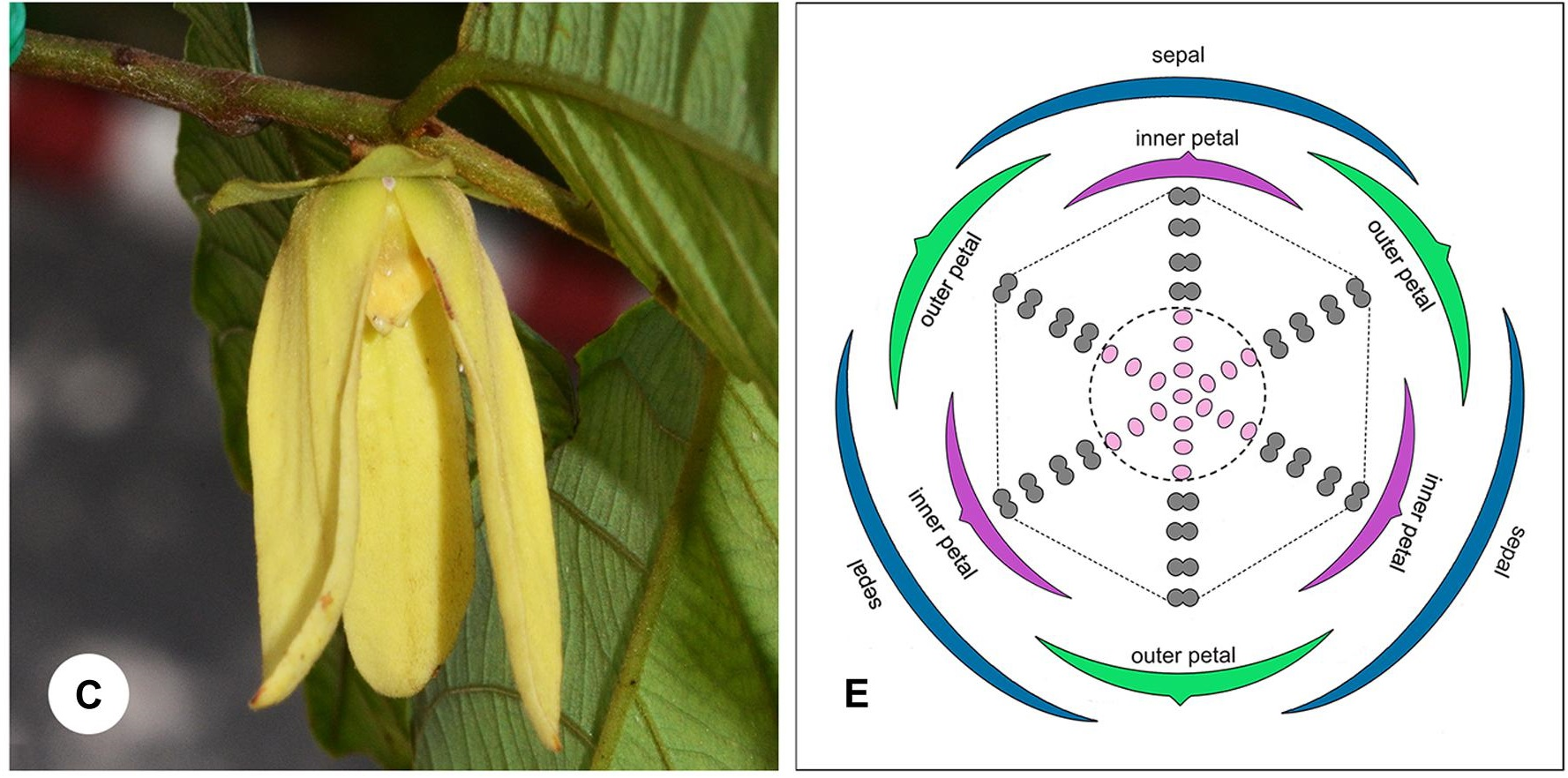
Botanical whorls: sepals, petals, leaves, or branches radiating from a single point (photo of flower of Friesodielsia desmoides, family Annonaceae, juxtaposed with diagram of axial cross-section)

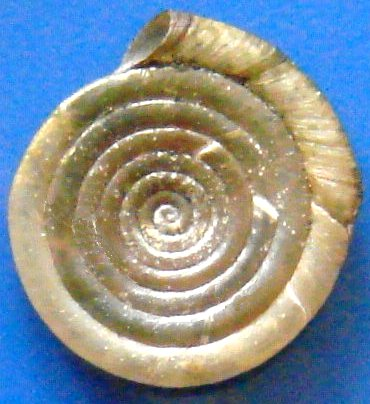
Mollusc whorls: Each complete 360° turn in the spiral growth of the shell of the mollusc Anisus septemgyratus, family Planorbidae.

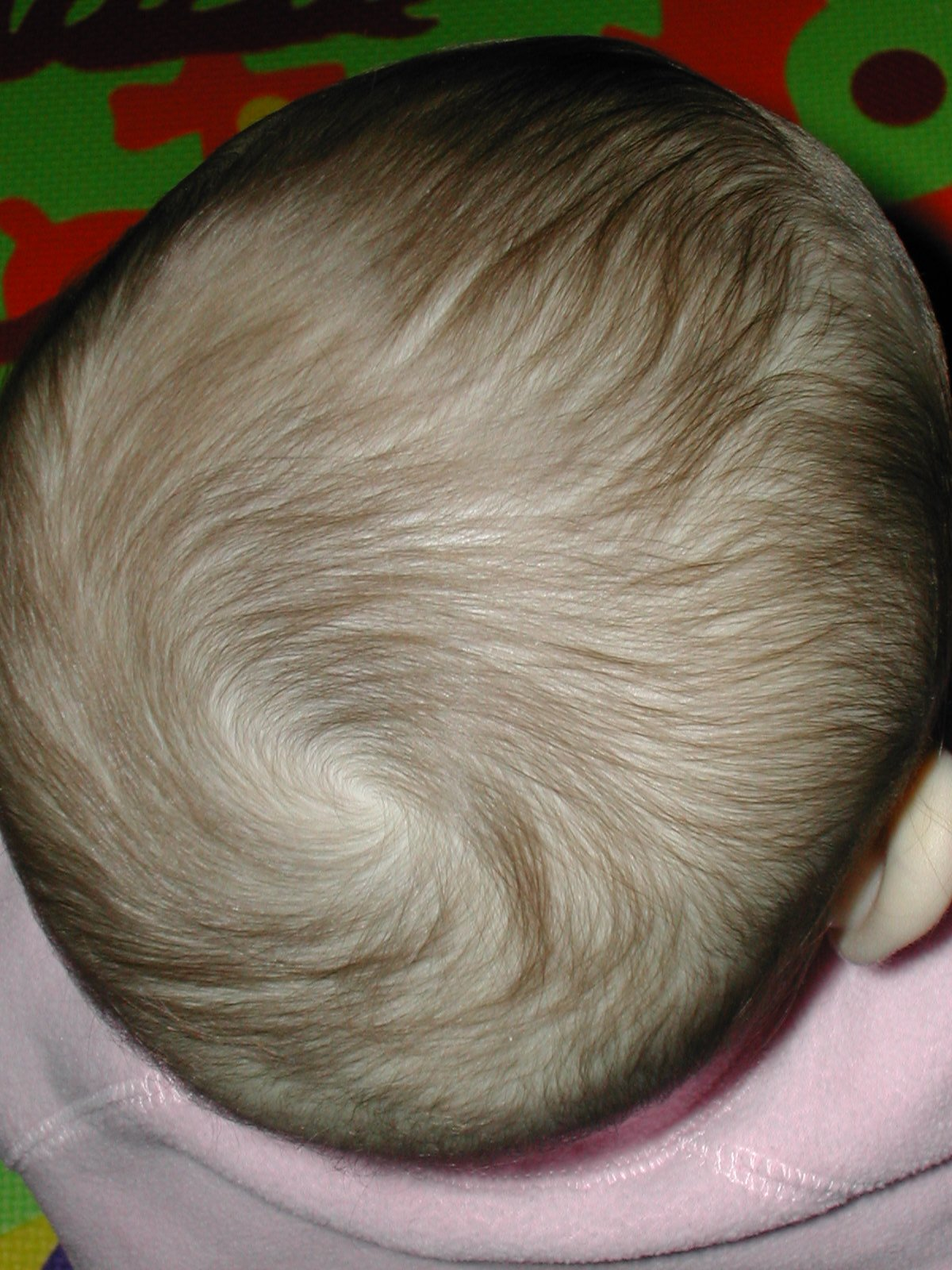
A hair whorl is a patch of hair growing in a circular direction around a visible center point.

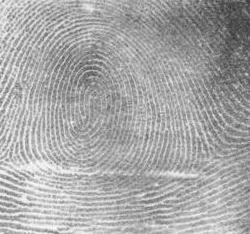
In a fingerprint, a whorl is each ridge arranged circularly around a central point on the finger.

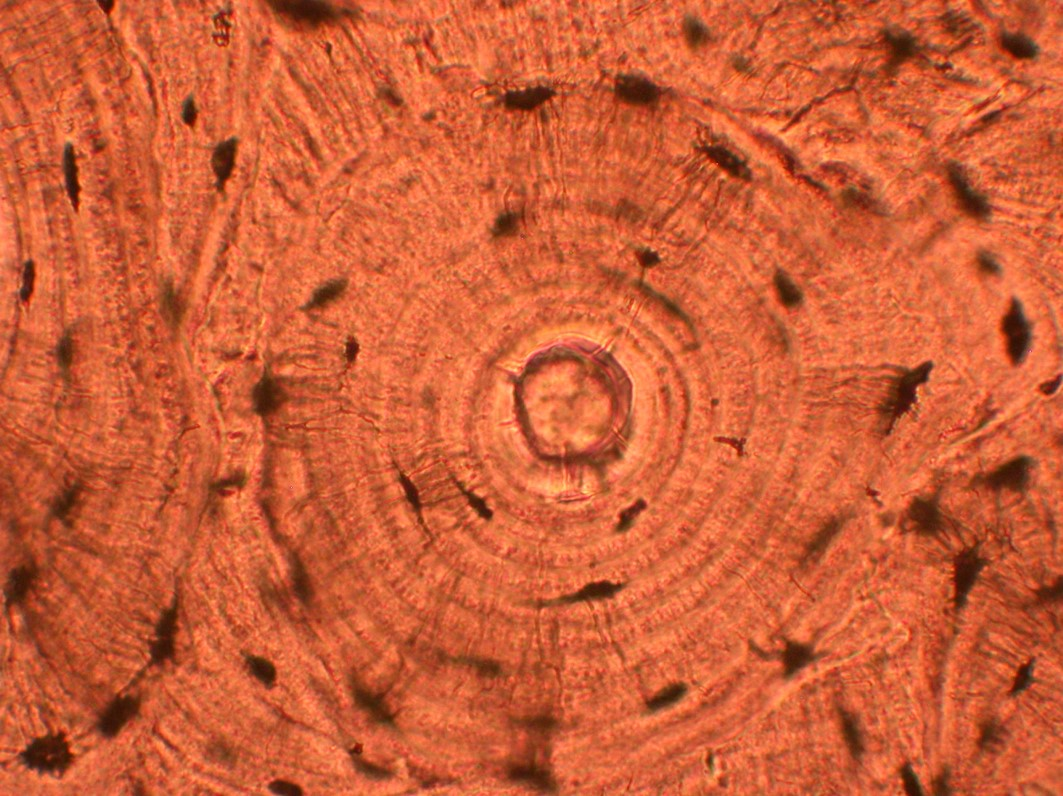
In histopathologic architecture, a whorled pattern consists of multiple concentric objects, or a spiral-shaped pattern. Bone tissue is shown.

For mollusc whorls, the body whorl in a mollusc shell is the most recently formed whorl of a spiral shell, terminating in the aperture.

== Artificial objects ==
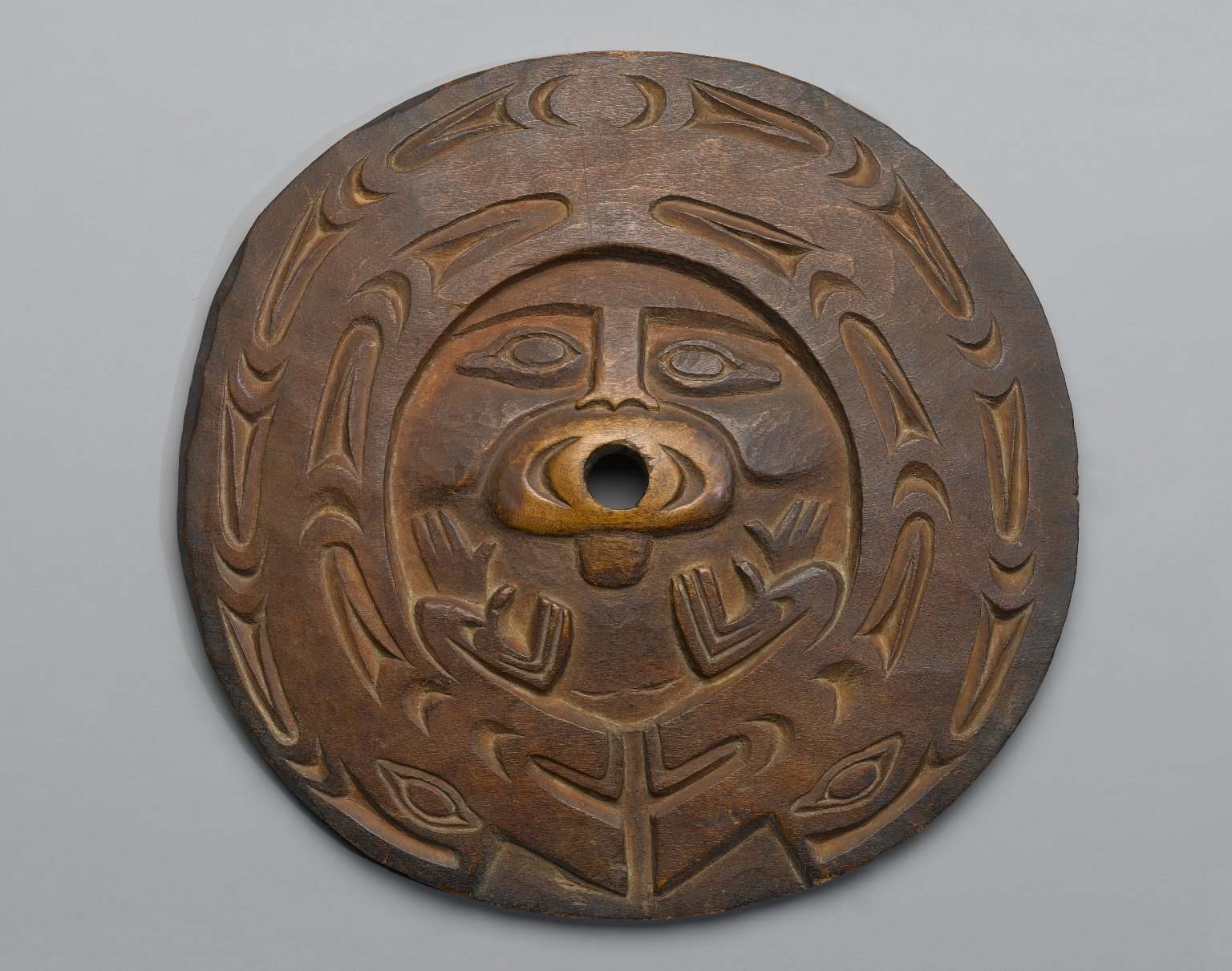
A spindle whorl is a disc or spherical object fitted onto the spindle to increase and maintain the speed of the spin.

== See also ==
- Whirl (disambiguation)
