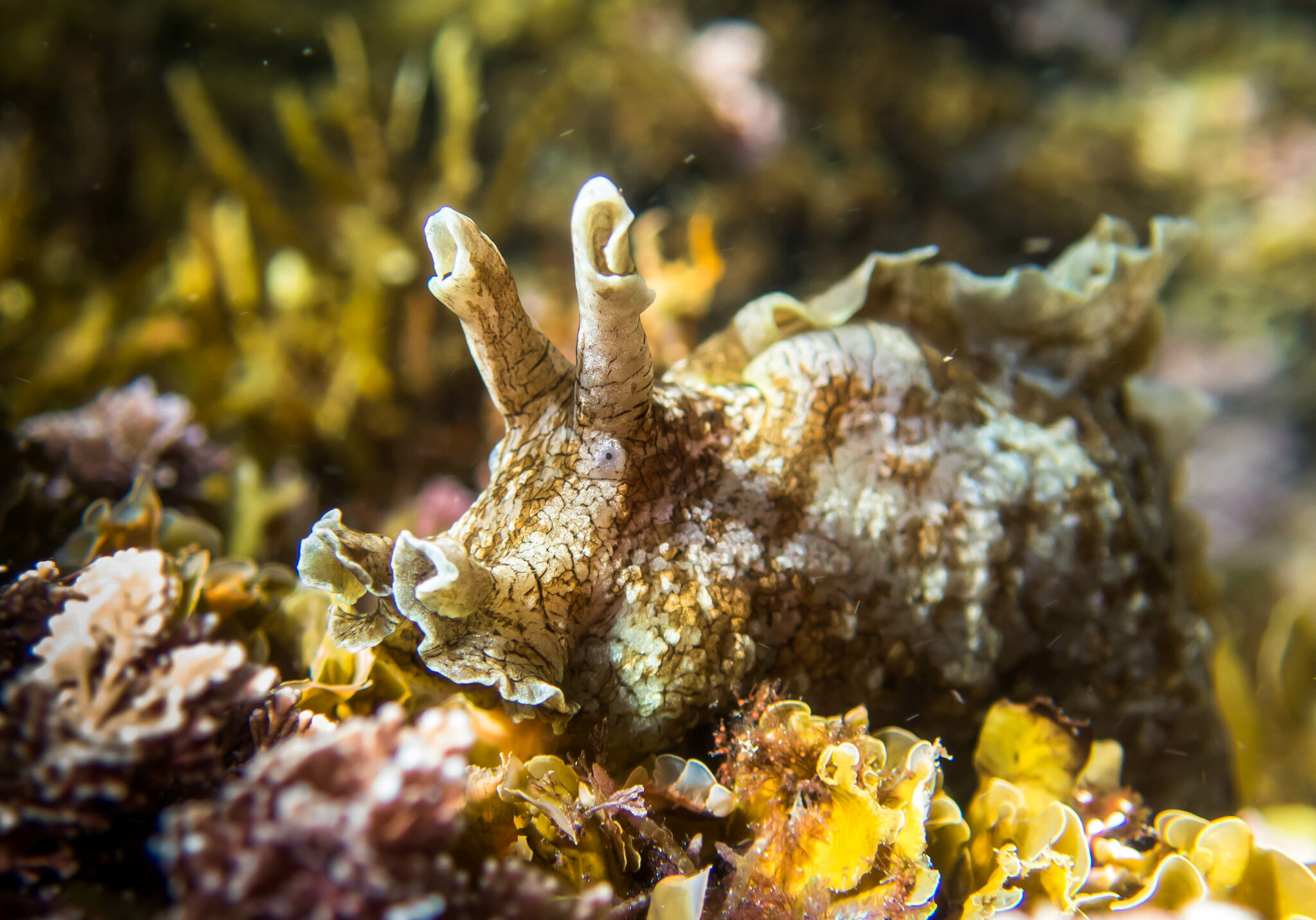
- Aplysia sydneyensis at Coogee

Scientific classification
- Kingdom: Animalia
- Phylum: Mollusca
- Class: Gastropoda
- Order: Aplysiida
- Family: Aplysiidae
- Genus: Aplysia
- Species: A. sydneyensis

Binomial name
- Aplysia sydneyensis G. B. Sowerby II, 1869

Synonyms
- Aplysia excavata G. B. Sowerby II, 1869

= Aplysia sydneyensis =

Species of gastropod

Aplysia sydneyensis, the sydney seahare is a species of gastropod mollusc in the genus Aplysia, family Aplysiidae. It is often found in the intertidal zone on the Australian coast.

== Description ==
The colour of the sydney seahare varies, and individuals can be near-black, brown, red or yellow. It is covered in spots that vary from off white to dark brown, and has a black lined pattern on the head and sides. The head is small, and the rhinophores are slender and close together. It grows to approx 150mm in length. When startled, this species can produce a cloud of dark purple ink.

Aplysia sydneyensis has a small, thin and flat shell, typically hidden by the parapodia (mantle flaps). Shell coloration is chestnut at the median region, becoming pale horn-colored toward the margins. The apex is obtuse, terminal, slightly reflected and incurved. The dorsal margin is convex; the upper margin is straight; the outer lip is straight; the lower margin is subquadrate.

== Life history ==
Copulation and egg-laying takes place between April through to June. A. sydneyensis feeds on algae such as Laurencia obtusa.

== Distribution ==
This marine species is endemic to Australia and occurs off New South Wales, Queensland, South Australia, Tasmania, Victoria and Western Australia.

== Gallery ==
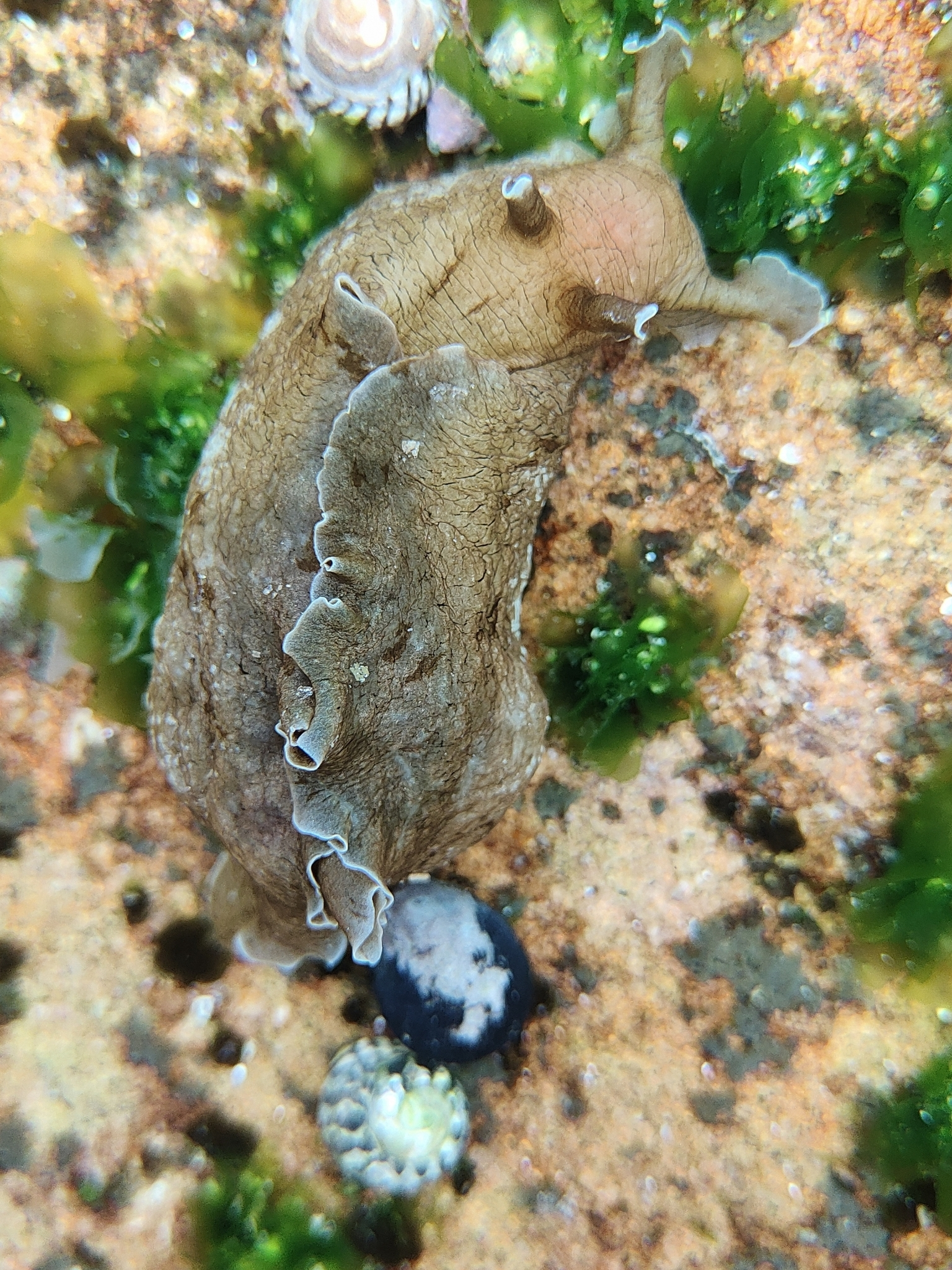
Sydney seahare showing yellow colouration

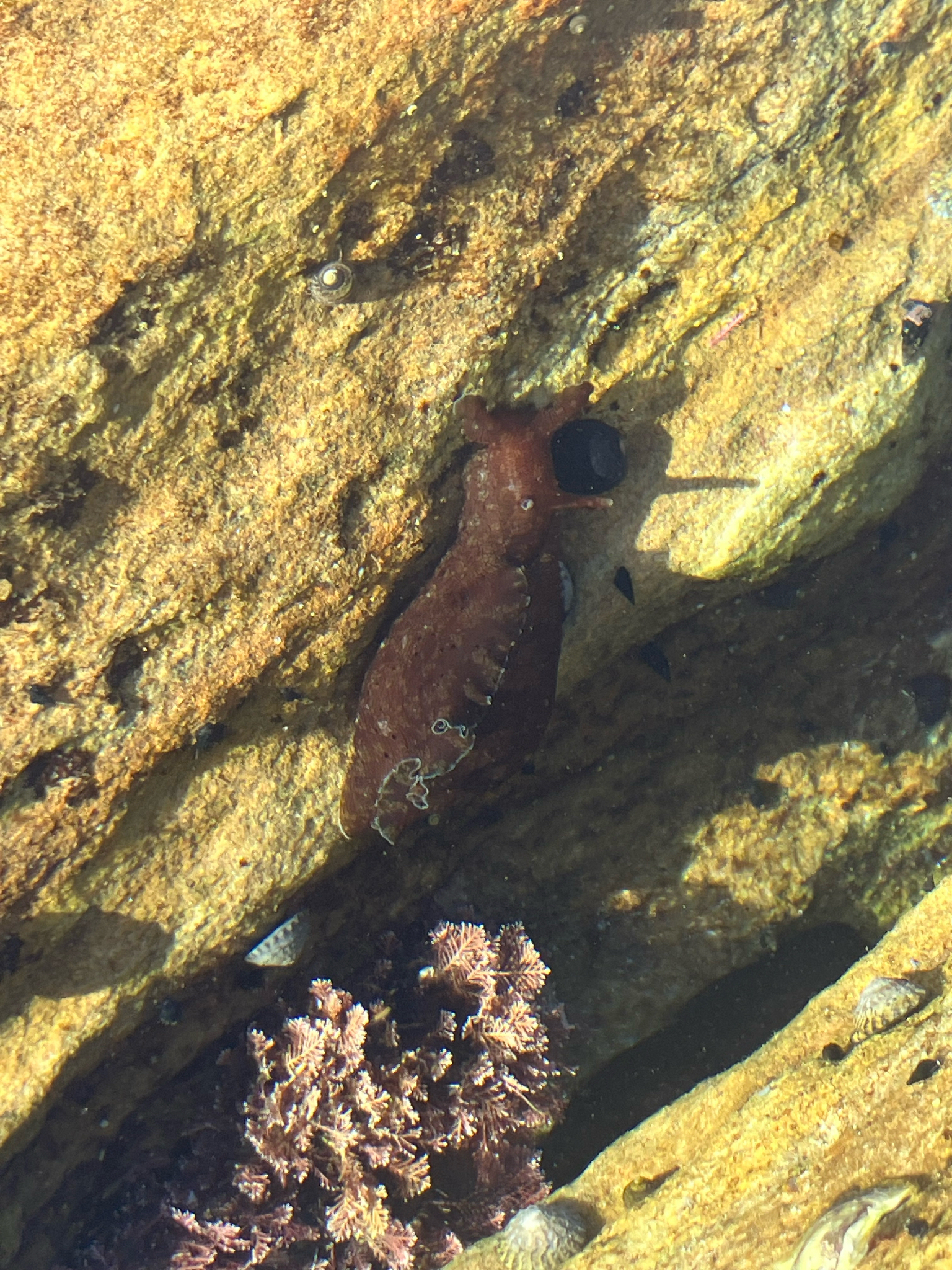
Red colouration

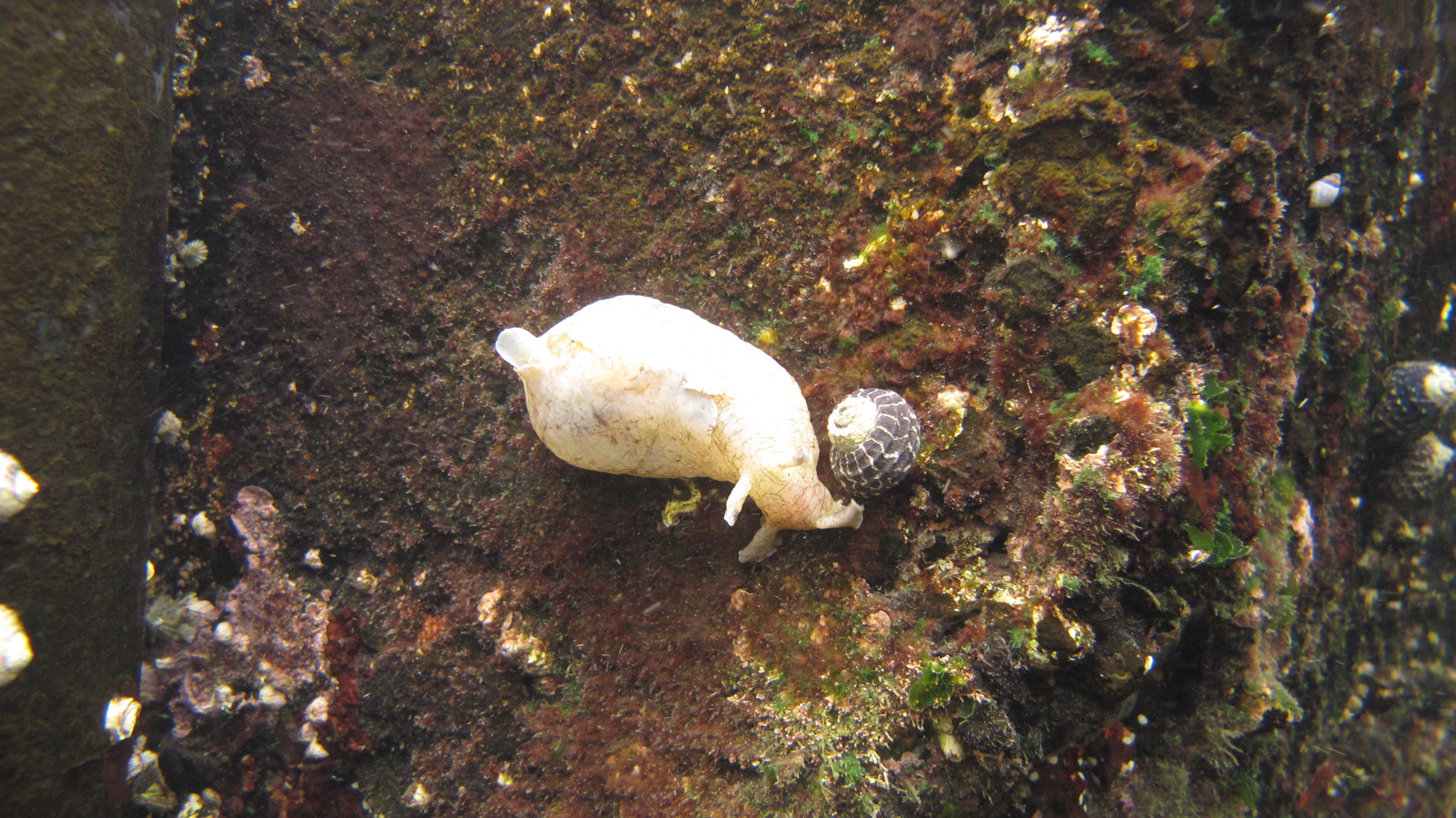
Pale coloration

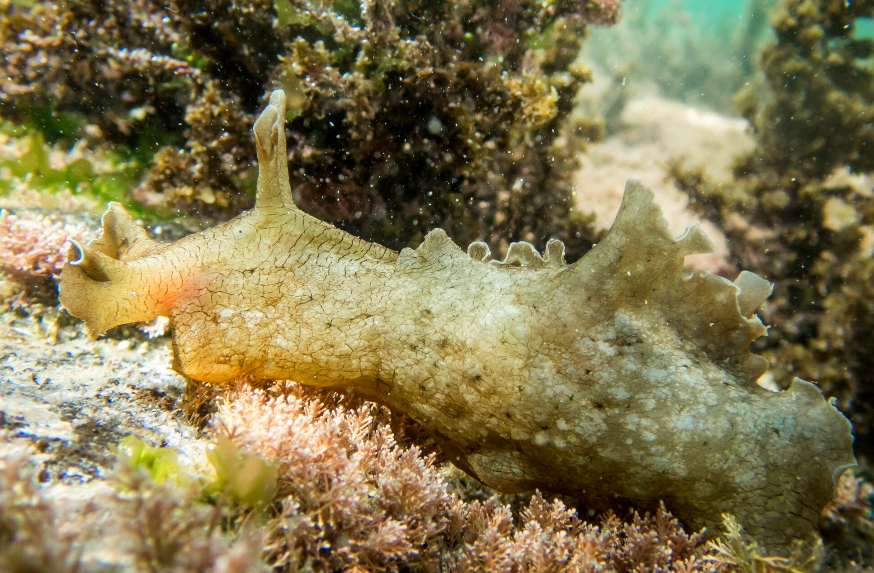
Lateral view
