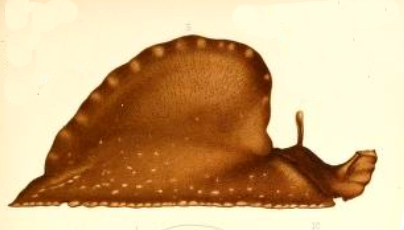
- Original depiction of Aplysia gilchristi (holotype)

Scientific classification
- Kingdom: Animalia
- Phylum: Mollusca
- Class: Gastropoda
- Order: Aplysiida
- Family: Aplysiidae
- Genus: Aplysia
- Species: A. gilchristi

Binomial name
- Aplysia gilchristi Bergh, 1907

= Aplysia gilchristi =

Species of gastropod

Aplysia gilchristi , the big-wing sea hare, is a very large species of sea slug, more specifically a sea hare, a marine opisthobranch gastropod mollusk in the family Aplysiidae, the sea hares.

== Description ==
(Original description) Holotype: The holotype was brown in color. The sides of its foot featured numerous small white spots and a distinct white border. The outer border of the foot-wings (parapodia) displayed larger white blotches and many fine black perpendicular lines on their exterior surface. This individual demonstrated dexterous swimming at a fair speed through the water.

A preserved, contracted specimen measured 65 cm in length. With its parapodia (foot-wings) raised, it reached a height of 3 cm and a breadth of 2.56 cm.

Head breadth (including 7 mm long tentacles): 2 cm

Rhinophore height: 6 mm

Mantle-shield length: 2.5 cm

Mantle-shield breadth: 2 cm

Sipho length: 1 cm

Foot sole breadth: 9 mm

Tail length: 8 mm

Foot-wings length: 4 cm (with an inside height of 1.7 cm)

The sole of the foot was blackish-brown with a whitish margin. The rest of the animal was dark brown, with rather elongate whitish spots on the sides of the body, some also present on the outer surface of the wings. A series of larger blotches ran along the wing margins. The inner surface of the wings was the same brown, with a few whitish spots towards the whitish mantle. The sipho had a somewhat brighter brownish color, adorned with scattered, roundish whitish spots.

The animal possessed large, rather flattened tentacles. The sole of the foot was not narrow, exhibiting distinct margins. The wings (parapodia) were high, meeting posteriorly and connecting with the tail. No aperture could be detected on the mantle. The somewhat grayish gill measured 22 mm in length, 10 mm in height, and 6 mm in thickness, with nearly half its length freely projecting. It comprised approximately 15 groups of lamellae.

Shell characteristics: The shell measured 2.3 cm in length, 2 cm in breadth, and approximately 0.5 cm in height. It was of a quite typical form, featuring a thin, calcified, and very fragile layer, along with a rather large cuticular margin.

Internal anatomy:

Sensory organs:The eyes had a diameter of approximately 1 mm.

Digestive system: The mouth tube was 3 mm long. The pharyngeal bulb was grayish, 9 mm long, with a height and breadth of 6 mm. The mandibular plates were notably larger, meeting dorsally and ventrally, measuring 4.5 mm high by 2.25 mm broad. Their entire anterior half was blackish-brown, while the remainder was yellowish. Their staff-shaped elements were at least 0.2 mm high, with a diameter of 0.016 mm at the slightly thickened upper end.

The gray palate was as usual, its plates bearing typical thin hooks, reaching a height of at least 0.2 mm. The brownish-yellow radula of the broad tongue contained approximately 36 series of plates, with an additional 10 series in the short and thick sheath, totaling 46 series. Each series contained up to 33 plates. The plates in the thicker parts were yellow. The median plate measured 0.28 mm in breadth. The four outermost plates measured 0.08 mm, 0.12 mm, 0.18 mm, and 0.25 mm respectively, with their length then increasing to 0.35 mm by a height of 0.24 mm.

The median plate was not broad, featuring a finely denticulated hook and two denticles at its base. The two outermost plates lacked a hook. The subsequent plate possessed a small, single hook. The following plates had a denticulated hook. Other plates were of the usual form, with a pointed, finely denticulated hook and a stronger denticle towards its base, or (on the outside) with 2–4 denticles. The long, thin, white salivary glands were as usual. The black esophagus was 10 mm long by 1.25 mm broad. The first stomach was nearly colorless, 14 mm long by 10 mm diameter, and empty.

The masticatory stomach, brownish-gray, was 8 mm long by 6 mm diameter. It featured two series of rather low thorns before the cardia. The facets of the stomach were as usual, with 8 larger and approximately 6 smaller plates. The larger plates were of similar size, 3–5 mm high, and dirty yellow, while the smaller ones were paler and less regularly pyramidal. The third stomach measured 5 mm in both length and breadth, notably lacking facets.

Hepatic system: The brownish-gray conical liver was 14 mm long with an overall diameter of 9 mm. The end of the long (approximately 4 mm) gallbladder projected freely on the surface of the liver.

Reproductive system: The yellow hermaphrodite gland covered the posterior end and the postero-superior side of the liver, forming a layer 4 mm thick, 8 mm long, and 7 mm broad; its duct was long and robust. The yellowish-white and grayish anterior genital mass appeared as usual. The grayish, globular spermatotheca had a diameter of 6 mm. The brownish-gray penis was 11 mm long with a diameter of 2.25 mm, appearing nearly cylindrical. The inner surface of the presputium (sheath or covering that encloses the penis when it is retracted) exhibited strong blackish longitudinal folds. The white glans was 7 mm long, very pointed, somewhat twisted, and featured a rather deep furrow.

== Distribution ==
This marine species occurs off False Bay, South Africa.
