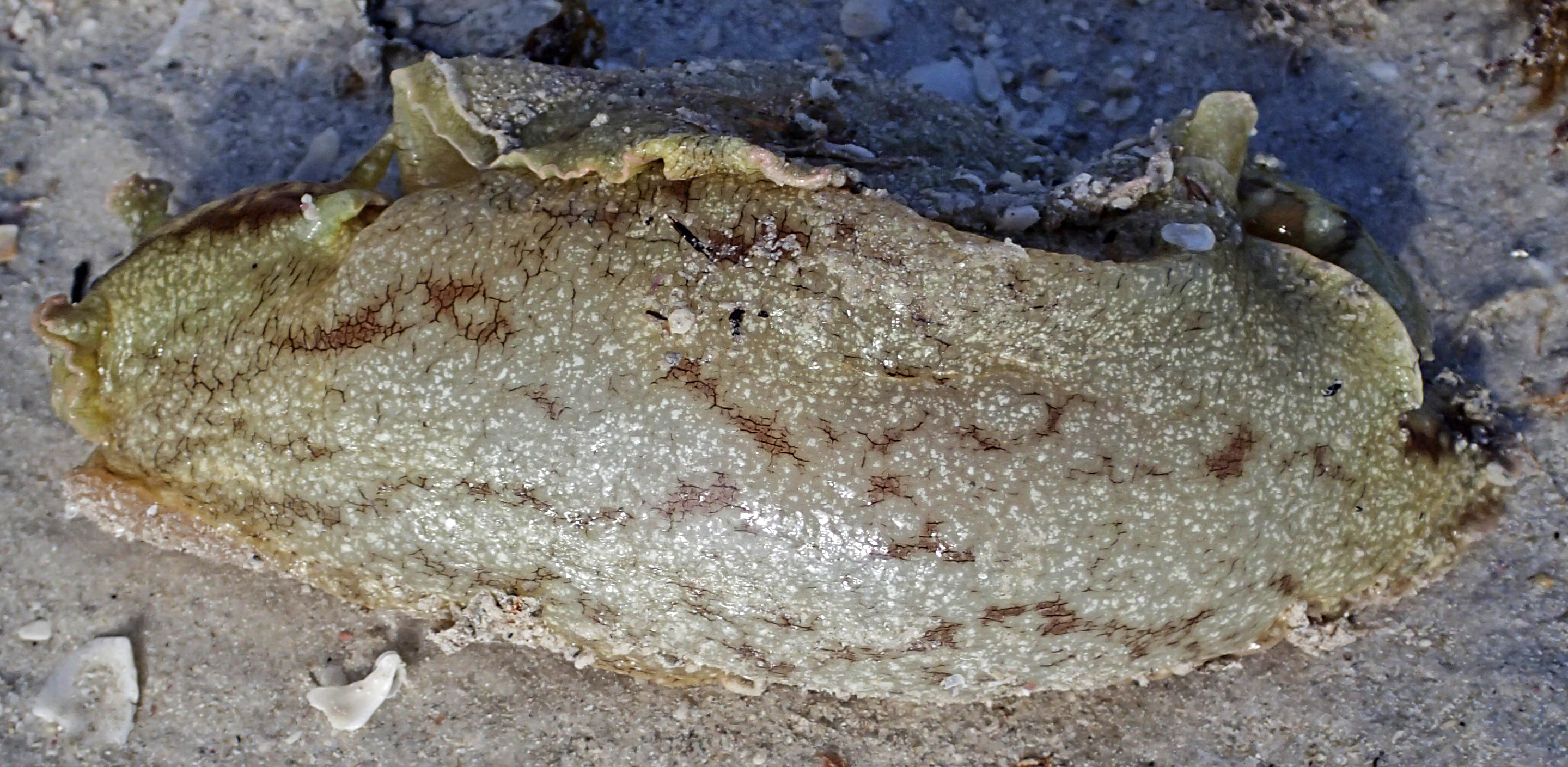
- Live specimen of Aplysia brasiliana

Scientific classification
- Kingdom: Animalia
- Phylum: Mollusca
- Class: Gastropoda
- Order: Aplysiida
- Family: Aplysiidae
- Genus: Aplysia
- Species: A. brasiliana

Binomial name
- Aplysia brasiliana Rang, 1828

Synonyms
- Aplysia guadaloupensis G. B. Sowerby I, 1869 junior subjective synonym; Aplysia livida A. d'Orbigny, 1836 junior subjective synonym

= Aplysia brasiliana =

Species of gastropod

Aplysia brasiliana, common name the mottled sea hare, is a species of gastropod mollusc in the genus Aplysia, family Aplysiidae.

== Description ==
(Original description in French) Aplysia brasiliana is immediately distinguishable from other species by two rather remarkable characteristics. Firstly, while the anterior part of the animal is quite elongated, its posterior part appears somewhat short in contrast. Secondly, the operculum is situated further back, consequently sloping towards the tail.

In addition to these features, the mantle is noted for its dark brown coloration. The posterior tentacles are perfectly conical, in stark contrast to the others, which are very broad. The animal's lobes are vast and elongated, and the operculum itself is quite large.

The shell is equally distinctive: it possesses an oblong shape and a dark yellow hue. Its ventral surface is covered by a rather thick calcareous layer. The apex is poorly formed, and any indentation is nearly absent.

== Distribution ==
This species occurs in the Caribbean Sea and in the Atlantic Ocean off Brazil.
