= Aplysia ghanimii =

Scientific classification
- Kingdom: Animalia
- Phylum: Mollusca
- Class: Gastropoda
- Order: Aplysiida
- Family: Aplysiidae
- Genus: Aplysia
- Species: A. ghanimii

Binomial name
- Aplysia ghanimii Golestani, Crocetta, Padula, Camacho-García, Langeneck, Poursanidis, Pola, Yokeş, Cervera, D.-W. Jung, Gosliner, Araya, Hooker, Schrödl & Á. Valdés, 2019

Species of gastropod

Aplysia ghanimii is a very large species of sea slug, more specifically a sea hare, a marine opisthobranch gastropod mollusk in the family Aplysiidae, the sea hares.

== Distribution ==
This marine species occurs off The Bahamas.
