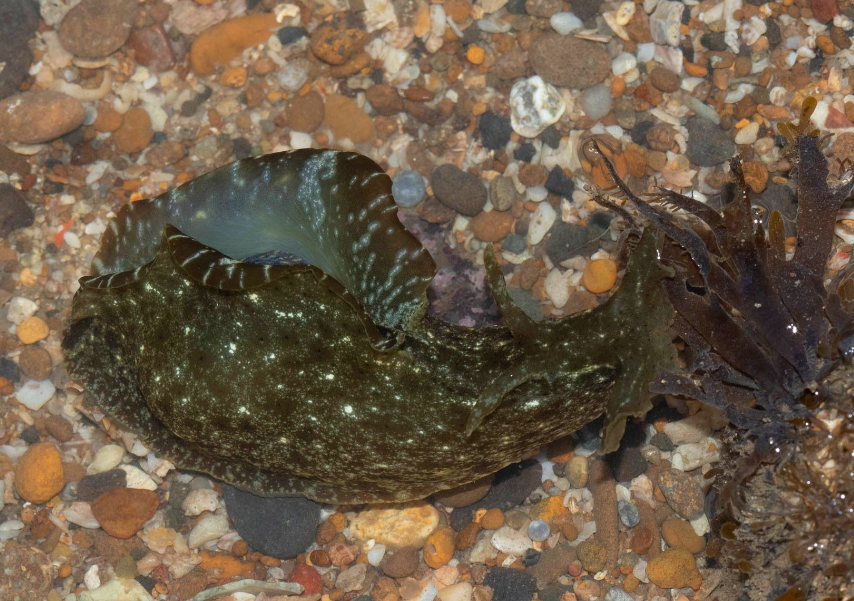
- Live specimen of Aplysia rudmani

Scientific classification
- Kingdom: Animalia
- Phylum: Mollusca
- Class: Gastropoda
- Order: Aplysiida
- Family: Aplysiidae
- Genus: Aplysia
- Species: A. rudmani

Binomial name
- Aplysia rudmani Bebbington, 1974

= Aplysia rudmani =

Species of gastropod

Aplysia rudmani is a species of gastropod mollusc in the genus Aplysia, family Aplysiidae.

== Distribution ==
This marine species occurs off India.
