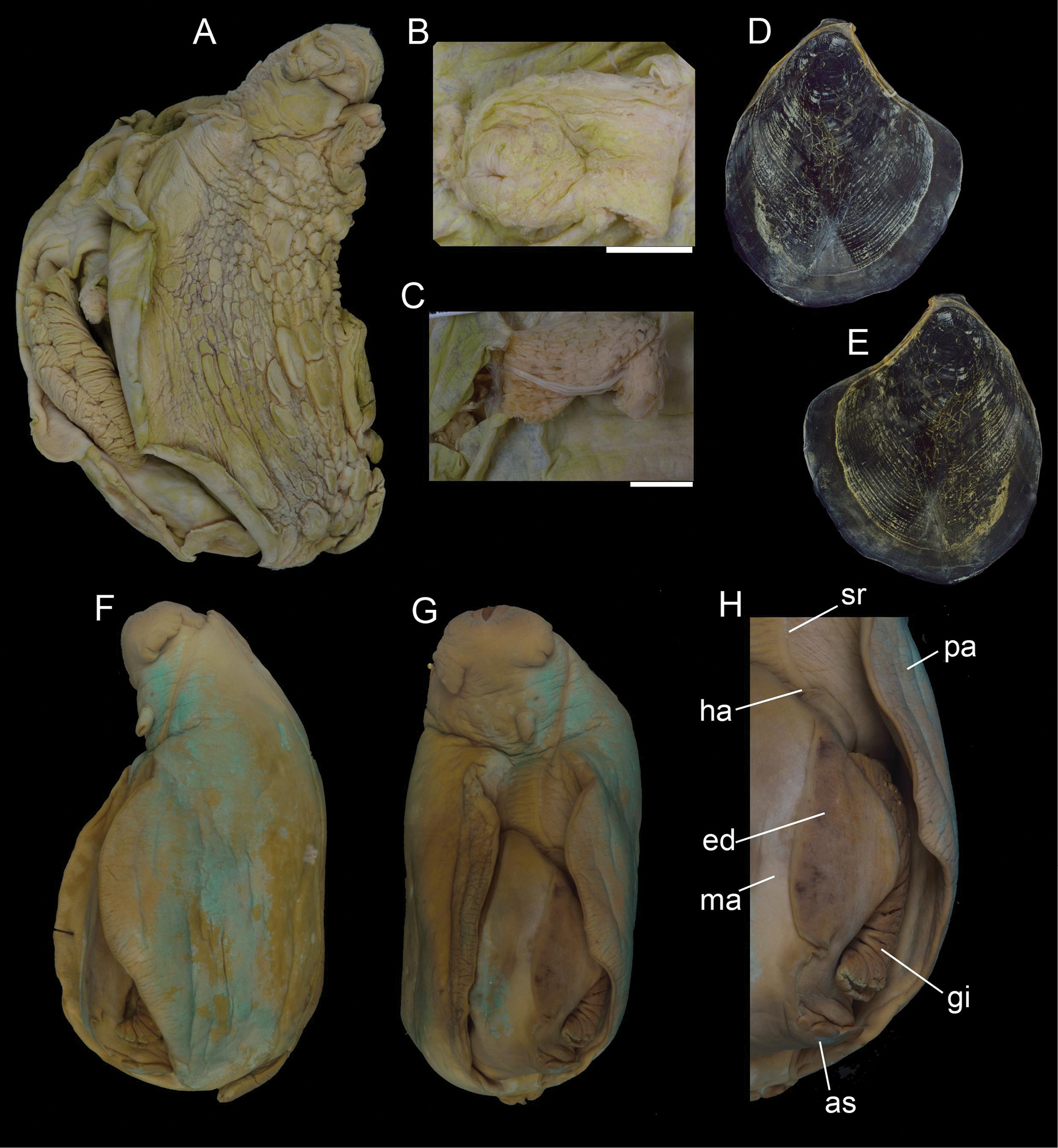
- specimen of Aplysia pulmonica (F - H)

Scientific classification
- Kingdom: Animalia
- Phylum: Mollusca
- Class: Gastropoda
- Order: Aplysiida
- Family: Aplysiidae
- Genus: Aplysia
- Species: A. pulmonica

Binomial name
- Aplysia pulmonica A. Gould, 1852

Synonyms
- Tethys pulmonica (Gould, 1852); Tethys pulmonica var. tryoniana Pilsbry, 1895

= Aplysia pulmonica =

Species of gastropod

Aplysia pulmonica is a species of gastropod mollusc in the genus Aplysia, family Aplysiidae.

== Description ==
The length of the species attains 58 mm.

(Original description) This animal exhibits an oblong body form, distinctly sacciform posteriorly, where the foot extends into a short, clear caudal prolongation. The striking bronze-green coloration is coarsely reticulated with dark veins. A small siphonal aperture is present. The head is obtuse and subtly bilobate. Anterior tentacles are short and ear-shaped, contrasting with the acutely conical, faintly annulate cervical tentacles.

== Distribution ==
This marine species occurs off Samoa, Pacific Ocean.
