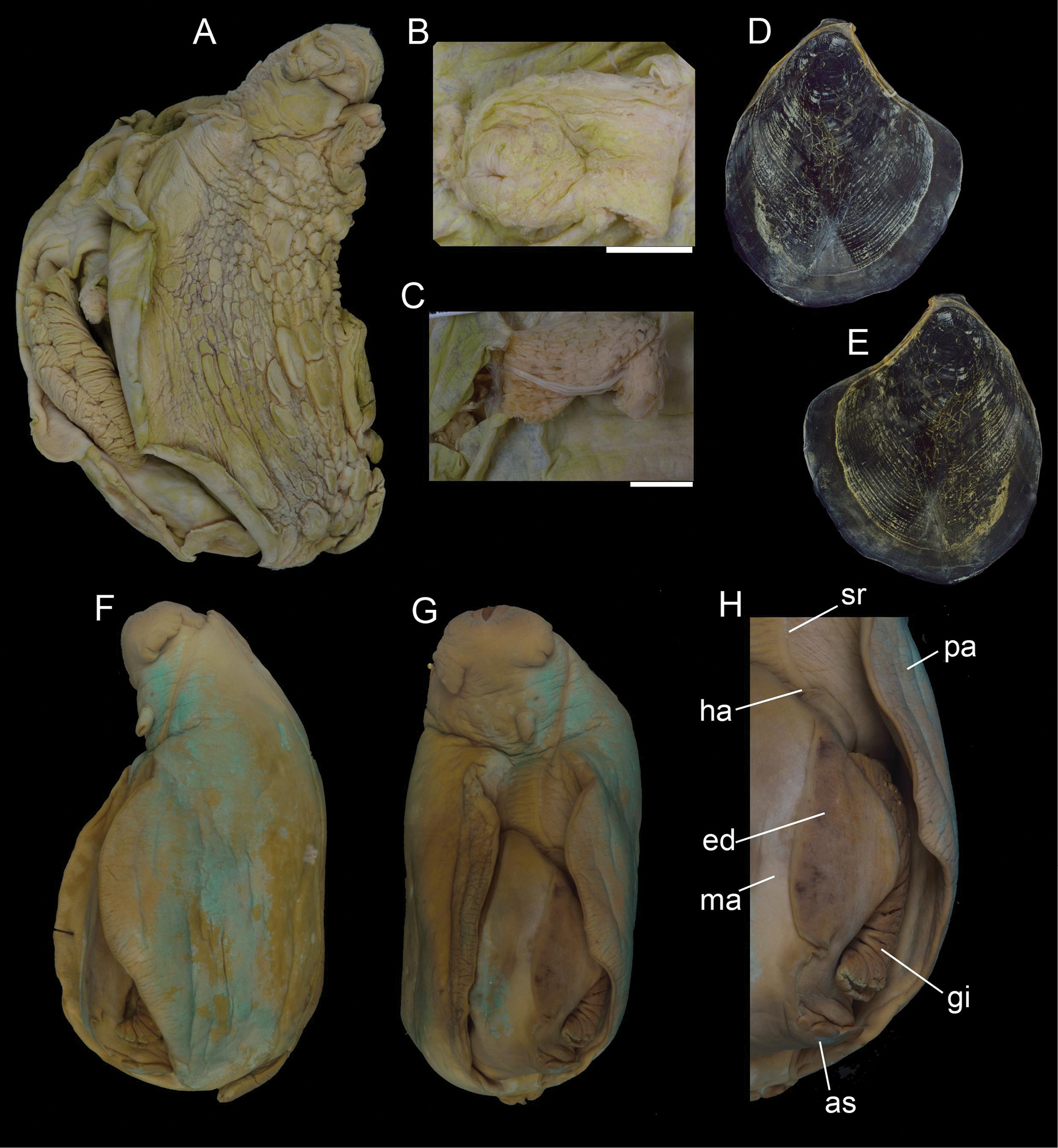
- specimen of Aplysia pilsbryi (F - H)

Scientific classification
- Kingdom: Animalia
- Phylum: Mollusca
- Class: Gastropoda
- Order: Aplysiida
- Family: Aplysiidae
- Genus: Aplysia
- Species: A. pilsbryi

Binomial name
- Aplysia pilsbryi (Letson, 1898)

Synonyms
- Tethys pilsbryi Letson, 1898

= Aplysia pilsbryi =

Species of gastropod

Aplysia pilsbryi is a species of gastropod mollusc in the genus Aplysia, family Aplysiidae.

== Description ==
The length of the species attains 97 mm.

(Original description) The body is elongated, flabby, and plump, becoming noticeably enlarged toward the rear. The mouth is encircled by wide lips and large buccal appendages. The rhinophores (the posterior tentacles) are stout and short-conic, featuring slits at their extremities, while the eyes are small, black, and positioned just before the rhinophores.

The anterior ends of the pleuropodial lobes are well separated, though their posterior ends join together behind. The mantle is large and contains a very small median perforation surrounded by radial striae, which are visible only under a lens. The right margin of the mantle is folded over about half its width and is largely adnate (fused); it does not form an excurrent siphon at the posterior.

The gill is considerably exposed. The genital opening is located under the forward right border of the mantle and is surmounted by a fleshy prominence. The opening of the opaline gland is large and single, situated about 13 mm behind the genital pore and well underneath the gill. The gills themselves are foliated in regular branches. The external integument is smooth, marked only by a few inconspicuous, scattered warts; it is olive-colored with some black clouding on the reflexed mantle and occasionally near the tail. The shell remains normal in form.

== Distribution ==
This marine species occurs off Yucatán, Mexico.
