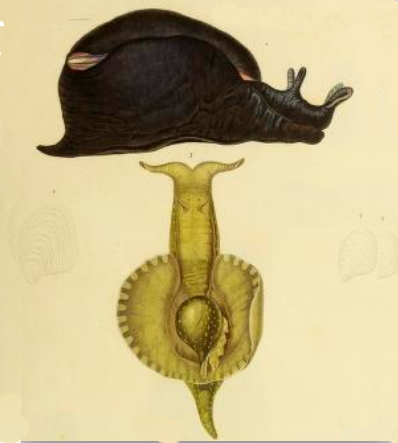
- Aplysia nigra (holotype)

Scientific classification
- Kingdom: Animalia
- Phylum: Mollusca
- Class: Gastropoda
- Order: Aplysiida
- Family: Aplysiidae
- Genus: Aplysia
- Species: A. nigra

Binomial name
- Aplysia nigra A. d'Orbigny, 1836

Synonyms
- Aplysia (Aplysia) nigra A. d'Orbigny, 1836 alternative representation; Aplysia rangiana A. d'Orbigny, 1836 junior subjective synonym

= Aplysia nigra =

Species of gastropod

Aplysia nigra is a species of sea hare or sea slug, a marine opisthobranch gastropod mollusk in the family Aplysiidae.

== Description ==
The length of the species attains 25 cm.

(Original description in French) The animal is shortened, very elevated, coriaceous (leathery), strongly rugose (wrinkled), and notably ventricose (swollen). Its cephalic (head) region is short, broad, and supported by a very short neck. The buccal appendages are broad, rather short, slightly flattened, and rolled upon themselves at their extremities. The tentacles are thick, somewhat short, very obtuse, and cleft at their tips. The mouth lacks prominent lips (bourrelets) and is situated in the furrow separating the two buccal appendages.

The foot is very broad, strongly rugose, thick, truncated anteriorly, widened in its middle section, and short and subacuminate posteriorly. The foot lobes are not very broad, united posteriorly for half their length, forming a wide cavity where the gills are located. Only a very short anterior portion of these lobes is free, and they are so short that they can scarcely aid in crawling (reptation).

The mantle is very large, partly concealed by the bridle (bride) of the foot lobes. It is rounded in form and marked by a very small, round, superior, and median opening. Its morphology diverges from all previously described Aplysia species: specifically, the posterior part, instead of possessing a tongue-like extension of the shell's protective membrane, is excavated and equipped with a semicircular, perpendicularly elevated, membranous furrow that corresponds to the shell's indentation. The gills are entirely hidden by the mantle and the posterior bridle of the foot lobes.

The shell is oval, very open, and depressed, marked by growth lines and divergent striae extending from the apex to the margins. Its indentation is broad and shallow. The apex is slightly oblique and very lightly encrusted.

The animal is a deep black, particularly on the underside of the foot and its lobes. The inner surfaces of the lobes are slightly rosy. The shell is amber-colored.

== Distribution ==
This species occurs in the Pacific Ocean off Peru and Ecuador.
