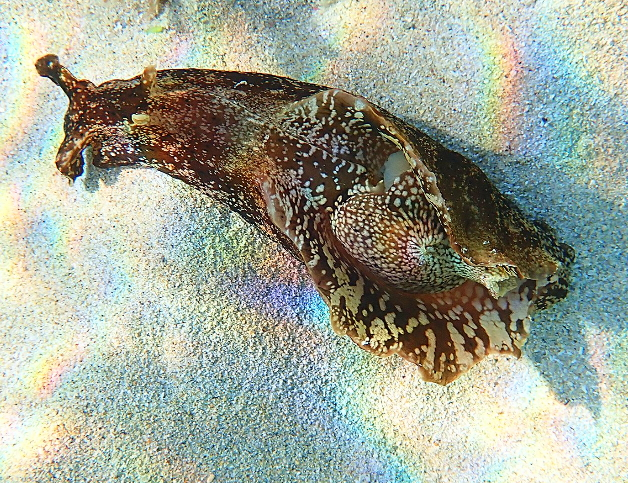
- Live specimen of Aplysia reticulata

Scientific classification
- Kingdom: Animalia
- Phylum: Mollusca
- Class: Gastropoda
- Order: Aplysiida
- Family: Aplysiidae
- Genus: Aplysia
- Species: A. reticulata

Binomial name
- Aplysia reticulata Eales, 1960

Synonyms
- Aplysia (Varria) reticulata Eales, 1960

= Aplysia reticulata =

Species of gastropod

Aplysia reticulata is a species of gastropod mollusc in the genus Aplysia, family Aplysiidae.

== Description ==
The length of the species attains 44 mm. It is 25 mm wide and 29 mm high.

== Distribution ==
This marine species is endemic to Australia and occurs off Queensland and Western Australia.
