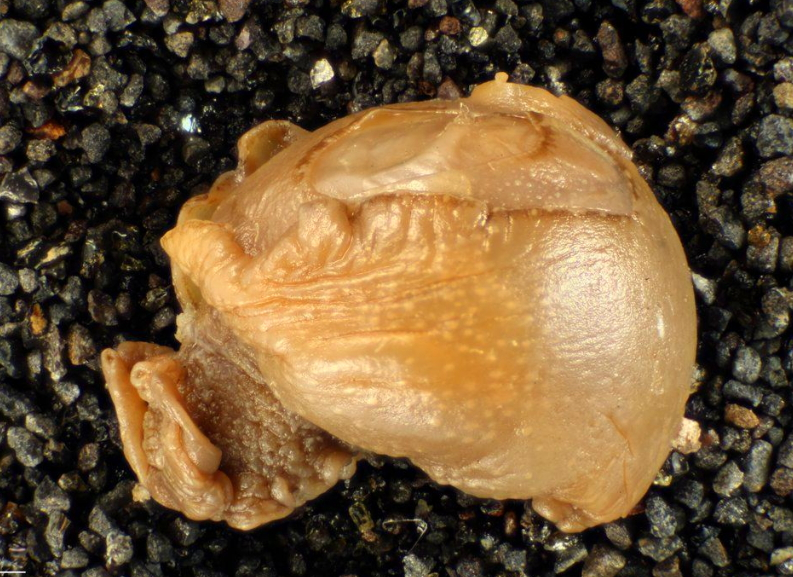
- Aplysia juanina (syntype at the Natural History Museum of Denmark)

Scientific classification
- Kingdom: Animalia
- Phylum: Mollusca
- Class: Gastropoda
- Order: Aplysiida
- Family: Aplysiidae
- Genus: Aplysia
- Species: A. juanina

Binomial name
- Aplysia juanina (Bergh, 1898)

Synonyms
- Aplysiopsis juanina Bergh, 1898 ·

= Aplysia juanina =

Species of gastropod

Aplysia juanina is a species of gastropod mollusc in the genus Aplysia, family Aplysiidae.

== Description ==
(Original description in German) The specimens preserved in alcohol, which were rather strongly contracted, measured 15–21 mm in length, 10–13 mm in height, and 8–10 mm in width. The rhinophores were 2–2.5 mm high, the tentacles 1–2 mm long, and the gill 4.5–7 mm long, with a height and thickness of 2–2.5 mm. The foot was 5–6 mm wide, the tail about 4 mm long, and the height of the pleuropodia at mid-length was 3.5–5 mm.

The color of the foot was grayish or whitish. The rest of the underside of the body, including the neck and head, was black in most individuals, as were the inner edges of the pleuropodia and the margin surrounding the shell opening. However, in some specimens this black coloration had been largely or completely lost; in two cases it was so reduced that the animals were almost entirely white. The upper surface around the shell was usually bluish white, the mantle edge whitish, and the gill yellowish white. At the posterior end of the dorsal body, the liver usually showed through as brownish or yellowish, while on the right side the hypobranchial gland often appeared whitish, and beneath the gill—usually covered by it—the mucus gland was visible as reddish yellow.

The general body form of the animal corresponded to that of the Aplysiidae. The ventral body consisted of the foot with its lateral lobes, the head, and the neck. The foot was rather strong, with a straight anterior margin bearing a groove and rounded corners, only slightly projecting lateral edges, and a relatively short but broad, rounded tail. The lateral lobes of the foot, or pleuropodia, were not large, the left being slightly larger than the right, which generally covered the dorsal body only up to the margin of the shell. They were fairly thin, especially the broad posterior commissure that connected them and closely adhered to the dorsal surface. The lobes themselves formed gradually rounded or sometimes notched margins, with their anterior ends projecting slightly forward; their surface was entirely smooth.

The head was comparatively large, with a vertical mouth opening—forming a prominent buccal region—with exposed mandible plates. On the sides of the head posteriorly were the ear-like tentacles, and a little farther back and higher up the very similar rhinophores, with the black eyes situated externally at their base. The neck, which connected the ventral and dorsal parts of the body, ascended obliquely and was as thick as the head. Along its right side ran the distinct seminal groove, extending from the vulva to beneath the right tentacle.

The dorsal body lay entirely exposed, its upper surface bearing the shell. It projected freely in front, where it merged into the neck, between the foot lobes, which otherwise covered the lateral and posterior parts of the dorsal surface to varying degrees. On the upper side lay the beautiful shell, partly or largely covered by the thin, closely adhering mantle; in some specimens, only a submedian, elongated oval portion of the shell was left uncovered.

In some cases only a submedian, elongated oval area of the shell is left uncovered. The mantle, slightly broader at the front and rear, is extremely thin over most of its surface, allowing the violet hue of the shell to show through. The edge of the mantle, however, is thickened, fitting closely along the margin of the shell and following on the right side posteriorly the rounded indentation of the shell. Here, the margin is turned upward, and at the lower posterior edge lies the anus.

The shell itself is more or less dark brownish yellow, with an iridescent sheen; only a small projection at its posterior end is white. It is heavily calcified and solid, its surface smooth, marked only by faint growth lines. The shape is irregularly oval, sometimes slightly elongated, sometimes shorter. The somewhat pointed posterior end is twisted toward the right and projects ventrally; at this point the shell thickens and terminates in a small white process situated just within the anal papilla. In front of this posterior end, the right margin bears an indentation that varies somewhat in form and size.

In five individuals examined with regard to this feature, the shell measured 8–10 mm in length, 6–6.25 mm in width, and 3.5–4 mm in height. The shell was moderately vaulted both longitudinally and transversely. The dorsal surface of the shell was covered by a very thin cuticle that extended slightly beyond the shell margin all around.

Beneath the right margin of the mantle lay the gill, projecting more or less prominently and of the usual form. It measured mostly 4.5–7 mm in length, with a height and thickness of about 2.5 mm, and was attached in its anterior half by a low band within the small cavity under the shell margin. The gill was either nearly straight or more strongly curved, with the concave side directed backward and upward.

This connecting band continues through the gill as a dissepiment, to which on both sides the fine gill lamellae bearing lateral filaments are attached. Within this dissepiment run the afferent and efferent branchial vessels—the branchial vein and artery, respectively. Both posteriorly and especially anteriorly, the dissepiment extends for a short distance beyond the gill as a low ridge.

At the posterior end of the gill, and usually covered by it, lies the often indistinct renal pore. In front of and slightly above the aforementioned ridge of the gill dissepiment is a faint structure known as the osphradium, which under the microscope appears as a small, round, finely notched depression.

Beneath the gill, always covered by the pleuropodium, lies the whitish hypobranchial gland. This gland showed considerable variation in development among different individuals; in one specimen, it measured approximately 5.5 mm in length and up to 3 mm in width. It appeared as numerous, more or less distinct, vertically oriented white folds of typical structure, arranged either side by side or grouped with small intervals between them.

After the somewhat difficult removal of the shell, the yellowish-white hermaphroditic gland becomes exposed posteriorly, while in front of it lies the much larger white kidney, through the anterior portion of which the pericardium can sometimes be seen shining through.

The white central nervous system, which can be easily dissected in continuity and surrounds the esophagus, exhibits the typical eight main ganglia. The cerebral ganglia, rounded or slightly oval in shape, are connected by a short upper commissure and a very thin lower subcerebral commissure. They give rise to nerves leading to the buccal tube, the head walls, the tentacles, and the rhinophores, as well as a long optic nerve and a slender acoustic nerve.

A long connective leads to the buccal ganglion, while a shorter one connects to the pleural and a longer one to the pedal ganglion. The rhinophorial nerve forms a small ganglion at the base of the rhinophore groove, from which branches extend laterally .

The rounded pleural ganglia are the smallest. They are connected by short connectives to the cerebral and pedal ganglia, and by a long, thin connective—running on the right side beneath the stomach—to the posterior visceral ganglion. The connectives of both visceral ganglia converge rapidly and lie side by side for more than the posterior half of their course.

The rounded pedal ganglia are generally slightly larger than the cerebral ones. They are connected to each other by a rather long and strong pedal commissure and by a longer, very thin parapedal commissure, as well as by a short connective to the pleural ganglion and a somewhat longer one to the cerebral ganglion. They give rise to strong nerves that supply the anterior and middle parts of the foot, the parapodia, and the posterior foot; the right ganglion also produces a penis nerve.

The visceral ganglia, lying at the anterior end of the liver in front of the pericardium on the right side, are usually of equal size and are connected by a short commissure. They are approximately the same size as the pleural ganglia.

The right, branchio-visceral ganglion gives rise to a strong branchial nerve, as well as an osphradial nerve and another nerve running along the side of the upper body. The left ganglion, the genito-visceral ganglion, sends nerves to the pericardium, as well as several branches to the organs of the upper body (kidney, liver, and reproductive organs). At the anterior end of the mucous gland, it also forms a small secondary genital ganglion.

The buccal ganglia are fairly large—almost as large as the pleural ganglia—oval in shape, and connected by a short commissure, from which a radular nerve extends backward. They also give rise to the usual 2–5 buccal nerves, a long salivary gland nerve, and an esophageal nerve.

The eye is roughly round-oval, about 0.3 mm in diameter. Short muscles seem to attach either to its base or at least to the immediate area surrounding it.

On the anterior side of the pedal ganglia lie the round-oval otocysts, about 0.12 mm in diameter, filled with otoconia measuring 0.01–0.014 mm across.

The osphradium appears as a very fine depression with slightly wrinkled edges, to the posterior side of which the nerve attaches.

The skin contains numerous small glands, partly yellowish, round or flask-shaped. Along the mantle edge that projects over the anterior part of the gill, especially large, cushion-shaped glands occur.

The oral tube is rather short, scarcely 2 mm long, with the usual muscles arising partly from the walls of the head cavity and partly from the posterior part of the pharyngeal bulb. The pharyngeal bulb is robust, measuring 4–4.5 mm in length in three specimens, with a posterior width of 2.5–3 mm and a height of 3.5–5 mm.

Its color is generally grayish or violet-gray posteriorly and ventrally. It is roughly oval in outline, slightly compressed in the anterior half; the thicker, higher posterior half is separated from the anterior by a slight constriction. The anterior half mainly consists of a broad and strong muscular ring, a kind of constrictor muscle of the pharyngeal bulb. The rounded and slightly projecting lower posterior portions of the posterior half are formed chiefly by the upper lingual muscles. Between these, on the underside, the whitish, thick, and flattened posterior end of the radular sac protrudes like a knob.

At the slightly convex anterior end of the pharyngeal head, the vertical mouth slit is bordered by the dirty and dull yellowish lip plates, which are darker toward the front edge. These measure 1.5–1.6 mm in length with an almost uniform width of 0.6–0.75 mm, being only slightly narrower at the very top and bottom, and separated by a very small gap.

They are composed of densely packed, straight, cylindrical rods, only slightly curved at the upper and lower ends, somewhat thicker at the upper end, and finely cross-striated. The rods reach a length of about 0.25 mm and a diameter of approximately 0.013 mm.

The tongue is strong and broad, bearing a wide, yellow, iridescent rasp, which, in the five examined individuals, contained 18–21 rows of tooth plates. Further posteriorly, 11–15 developed and two younger rows were found, giving a total of 33–38 rows. In each row there were 14–15 lateral plates on each side of the median one.

The posterior part of the base of the plates was almost colorless; otherwise they were yellow, except for the 4–5 outermost plates, which were colorless. The width of the median tooth plate at the posterior part of the tongue in the largest individual measured 0.50 mm; the lengths of the five outermost plates were 0.05, 0.06, 0.075, 0.10, and 0.115 mm respectively.

The median tooth plates showed a strongly notched front margin, and the arms of the basal plate were widely spread apart. The large hook was finely denticulated, with two strong denticles on each side.

The following lateral plates were asymmetrical but all similar to one another. The basal plate was thicker along the midline, somewhat pointed posteriorly, the outer edge slightly indented, the inner more straight or convex. The hook, inclined slightly inward, was finely denticulated with two strong outer denticles (or one strong and two to three smaller ones and one to two weaker ones on the inner side.

The last of these hook-bearing plates showed an undenticulated hook with weaker denticles at its base. The outermost four to five plates are completely hookless, while the innermost of these bears a pronounced keel.

The long, white salivary glands extend alongside the esophagus as far as the posterior end of the second stomach, floating almost freely—attached only by their thinner anterior ends near the pharynx and by their posterior ends to the chewing stomach. They measured approximately 15 mm in length, varying in thickness along their course, cylindrical or slightly flattened, up to 0.75 mm wide, and finely nodular.

The esophagus was reddish-gray, about 3 mm long, with a diameter of at least 0.75 mm; its inner surface displayed fine longitudinal folds. It opens anteriorly into the upper side of the rounded first stomach, which communicates with the second stomach through a broad, rounded aperture. The second stomach is more elongated but just as thin-walled as the first; its posterior part (together with the third stomach) lies on the posterior-ventral side of the liver. In the cardia, as well as near the transition to the third stomach, fine longitudinal folds are present, whereas elsewhere the stomach wall is smooth.

The first stomach measured 3–4 mm in length, the second 9–10 mm, with a diameter of 3.5–4 mm. The second stomach opens into the third through a rather wide, round opening; the latter has a diameter of 2–3 mm. It possesses a fairly thick muscular wall and, when detached from its anterior and posterior connections, retains its circular lumen.

The inner surface of this stomach shows, arranged in an irregular ring, 10–12 larger but unevenly sized gastric teeth, with one or two rows of smaller ones before and behind them. These gastric teeth are faintly yellowish, irregular pyramids reaching up to about 1.2 mm in height. They are translucent, with a cartilaginous appearance and consistency; in preserved specimens, they detach easily, leaving behind larger and smaller attachment facets—angular-round, rounded, or slightly oval—up to about 0.5 mm in length.

Behind the chewing stomach follows a short, thin-walled expansion; through this pyloric section, the digestive canal connects on the lower right side with the liver. Within the pylorus there is a rather thick, oblique, low fold, and behind it, on the left, lies the small hepatic cavity, while on the right is the entrance to the intestine. The intestine ascends from the pylorus and continues—usually measuring about 1.3 mm in diameter—in a large, forwardly concave arch along the dorsal surface of the liver on the left side, partly lying on its surface and partly embedded within its substance. It then bends to the right and runs, in its final section exposed beneath the genital organs, as far as the anal papilla.

The latter shows a finely crinkled margin, usually marked by darkly pigmented grooves. The inner wall of the intestine bears delicate longitudinal folds.

The first two stomachs contained a plentiful white, soft material, in which masses of well-preserved lower algal forms could still be identified. The gizzard and the intestine, however, were always empty.

The liver forms a large, reddish-grey mass, somewhat tapering posteriorly and markedly flattened on the right and lower sides (due to pressure from the stomachs). In two specimens, its length measured 19 – 10.5 mm, with both height and width at about 9 mm. The surface appeared finely white-reticulated, with minute mesh-like lobulations. Its upper side was covered by the kidney, which could be fairly easily separated during dissection—less so from the hermaphroditic gland lying behind the kidney, the pericardium in front, and the anterior genital mass resting on the right side.

A small hepatic cavity, situated below and to the right, opened near the pylorus by 3–4 wide, round apertures. From this region arose a short, thick trunk with stout branches running through the liver upward to the surface, where they became visible beneath the left side of the body wall.

The pericardium, located beneath the kidney, measured 5 mm in width and 2.5 mm in length (anteroposteriorly). On the right posterior wall lay the very fine pericardio-renal opening; no distinct organ could be identified there. The heart ventricle, approximately 1.5 mm long, lay transversely. In front of it ran the strong anterior aorta, passing through the pericardium on the right and emerging between the pedal and parapedal commissures.

The white kidney covers the liver, the intestinal loop, and the pericardium as a moderately thin layer, forming also the posterior wall of the latter. Posteriorly it borders the hermaphroditic gland, and on the right, the gill. Its structure is of the usual lamellar, sponge-like type.

The slightly yellowish-white hermaphroditic gland lies behind the kidney, resting on the liver and rectum.

The kidney extends a short distance along the posterior side; its width was generally 4.5–6 mm, with a height of 2.5–3.5 mm and a thickness of about 1–1.5 mm. Its structure was of the usual type, and the lobules contained mature eggs and spermatozoa.

From the underside of the hermaphroditic gland arises a brownish hermaphroditic duct, which is at first very thin and straight in front, then becomes thicker and slightly coiled as it passes forward and to the right beneath the rectum. It opens on the inner (left) side of the albumen (mucus) gland.

This latter gland is white, tapering anteriorly, somewhat flattened, and measures 5–5.5 mm in length, extending forward beneath the pericardium. Along the middle of its (right) anterior surface runs a thin tube; this side is also marked by fine oblique striations, while the inner (left) side is faintly yellowish and rather smooth.

At the posterior end of the mucus gland lies a small, whitish, elongated spermatocyst. At this point, the mucus gland bends into a firm, flattened, somewhat wrinkled, yellowish tube (Fig. 1c) that runs along its underside and continues forward into the oviduct and sperm duct—about 3.5 mm long and divided longitudinally within—which opens through a transverse slit.

At the base of this duct opens the gray spermatheca, about 2.5 mm in diameter; its whitish efferent duct is roughly as long as the spermathecal vesicle itself (Fig. 1e).

At the opening of the ovi-spermiduct begins the seminal groove, which runs along the base of the penis; one of its lips usually covers the groove. The penis was usually retracted into its sheath, at the base of which several strong muscular bands attach, continuing into the substance of the penis.

When fully everted, the penis measured 3–9.5 mm in length, with a diameter of 0.75–1 mm. It was somewhat compressed and traversed along its entire length by a continuation of the seminal groove up to the tip.

The length of the retracted, flattened organs measured 5 mm in length and 15 mm in width. At its inner end, two strong muscles were attached. The glans, traversed by a pronounced groove, measured only 1 mm in length.

In the wall of the organ, yellow, strongly refractive, spherical, hardened bodies—either isolated or gathered in small clusters—were sparsely distributed. These structures had a diameter of approximately 0.020 mm.

The surface of the organ was completely smooth, showing no trace of the fine nodules that can sometimes be found, particularly at the base of the organ, in certain Aplysiid species (e.g., Aplysia depilans).

== Distribution ==
This marine species occurs in the Pacific Ocean off Chile.
