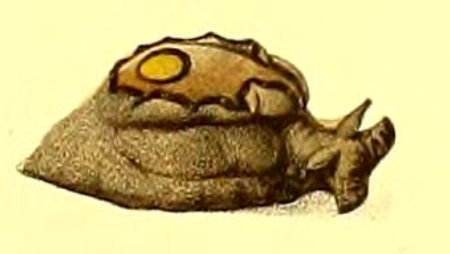
- Aplysia nigrocincta (holotype)

Scientific classification
- Kingdom: Animalia
- Phylum: Mollusca
- Class: Gastropoda
- Order: Aplysiida
- Family: Aplysiidae
- Genus: Aplysia
- Species: A. nigrocincta

Binomial name
- Aplysia nigrocincta E. von Martens, 1880

= Aplysia nigrocincta =

Species of gastropod

Aplysia nigrocincta, the corn-bearing aplysia, is a species of gastropod mollusc in the genus Aplysia, family Aplysiidae.

== Description ==
(Original description in German) In spirit (preserved specimen) only 17 mm long, 11 mm high, and 7 mm wide. The body is smooth and light brown; the free edges of the foot lobes, the margin of the foot sole, and the edge of the rather large opening in the mantle (shield) are black—usually continuous, though occasionally somewhat mottled.

The shell is strongly arched and relatively large, a vivid amber-yellow, appearing reddish in transmitted light through the shield. It is spoon-shaped, with a shallow notch and a strongly incurved tip, measuring 11.5 mm in length, 8 mm in width, and 5 mm in height—occupying more than half the total length of the contracted animal.

== Distribution ==
This species occurs off Mauritius, Indian Ocean.
