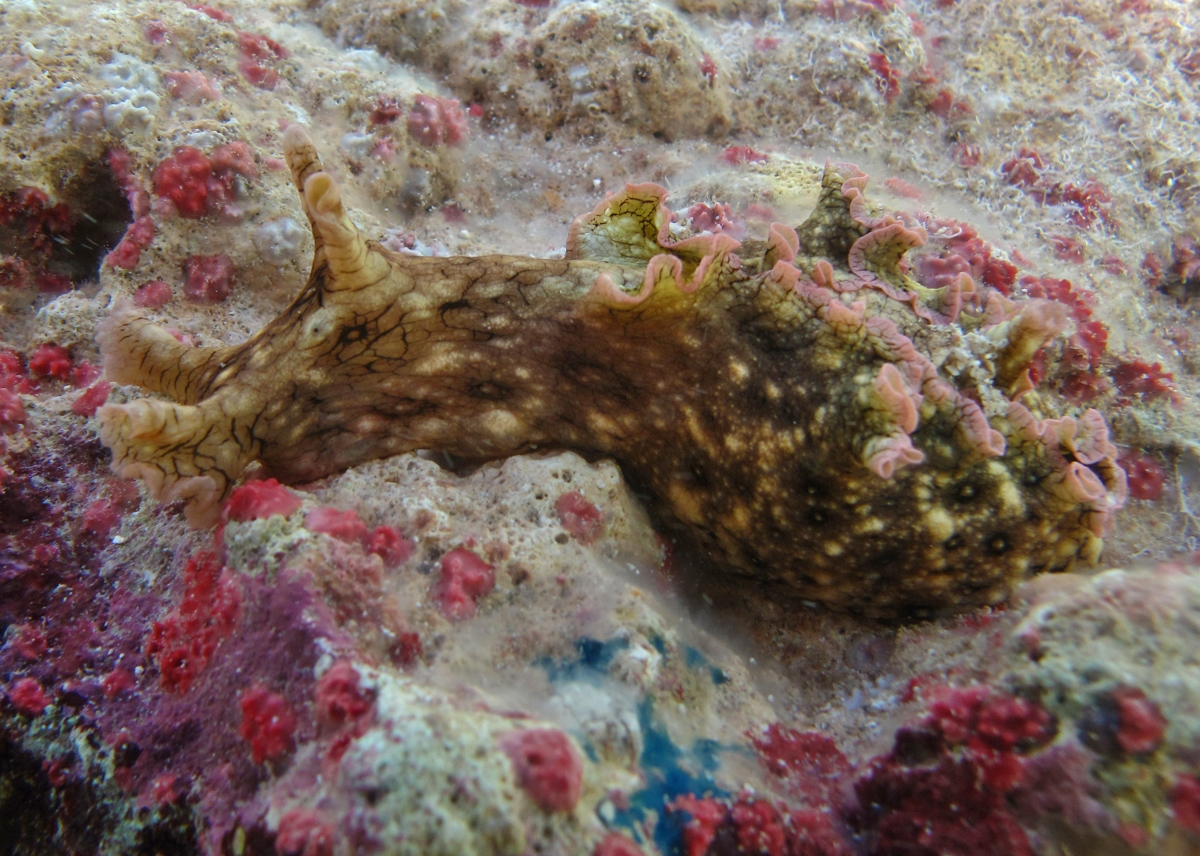

Scientific classification
- Kingdom: Animalia
- Phylum: Mollusca
- Class: Gastropoda
- Order: Aplysiida
- Family: Aplysiidae
- Genus: Aplysia
- Species: A. argus

Binomial name
- Aplysia argus (J.G.Cooper, 1863)

Synonyms
- List: Aplysia angasi G. B. Sowerby II, 1869; Aplysia annulifera Thiele, 1930; Aplysia benedicti Eliot, 1900; Aplysia bourailli Risbec, 1951; Aplysia fimbriata A. Adams & Reeve, 1850; Aplysia pulmonica Gould, 1852; Aplysia odorata Risbec, 1928; Aplysia odorata var. bourailli Risbec, 1951; Aplysia operta (Burne, 1906); Aplysia radiata Ehrenberg, 1831; Aplysia scutellata Ehrenberg, 1831; Aplysia tigrina Rang, 1828; Aplysia velifer Bergh, 1905; Syphonota viridescens Pease, 1868; Tethys benedicti Eliot, 1900; Tethys operta Burne, 1906

= Aplysia argus =

Species of gastropod

Aplysia argus is a species of gastropod mollusc in the genus Aplysia, family Aplysiidae.

This species is native to the Indo-Pacific region. The common name for Aplysia argus is the White speckled sea hare.

== Description ==
(Original description in Latin) Sea hare with an olive-colored body, with ocellated (eye-like) spots scattered everywhere on its back; the ocelli are composed of a whitish spot with a dark-brown margin.

This species has long been confused with Aplysia dactylomela (living in the Atlantic Ocean) because they are morphologically very similar, but genetic studies have shown that those found in the Indo-Pacific are indeed a distinct species. Aplysia argus are very small creatures that grow up to 8 inches in length. They are gray to brown with white specks and brown or black rings.

== Distribution & Habitat ==
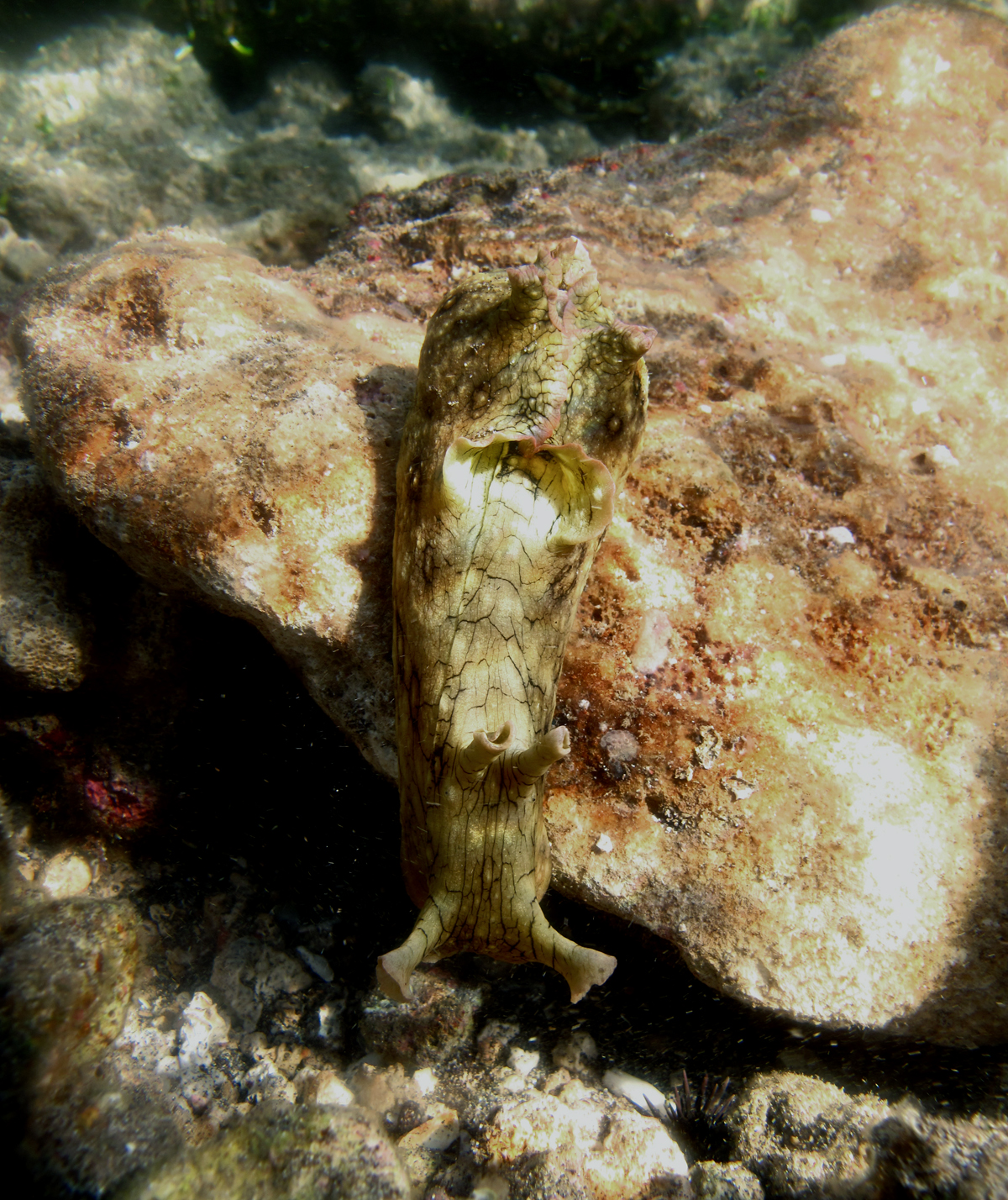
A. argus in Réunion

Aplysia argus are species native to the Indo-Pacific region. Areas such as the Hawaiian islands, French Frigate Shoals, Laysan, Midway and Kure. They can be found in shallow pools of seawater surrounded by rocks ranging from three to six feet deep. They are nocturnal creatures and during the day they hide underneath rocks. Most sea hares stay near their egg masses.
