= Aplysia elongata =

Scientific classification
- Kingdom: Animalia
- Phylum: Mollusca
- Class: Gastropoda
- Order: Aplysiida
- Family: Aplysiidae
- Genus: Aplysia
- Species: A. elongata

Binomial name
- Aplysia elongata (Pease, 1860)

Synonyms
- Syphonota elongata Pease, 1860

Species of gastropod

Aplysia elongata, the corn-bearing aplysia, is a species of gastropod mollusc in the genus Aplysia, family Aplysiidae.

== Description ==
The length of the species attains 5 cm.

(Original description) The animal's form is oblong and smooth. Its back is highly elevated, imparting a slightly compressed appearance. The mantle-lobes are strongly dilated, undulated, and free along nearly their entire dorsal length. The dorsal tentacles are rather slender and ear-shaped, while the anterior pair are large and dilated. The foot is narrow, terminating in a posterior point that projects beyond the back.

The coloration ranges from darker to lighter brown, with the most intense color present on the top of the head and neck. The entire dorsal region is clouded and minutely speckled with white.

The shell is distinctly defined within the living animal, covered by a thin, translucent membrane.

== Distribution ==
This species occurs off Hawaii.
