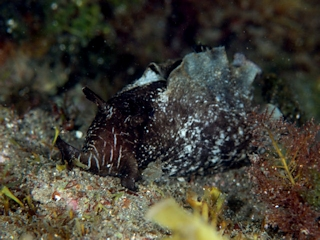

Scientific classification
- Kingdom: Animalia
- Phylum: Mollusca
- Class: Gastropoda
- Order: Aplysiida
- Family: Aplysiidae
- Genus: Aplysia
- Species: A. kurodai

Binomial name
- Aplysia kurodai (Baba, 1937)

Synonyms
- Tethys kurodai Baba, 1937 superseded combination

= Aplysia kurodai =

Species of gastropod

Aplysia kurodai is a species of gastropods belonging to the family Aplysiidae.

== Description ==
The gastropod has a deep purple-blue secretion that is viscous and water soluble. The secretion discolors after prolonged exposure to light to a dark brown color.

== Distribution ==
The species is found in Japan and Southeastern Asia.
