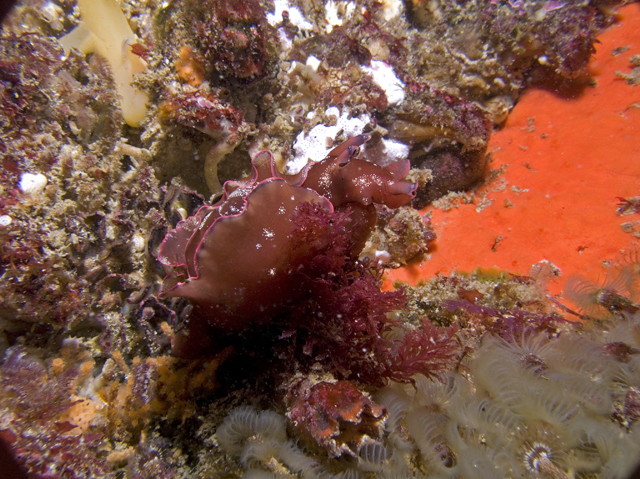

Scientific classification
- Kingdom: Animalia
- Phylum: Mollusca
- Class: Gastropoda
- Order: Aplysiida
- Family: Aplysiidae
- Genus: Aplysia
- Species: A. parvula

Binomial name
- Aplysia parvula Mörch, 1863

Synonyms
- List: Aplysia australiana Clessin, 1899; Aplysia concava Sowerby, 1869; Aplysia norfolkensis Sowerby, 1869; Aplysia spuria Krauss, 1848; Pruvotaplysia parvula Mörch, 1863; Tethys parvula (Mörch, 1863)

= Dwarf sea hare =

Species of gastropod

The dwarf sea hare or pygmy sea hare, Aplysia parvula, is a species of sea hare, a marine gastropod mollusc in the family Aplysiidae.

== Distribution ==
Aplysia parvula was long seen as a circumtropical sea hare species, but Golestani et al. (2019) restricted the name A. parvula to the population from tropical waters in the northwest Atlantic, while resurrecting A. elongata, A. japonica, A. atromarginata, and A. nigrocincta for populations from the Indo-Pacific and describing the new species A. ghanimii and A. hooveri for populations from the eastern Pacific.

The type locality of Aplysia parvula is Saint Vincent, Lesser Antilles.

== Description ==
The dwarf sea hare is round-bodied and smooth-skinned with a slender head bearing extensions which resemble rabbit ears. There are wing-like flaps (parapodia) extending from the body, which is brown to maroon or olive green in colour and may be covered with clusters of white spots.

The maximum recorded length for this animal is 60 mm.

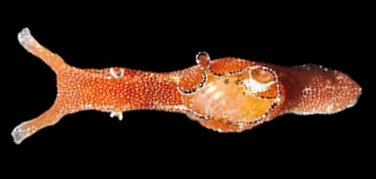
Dorsal view

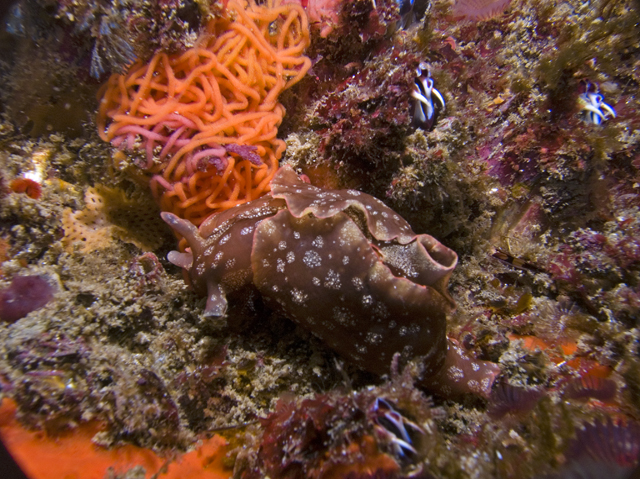
Dwarf sea hare with its egg ribbon

== Ecology ==
The minimum recorded depth for this species is 0.5 m; maximum recorded depth is 30 m. It usually occurs in less than 5 m of water, but is occasionally found in water as deep as 24 m.

The species is a herbivore, and feeds on different types of algae. Its egg mass is a tangled mass of sticky orange, green or brown strings found under rocks or among algae.
