= Aplysia japonica =

Scientific classification
- Kingdom: Animalia
- Phylum: Mollusca
- Class: Gastropoda
- Order: Aplysiida
- Family: Aplysiidae
- Genus: Aplysia
- Species: A. japonica

Binomial name
- Aplysia japonica G. B. Sowerby II, 1869

Synonyms
- Aplysia japonica Clessin, 1899 (junior homonym and synonym of...); Aplysia sieboldiana Clessin, 1899

Species of gastropod

Aplysia japonica , the Japan aplysia, is a species of gastropod mollusc in the genus Aplysia, family Aplysiidae.

== Description ==
(Original description) The shell is obliquely ovate and subpellucid, colored an obscure chestnut. Internally, it is minimally calcareous. The dorsum (back) is tumid (swollen) at its center, featuring a slight rib and a depression near the dorsal margin. The apex is elevated and markedly incurved, presenting biauriculation (having two ear-like projections). The upper margin is sloped, deeply excavated, short, and rounded at its extremity. The outer lip is rounded, while the lower margin is subquadrate. The dorsal margin is slightly arched.

== Distribution ==
This marine species occurs off Japan, Korea, China, Taiwan and Hong Kong.
