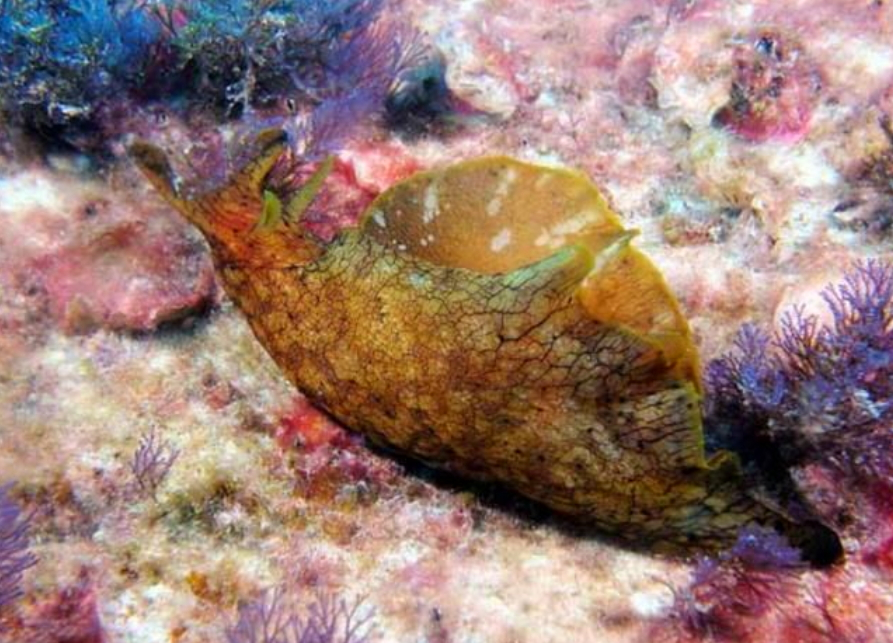
- Live specimen of Aplysia sowerbyi

Scientific classification
- Kingdom: Animalia
- Phylum: Mollusca
- Class: Gastropoda
- Order: Aplysiida
- Superfamily: Aplysioidea
- Family: Aplysiidae
- Genus: Aplysia
- Species: A. sowerbyi

Binomial name
- Aplysia sowerbyi Pilsbry, 1895

Synonyms
- Aplysia (Varria) sowerbyi Pilsbry, 1895

= Aplysia sowerbyi =

Species of gastropod

Aplysia sowerbyi is a species of gastropod mollusc in the genus Aplysia, family Aplysiidae.

== Description ==
(Original description) The animal is olive-colored, mottled with black.

The shell measures 22 x 16 mm. The shell is internal, thin, horn-colored, and oblong, produced and curved at the apex. The shell is oblong, thin, somewhat trigonal, pale, oblique, and hatchet-shaped. It is arched and swollen (tumid), with sinuous striations near the umbones. The interior is thinly testaceous.

The apex is elevated and incurved, bearing a small, widely reflected callus. The upper margin slopes downward, being arched and excavated, and rounded at the extremity. The outer lip is sinuously produced anteriorly, while the dorsal margin is obliquely arched and excavated. The lower portion of the dorsal margin, corresponding to the siphonal canal in spiral shells, is deeply excavated. This species is believed to be the one to which Pliny first applied the name Lepus marinus— the "sea hare."

== Distribution ==
This marine species is endemic to Australia and occurs off New South Wales, Northern Territory, Queensland and Victoria.
