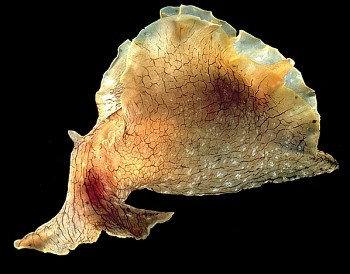

Scientific classification
- Kingdom: Animalia
- Phylum: Mollusca
- Class: Gastropoda
- Order: Aplysiida
- Family: Aplysiidae
- Genus: Aplysia
- Species: A. extraordinaria

Binomial name
- Aplysia extraordinaria (Allan, 1932)

Synonyms
- List: Aplysia cronullae Eales, 1960; Aplysia denisoni E. A. Smith, 1884; Tethys extraordinaria Allan, 1932 (basionym); Varria extraordinaria (Allan, 1932)

= Aplysia extraordinaria =

Species of gastropod

Aplysia extraordinaria, common name the "extraordinary sea hare", is a very large species of sea slug, more specifically a sea hare, a marine opisthobranch gastropod mollusk in the family Aplysiidae, the sea hares.

== Description ==
The length of the shell attains 30 mm and 27 broad.

(Described as Aplysia denisoni) The body is high and exhibits a distinct pedal disk, produced posteriorly into a caudal termination. The entire surface is wrinkled and dirty whitish, with black veining (possibly staining) within the wrinkles.

The mantle-lobes are moderately large, commencing anteriorly some distance behind the posterior tentacles and terminating slightly in advance of the tail. The anterior tentacles are large, compressed, and notably dilated. The posterior tentacles are large, cylindrical, with the apical slit not extending halfway down the outer side; they are positioned slightly closer to the oral tentacles than to the beginning of the mantle-lobes. The eyes are minute, situated near the outer anterior base of the tentacles.

The shell is very thin and straw-colored.

== Distribution ==
Its distribution includes the coast off of eastern Australia, northern New Zealand, and possibly a wider range.

It is most likely the same species as Aplysia gigantea which is found off of the western coast of Australia, but this has yet to be confirmed.
