= Aplysia hooveri =

Scientific classification
- Kingdom: Animalia
- Phylum: Mollusca
- Class: Gastropoda
- Order: Aplysiida
- Family: Aplysiidae
- Genus: Aplysia
- Species: A. hooveri

Binomial name
- Aplysia hooveri Golestani, Crocetta, Padula, Camacho-García, Langeneck, Poursanidis, Pola, Yokeş, Cervera, D.-W. Jung, Gosliner, Araya, Hooker, Schrödl & Á. Valdés, 2019

Species of gastropod

Aplysia hooveri is a very large species of sea slug, more specifically a sea hare, a marine opisthobranch gastropod mollusk in the family Aplysiidae, the sea hares.

== Distribution ==
This marine species occurs off Mexico, Panama, Colombia and Ecuador.
