= Aplysia atromarginata =

Scientific classification
- Kingdom: Animalia
- Phylum: Mollusca
- Class: Gastropoda
- Order: Aplysiida
- Family: Aplysiidae
- Genus: Aplysia
- Species: A. atromarginata

Binomial name
- Aplysia atromarginata Bergh, 1905

Species of gastropod

Aplysia atromarginata is a species of gastropod mollusc in the genus Aplysia, family Aplysiidae.

== Description ==
(Original description in German) The specimen, which underwent a thorough examination, was notably contracted, measuring 16 mm in length with both a height and width of 9 mm. Its rhinophores were 3 mm high, and its tentacles were almost the same size. The foot-flaps extended 11 mm (in a straight line) with a height of 4 mm. The mantle was 10 mm long and 8 mm wide, with the shell opening measuring 5.5 mm long and 4.5 mm wide. The mantle siphon was 4 mm long, and the gill 6 mm. The penis protruded freely, reaching a length of 4 mm. The foot sole was 4 mm wide.

The animal's overall color was yellowish. The foot-flaps displayed a narrow black margin along their entire length, and a similar line bordered the mantle opening, creating a stark contrast with the chalk-white shell. The right mantle edge, which extended over the gill cavity, was a dark blue-gray for a width of 1.5 mm, and the foot edge was black.

The shell was strongly hardened and chalk-white both externally and internally. It featured a relatively thick, yellow cuticle that easily detached in one piece. The shell itself measured 9 mm in length, 7.5 mm in width, and 3 mm in height. The nuclear part was significantly curved forward and downward. The growth lines were quite pronounced.

A dense white glandular deposit was present beneath the gill, at the base of the foot-flap.

The central nervous system appeared consistent with that of other authentic Aplysias.

The yellowish pharynx measured 3.5 mm in length, with a width and height of 3 mm. The mandible plates were of typical form and size, brownish-yellow, and composed of the characteristic rod-shaped elements, reaching at least 0.16 mm in length with a diameter of 0.013 mm. The palatal thorns matched the form and size observed in the previous species.

The brownish-yellow radula of the tongue contained 20 rows of tooth plates, with an additional 14 rows in the sheath, totaling 34 rows. Each row typically held up to 17 plates on either side of the median. The tooth plates were yellow. The median plate measured 0.20 mm in width; the first lateral plate was 0.14 mm long and 0.10 mm high. The widths of the next three lateral plates were 0.05 mm, 0.06 mm, and 0.075 mm, respectively, followed by three more at 0.12 mm, 0.13 mm, and 0.14 mm. The median plates exhibited their usual form, with a rather robust hook on each side bearing several (5-6) denticles, including 3 stronger denticles on each side of the hook. The innermost lateral plates also showed a denticulated hook along their edges, with 2 denticles on each side. Further outwards, the hook lacked denticles, but 1-2 denticles were present on each side of it. The 6-7 outermost plates were entirely devoid of a hook.

The white salivary glands were similar to those found in other Aplysiidae.

The foregut measured 1.5 mm in length. The gizzard was also 1.5 mm long, with its plates arranged in the typical manner, bright yellow, and up to 0.75 mm high. The hindgut was 4 mm long. The gray liver measured 5 mm in length.

The anterior genital mass was somewhat compressed, with an oval outline, 4 mm long, and exhibited a yellowish-gray and chalk-white coloration. The robust penis featured a distinct groove that extended to its tip.

== Distribution ==
This marine species occurs off Indonesia (Bali), Papua New Guinea and Vanuatu.
