= Aplysia cornigera =

Scientific classification
- Kingdom: Animalia
- Phylum: Mollusca
- Class: Gastropoda
- Order: Aplysiida
- Family: Aplysiidae
- Genus: Aplysia
- Species: A. cornigera

Binomial name
- Aplysia cornigera G. B. Sowerby II, 1869

Species of gastropod

Aplysia cornigera, the corn-bearing aplysia, is a species of gastropod mollusc in the genus Aplysia, family Aplysiidae.

== Description ==
(Original description) The shell is talon-shaped, narrow, ovate, and arched, with concentric striations. Its apex is highly elevated, incurved, acuminated, and calloused. The upper margin is depressed, excavated, and obtusely angular at its extremity. The outer lip is sinuously and obliquely produced ventrally. The lower margin is slightly acuminated anteriorly. The dorsal margin is rounded, reflected, and features a radiating groove.

== Distribution ==
This species occurs in the Indian Ocean and in the West Pacific.
