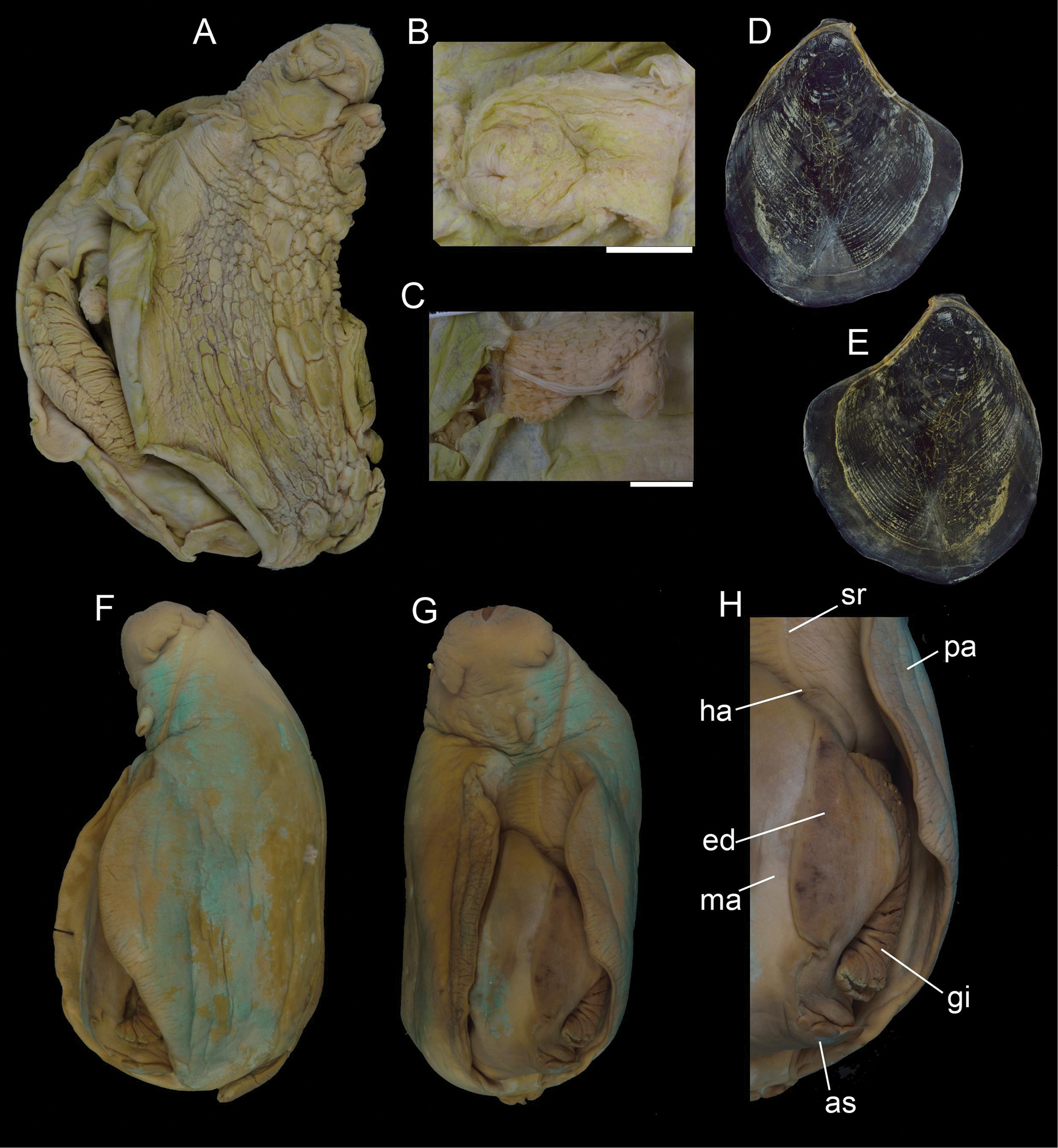
- Aplysia perviridis (holotype)

Scientific classification
- Kingdom: Animalia
- Phylum: Mollusca
- Class: Gastropoda
- Order: Aplysiida
- Family: Aplysiidae
- Genus: Aplysia
- Species: A. perviridis

Binomial name
- Aplysia perviridis (Pilsbry, 1895)

Synonyms
- Tethys willcoxi var. perviridis Pilsbry, 1895 ·

= Aplysia perviridis =

Species of gastropod

Aplysia perviridis is a species of gastropod mollusc in the genus Aplysia, family Aplysiidae.

== Description ==
(Original description) Length 14 cm in life, contracting to 11 cm in alcohol.

The body is large, distinctly swollen posteriorly. Anterior processes are broadly folded dorsally; the tentacles are conical and slit as usual. The swimming lobes are very ample, free, and united only at their insertion near the tail. The mantle is large, with an extremely minute perforation, its edges thickened but not tubular, and surrounded by fine radial wrinkles visible only under magnification. The papilla measures less than 1 mm in diameter. The posterior right margin of the mantle is excised, forming a short excurrent channel. The genital opening is situated well forward, as in Aplysia willcoxi. The opaline gland is located 20–22 mm behind the genital pore, projecting externally as a pedunculated oval body in the type specimen; this structure may be evaginated, in which case it would possess a single large orifice.

Coloration (in life): Head and tentacles are clear green; the swimming lobes are olive-green with a coarse, black, reticulate pattern divided by fine veins, and irregularly maculated with light green patches bearing groups of white dots. The extruded mouth parts are purple.

Coloration (in alcohol, 10 months): Overall grass-green with black reticulation on the sides caused by contraction of black veins. Foot clear green. Mantle green with scattered whitish clouds. Inner surface of swimming lobes greenish to dirty whitish, marked with black in the sinus between lobes and body, the black extending well along the lobes toward the posterior end. No distinct black markings along the inner edges of the lobes.

The shell is Large, depressed, thin, and yellowish, with faint concentric growth lines and coarse, indistinct radiating striae. The calcareous layer is thin; the cuticular layer projecting well beyond it. The apex is moderately incurved, with the epidermis reflexed across it as in Aplysia willcoxi. The sinus is shallow and broad. Length 60 mm, breadth 52 mm.

== Distribution ==
This species occurs off New Jersey, USA.
