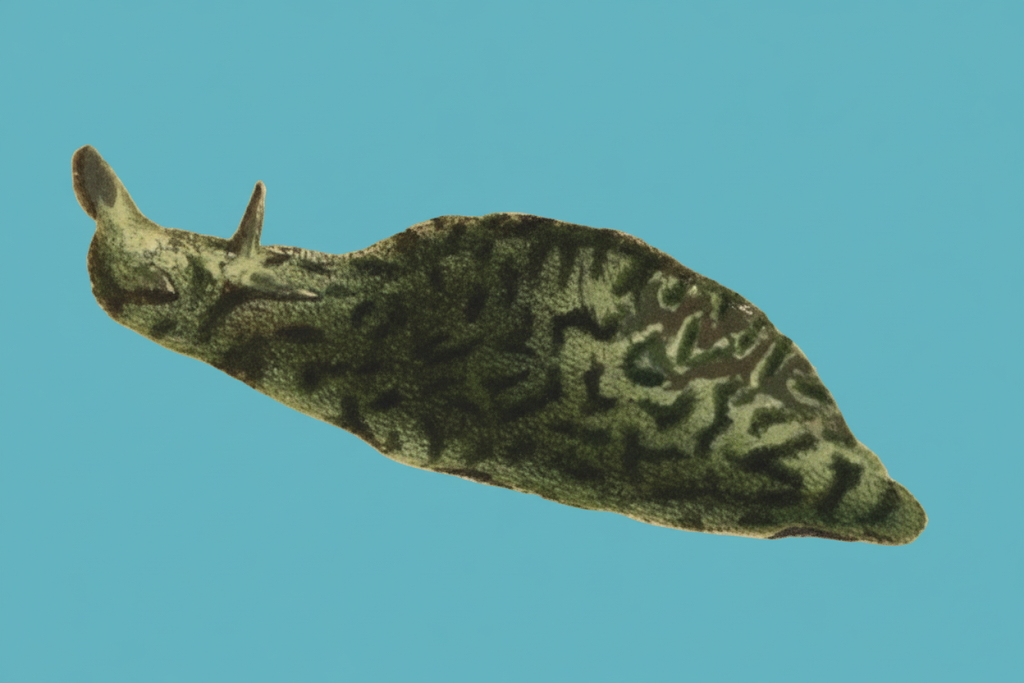
- Aplysia maculata (holotype)

Scientific classification
- Kingdom: Animalia
- Phylum: Mollusca
- Class: Gastropoda
- Order: Aplysiida
- Family: Aplysiidae
- Genus: Aplysia
- Species: A. maculata

Binomial name
- Aplysia maculata Rang, 1828

Synonyms
- List: Aplysia eusiphonata Bergh, 1907; Aplysia gargantua Bergh, 1907; Aplysia gilchristi Bergh, 1908; Aplysia poikilia Bergh, 1907; Aplysia tigrinella Gray, 1850; Tethys maculata (Rang, 1828); Tethys maculata var. bipartita W. H. Turton, 1932

= Aplysia maculata =

Species of gastropod

Aplysia maculata is a species of sea hare or sea slug, a marine opisthobranch gastropod mollusk in the family Aplysiidae.

== Description ==
(Original description in French) The animal is oblong and notably convex, depressed at its base, elongated anteriorly, and obtuse posteriorly. The mantle is smooth, olive-brown with scattered pale spots. It possesses medium-sized lobes, a very open dorsal cavity, a reddish operculum, an elongated siphon, and pink gills.

The shell is oval, deeply concave, membranous, and minimally calcareous. It features a small, almost posterior indentation, and its apex is slightly recurved and thick. Both faces of the shell are reddish-brown.

Detailed description: The general body form is markedly convex dorsally and elongated at both anterior and posterior extremities, though considerably more so anteriorly. Posteriorly, instead of being acute, the body is rounded. When the animal engages in crawling, its foot extends fully, causing the inferior part of the mantle to depress all around.

The anterior tentacles lack any particular distinguishing features. The posterior tentacles are pointed and slightly elongated, though their apices are prone to morphological variation. The eyes are quite apparent. While the mantle lobes are not exceptionally large, it is presumed they can assist in swimming. When the lobes separate, the dorsal opening becomes very wide, revealing a reddish interior cavity, a color especially prominent on the operculum. The operculum itself appears almost crescent-shaped, an effect amplified by the very large siphon. The gills are pink. The mantle is smooth and olive-brown, notably marked with numerous pale spots.

Shell characteristics: The shell is almost entirely horny. However, its brilliant inner surface still retains some vestiges of the calcareous layer found in other species. It is somewhat transparent and reddish-brown. The shell's form is oval and deeply concave, with a slightly recurved and rather thick apex. The indentation is small and situated almost posteriorly.

== Distribution ==
This marine species occurs off Cape of Good Hope, South Africa.
