= Aplysia vistosa =

Scientific classification
- Kingdom: Animalia
- Phylum: Mollusca
- Class: Gastropoda
- Order: Aplysiida
- Family: Aplysiidae
- Genus: Aplysia
- Species: A. vistosa

Binomial name
- Aplysia vistosa Pruvot-Fol, 1953

Species of gastropod

Aplysia tanzanensis is a species of gastropod mollusc in the genus Aplysia, family Aplysiidae.

== Distribution ==
This marine species occurs off Morocco.
