= Aplysia concava =

Scientific classification
- Kingdom: Animalia
- Phylum: Mollusca
- Class: Gastropoda
- Order: Aplysiida
- Family: Aplysiidae
- Genus: Aplysia
- Species: A. concava

Binomial name
- Aplysia concava G. B. Sowerby I, 1833

Synonyms
- Aplysia (Pruvotaplysia) concava G. B. Sowerby I, 1833 alternative representation; Aplysia norfolkensis G. B. Sowerby I, 1869 junior subjective synonym

Species of gastropod

Aplysia concava, common name the Norfolk Island aplysia, is a species of gastropod mollusc in the genus Aplysia, family Aplysiidae.

== Description ==
The length of the species attains 75 mm.

(Original description as Aplysia norfolkensis) The shell is horny, brown, and thinly constructed. It presents an arched, ventricose, and obliquely subovate form with a smooth surface. The apex is elevated and rounded, featuring a posterior auriculation (an ear-like projection). Its upper margin is sloped and excavated. The outer lip is rather convex, and the lower margin is rounded. The dorsal margin is arched, rounded, and thinly reflected near the apex, inclining obliquely towards the lower end.

== Distribution ==
This species occurs off New Zealand and in the Australian part of the Tasman Sea.
