= Aplysia sagamiana =

Scientific classification
- Kingdom: Animalia
- Phylum: Mollusca
- Class: Gastropoda
- Order: Aplysiida
- Family: Aplysiidae
- Genus: Aplysia
- Species: A. sagamiana

Binomial name
- Aplysia sagamiana Baba, 1949

Species of gastropod

Aplysia sagamiana is a species of gastropod mollusc in the genus Aplysia, belonging to the family Aplysiidae.

== Description ==
The length of the species attains 350 mm.

== Distribution ==
This marine species occurs off Sagami Bay (Japan); also off Southeast Australia and Poor Knights Islands (New Zealand).
