= Aplysia parva =

Scientific classification
- Kingdom: Animalia
- Phylum: Mollusca
- Class: Gastropoda
- Order: Aplysiida
- Family: Aplysiidae
- Genus: Aplysia
- Species: A. parva

Binomial name
- Aplysia parva Pruvot-Fol, 1953

Species of gastropod

Aplysia parva is a species of gastropod mollusc in the genus Aplysia, family Aplysiidae.

According to E. Marcus this is a young Aplysia juliana.

== Distribution ==
This species occurs off Morocco.
