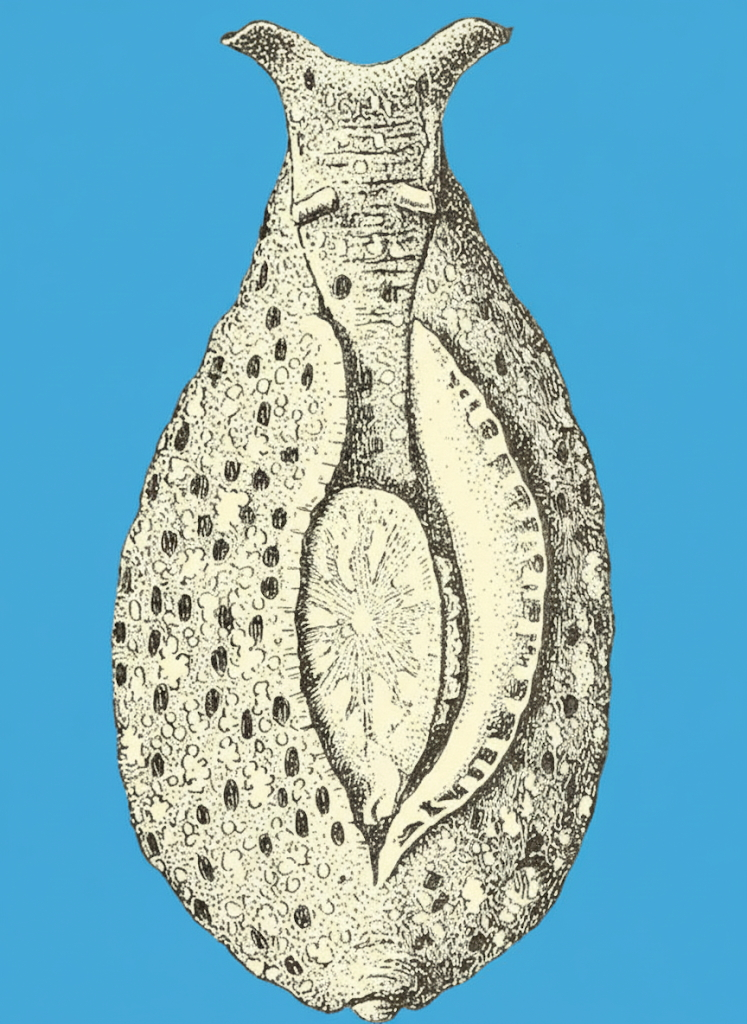
- Original drawing of Aplysia cervina

Scientific classification
- Kingdom: Animalia
- Phylum: Mollusca
- Class: Gastropoda
- Order: Aplysiida
- Family: Aplysiidae
- Genus: Aplysia
- Species: A. cervina

Binomial name
- Aplysia cervina (Dall & C. T. Simpson, 1901)

Synonyms
- Tethys cervina Dall & C. T. Simpson, 1901 superseded combination

= Aplysia cervina =

Species of gastropod

Aplysia cervina is a species of gastropod mollusc in the genus Aplysia, family Aplysiidae.

== Description ==
The animal's length is 70 mm. The length of the shell attains 30 mm, its diameter 19 mm.

(Original description) The animal's body is elongated and flabby. Its mouth is encircled by thick lips, and it possesses short tentacles with eyes inserted anteriorly. The swimming lobes are thick and converge posteriorly, joining some distance in front of the caudal extremity. The mantle orifice is minute, and the mantle itself terminates posteriorly in a small fold. The foot is narrow and nearly smooth.

The body presents a lurid gray ground color, overlaid with darker reticulations and blotches. Additionally, its surface is uniformly covered with scattered, small, nearly round, smoky brown spots. The foot is smoky brown, notably lighter than these spots. The inner edges of the swimming lobes are beautifully and distinctly maculated with alternating light and dark patches. While the mantle shares the body's general coloration, it lacks the dark spots, and its dark reticulations exhibit a somewhat radiating pattern. .

The internal shell possesses a fairly robust calcareous layer and an elliptical outline. It features a moderately sized posterior sinus.

== Distribution ==
This species was discovered off Puerto Rico. It also occurs off Florida.
