= Aplysia dura =

Scientific classification
- Kingdom: Animalia
- Phylum: Mollusca
- Class: Gastropoda
- Order: Aplysiida
- Family: Aplysiidae
- Genus: Aplysia
- Species: A. dura

Binomial name
- Aplysia dura Eales, 1960

Species of gastropod

Aplysia dura, the corn-bearing aplysia, is a species of gastropod mollusc in the genus Aplysia, family Aplysiidae.

== Description ==
The length of the species attains 130 mm. It is 54 mm. wide and 54 mm. high.

== Distribution ==
This species occurs off Tristan da Cunha, South Atlantic Ocean; also in the Cook Strait, New Zealand.
