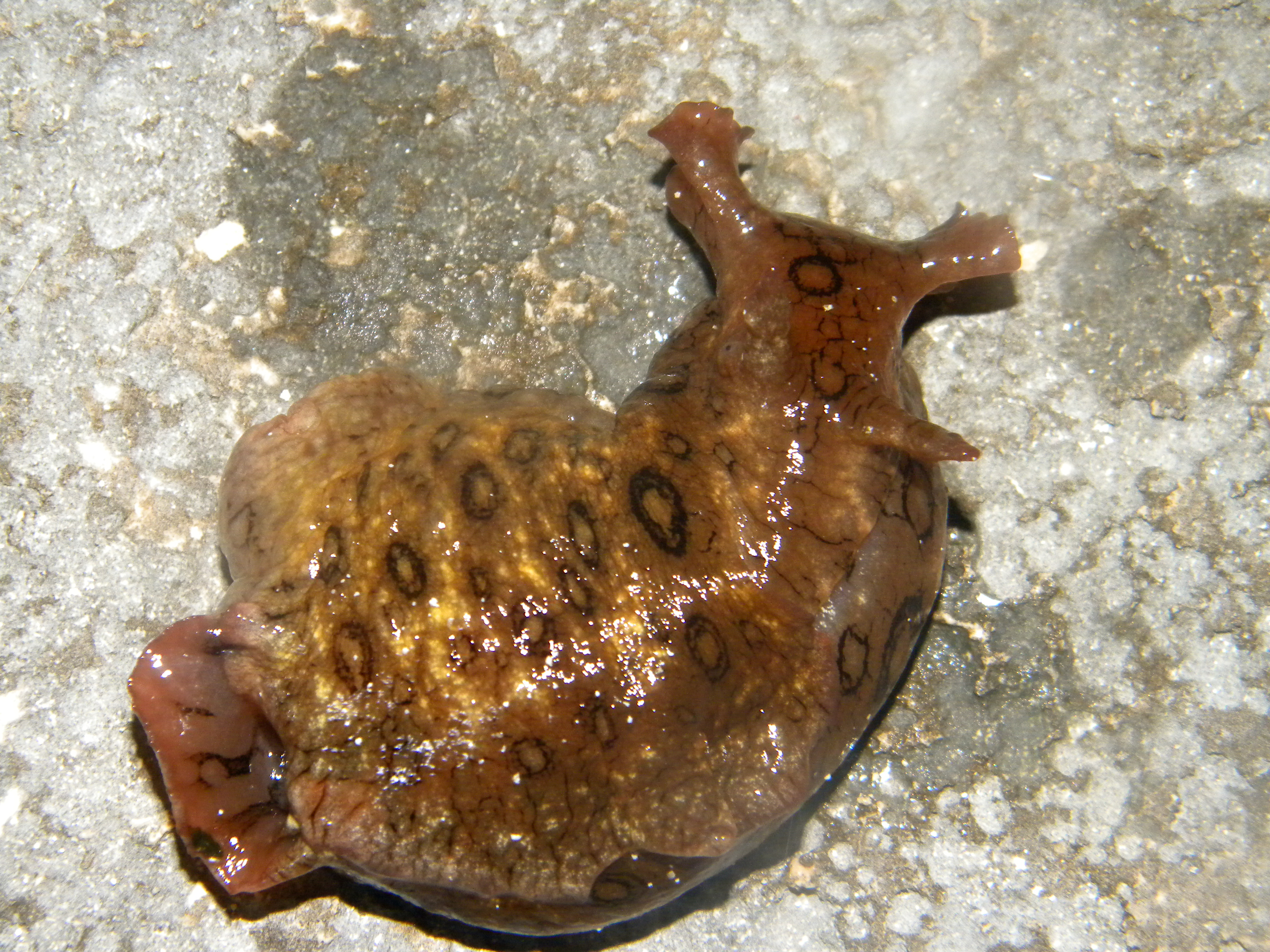
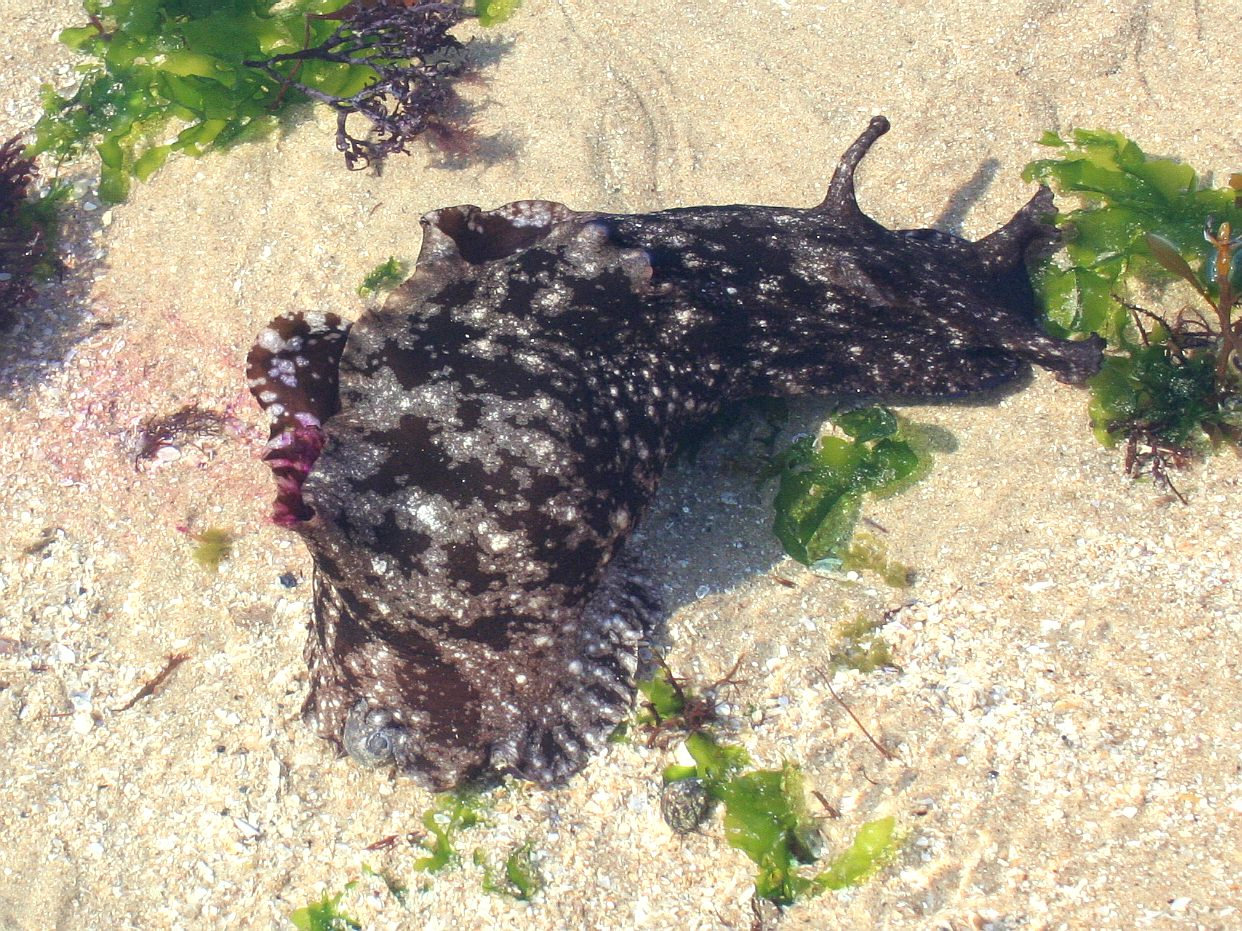
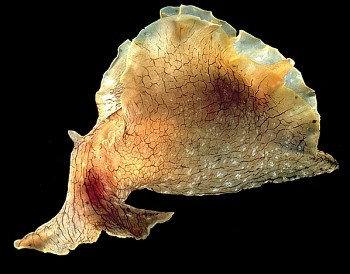
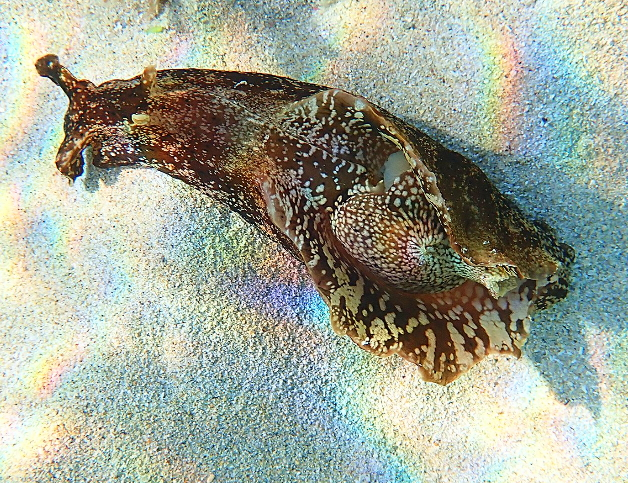
- Aplysia californica Aplysia dactylomela Aplysia depilans Aplysia extraordinaria Aplysia punctata Aplysia reticulata

Scientific classification
- Kingdom: Animalia
- Phylum: Mollusca
- Class: Gastropoda
- Order: Aplysiida
- Family: Aplysiidae
- Genus: Aplysia; Linnaeus, 1767

Type species
- Aplysia depilans Gmelin, 1791

Species
- 42, see text

Synonyms
- List: Aplysia (Aplysia) Linnaeus, 1767; Aplysia (Metaplysia) Pilsbry, 1951; Aplysia (Neaplysia) J. G. Cooper, 1863; Aplysia (Pruvotaplysia) H. Engel, 1936; Aplysia (Subaplysia) M. Medina, T. Collins & Walsh, 2005; Aplysia (Tethys) Linnaeus, 1767; Aplysia (Tullia) Pruvot-Fol, 1933; Aplysia (Varria) Eales, 1960; Aplysiopsis Bergh, 1898; Laplysia Linnaeus, 1767; Phyllobranchopsis Eliot, 1905; Pruvotaplysia Engel, 1936; Tethys (Aplysia) Linnaeus, 1767; Tethys (Neaplysia) J. G. Cooper, 1863

= Aplysia =

Genus of sea slugs

Aplysia (/əˈplɪʒ(i)ə/) is a genus of medium-sized to extremely large sea slugs, specifically sea hares, which are a kind of marine gastropod mollusk.

These benthic herbivorous creatures can become rather large compared with most other mollusks. They graze in tidal and subtidal zones of tropical waters, mostly in the Indo-Pacific Ocean but can also be found in the Atlantic Ocean, with a few species occurring in the Mediterranean. There are 42 recognized species within the genus. When threatened, Aplysia species release clouds of ink which is believed to blind the attacker.

== Nervous system ==
Diagram of simplified nervous system of Aplysia

Aplysia species have a rather simple nervous system with large neurons which has been well-mapped by researchers. They have only about 20,000 neurons. These neurons are extremely large in size compared to the neurons of humans, with the largest (named R2) measuring up to 1.1 mm in diameter. Following the lead of Eric R. Kandel, the genus has been studied extensively as a model organism by neurobiologists to study the effects of drugs, results of injury, and pathways of neuron healing following spinal cord injuries and nervous system-related syndromes in humans.

The nervous system of Aplysia is a type of the long-looped euthyneurous condition, with a total of nine ganglia, three of which are marked in the adjacent diagram as ce (cerebral ganglion), pl (pleural ganglion) and pe (pedal ganglion). Also marked is ab. sp (abdominal ganglion) which represents the supra-intestinal ganglion of streptoneura and gives off the nerve to the o (osphradium, the olfactory organ).

The gill and siphon withdrawal reflex, as studied in Aplysia californica, is mediated by electrical synapses, which allow several neurons to fire synchronously. This quick neural response is necessary for a speedy reaction to danger by the animal. Also, the 'tongue' on the underside is controlled by only two neurons, which allowed complete mapping of the innervation network to be carried out.

== Reproduction ==
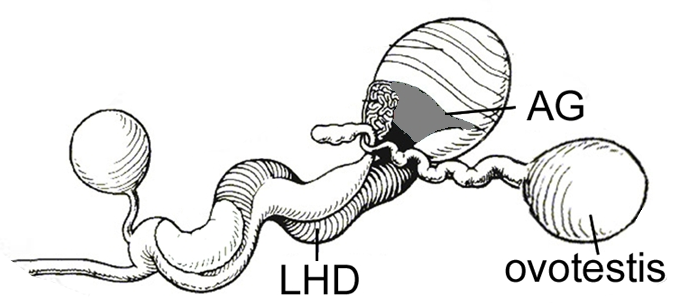
Reproductive system of Aplysia showing the albumen gonad (AG), ovotestis and the large hermaphroditic duct (LHD)

Aplysia are simultaneous hermaphrodites, meaning each adult individual sea hare possesses both male and female reproductive structures (ovotestis) that may be mature at the same time. They also possess the hermaphroditic duct like many other hermaphroditic gastropod mollusks.

Aplysia have the ability to store and digest allosperm (sperm from a partner) and often mate with multiple partners. A potent sex pheromone, the water-borne protein attractin, is employed in promoting and maintaining mating in Aplysia. Attractin interacts with three other Aplysia protein pheromones (enticin, temptin or seductin) in a binary fashion to stimulate mate attraction.

Following fertilization, individuals lay an egg mass while wagging their head back and forth. The egg mass is made up of long gelatinous strings and varies in color depending on the species, such as bright pink, orange or yellow. Each strand consists of many capsules and each capsule may contain up to 100 eggs depending on multiple factors such as age of the individual. The eggs hatch within 15-20 days into free-swimming larvae which feed on phytoplankton.

Aplysia fasciata (in top right corner) laying an orange egg mass

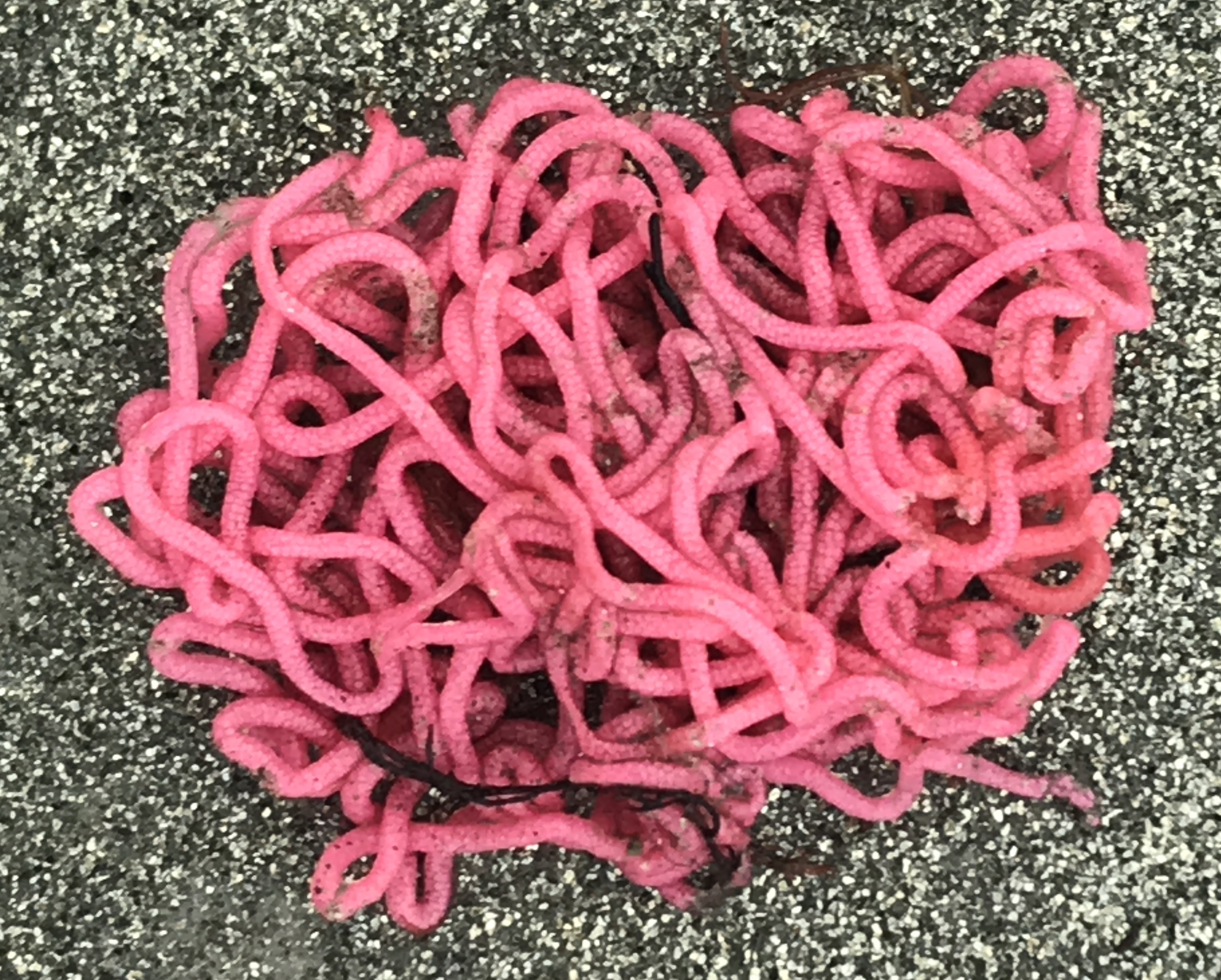
Pink egg mass of a Aplysia species

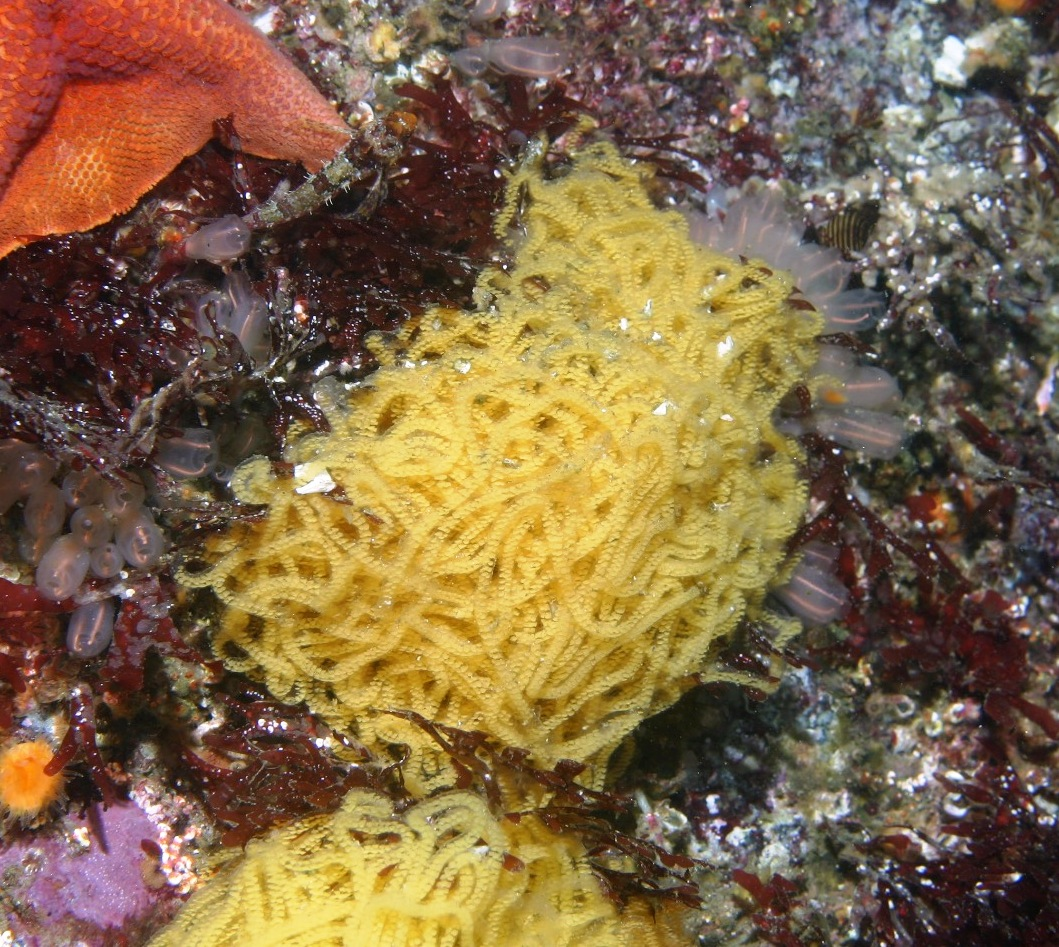
Yellow egg mass of A. californica

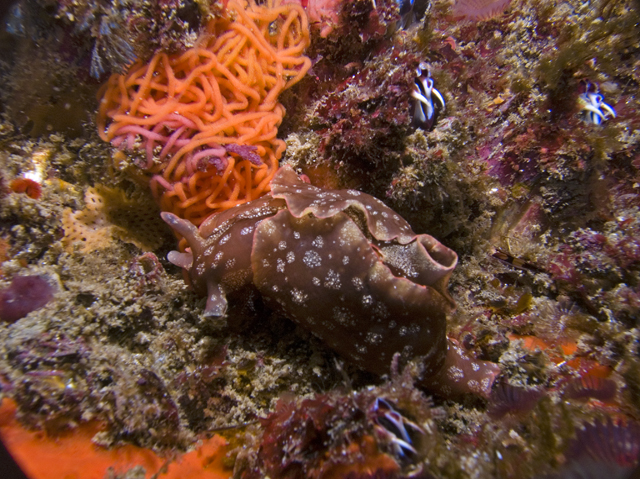
Aplysia parvula with its orange egg mass of

Studies of multiple matings in the California sea hare, A. californica, have provided insights on how conflicts between the sexes are resolved.

== Self-defense ==
Aplysia species was once thought to use ink to escape from predators, much like the octopus. Instead, recent research has made it clear that these sea slugs are able to produce and secrete multiple compounds within their ink, including the chemodeterrant Aplysioviolin and toxic substances such as ammonia for self-defense.

The ability of the Aplysia species to hold toxins within their bodies without poisoning themselves is a result of the unique way that the toxin is stored within the slug. Different molecules essential to the creation of the toxin are accumulated in separate parts of the body of the slug, rendering them benign, as only the mixing of all the molecules can result in a toxic chemical cloud. When the sea hare feels threatened it immediately begins the process of defending itself by mixing the distinct molecules in an additional part of the body used specifically for that purpose. At which point, enzymes within the sea slug begin the process of making the substance toxic, and the mixture is ejected out at the predator in self-defense.

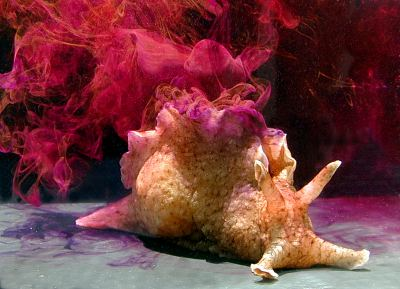
A. californica releasing ink

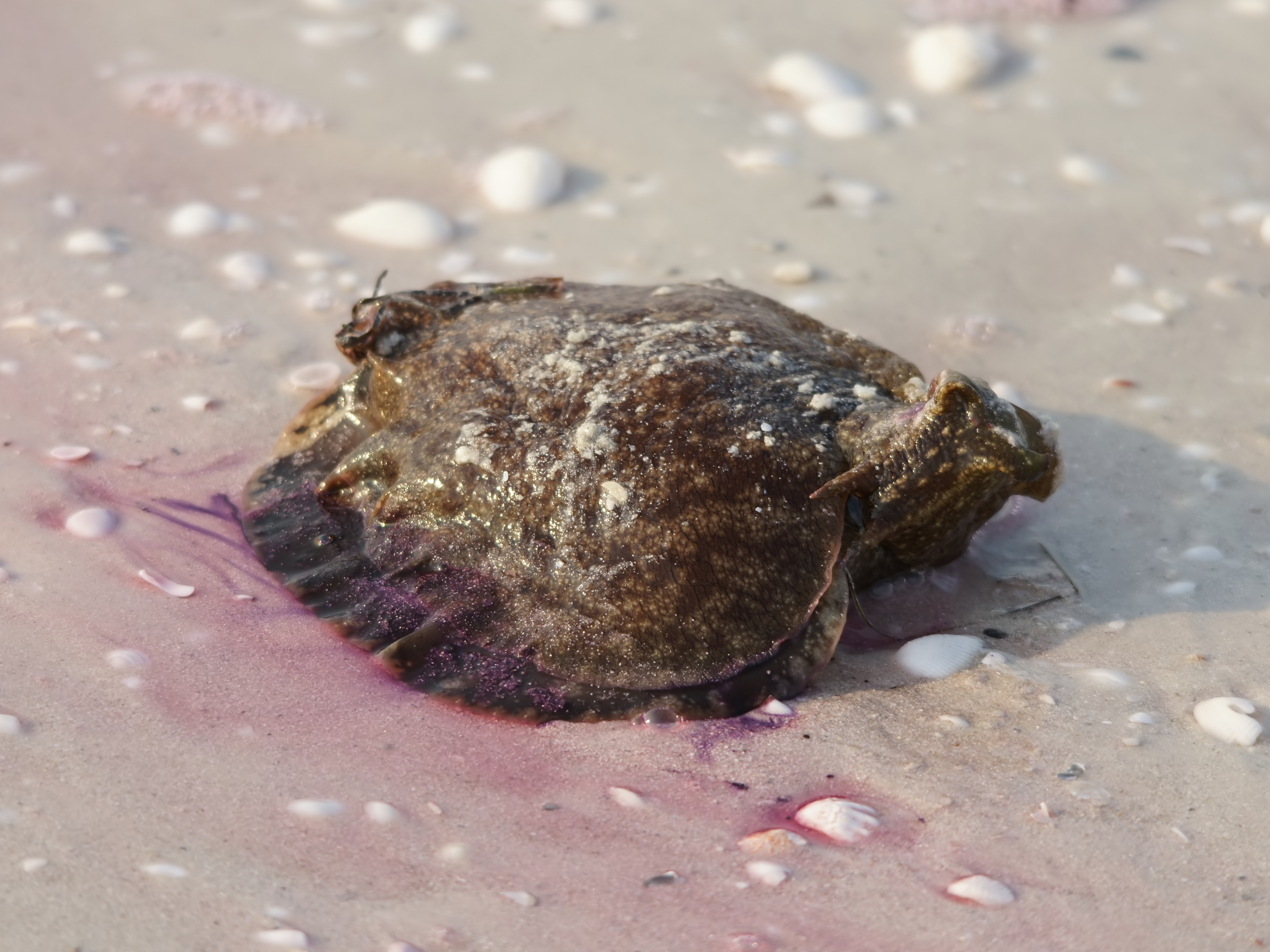
A. fasciata with released ink

A. dactylomela surrounded by its ink

== Research ==
=== Long-term memory ===
In neurons that mediate several forms of long-term memory in Aplysia, the DNA repair enzyme poly ADP ribose polymerase 1 (PARP-1) is activated. In virtually all eukaryotic cells tested, the addition of polyADP-ribosyl groups to proteins (polyADP-ribosylation) occurs as a response to DNA damage. Thus the finding of activation of PARP-1 during learning and its requirement for long-term memory was surprising. Cohen-Aromon et al. suggested that fast and transient decondensation of chromatin structure by polyADP-ribosylation enables the transcription needed to form long-term memory without strand-breaks in DNA. Subsequent to these findings in Aplysia, further research was done with mice and it was found that polyADP-ribosylation is also required for long-term memory formation in mammals.

In 2018, scientists from the University of California showed that the behavioral modifications characteristic of a form of nonassociative long-term memory in Aplysia can be transferred by RNA.

=== Operant conditioning ===
Diagram of detailed nervous system of Aplysia

Operant conditioning is considered a form of associative learning. Because operant conditioning involves intricate interaction between an action and a stimulus (in this case food) it is closely associated with the acquisition of compulsive behavior. The Aplysia species serve as an ideal model system for the physical studying of food-reward learning, due to "the neuronal components of parts of its ganglionic nervous system that are responsible for the generation of feeding movements." As a result, Aplysia has been used in associative learning studies to derive certain aspects of feeding and operant conditioning in the context of compulsive behavior.

In Aplysia, the primary reflex studied by scientists while studying operant conditioning is the gill and siphon withdrawal reflex. The gill and siphon withdrawal reflex allows the Aplysia to pull back its siphon and gill for protection. The links between the synapses during the gill and siphon withdrawal reflex are directly correlated with many behavioral traits in the Aplysia such as its habits, reflexes, and conditioning. Scientists have studied the conditioning of the Aplysia to identify correlations with conditioning in mammals, mainly regarding behavioral responses such as addiction. Through experiments on the conditioning of the Aplysia, links have been discovered with the synaptic plasticity for reward functions involved in the trait of addiction within mammals. Synaptic plasticity is the idea that the synapses will become stronger or weaker depending on how much those specific synapses are used. Conditioning of these synapses can lead them to become stronger or weaker by causing the neurons to fire or not fire when influenced by a stimulus. The conditioning of behavioral traits is based on the idea of a reward function. A reward function is when a stimulus is conditioned to fire according to a certain stimulus. The neurons will adapt to that stimulus, and fire those neurons more easily, even if the stimulus has a negative effect on the subject (in this case the Aplysia). In mammals, the reward function is mainly controlled by ventral tegmental area (VTA) dopamine neurons. During conditioning (in mammals), the VTA dopamine neurons have an increased effect on the stimuli being conditioned, and a decreased effect on the stimuli not being conditioned. This induces the synapses to form an expectation for reward for the stimuli being conditioned. The properties of the synapses displayed in the tests on conditioning involving the Aplysia (which has dopamine neurons but not a ventral tegmental area) are proposed to be directly comparable to behavioral responses such as addiction in mammals.

== Taxonomy ==
=== Phylogeny ===
In 2005, Medina et al. established a phylogenetic hypothesis for the genus Aplysia through study of the partial mitochondrial DNA (mtDNA) sequence data of ribosomal genes (rDNA). A 2026 study of analyses of mitochondrial genome data from 112 specimens of the genus from the Eastern Pacific produced the following phylogeny tree.

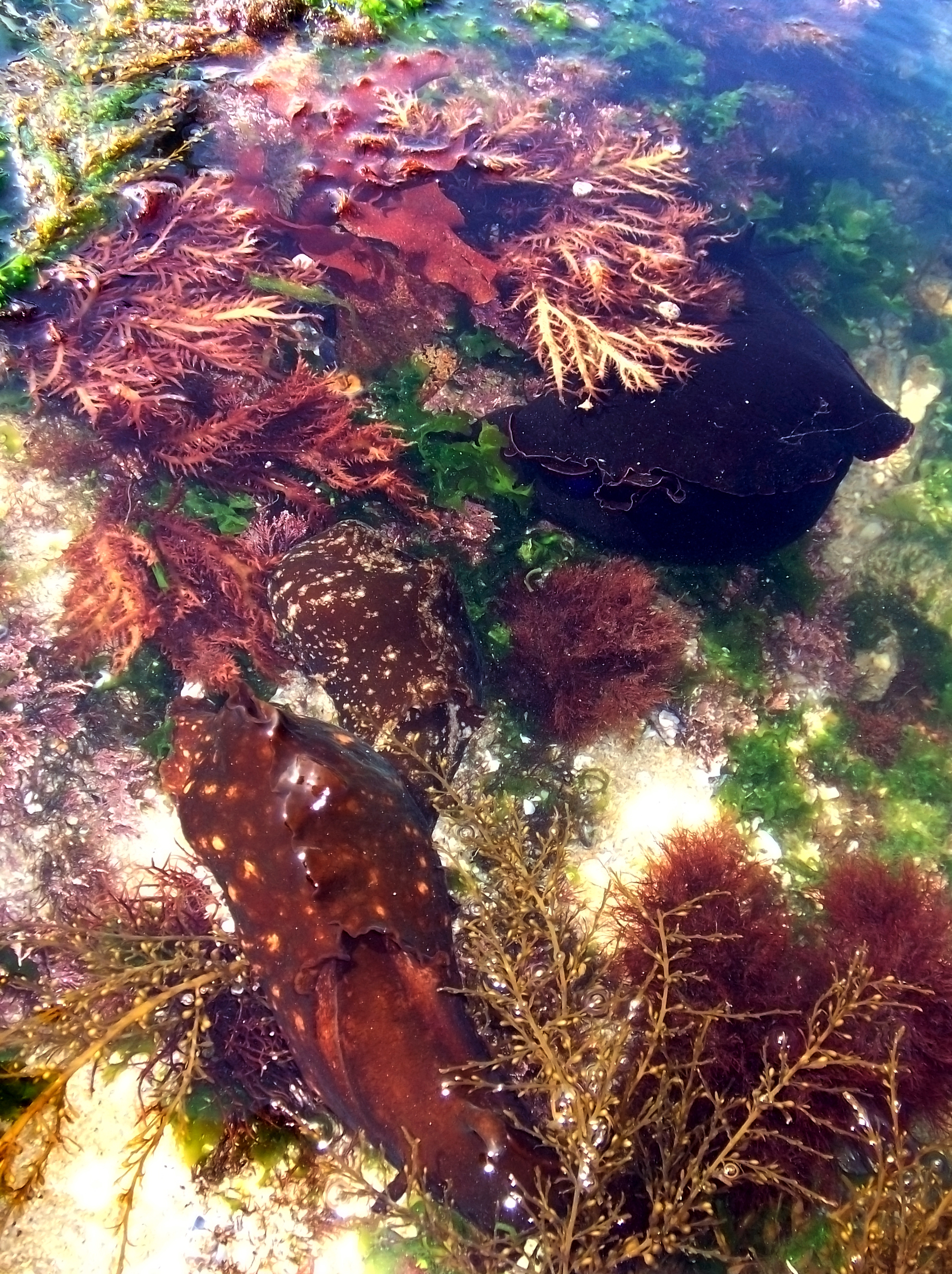
An Aplysia fasciata (above) and a couple of Aplysia punctata (below) grazing in a tide pool in Póvoa de Varzim, Portugal.

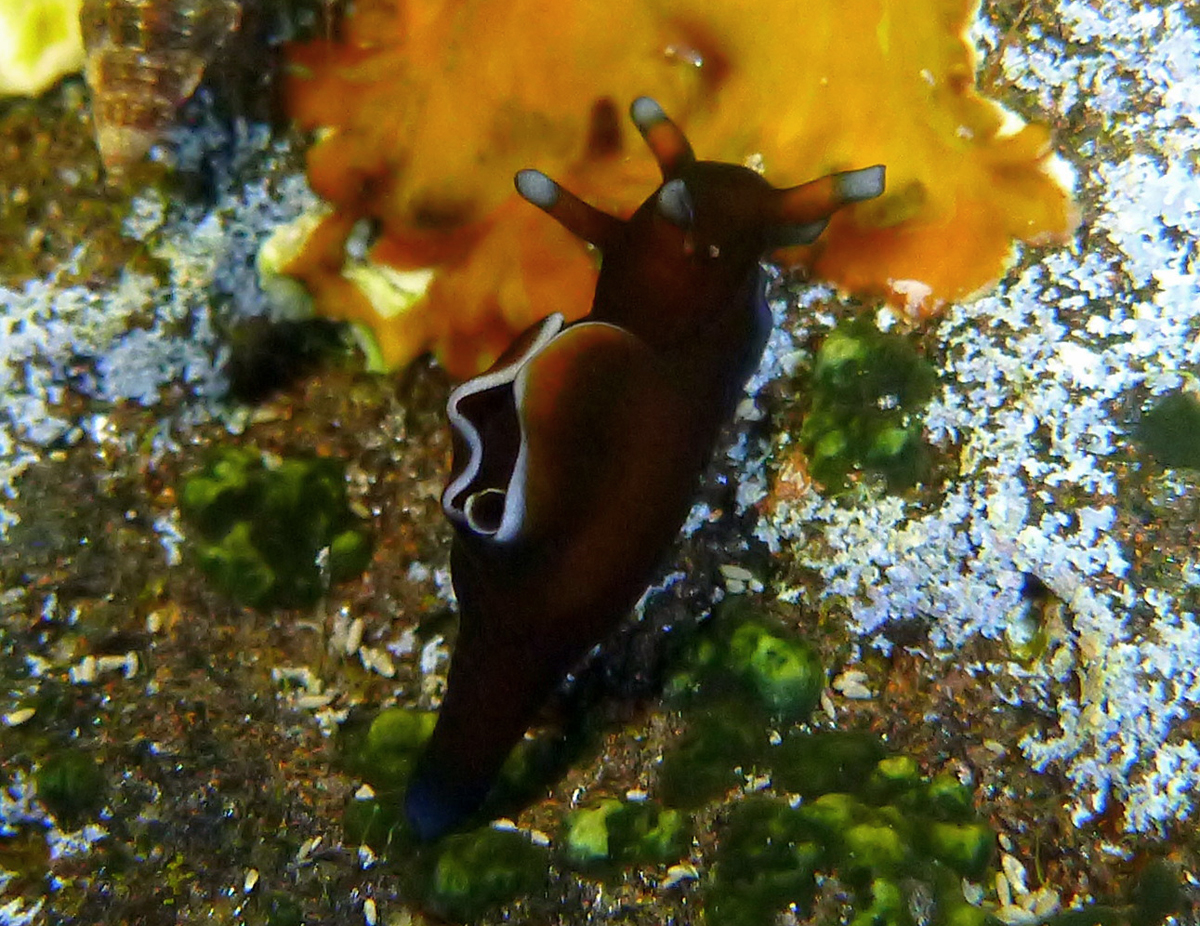
Aplysia parvula

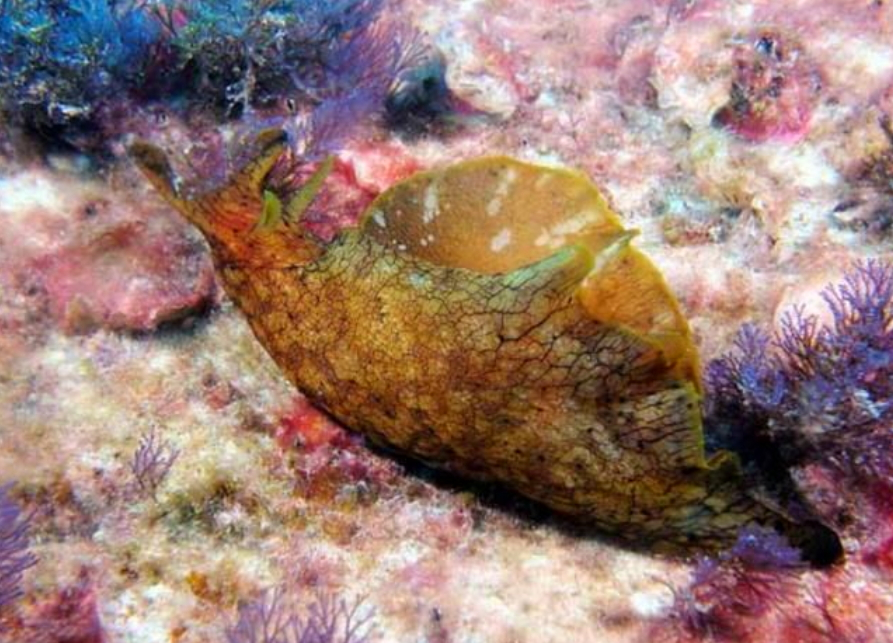
Aplysia sowerbyi

- Aplysia
  - Varria subgenus
    - - Aplysia oculifera
    - - - - - - - Aplysia argus
                - Aplysia dactylomela
              - Aplysia kurodai
            - Aplysia morio
          - Aplysia extraordinaria
          - Aplysia gigantea
        - - - Aplysia cervina
            - Aplysia fasciata
          - - Aplysia californica
            - Aplysia lessonii
  - - Pruvotaplysia subgenus
      - - - - Aplysia atromarginata
            - Aplysia parvula
          - - - Aplysia concava
              - Aplysia ghanimii
            - Aplysia punctata
        - Aplysia japonica
      - - Aplysia elongata
        - - Aplysia nigrocincta
          - Aplysia hooveri
    - Aplysia subgenus
      - Aplysia juliana
      - - Aplysia cf. juliana
        - - Aplysia depilans
          - - Aplysia vaccaria
            - Aplysia nigra

=== Species ===
There are 42 recognized species within the genus Aplysia distributed worldwide. Species within the genus Aplysia are as follows.

- Aplysia argus Rüppell & Leuckart, 1830
- Aplysia atromarginata Bergh, 1905
- Aplysia brasiliana Rang, 1828
- Aplysia californica J.G. Cooper, 1863
- Aplysia cervina Dall & Simpson, 1901
- Aplysia concava G. B. Sowerby I, 1833
- Aplysia cornigera G.B. Sowerby II, 1869
- Aplysia dactylomela Rang, 1828
- Aplysia depilans Gmelin, 1791
- Aplysia dura Eales, 1960
- Aplysia elongata Pease, 1860
- Aplysia extraordinaria Allan, 1932
- Aplysia fasciata Poiret, 1798
- Aplysia ghanimii Golestani, Crocetta, Padula, Camacho, Langeneck, Poursanidis, Pola, Yokeş, Cervera, Jung, Gosliner, Araya, Hooker, Schrödl & Valdés, 2019
- Aplysia gigantea G.B. Sowerby II, 1869
- Aplysia gilchristi Bergh, 1907
- Aplysia hooveri Golestani, Crocetta, Padula, Camacho, Langeneck, Poursanidis, Pola, Yokeş, Cervera, Jung, Gosliner, Araya, Hooker, Schrödl & Valdés, 2019
- Aplysia japonica G. B. Sowerby II, 1869
- Aplysia juanina Bergh, 1898
- Aplysia juliana Quoy & Gaimard, 1832
- Aplysia keraudrenii Rang, 1828
- Aplysia kurodai Baba, 1937
- Aplysia lessonii Rang, 1828
- Aplysia maculata Rang, 1828
- Aplysia morio A. E. Verrill, 1901
- Aplysia nigra d'Orbigny, 1837
- Aplysia nigrocincta von Martens, 1880
- Aplysia oculifera Adams & Reeve, 1850
- Aplysia parva Pruvot-Fol, 1953
- Aplysia parvula Guilding in Moerch, 1863
- Aplysia perviridis Pilsbry, 1895
- Aplysia pilsbryi Letson, 1898
- Aplysia pulmonica Gould, 1852
- Aplysia punctata Cuvier, 1803
- Aplysia reticulata Eales, 1960
- Aplysia rudmani Bebbington, 1974
- Aplysia sagamiana Baba, 1949
- Aplysia sowerbyi Pilsbry, 1895
- Aplysia sydneyensis G.B. Sowerby II, 1869
- Aplysia tanzanensis Bebbington, 1974
- Aplysia vaccaria Winkler, 1955
- Aplysia vistosa Pruvot-Fol, 1953
