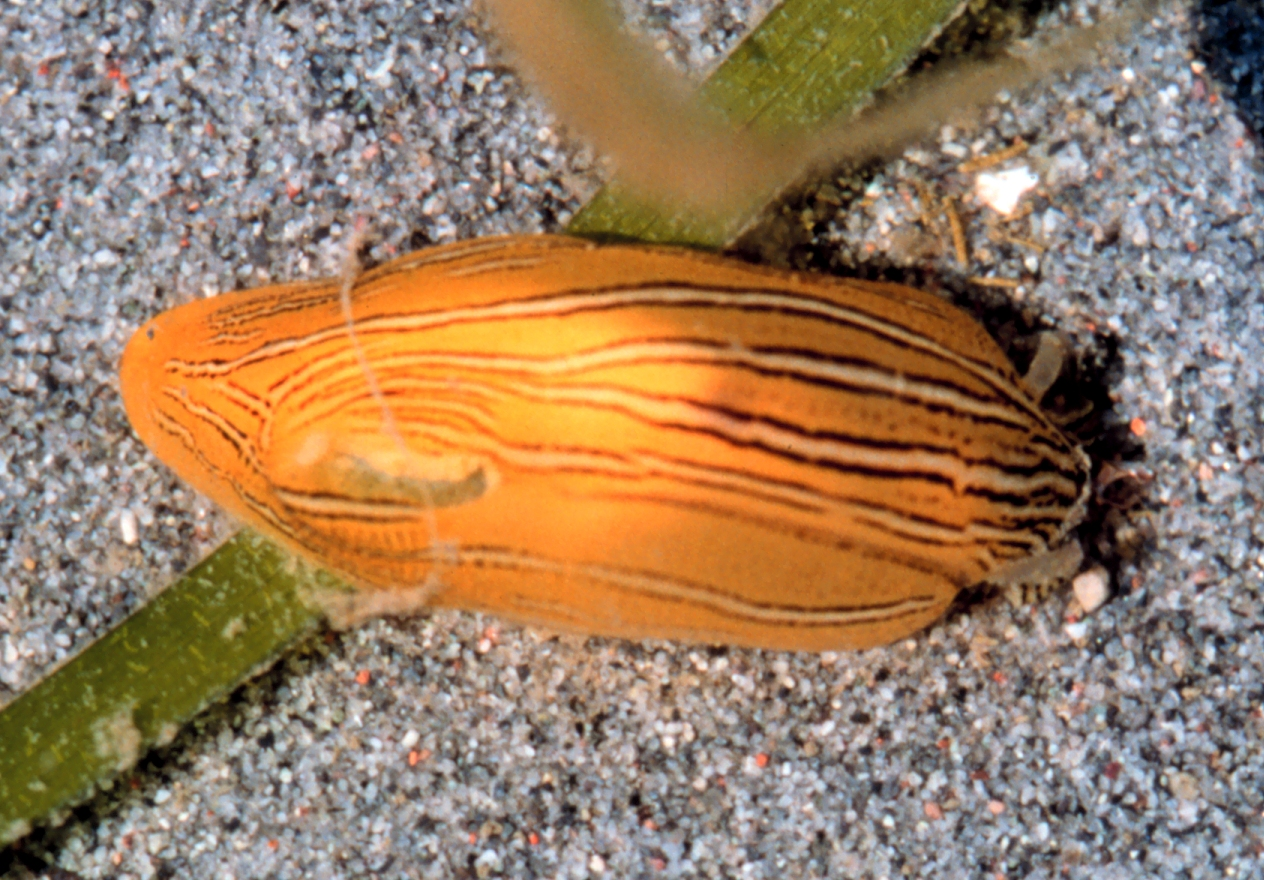
- A live individual of Phyllaplysia taylori, head end towards the right

Scientific classification
- Kingdom: Animalia
- Phylum: Mollusca
- Class: Gastropoda
- Order: Aplysiida
- Family: Aplysiidae
- Genus: Phyllaplysia
- Species: P. taylori

Binomial name
- Phyllaplysia taylori Dall, 1900

= Phyllaplysia taylori =

Species of gastropod

Phyllaplysia taylori, synonym Phyllaplysia zostericola, common names the "eelgrass sea hare" and "Taylor's sea hare", is a species of sea slug, specifically a sea hare, a marine gastropod mollusc in the family Aplysiidae, the sea hares.

Some authors place this genus in a separate family, Dolabriferidae.

A more general description of sea hares can be found on the page of the superfamily Aplysioidea.

== Description ==
Two color morphs of this sea hare have been observed, bright green, and yellow, with characteristic black and white stripes (see Beeman 1970 for more complete description)

Phyllaplysia taylori has a dorsally flattened body, being well camouflaged on Zostera marina, the eelgrass it is found almost exclusively on. It grazes on epiphytes that settle on Zostera blades - sponges and diatoms.

== Distribution and habitat ==
Phyllaplysia taylori inhabit the intertidal photic zone on the Pacific Coast of North America, occurring from British Columbia, Canada, to San Diego, CA, US. They live in estuarine habitats and complete their life cycles entirely on Zostera marina. As such, they are euryhaline and eurythermal to accommodate changing conditions of estuaries.^{[1]} They are weak osmoregulators, which allows them to thrive best in low saline environments above 25 ppt.^{[2]} Population density depends heavily on landscape and temperature. Thus, local terrestrial runoff has a greater impact on their distribution than ocean processes.^{[3]} Acclimation to warmer temperatures may lead to a lower ability of sea hares to adapt to temperature changes, namely cold shocks.^{[1]}

== Ecology ==
Phyllaplysia taylori have limited mobility all throughout their life cycles due to direct development in their larval stage and a lack of swimming mechanism in their adult stage. Limited dispersal may lead to high levels of isolation in individual populations and potentially phenotypic differences.^{[3]}

Phyllaplysia taylori feed on epiphytes that live and feed on eelgrass, which can block the eelgrass from having access to sunlight and nutrients. Thus, as they clear away the epiphytes, eelgrass populations are able to grow more substantially.^{[2]} Phyllaplysia taylori therefore may play an important part in eelgrass community restoration efforts.^{[3]}

Possible predators include sunfish and sea stars of the genus Solaster.

== Reproduction and growth ==
Phyllaplysia taylori has two overlapping generations yearly, often spawning in summer and fall, with abundance altering in different areas. As a result, the size of the eggs of the eelgrass sea hares varies with season, with larger eggs spawning in fall and living longer than those hatching in the summers.^{[7]} The eggs are laid in parallel rows on Zostera. Eggs have double layers of egg capsules, each with a single ova and nutritional body.^{[4]} And as eggs develop, egg mass becomes darker. In early development, there is a total of eight cell stages, and unlike other sea hares, Phyllaplysia taylori undergoes direct development.^{[4]} After approximately one to three weeks, eelgrass sea hares hatch and feed actively.

Phyllaplysia taylori has a short life span, with those hatched in fall having an average lifespan of seven to eight months and those in summer having an average lifespan of three to five months.^{[7]} Research suggests that Phyllaplysia taylori is an annual animal, but the time and site that Phyllaplysia taylori dies is still unknown. Some suggest they die after mating; others believe they will return to the deep sea. Additionally, they reproduce multiple times a year even though they have a relatively reliable food source, which differs from those that reproduce only once a year.

=== Structural development ===
Most of the organs of Phyllaplysia taylori are developed in the larva. The circular velum is developed at the final larval stage, and the velar lobes are absorbed in the adult stage, similar to Calyptraea.^{[4]} Feet, and shell glands begin at the trochophore stage, with sensory cilia active after hatching and are on both sides of the surface of the foot.^{[4]} Larval shells are formed when velum starts folding back into two lobes, growing after hatching. However, if hatching is delayed, shells will start developing before hatching. Ring growth happens during post-hatching, and the body will grow larger than the shell.^{[4]} Phyllaplysia taylori is a sea hare that has adult shells.^{[5]} Nevertheless, the secondary development of the shell is still uncertain. The eelgrass sea hares have two larval kidneys, the primitive kidney, and the secondary kidney. The excretion function shifts from the primitive to the secondary kidney when developed. The primitive kidney is lost in adult stages, with the secondary kidney the permanent organ.^{[4]} Liver developed are not larval organs, and eyes are formed during the veliger stage.^{[4]}

One of the essential structures of sea hares is the stomach teeth. Since the tooth wears, Phyllaplysia taylori will renew the entire tooth in approximately 25 days, with a daily replacement of about 4.2% of the average total tooth height.^{[8]} Due to milling actions in eelgrass sea hares, the tooth growth rate is suggested to exceed their requirements.

== Taxonomy and phylogenetic relationships ==
In 1870, Fischer established the Phyllaplysia genus^{[7]} and studies have since continued with most recent studies estimating six species within the Phyllaplysia genus^{[6]}. However, the taxonomy of Phyllaplysia taylori has been a point of confusion and debate for researchers over the past six decades due to the inconsistencies in shell presence and coloring of Phyllaplysia. Researchers previously thought that the absence of a shell in Phyllaplysia was the only true way to differentiate it from the other two genera in Dolabriferinae. The confusion seems to come from using this definition in combination with the consistent reports of Phyllaplysia taxa with shells present. In addition, researchers in the early 19th century differentiated between members of the Phyllaplysia genera based on the presence of a shell and differences in color. Those that had a shell were originally considered a different species than those without a shell.^{[7]}

In Anaspidea, there are many variations of the shell, or lack thereof, so it is used as a characteristic to differentiate between taxa, genera, etc. The shell can either be absent or present, and if it is present it can be either external or internalized and, in some taxa, the presence of the shell can vary depending on the maturity of the organism. Part of the confusion comes from the fact that the presence or absence of P. taylori shells does not have to do with maturity or age, and it varies from population to population.^{[6]} ^{[7]}

In a recent phylogenetic analysis of the Aplysiidae clade, a single specimen of P. taylori was investigated and researchers found microscopic shell residue in addition to a shell gland and thus classified P. taylori primarily as taxa with shells present and members without a shell are considered secondary. This analysis of the characters and taxa within the Aplysiidae determined that Phyllaplysia taylori is a part of the Dolabriferinae subfamily, sister to the Notarchus subfamily. In addition to the Phyllaplysia genus, the genera Petalifera and Dolabrifera are also in the Dolabriferinae subfamily. This study only investigated one species, albeit, there is only one species, Phyllaplysia taylori, in the Phyllaplysia genus. Within the Dolabriferinae subfamily, Petalifera petalifera and Phyllaplysia taylori have a sister-taxonomic relationship with each other, and their clade is sider to Dolabrifera.^{[6]}
