= Dolabella =

Dolabella may refer to:

== People ==
- Numerous ancient Romans: see Cornelii Dolabellae
- Dado Dolabella, Brazilian actor, son of Carlos Eduardo Dolabella
- Jean Dolabella, drummer for the Brazilian heavy metal band Sepultura
- Pedro Dolabella, Brazilian professional footballer
- Tommaso Dolabella, painter

== Others ==
- Dolabella (gastropod), a genus of sea hares from the family Aplysiidae
