= Stylocheilus longicauda =

Scientific classification
- Kingdom: Animalia
- Phylum: Mollusca
- Class: Gastropoda
- Order: Aplysiida
- Family: Aplysiidae
- Genus: Stylocheilus
- Species: S. longicauda

Binomial name
- Stylocheilus longicauda (Quoy & Gaimard, 1825)

Synonyms
- Aplysia longicauda Quoy & Gaimard, 1825; Aplysia striata Quoy & Gaimard, 1832

Species of mollusc

Stylocheilus longicauda is a species of gastropods belonging to the family Aplysiidae.

The species is found in Caribbean, Indian and Pacific Ocean.
