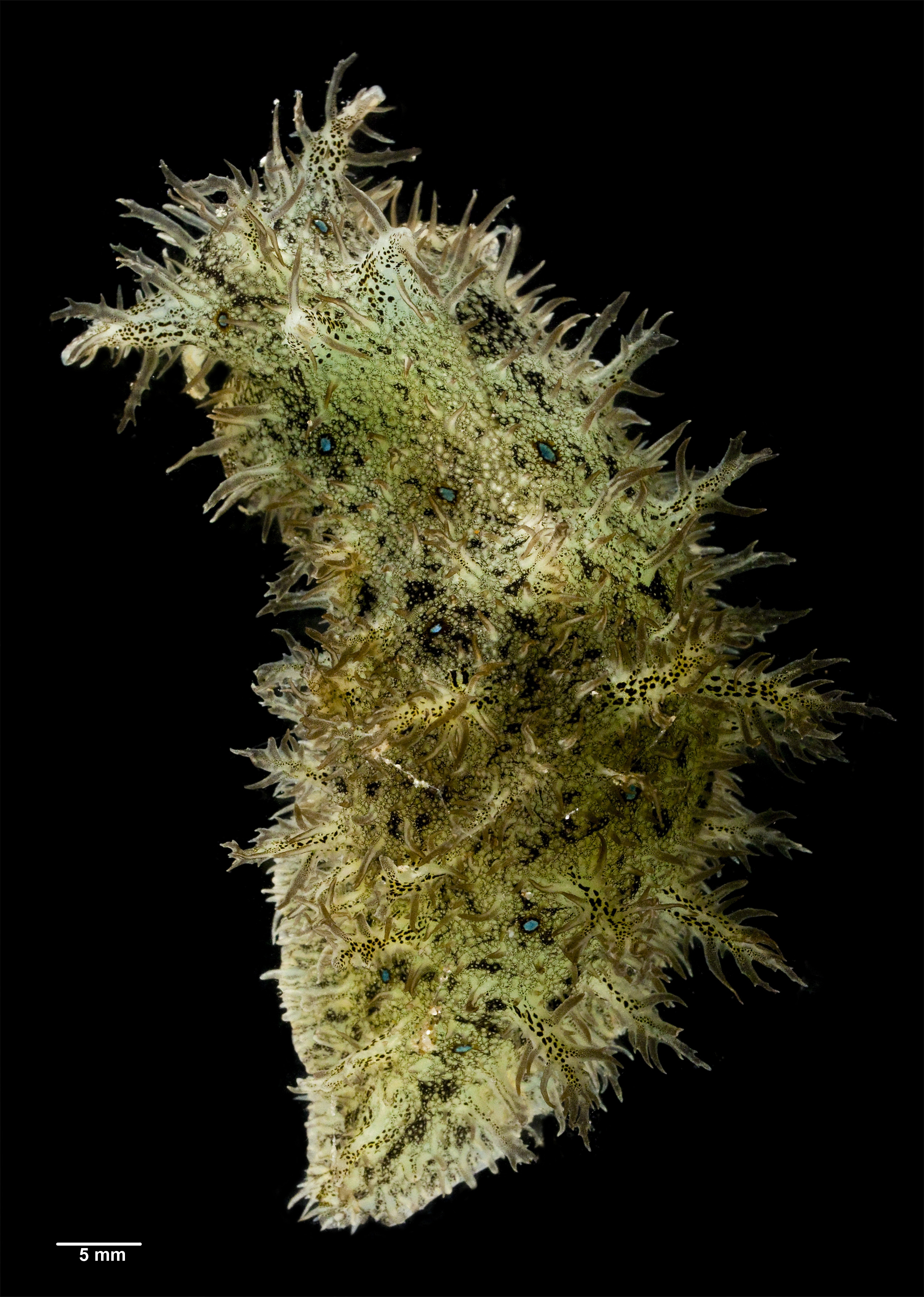
- From the collection of Auckland Museum

Scientific classification
- Kingdom: Animalia
- Phylum: Mollusca
- Class: Gastropoda
- Order: Aplysiida
- Family: Aplysiidae
- Genus: Bursatella
- Species: B. leachii

Binomial name
- Bursatella leachii Blainville, 1817

Synonyms
- Aclesia africana Engel, 1926; Aclesia freeri Griffin, 1912; Aclesia glauca Cheeseman, 1878; Aclesia rosea Engel, 1926; Aplysia bursatella Rang, 1834; Aplysia pleii Rang, 1828; Bursatella lacinulata Gould, 1852; Bursatella leachi [sic] (misspelling); Bursatella leachii africana (Engel, 1926); Bursatella leachii guineensis Bebbington, 1969; Bursatella leachii hirasei Eales & Engel, 1935; Bursatella leachii lacinulata Gould, 1852; Bursatella leachii leachii Blainville, 1817; Bursatella leachii pleii (Rang, 1828); Bursatella leachii rosea (Engel, 1926); Bursatella leachii savigniana Audouin, 1826; Bursatella savigniana Audouin, 1826 (original combination); Notarchus (Bursatella) leachii (Blainville, 1817); Notarchus pleii (Rang, 1828); Notarchus brevipes Hägg, 1904; Notarchus cirrosus Stimpson, 1855; Notarchus intrapictus Cockerell, 1893; Notarchus laciniatus Rüppell & Leuckart, 1830; Notarchus leachii (Blainville, 1817); Notarchus leachii cirrosus Stimpson, 1855; Notarchus savignyanus (Audouin, 1826); Notarchus villosus O'Donoghue, 1929; Ramosaclesia rex Allan, 1932

= Bursatella leachii =

Species of gastropod

Bursatella leachii, whose common name is the ragged sea hare or shaggy sea hare, is a species of large sea slug: a marine gastropod mollusk in the sea hare family Aplysiidae. It has an almost pantropical distribution, from the Mediterranean to the Caribbean, but excluding the central and eastern Pacific Ocean. Its long planktonic larval period and short life cycle make able to colonise new areas and increase dramatically in number if food supplies are favourable.

== Taxonomy ==
After Bursatella leachii was described in 1817 by Henri Marie Ducrotay de Blainville, numerous other species were added to the genus. In 1935 Eales and Engel synonymised these all with B. leachii, proposing six subspecies; one more was added by Bebbington in 1969, at which point Bursatella was considered a monotypic genus with a nearly pantropical distribution, containing the following subspecies:

- Bursatella leachii africana Engel, 1926 (South Africa)
- Bursatella leachii guineensis Bebbington, 1969 (Ghana)
- Bursatella leachii laniculata Gould, 1852 (Brazil)
- Bursatella leachii leachii Blainville, 1817 (Indo-Pacific)
- Bursatella leachii pleii Rang, 1828 (West Indies)
- Bursatella leachii rosea Engel, 1926 (West Africa)
- Bursatella leachii savigniana Audouin, 1826 (Red Sea)

These subspecies were supposedly distinguishable by "wooliness", their background colour, and the colour of their eyespots, though other observers found these traits varied within local populations and few consistent differences could be seen.

A 2020 molecular analysis by Bazzicalupo et al. found no consistent genetic differences between B. leachii subspecies, and recommended that this classification scheme be abandoned. In their view, B. leachii is a morphologically variable species with a pantropical distribution and limited gene flow between Indo-Pacific and Atlantic populations. Bazzicalupo et al. resurrected the name Bursatella ocilligera (Bergh 1902) for genetically-distinct specimens from the Philippines, and that same year Nimbs and Wilson described B. hirsuta from southern and western Australia, making three species in the genus Bursatella.

== Distribution ==
This species is more widely-distributed than any almost other species of heterobranch sea slug, being found in coastal areas of the Atlantic down to South Africa and parts of the Indo-West Pacific ocean. Although it spans 20,000 km of tropical waters from the Caribbean to Japan, it is absent from the central and eastern Pacific. It has been hypothesised that the Atlantic and Indian-Pacific populations could be intermittently linked by the Agulhas Current around the tip of South Africa, explaining the small divergence in genetic sequence between the two populations.

Geographical variation in B. leachii

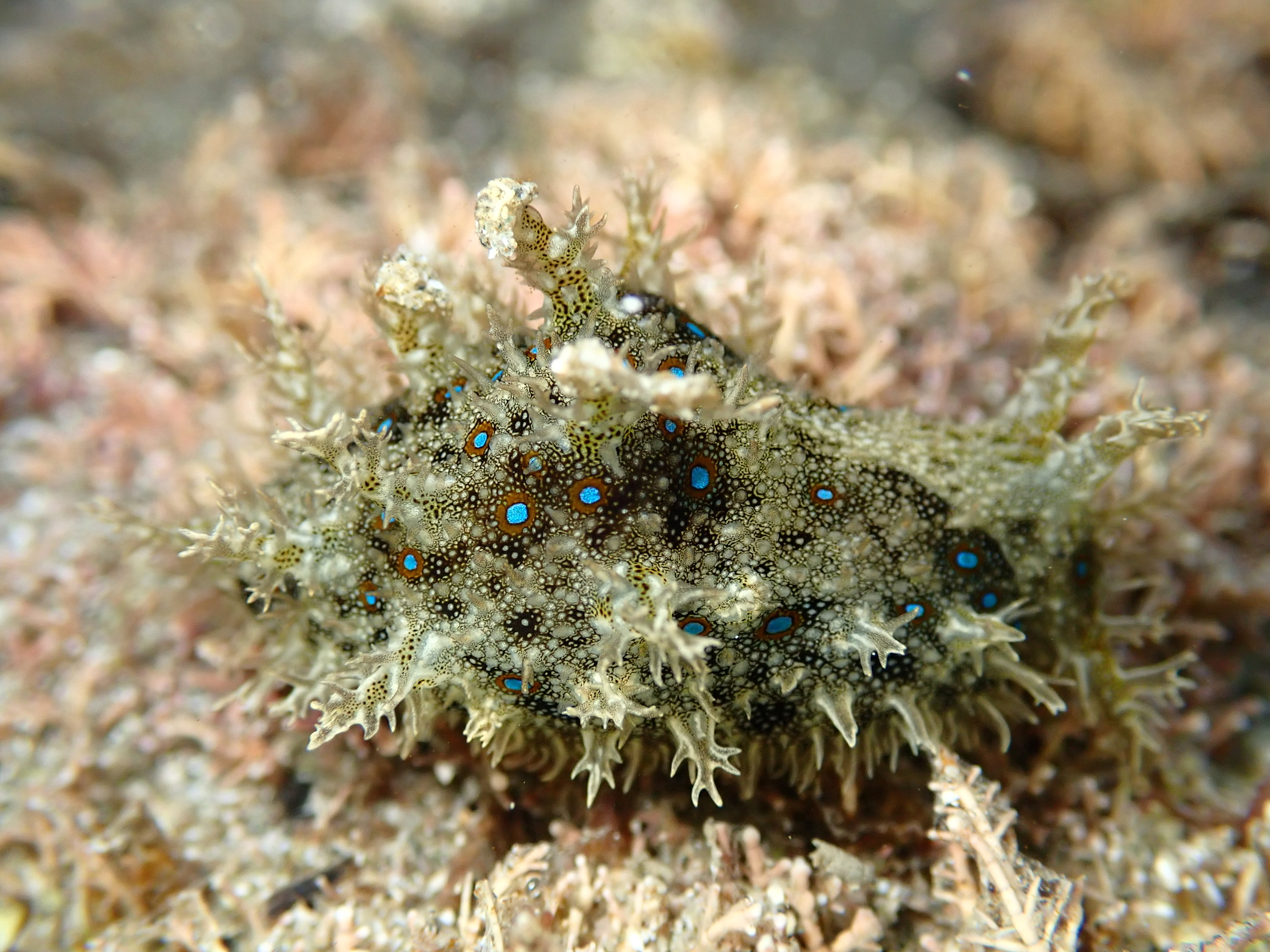
New Zealand

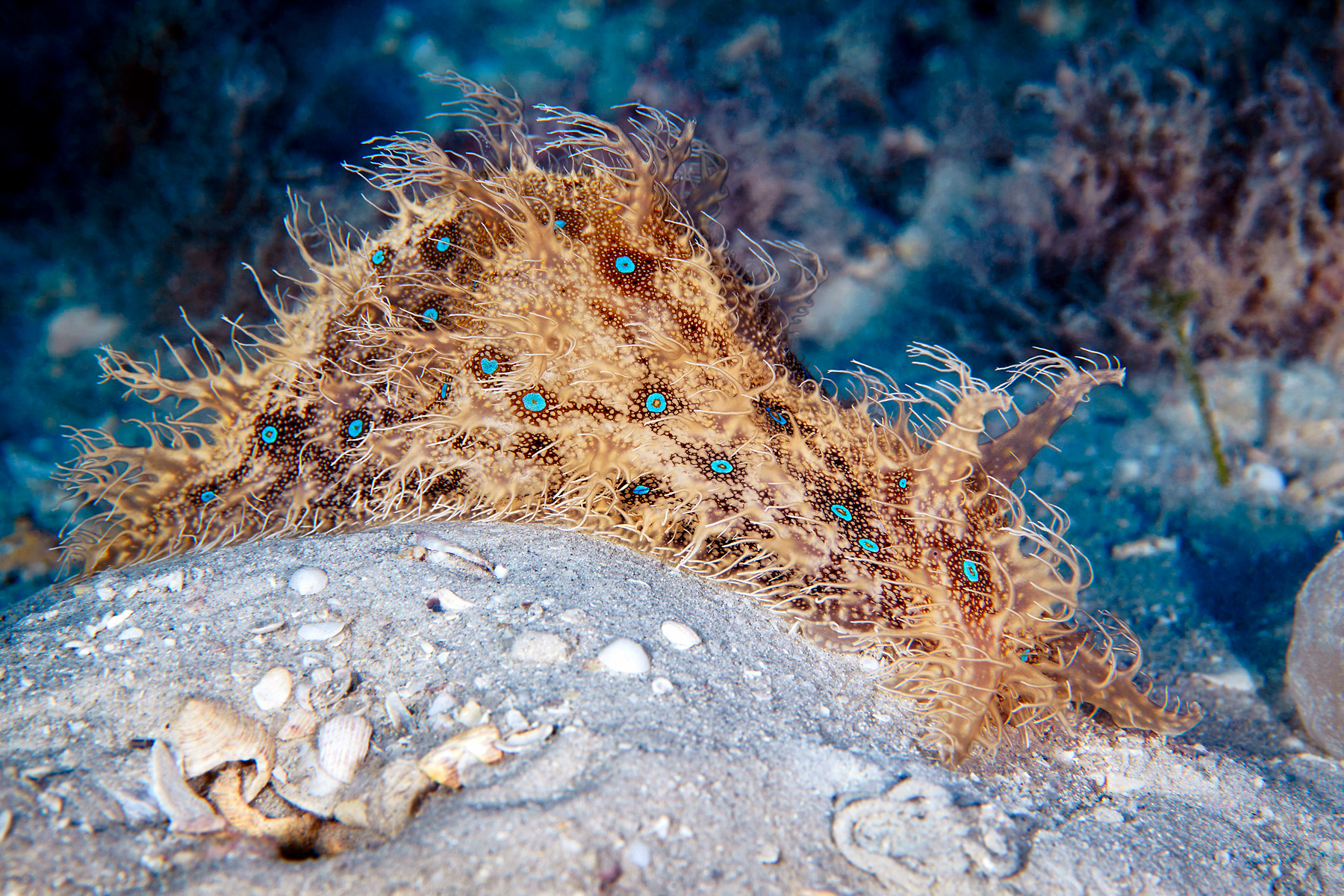
Australia

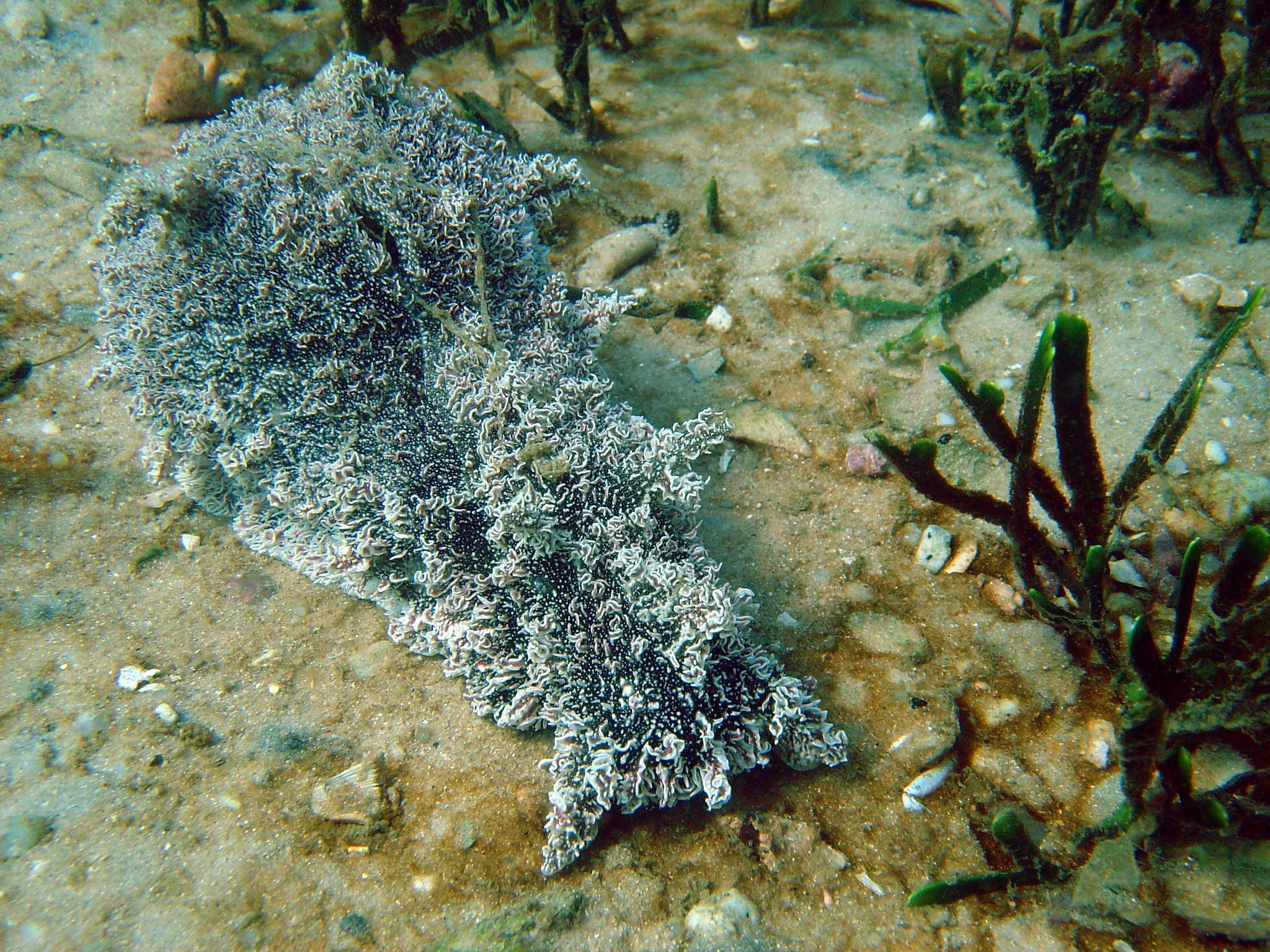
South Africa

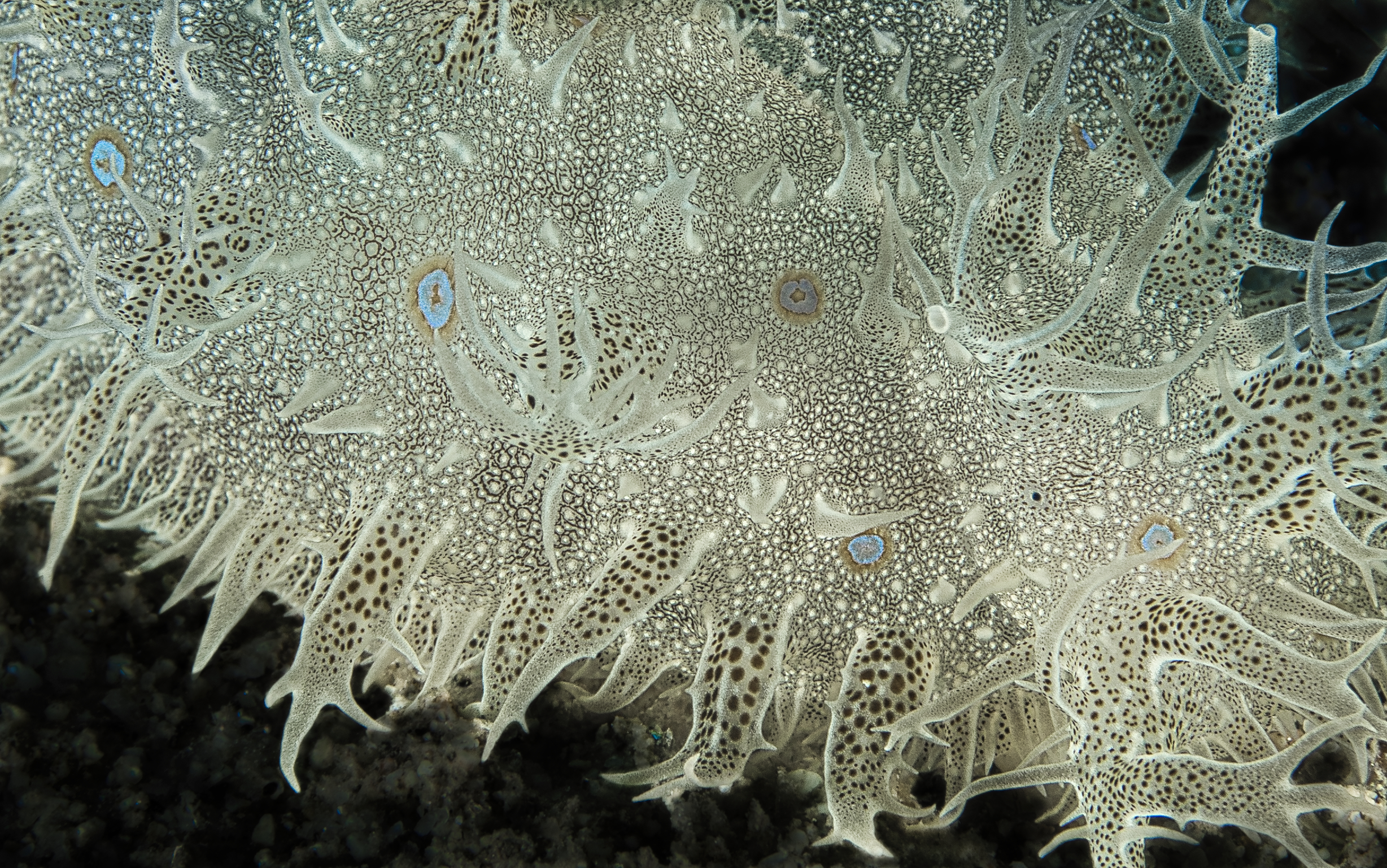
Bursatella leachii at Soverato, Italy

This species colonised the Mediterranean Sea in about the mid-20th century. It was first noted in the 1950s on the Levantine coast and Italy, reaching Morocco, southern Spain, and France in the 2000s. Because it was first noted from the eastern Mediterranean, the population was assumed to have originated in the Red Sea via the Suez Canal, but genetic sequencing revealed Mediterranean and Atlantic populations had almost identical haplotypes, meaning the species probably arrived from the Atlantic. Rather than being carried in ballast water like many other species invading the Mediterranean, B. leachii probably arrived naturally as sea surface temperatures that would normally prevent it entering the Strait of Gibraltar have shifted north with climate change.

== Description ==
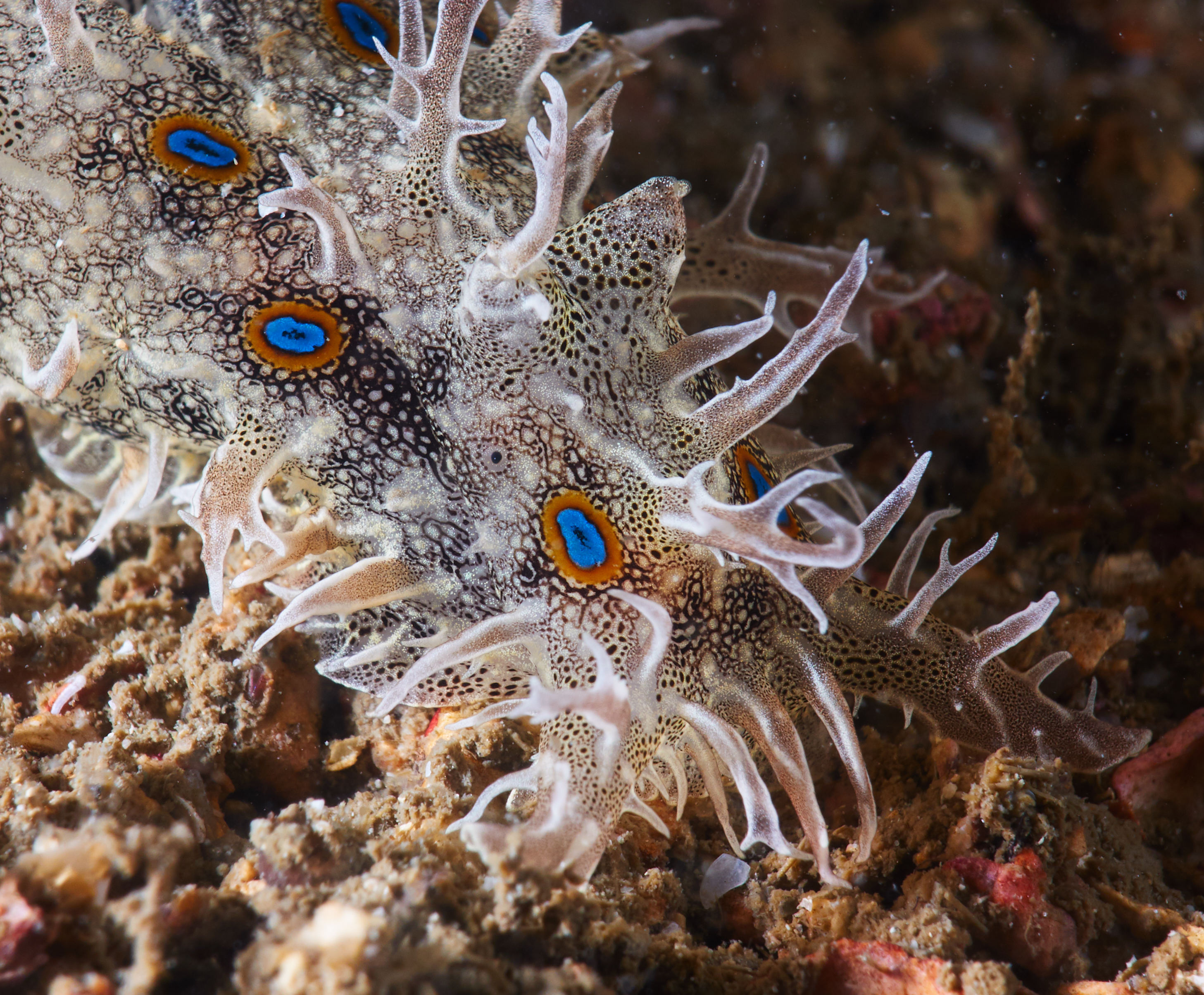
Head and anterior of Bursatella leachii (Hong Kong), showing blue eyespots

Bursatella leachii is green to greenish brown. It has a broad and short head. Its mantle is covered with papillae (finger-like outgrowths), which give it a thorny aspect. The mantle has a network-like pattern with blue eyespots (ocelli) in black spots and green areas. It moves slowly on a broad foot. There is short, sharp tail. The short parapodia (fleshy, winglike outgrowths) are fused on their rear end.

The maximum recorded length is 120 mm.

== Ecology ==
The species is usually found in protected marine bays and estuaries, tidal pools, occurring in the intertidal zone and down to at least 10 m. It is a benthic detritivore which grazes for food on muddy or sandy bottoms. Populations in the wild have been observed feeding on a range of macroalgae including the green alga Enteromorpha, as well as the cyanobacteria Calothrix crustacea, forming large populations in response to bacterial blooms.

This sea hare may be found in dense concentrations or singly; it follows a daily rhythm, assembling in groups at sunset and dispersing in the morning. These patterns are also followed in captivity, with copulation predominantly in the morning and feeding in the afternoon. The species lays egg ribbons in long green stringy tangles. After hatching the veliger larvae grow rapidly and reach full size at 15 days, and are able to metamorphose to adult form aged just 19 days (the shortest larval period reported for sea slugs), but can live as plankton for up to three months. Larvae metamorphose on cyanobacteria, taking 1–2 days, discarding their shell when they reach 2.5–3.0 mm long. Adults grow relatively quickly, attaining maturity at the age of 2 or 3 months after hatching.
