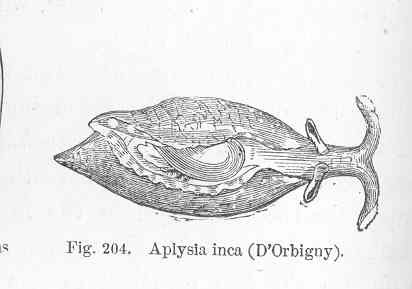

Scientific classification
- Kingdom: Animalia
- Phylum: Mollusca
- Class: Gastropoda
- Order: Aplysiida
- Family: Aplysiidae
- Genus: Aplysia
- Species: A. inca

Binomial name
- Aplysia inca A. d'Orbigny, 1836

Synonyms
- Aplysia (Varria) inca A. d'Orbigny, 1836 alternative representation; Aplysia chierchiana Mazzarelli & Zuccardi, 1889 junior subjective synonym (probable synonym)

= Aplysia inca =

Species of gastropod

Aplysia inca is a very large species of sea slug, more specifically a sea hare, a marine opisthobranch gastropod mollusk in the family Aplysiidae, the sea hares.

== Description ==
The type specimen measures 60 mm long, 17 mm wide and 26 mm high.

(Original description in French) The animal is moderately elongated, elevated, flaccid (mollasse), and highly ventricose (swollen). Its cephalic (head) region is elongated and supported by a very short neck. The buccal appendages are very long, very broad, flattened, and rolled upon themselves at their extremities, which are thin, sharp, and strongly rugose (wrinkled). The tentacles are long, subconical, obtuse (blunt), and cleft like a hare's ear at their tips. They are situated midway between the buccal appendages and the foot lobes. The eyes are visible, positioned anterior to the tentacles. The mouth lacks prominent lips (bourrelets) and is located in the inferior part of the furrow separating the two buccal appendages.

The foot is narrow, strongly rugose, swollen in its middle, and acuminated (pointed) posteriorly, projecting only slightly beyond its lobes. The foot lobes are very broad, united and strongly extended posteriorly beyond the gills, gradually tapering anteriorly. Their margins are thin, highly wrinkled, and almost incised (découpés).

The mantle is oblong, convex, and smooth, marked on its median part by a very small, rounded opening that communicates with the shell. It is rounded anteriorly, and posteriorly it extends into a very long, broad, greatly attenuated (thinned) tongue-like process, most often widely open. The gills are considerably shorter than this posterior extension of the mantle.

The shell is oval, very open, depressed, almost entirely corneous (horny), with a slight indentation. Its apex is elongated and only lightly encrusted.

The living animal exhibits a beautiful violet hue, with rounded white spots on the sides of the anterior part of the foot lobes. Several larger, more regular, oblong spots are spaced on the neck and cephalic region, often with two posterior to the tentacles and four anterior to them, on each side, aligned with the anterior junction of the foot lobes. The inner margin of the foot lobes is marked by a narrow, light violet-pink border, followed by large, very rounded or angular white blotches on a violet-brown ground. The mantle is uniformly violet, and the gills are a beautiful purplish-violet.

When preserved in alcohol, this species retains the distribution of all its spots, but its coloration becomes blackish and appears somewhat stippled with blackish dots. The shell is amber-colored (succin), with horny margins.

== Distribution ==
This marine species occurs off Peru.
