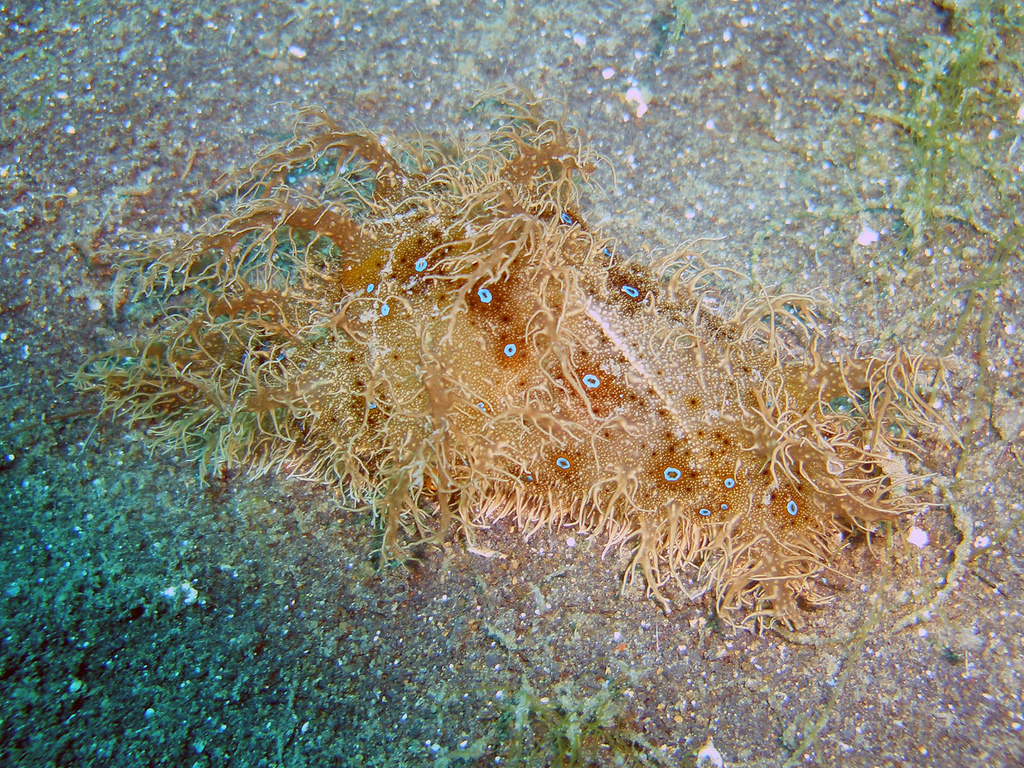
- Bursatella leachii

Scientific classification
- Domain: Eukaryota
- Kingdom: Animalia
- Phylum: Mollusca
- Class: Gastropoda
- Clade: Euopisthobranchia
- Clade: Anaspidea
- Superfamily: Aplysioidea
- Family: Aplysiidae
- Genus: Bursatella; Blainville, 1817

Type species
- Bursatella leachii Blainville, 1817

Species
- See text

Synonyms
- Aclesia Rang, 1828; Barnardaclesia Eales & Engel, 1935; Notarchus (Bursatella) Blainville, 1817; Ramosaclesia Iredale, 1929 ·

= Bursatella =

Genus of gastropods

Bursatella is a genus of sea slugs or sea hares, marine opisthobranch gastropod mollusks in the family Aplysiidae, the sea hares.

== Species ==
Species within the genus Bursatella include:

- Bursatella africana (Engel, 1926)
- Bursatella hirsuta Nimbs & N.G. Wilson, 2020
- Bursatella leachii Blainville, 1817
- Bursatella ocelligera (Bergh, 1902)

Synonyms

- Bursatella lacinulata A. Gould, 1852: synonym of Bursatella leachii Blainville, 1817 (junior subjective synonym)
- Bursatella leachi: synonym of Bursatella leachii Blainville, 1817 (misspelling - incorrect subsequent spelling)
- Bursatella savigniana Audouin, 1826: synonym of Bursatella leachii Blainville, 1817
