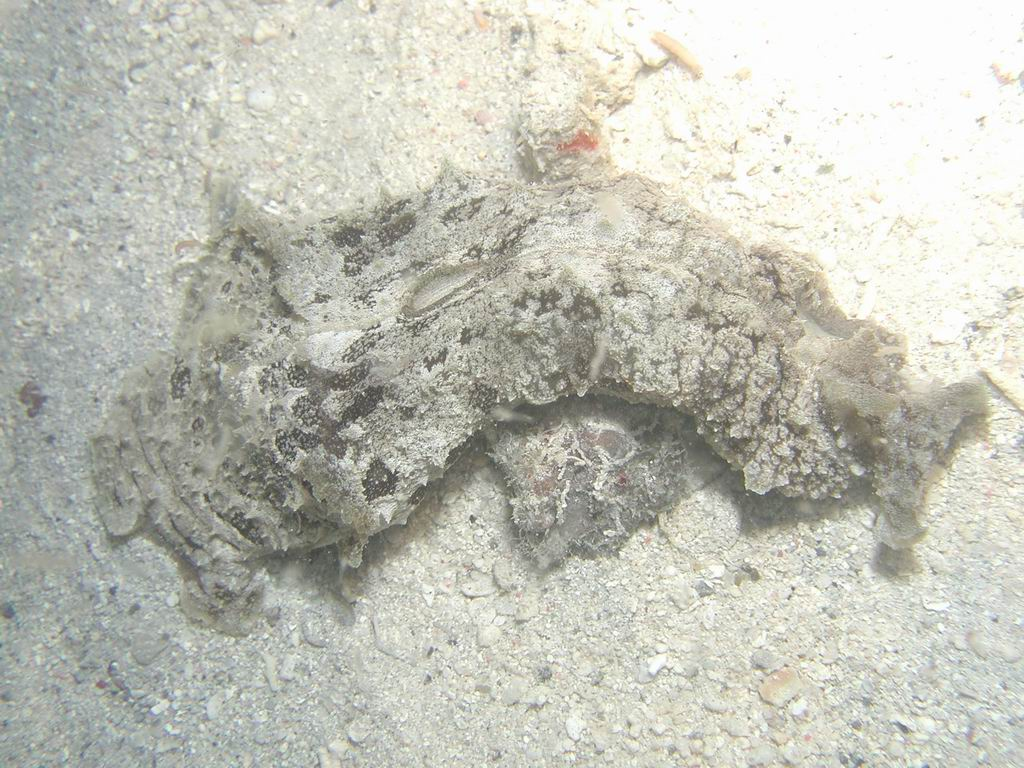
- Dolabella auricularia

Scientific classification
- Domain: Eukaryota
- Kingdom: Animalia
- Phylum: Mollusca
- Class: Gastropoda
- Clade: Euopisthobranchia
- Clade: Anaspidea
- Superfamily: Aplysioidea
- Family: Aplysiidae
- Genus: Dolabella; Lamarck, 1801

Type species
- Dolabella callosa Lamarck, 1801

Species
- †Dolabella aldrichi; Dolabella auricularia; Dolabella gigas

Synonyms
- Dollabella Gistl, 1848 (Missp.)

= Dolabella (gastropod) =

Genus of gastropods

Dolabella is a genus of sea slugs or sea hares, marine opisthobranch gastropod mollusks in the family Aplysiidae, the sea hares.

== Description ==
In the sea hares of the genus Dolabella the back end of the body has turned into a slanted disc-like shield, with a large, calcified shell buried inside. The color is variable, with specks of green and brown.

There are fossil records of † Dolabella aldrichi from the Early Miocene, found in the Chipola Formation in Florida

== Species ==
Species within the genus Dolabella include:

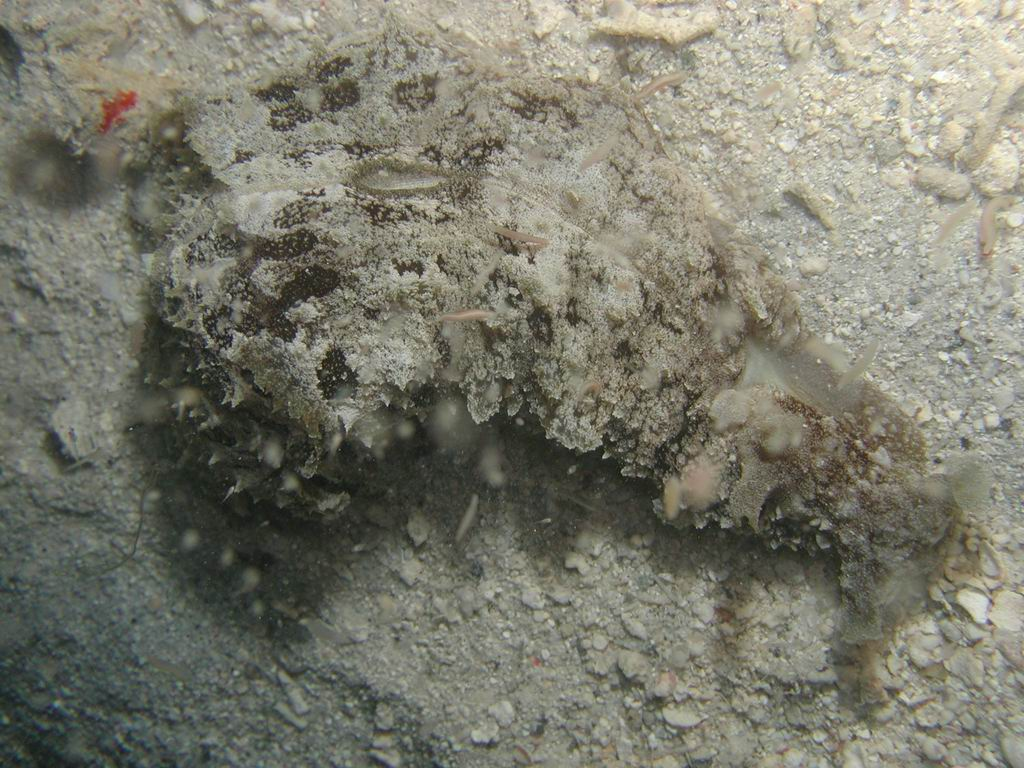
Dolabella auricularia

- † Dolabella aldrichi
- Dolabella auricularia Lightfoot, 1786 or Wedge Sea Hare
- Dolabella gigas Rang, 1828
  - Distribution : Indian Ocean.
  - Description : The internal shell has a saucer-shaped extension; armed penis

Species brought into synonymy

- Dolabella aldrichi Dall, 1890 †: synonym of Floribella aldrichi (Dall, 1890) † (original combination)
- Dolabella andersoni Allan, 1941: synonym of Dolabella auricularia (Lightfoot, 1786)
- Dolabella callosa Lamarck, 1801: synonym of Dolabella auricularia (Lightfoot, 1786)
- Dolabella cheni Sun, 1960: synonym of Dolabella auricularia (Lightfoot, 1786)
- Dolabella dolabrifera Rang, 1828: synonym of Dolabrifera dolabrifera (Rang, 1828)
- Dolabella ecaudata (Rang, 1828): synonym of Dolabella auricularia (Lightfoot, 1786)
- Dolabella fragilis Lamarck, 1822: synonym of Aplysia depilans Gmelin, 1791
- Dolabella gigas (Rang, 1828): synonym of Dolabella auricularia (Lightfoot, 1786)
- Dolabella hasselti Férussac in Rang, 1828: synonym of Dolabella auricularia (Lightfoot, 1786)
- Dolabella laevis Blainville, 1819: synonym of Aplysia depilans Gmelin, 1791
- Dolabella lepus Risso, 1826: synonym of Aplysia depilans Gmelin, 1791 (dubious synonym)
- Dolabella rumphii Blainville, 1819: synonym of Dolabella auricularia (Lightfoot, 1786)
- Dolabella scapula O'Donoghue, 1929: synonym of Dolabella auricularia (Lightfoot, 1786) (non-binomial)
- Dolabella variegata Pease, 1860: synonym of Dolabella auricularia (Lightfoot, 1786)
