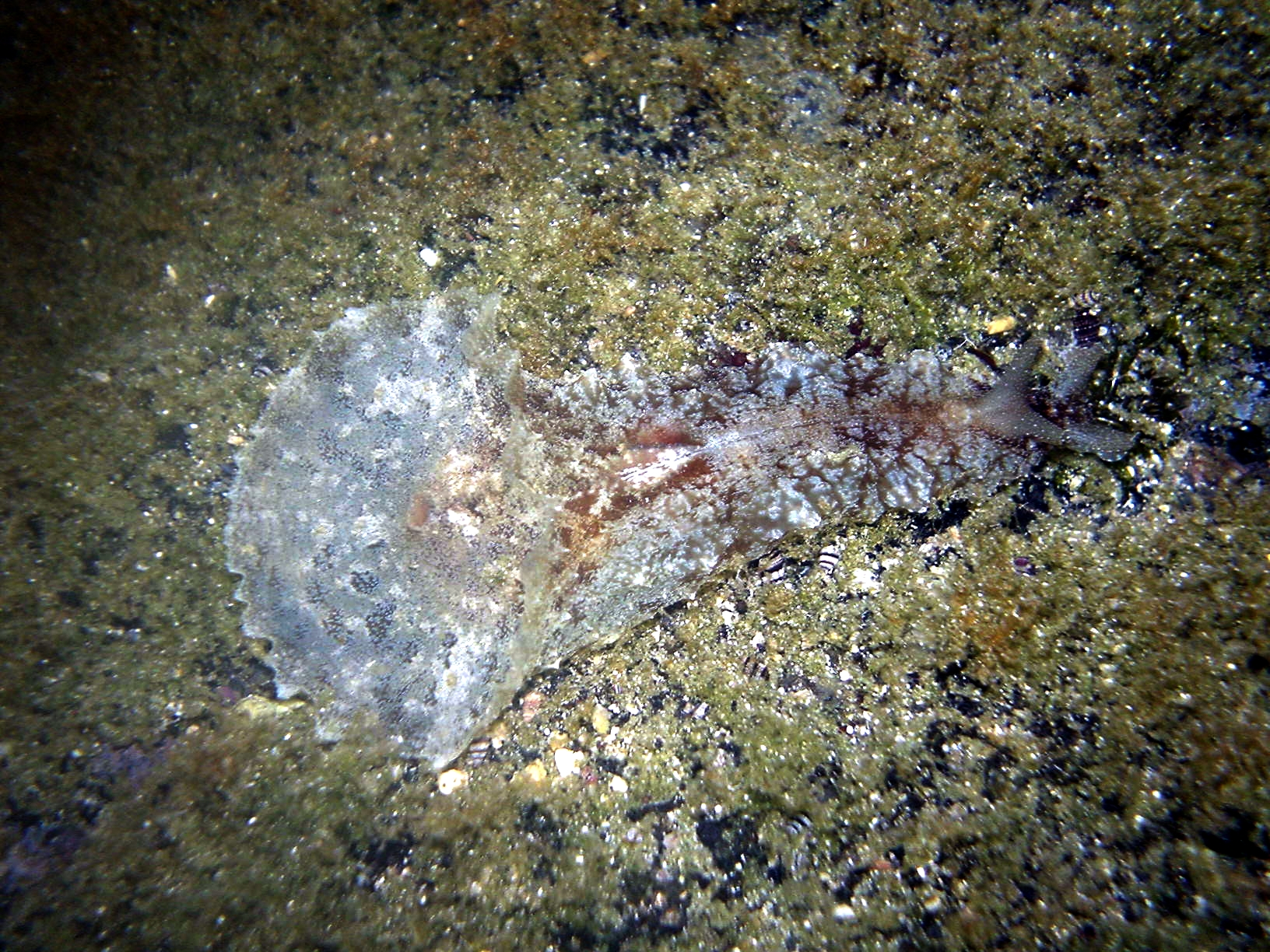
- Dolabella auricularia

Scientific classification
- Kingdom: Animalia
- Phylum: Mollusca
- Class: Gastropoda
- Order: Aplysiida
- Family: Aplysiidae
- Genus: Dolabella
- Species: D. auricularia

Binomial name
- Dolabella auricularia (Lightfoot, 1786)

= Dolabella auricularia =

Species of gastropod

Dolabella auricularia, also known as the wedge sea hare, is a species of large sea slug, a marine opisthobranch gastropod mollusk in the family Aplysiidae, the sea hares.

== Description ==
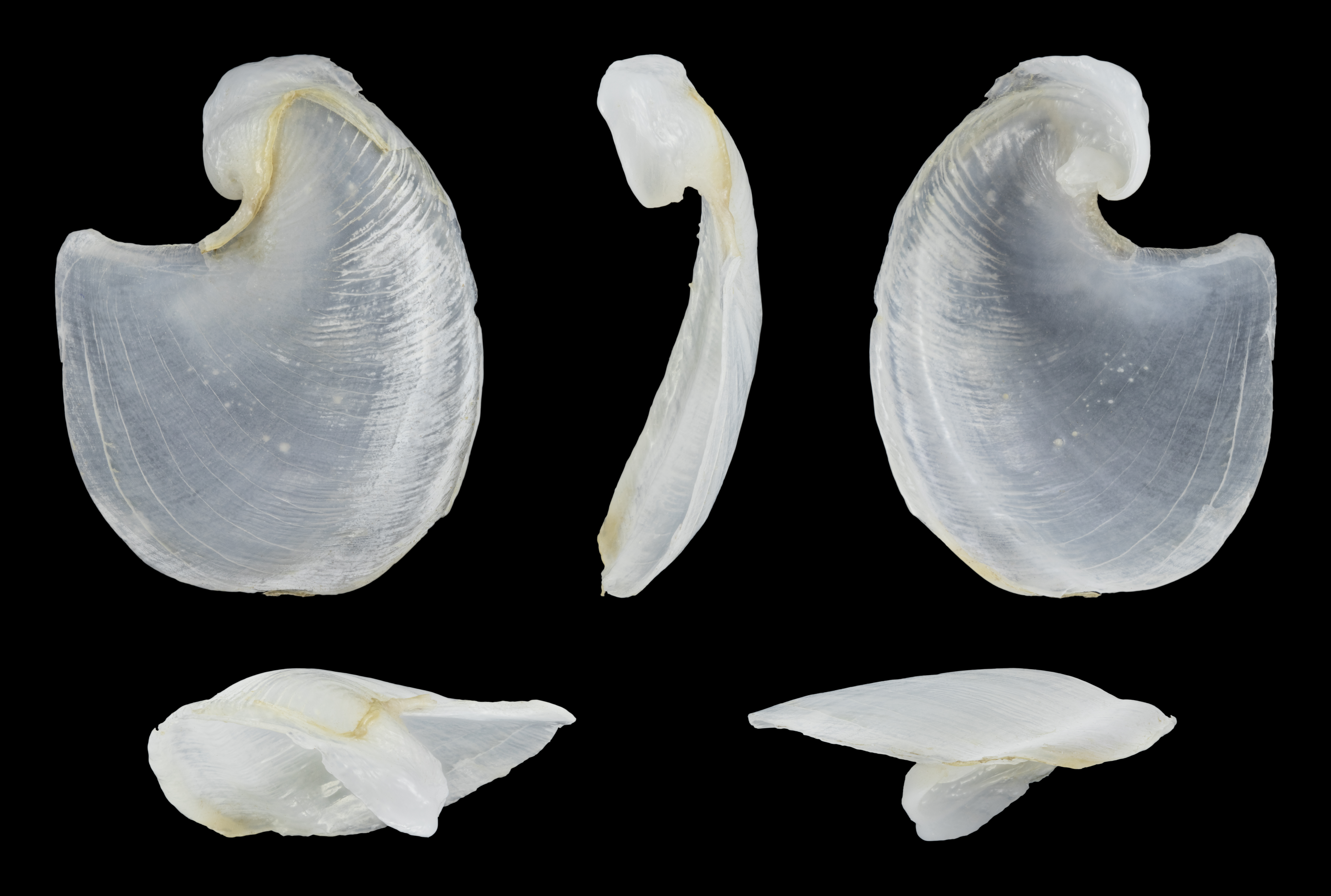

Dolabella auricularia is a rather large species which can reach a length of 40 centimetres (16 in). It can be recognized by a flattened disk on the posterior surface of the animal. This species can be found with soft pustules, leading to a rather knob-like appearance. It has a short, blunt head. Its body is covered with tubercles and skin flaps. The vestigial, internal shell has a typical ear-like form. Like all sea hares, it ejects a purple ink when disturbed.

== Distribution ==
Dolabella auricularia can be found in the Indian Ocean and the western and NW Pacific. It is also present in the Philippines.

== Habitat ==
This sea hare lives in areas that are sheltered from rough currents. They will often hide in seagrass, sand and mud, feeding on algae. Intertidal rock pools are also a favoured place to live.

== Human uses ==
In coastal areas in the Visayas and Mindanao islands in the Philippines, long strands of eggs of Dolabella auricularia (locally known as donsol or dongsul in the Visayan languages) are traditionally eaten. The egg strands are known as lokot or lukot and are harvested from shallow rocks and seagrass meadows. They resemble twisted noodles (pancit) in appearance and texture, hence why they are also called pansit-pansitan ("mock noodles") in some areas. They are usually green, but can be reddish to yellowish in color. They are often mistaken for seaweed and have a taste described as salty and sweet. They are usually eaten raw with vinegar and spices as kinilaw, sauteed like pancit guisado, or added to soups like fish tinola. ‍In Samoa it is called Gau (pronounced gnau). It is a favorite food for old people, cooked with coconut cream. Its innards are eaten raw. Its eggs are called ape and also eaten.

Dolabella auricularia is sometimes used by the keepers of large marine aquariums to limit algal growth in the tank.

The anti-cancer agent monomethyl auristatin E is derived from peptides found in D. auricularia.
