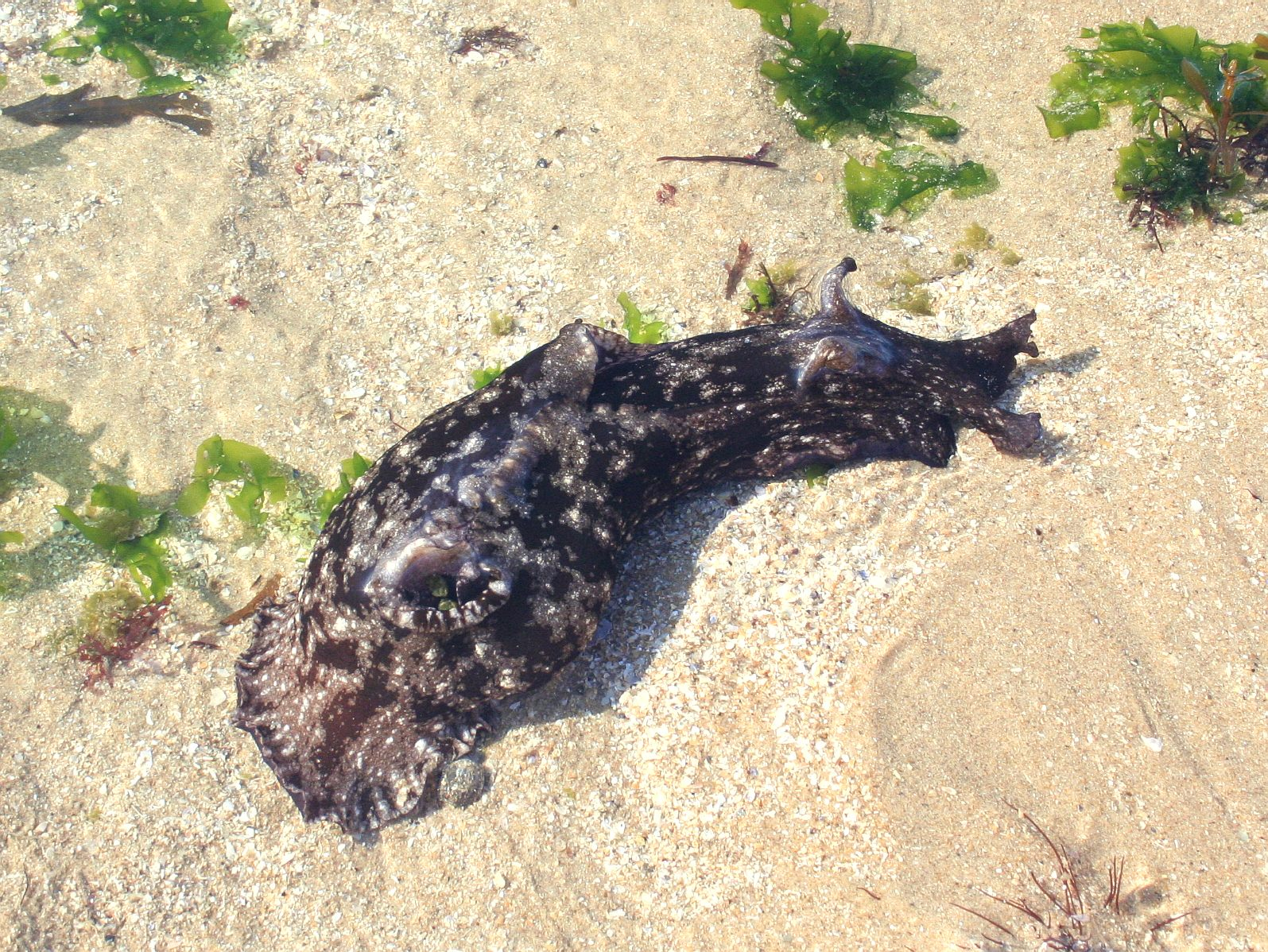

Scientific classification
- Kingdom: Animalia
- Phylum: Mollusca
- Class: Gastropoda
- Order: Aplysiida
- Superfamily: Aplysioidea
- Family: Aplysiidae
- Genus: Aplysia
- Species: A. depilans

Binomial name
- Aplysia depilans Gmelin, 1791

Synonyms
- List: Aplysia leporina Delle Chiaje, 1828; Aplysia major Lankester, 1875; Aplysia melanopus Couch, 1870; Aplysia petersonii Gray, 1828; Aplysia poli Delle Chiaje, 1824; Aplysia poliana [sic] (subsequent spelling of Aplysia poli Delle Chiaje, 1824); Dolabella fragilis Lamarck, 1822; Dolabella laevis Blainville, 1819; Dolabella lepus Risso, 1826 (dubious synonym)

= Aplysia depilans =

Species of gastropod

Aplysia depilans, the depilatory sea hare, is a species of sea hare or sea slug, a marine opisthobranch gastropod mollusk in the family Aplysiidae.

== Distribution ==
This sea hare occurs in the eastern Atlantic and the Mediterranean. It can be found mostly in shallow water of about 1.5 to 10 m. It avoids the intertidal zone because the animals cannot absorb atmospheric oxygen and so die after stranding relatively quickly. Occasionally some are trapped in tide pools at low tide. The adults feed primarily on algae of the genus Ulva, especially sea lettuce Ulva lactuca. During the planktonic phase of life they eat single-celled phytoplankton.

== Description ==
Individuals can grow up to 40 cm long and weighs up to 380 g. Their skin is dark brown to reddish brown, with white to light brown blotches. It has a yellow inner shell that is thinner, flatter and more poorly calcified than other sea hares and measures about 1.5 cm long.

The shell is oblong, ovate, smooth, and shining, displaying light radial grooves. Its interior is testaceous (shelly). The apex is incurved, reflected, and slightly calloused. The upper margin is excavated, reflected near the apex, and cuneate (wedge-shaped) at its extremity. The outer lip is slightly convex, while the dorsal margin is convex. The lower margin is scarcely excavated.

== Behavior ==
When threatened they emit a white or purple ink. Aplysia depilans are one of the seven species of the genus which are known to swim occasionally rather than crawl. Although hermaphrodites, they cannot self-fertilize and require a partner.

== Classical reference ==
The Greek Sophist Philostratus writes that the Roman Emperor Titus (died 81 AD) was poisoned by his brother Domitian with a sea hare and that his death had been foretold to him by Apollonius of Tyana. However, other classical sources such as Suetonius and Cassius Dio maintain he died of natural causes.
