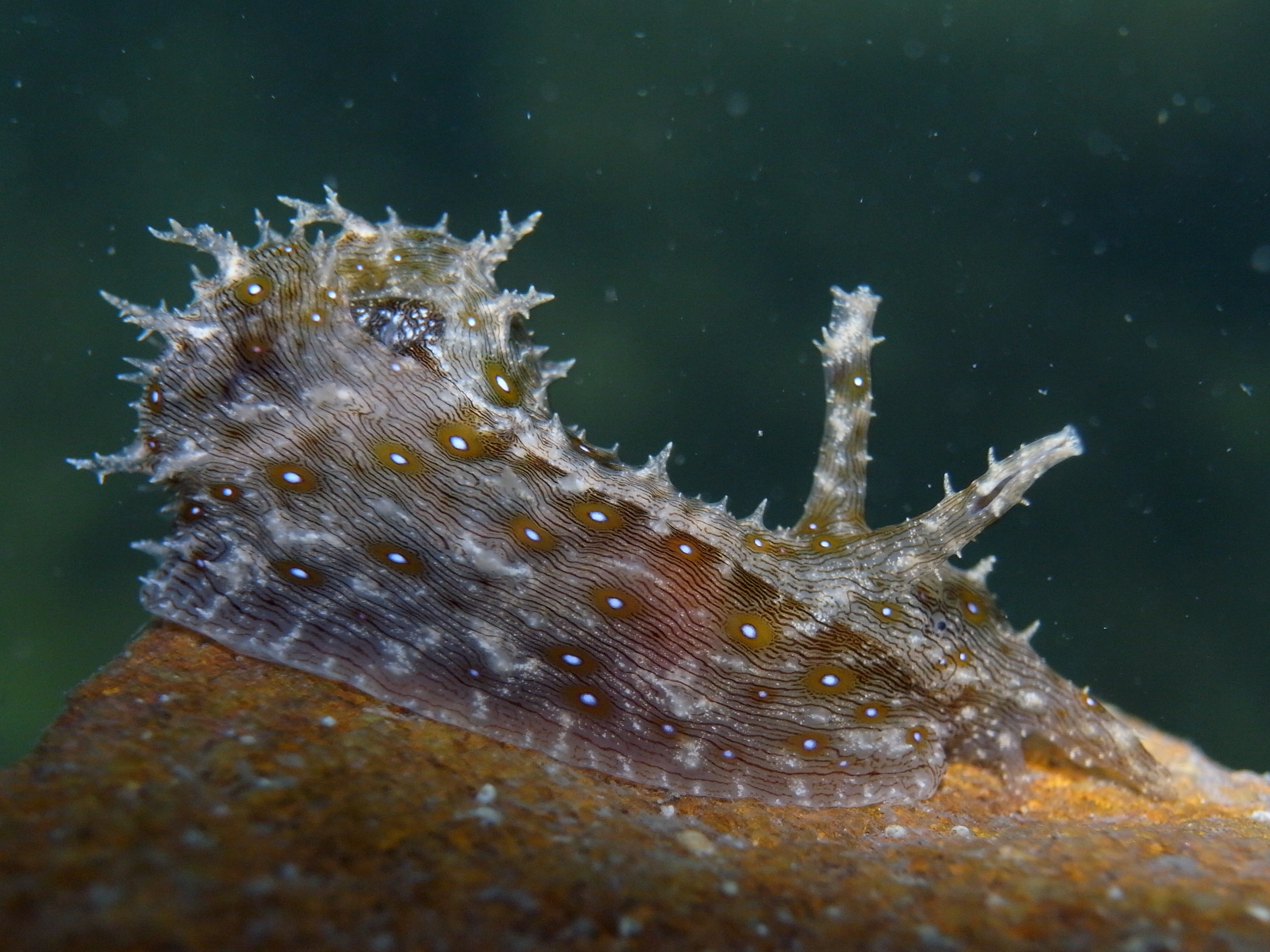
- Stylocheilus striatus

Scientific classification
- Kingdom: Animalia
- Phylum: Mollusca
- Class: Gastropoda
- Order: Aplysiida
- Family: Aplysiidae
- Genus: Stylocheilus
- Species: S. striatus

Binomial name
- Stylocheilus striatus Quoy & Gaimard, 1832

Synonyms
- Aclesia polyomma (Mörch, 1863); Aplysia striata Quoy & Gaimard, 1832; Notarchus lineolatus Stimpson, 1855; Notarchus stimpsoni Pilsbry, 1896; Stylocheilus lineolatus Gould, 1852; Stylocheilus quercinus Gould, 1852

= Stylocheilus striatus =

Species of gastropod

Stylocheilus striatus is a species of sea hare found in the Indo-pacific region living from the intertidal zone to a depth of 30 metres. Common names include lined sea hare, blue ring sea hare and furry sea hare. Mature animals can reach sizes of up to 65 mm in length and are brown in colour with blue spots. Their diet mainly consists of blue algae. They play an important role in controlling toxic blooms of the cyanobacterium Lyngbya majuscula.

== Description ==
This small sea hare has a cigar-shaped body and can reach a length of 6 to 7 cm (2.4 to 2.8 in). There is no shell, and the gills can be seen through the translucent brownish body, between the parapodia. The body has fine brown or green, longitudinal striations and spots, and there is a bluish central area. The eyes are at the base of the rhinophores and the head bears two pairs of tentacles. The body is covered with numerous simple or branched papillae.

== Distribution ==
Stylocheilus striatus has historically been considered to have a pantropical distribution, but morphological studies and molecular analysis have shown it to be a species complex consisting of three allopatric species; S. striatus is retained for the populations in the Indo-Pacific region, S. rickettsi is used for those in the eastern Pacific region, and S. polyomma for those in the western Atlantic region.

== Biology ==
Stylocheilus striatus is a specialist grazer on the toxic cyanobacteria Lyngbya polychroa and other species of Lyngbya. These cyanobacteria have long, unbranched filaments contained in rigid mucilaginous sheaths and form tangled mats in salt marshes and around atolls. Reducing this cyanobacterium is important for maintaining a balance on reef systems between algal dominance and coral dominance. Nutrient enrichment in coastal waters has resulted in blooms of these cyanobacteria. Besides this, raised levels of nitrogen, phosphorus and chelated iron have significantly changed the secondary metabolite concentrations in the cyanobacteria and this has changed the feeding behaviour of the sea hares that feed on them.

Stylocheilus striatus is a hermaphrodite. Two individuals exchange sperm shortly before egg-laying takes place; sometimes three or more individuals take part in a chain mating process. The eggs are enclosed in separate capsules connected together in gelatinous strings. In due course the eggs hatch into veliger larvae with small calcareous shells. After a short planktonic stage, these larvae settle on the substrate, undergo metamorphosis, losing their shells in the process, and become juveniles. Recent work has shown that the survival of both eggs and veligers can be negatively impacted by anthropogenic noise pollution, but the developmental rate of eggs is not affected.
