= Aplysia reticulopoda =

Scientific classification
- Kingdom: Animalia
- Phylum: Mollusca
- Class: Gastropoda
- Order: Aplysiida
- Family: Aplysiidae
- Genus: Aplysia
- Species: A. reticulopoda

Binomial name
- Aplysia reticulopoda Beeman, 1960

Species of gastropod

Aplysia reticulopoda is a species of gastropod mollusc in the genus Aplysia, family Aplysiidae.

== Description ==
The length of the species attains 193 mm. It is 122 mm wide and 82 mm high.

== Distribution ==
This marine species occurs off Southern California.
