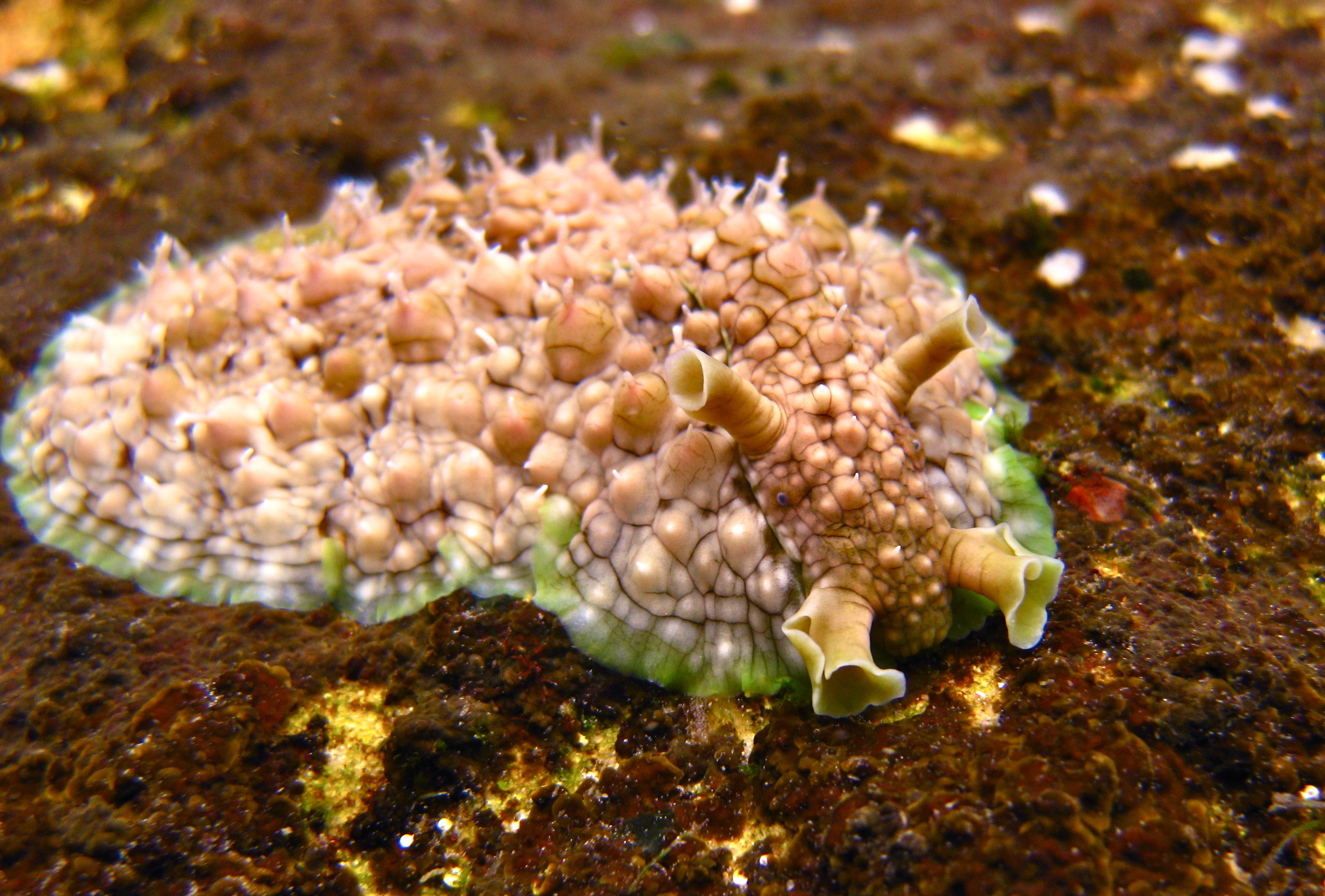

Scientific classification
- Kingdom: Animalia
- Phylum: Mollusca
- Class: Gastropoda
- Order: Aplysiida
- Family: Aplysiidae
- Genus: Dolabrifera
- Species: D. brazieri

Binomial name
- Dolabrifera brazieri Sowerby II, 1870

= Dolabrifera brazieri =

Species of gastropod

Dolabrifera brazieri is a species of sea slug or sea hare, a marine opisthobranch gastropod mollusc in the family Aplysiidae, the sea hares. It is native to the South Pacific, including southeast Australia.

== Books ==
- Powell A. W. B., New Zealand Mollusca, William Collins Publishers Ltd, Auckland, New Zealand 1979 ISBN 0-00-216906-1
