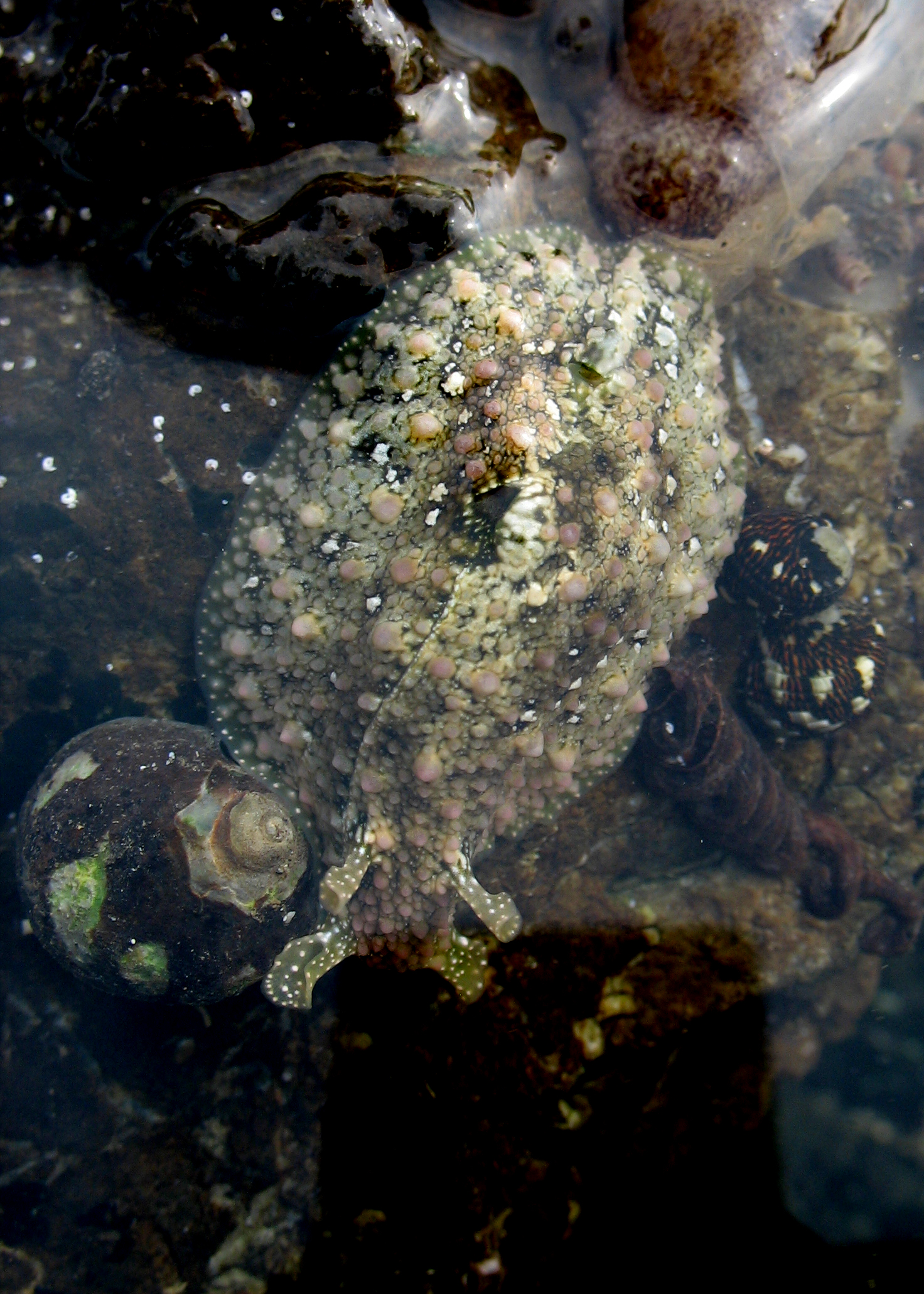
- Dolabrifera nicaraguana, submerged, found in a tide pool on a reef off Playa Negra, Costa Rica
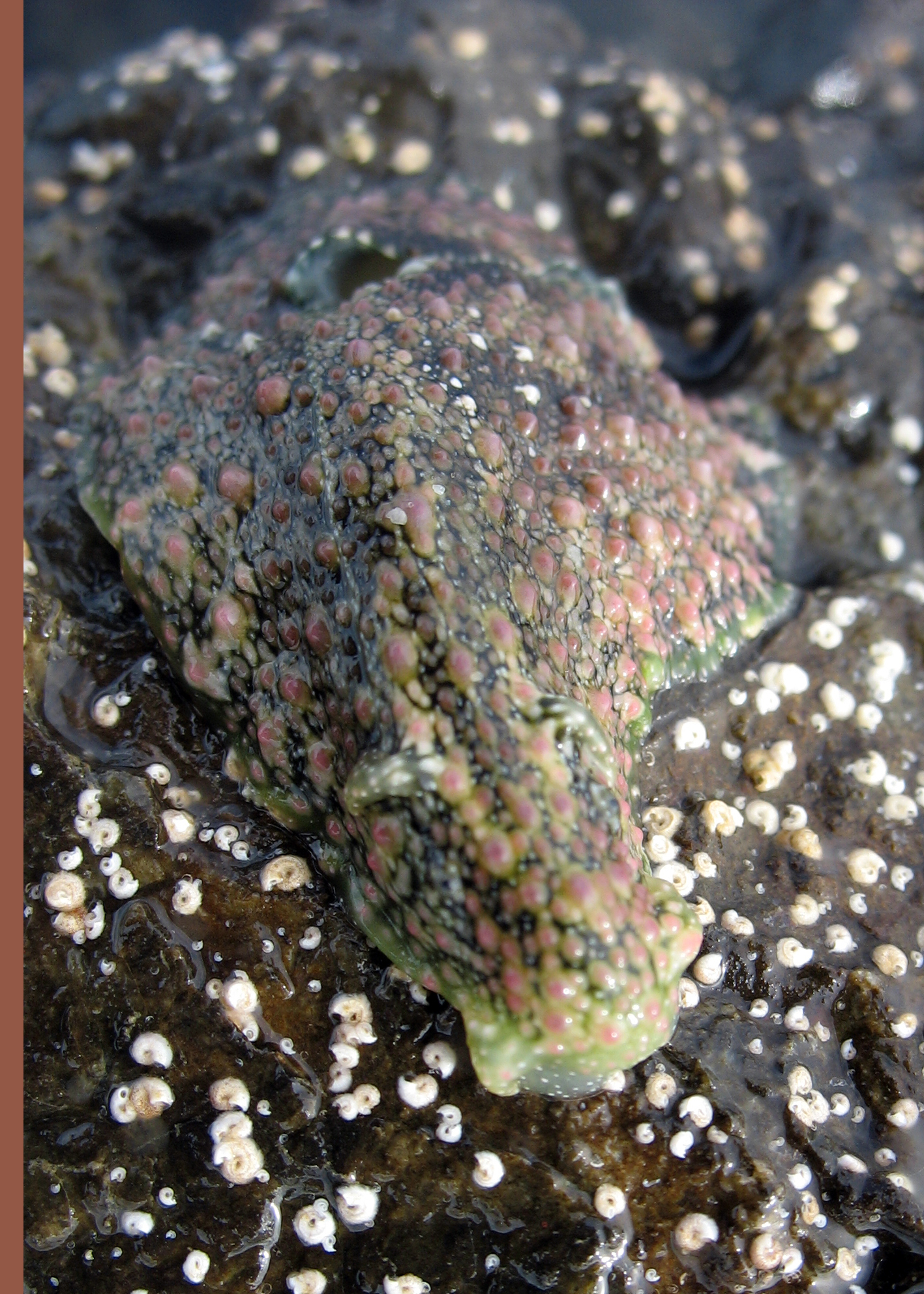
- Dolabrifera nicaraguana, out of water, found in a tide pool on a reef off Playa Negra, Costa Rica

Scientific classification
- Domain: Eukaryota
- Kingdom: Animalia
- Phylum: Mollusca
- Class: Gastropoda
- Clade: Euopisthobranchia
- Clade: Anaspidea
- Superfamily: Aplysioidea
- Family: Aplysiidae
- Genus: Dolabrifera
- Species: D. nicaraguana

Binomial name
- Dolabrifera nicaraguana Pilsbry, 1896

= Dolabrifera nicaraguana =

Tropical species of sea hare

Dolabrifera nicaraguana is a tropical species of sea hare found in the Eastern Pacific Ocean.
