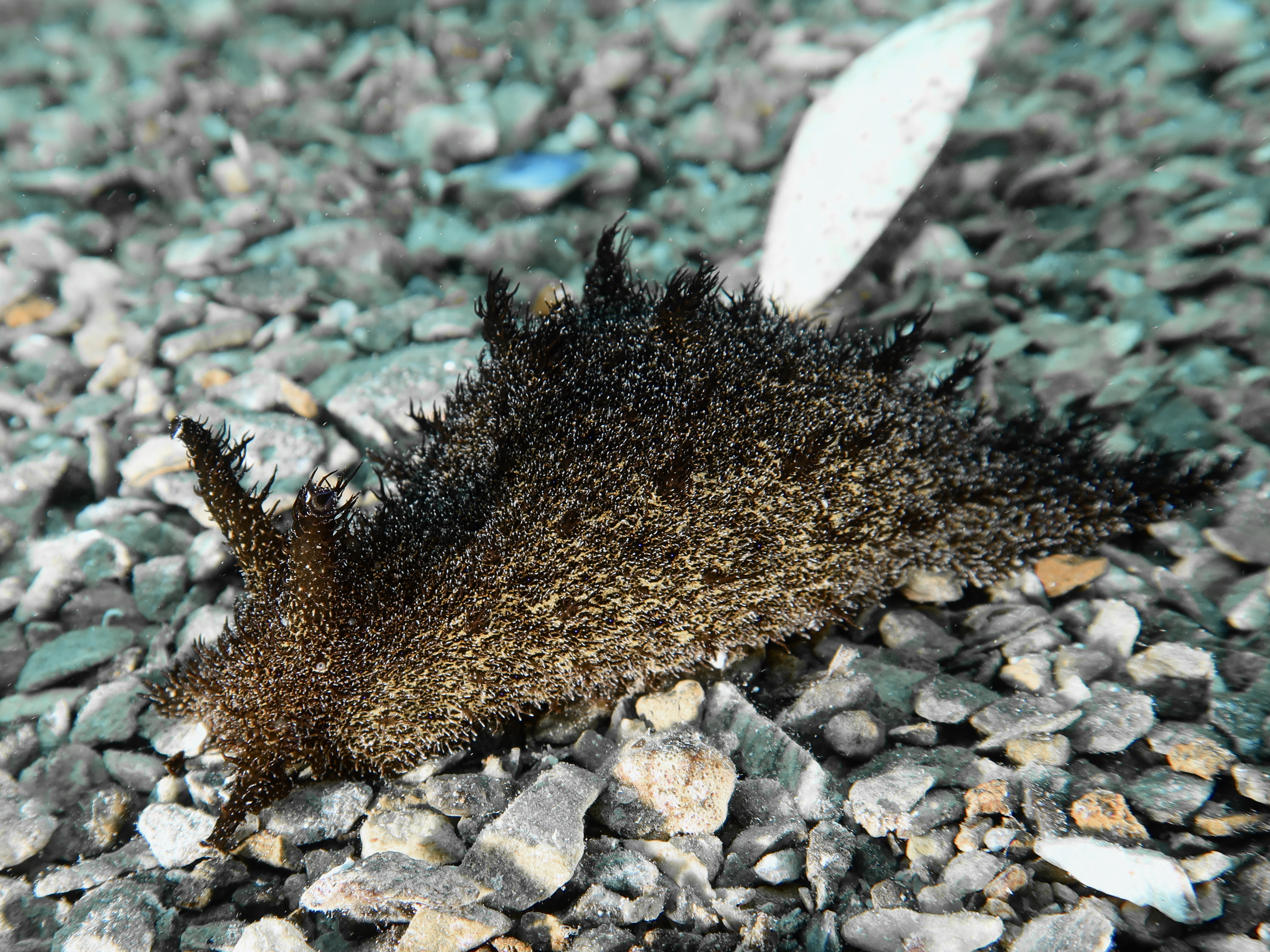
- B. hirsuta, Rapid Bay, South Australia

Scientific classification
- Kingdom: Animalia
- Phylum: Mollusca
- Class: Gastropoda
- Order: Aplysiida
- Family: Aplysiidae
- Genus: Bursatella
- Species: B. hirsuta

Binomial name
- Bursatella hirsuta Nimbs & Wilson, 2020

= Bursatella hirsuta =

Species of gastropod

Bursatella hirsuta is a species of large sea slug or sea hare, a marine gastropod mollusk in the family Aplysiidae, the sea hares.

== Distribution ==
This species occurs on the south coast of Australia and in Western Australia, where it was previously mistaken for Bursatella leachii. The adult has a distinctive humped back and all-over brown hairy projections, finer than those in B. leachii, but juveniles of the two species are easily confused. Its range apparently overlaps with B. leachii in central Victoria.

Bursatella hirsuta, Woodman Point, Western Australia, 2017, paratype
