= Aplysioviolin =

Identifiers
CAS Number	15265-71-1
3D model (JSmol)	Interactive image
ChemSpider	58828657
PubChem CID	101146591; 101146592
CompTox Dashboard (EPA)	DTXSID10714762
- InChI: InChI=1S/C34H40N4O6/c1-8-21-20(6)33(42)38-28(21)15-26-18(4)23(10-12-31(39)40)29(36-26)16-30-24(11-13-32(41)44-7)19(5)25(35-30)14-27-17(3)22(9-2)34(43)37-27/h8-9,15-16,20,27,35-36H,2,10-14H2,1,3-7H3,(H,37,43)(H,39,40)/b21-8+,26-15?,29-16?/t20-,27-/m1/s1 Key: QTKXLHIVFZPNBG-YLZFFTCBSA-N
- SMILES: CC=C1C(C(=O)N=C1C=C2C(=C(C(=CC3=C(C(=C(N3)CC4C(=C(C(=O)N4)C=C)C)C)CCC(=O)OC)N2)CCC(=O)O)C)C

Properties
Chemical formula	C_{34}H_{40}N_{4}O_{6}
Molar mass	600.716 g·mol^{−1}
Appearance	Purple
- Except where otherwise noted, data are given for materials in their standard state (at 25 °C [77 °F], 100 kPa). Infobox references

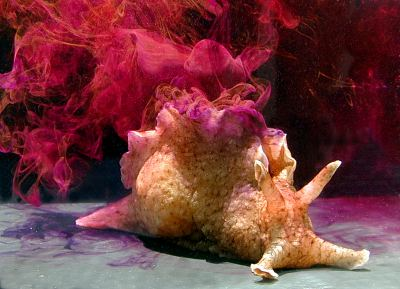
Aplysia californica secreting ink containing aplysioviolin.

Aplysioviolin is a purple-colored molecule secreted by sea hares of the genera Aplysia and Dolabella to deter predators. Aplysioviolin is a chemodeterrent, serving to dispel predators on olfactory and gustatory levels as well as by temporarily blinding predators with the molecule's dark color. Aplysioviolin is an important component of secreted ink and is strongly implicated in the sea hares' predatory escape mechanism. While the ink mixture as a whole may produce dangerous hydrogen peroxide and is relatively acidic, the aplysioviolin component alone has not been shown to produce human toxicity.

== Biosynthetic origin ==
Aplysioviolin is a metabolic product of Aplysia californica species of sea hare, and is a major component to its ink mixture. Sea hares first consume red algae as nutriment, and extract from it the light-harvesting pigment phycoerythrin, cleaving it to separate the red-colored chromophore phycoerythrobilin from its covalently-bound protein structure. The sea hare then methylates one of phycoerythrobilin's two carboxylic acid functional groups to form aplysioviolin, which is concentrated and then stored in the ink gland.

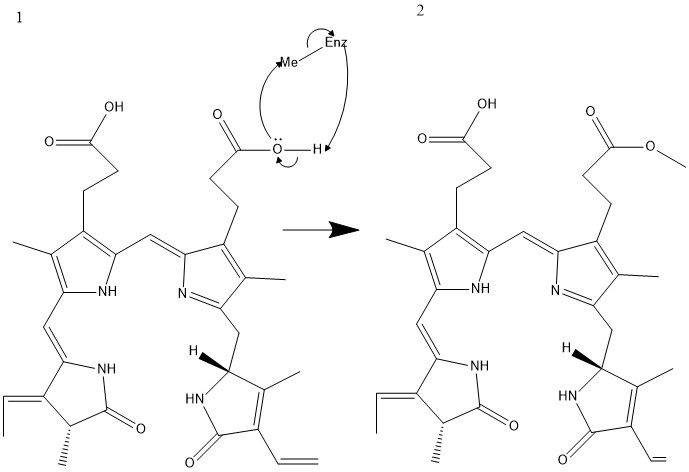
Chemical mechanism for aplysioviolin biosynthesis. An enzyme provides a methyl group that the right-sided hydroxyl selectively attacks, forming the methyl-ester moiety that characterizes aplysioviolin.

== Mechanism of action ==
Aplysioviolin, when squirted or otherwise exposed to predators, causes avoidance behavior that allows the sea hare to escape from being eaten. While its effects on predatory behavior have been investigated, the precise enzymatic targets of aplysioviolin are as of yet unknown. The behavioral effects of aplysioviolin have been especially characterized in blue crabs, whose feeding behavior is relatively easy to observe. In addition however, aplysioviolin has been shown to deter the approach of spiny lobsters, sea catfish, and other fish and crustacean species. The sea anemone Anthopleura sola has also been shown to retract its feeding protrusions when exposed to aplysioviolin. Aplysioviolin is known to be the major chemodeterrent compound in Aplysia but it is not the only one; both opaline and phycoerythrobilin have been shown to carry chemodeterrant effects, although they are less potent than aplysioviolin. Concentrations of aplysioviolin and phycoerythrobilin in ink are dependent on species: one study showed a 9:1 ratio (27 mg/mL and 3 mg/mL) of aplysioviolin to phycoerythrobilin in A. californica, and a 3.4:1 ratio (2.4 mg/mL and 0.7 mg/mL) for A. dactylomela. Aplysioviolin is often released with escapin in ink, which catalyzes conversion of ink metabolites into hydrogen peroxide, which is an additional deterrent of predators.

== History ==
Aplysioviolin, along with the other components of sea hare ink, has been utilized as a dye since antiquity. Aplysioviolin in particular has been implicated in classical-age dyeing, and has recently been the subject of investigation as the ancient tekhelet (תְּכֵלֶת) dye of Hebrew and other Mediterranean civilizations, though it remains one of several possible historical contenders. Aplysioviolin was first specifically isolated and characterized as a pH-dependent color-changing zoochrome by Lederer & Huttrer in 1942. A first structure was proposed by Rüdiger in 1967 using a chromic-acid based microdegredation technique. This technique was similarly applied in the years following to characterize the structures of the related compounds phycoerythrobilin and phycocyanobilin. The 1967 proposed structure was later modified to remove an angular hydroxyl group at the 7' position, and the final structure was given by Rüdiger & O'Carra in 1969.

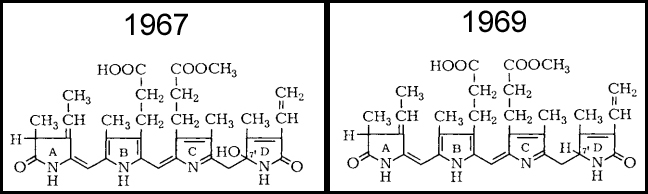
Diagram of Rüdiger's two structural elucidations of aplysioviolin. Note the difference between the -OH and -H functional groups on the 7' carbon.

== Human applications ==
The principal application of aplysioviolin has been historically in dyeing textiles. Aplysioviolin, in contrast to other more widely-used dyes, is considered a light-sensitive arylmethane dye, and is thus known for fading over time. Other pigments have been similarly extracted from marine animals, including Tyrian purple (6,6-dibromoindigo), from Murex purpuream shellfish, and additionally used as dyes.

Aplysioviolin has seen renewed interest in recent years due to its application to medicine and optical microscopy. Especially given its chirality, aplysioviolin and other natural compounds may serve as useful tools for stereoselective drug production and directed optical polarization. Within the past decade, aplysioviolin has additionally been hypothesized to confer medical pharmacodynamic effects. While as of yet uncharacterized in humans, the bioactive effects seen in fish are hypothesized to be recapitulated in some form in mammalian organisms.
