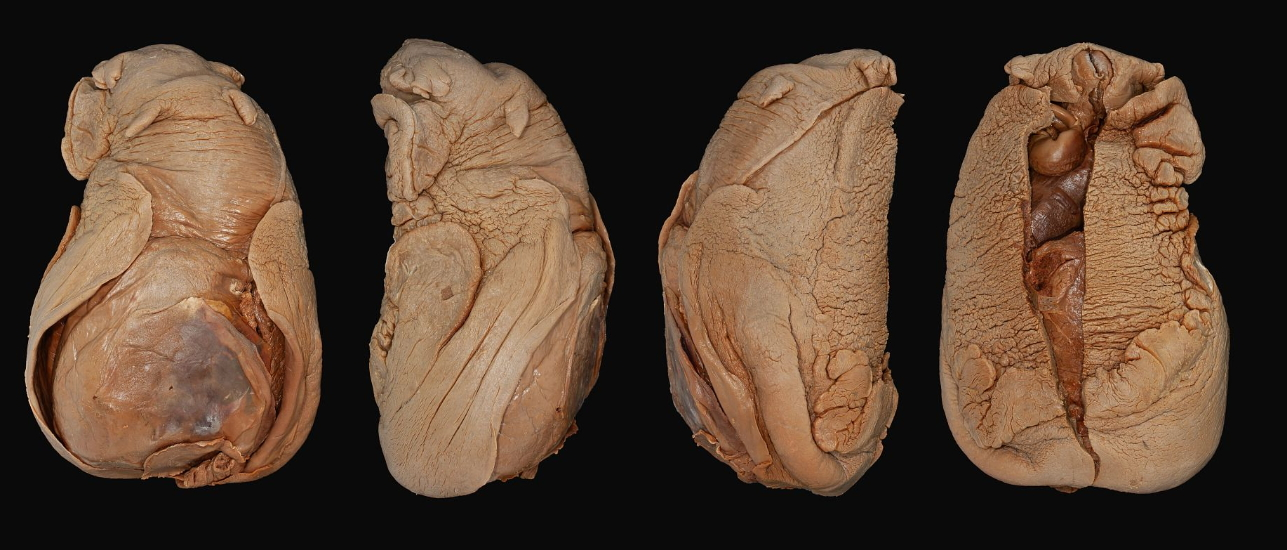
- Preserved specimen of Aplysia cedrosensis at the Smithsonian Institution (holotype)

Scientific classification
- Kingdom: Animalia
- Phylum: Mollusca
- Class: Gastropoda
- Order: Aplysiida
- Family: Aplysiidae
- Genus: Aplysia
- Species: A. cedrocensis

Binomial name
- Aplysia cedrocensis Bartsch & Rehder, 1939

= Aplysia cedrocensis =

Species of gastropod

Aplysia cedrocensis is a species of gastropod mollusc in the genus Aplysia, family Aplysiidae.

== Description ==
This is a large, heavily built creature, notably broad and tall. Its length is 165 mm, its width 90 mm, its height 85 mm.

== Distribution ==
This species was discovered off Cedros Island, Lower California.
