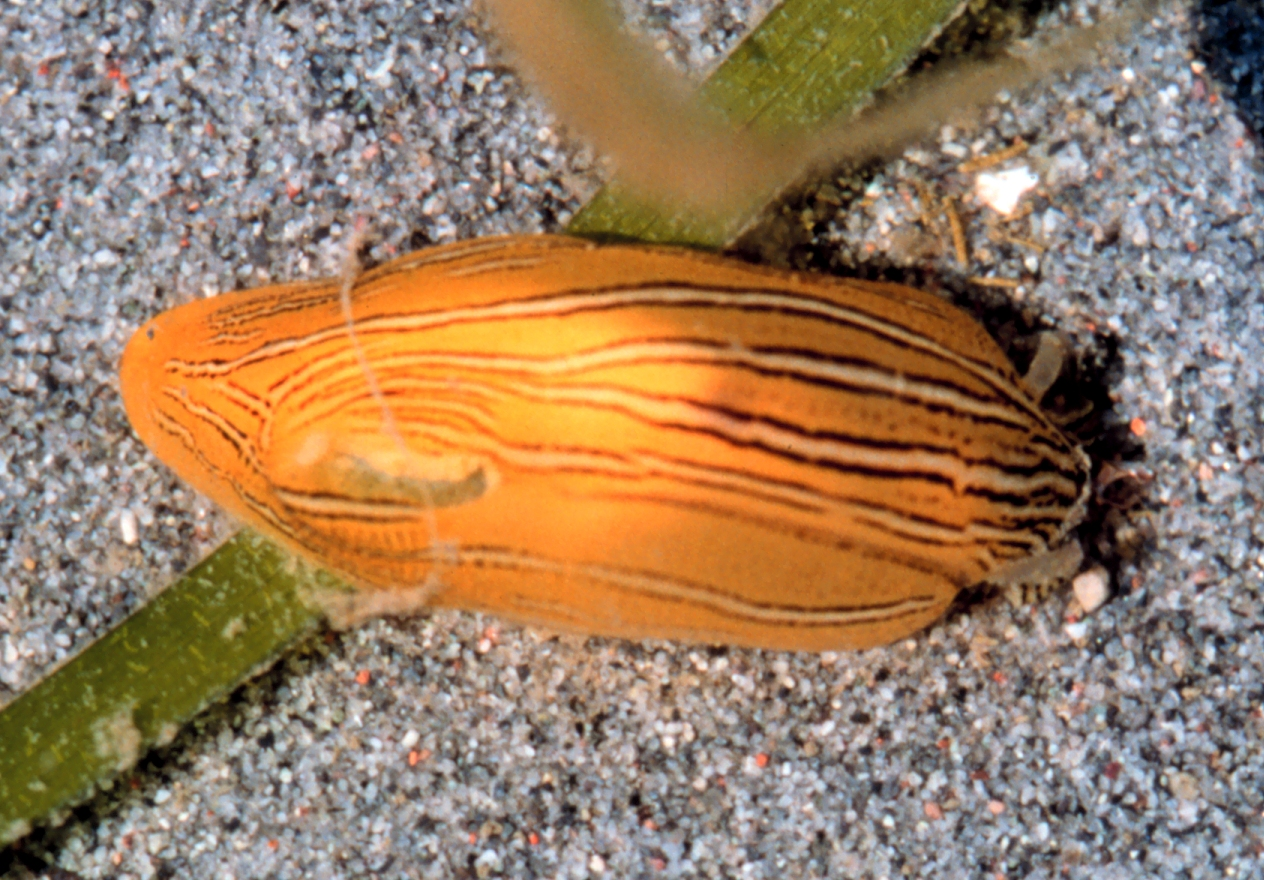
- A live individual of Phyllaplysia taylori, head end towards the right

Scientific classification
- Kingdom: Animalia
- Phylum: Mollusca
- Class: Gastropoda
- Order: Aplysiida
- Family: Aplysiidae
- Genus: Phyllaplysia; Fischer, 1872

Species
- See text

= Phyllaplysia =

Genus of gastropods

Phyllaplysia is a genus of sea slugs, specifically sea hares, marine gastropod mollusks in the family Aplysiidae, the sea hares.

Some authors place this genus in a separate family, Dolabriferidae.

== Species ==
Species within the genus Phyllaplysia include:

- Phyllaplysia engeli Marcus, 1955
  - Distribution : tropical waters of the Atlantic Ocean.
  - Length : 5 mm
- Phyllaplysia padinae Williams & Gosliner, 1973
  - Distribution : in bays and estuaries of the Gulf of California.
  - Length : 45 mm
  - Color : greenish with white spots
- Phyllaplysia smaragda K.B. Clark, 1977 or Emerald Leaf Slug
  - Distribution : along Florida's Atlantic Coast
  - Description : feeds on algae growing on the seagrass Syringodium. Discovered in 1970 and not been seen since 1982. It is now reported extinct, even if it was never listed on the Endangered Species Act.
- Phyllaplysia taylori Dall, 1900 Taylor's sea hare or eelgrass sea hare
