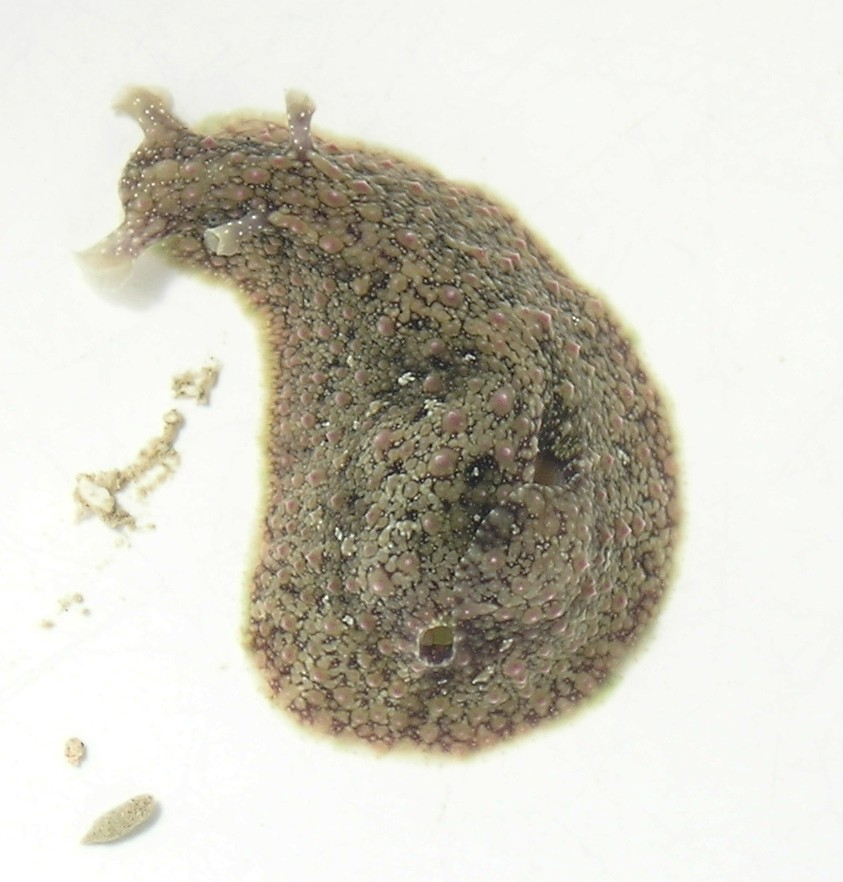
- A live individual of Dolabrifera dolabrifera, head end at the upper left

Conservation status
- Secure (NatureServe)

Scientific classification
- Kingdom: Animalia
- Phylum: Mollusca
- Class: Gastropoda
- Order: Aplysiida
- Family: Aplysiidae
- Genus: Dolabrifera
- Species: D. dolabrifera

Binomial name
- Dolabrifera dolabrifera (Rang, 1828)

Synonyms
- List: Aplysia ascifera Rang, 1828; Aplysia dolabrifera Cuvier, 1817 (nomen nudum); Aplysia oahouensis Souleyet, 1852; Dolabrifera ascifera (Rang, 1828); Dolabrifera cuvieri H. Adams & A. Adams, 1854 (unnecessary substitute name for Dolabrifera dolabrifera); Dolabrifera maillardi Deshayes, 1863; Dolabrifera nicaraguana Pilsbry, 1896; Dolabrifera olivacea Pease, 1860; Dolabrifera sowerbyi G.B. Sowerby II, 1868; Dolabrifera swiftii Pilsbry, 1896; Dolabrifera virens A. E. Verrill, 1901

= Dolabrifera dolabrifera =

Species of gastropod

Dolabrifera dolabrifera, commonly known as the warty seacat, is a species of sea hare, a marine gastropod mollusc in the family Aplysiidae, the sea hares. The animal goes by many names, including the common sea hare. The Hawaiian name for Dolabrifera dolabrifera, is Kualakai. This species is found in warm tropical and subtropical waters.

== Description & Biology ==
The warty seacat is a flat sea hare that grows to about 10 cm long. The maximum recorded length is 108 mm. It is commonly spotty green or brown, but it can also be reddish. The animal's back half is typically wider and rounded, it narrows towards the head. Warty seacats are soft-bodied gastropods, who have lost a protective shell over time. All species of sea hares have ink glands for chemical defense, though Dolabrifera dolabrifera does not release ink.

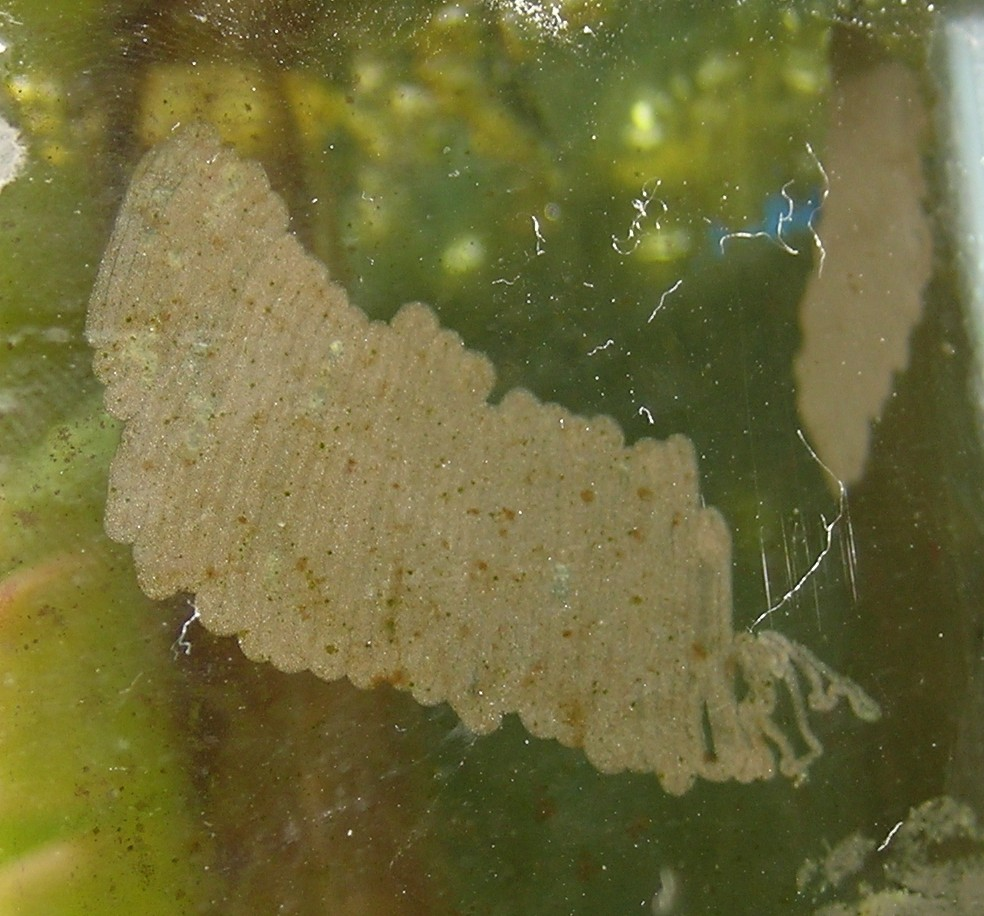
Dolabrifera dolabrifera 5 days old egg mass

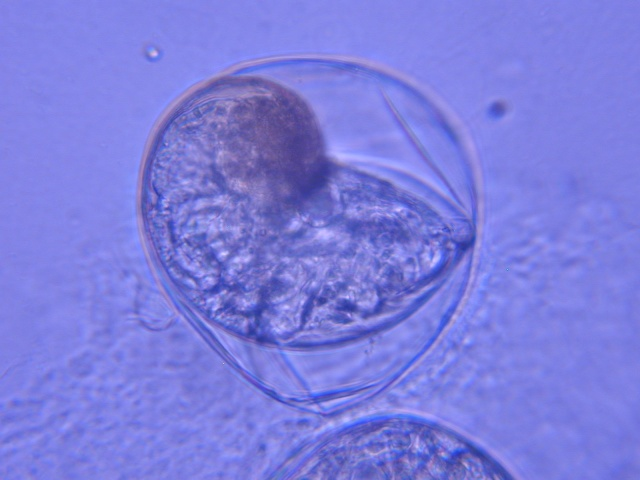
Dolabrifera dolabrifera veliger stage embryo, 7 days old, in egg capsule just before hatching

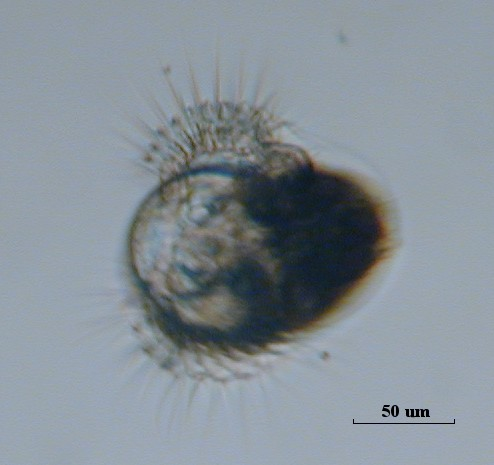
Veliger larva one day after hatching

== Habitat ==
These animals are majorly preyed on in their habitat. Warty seacats live in shallow-flat pools that contain large boulders, near-shore. Collections of the hares gather underneath rocks in the intertidal zone. At night the warty seacats hide themselves in between cracks found in the boulders. During the day, when the tide rises, the warty seacats emerge. Due to the varying in color and pattern, it is hard to distinguish them from other species in the habitat. The minimum recorded depth for this species is 0 m; the maximum recorded depth is 3 m.
