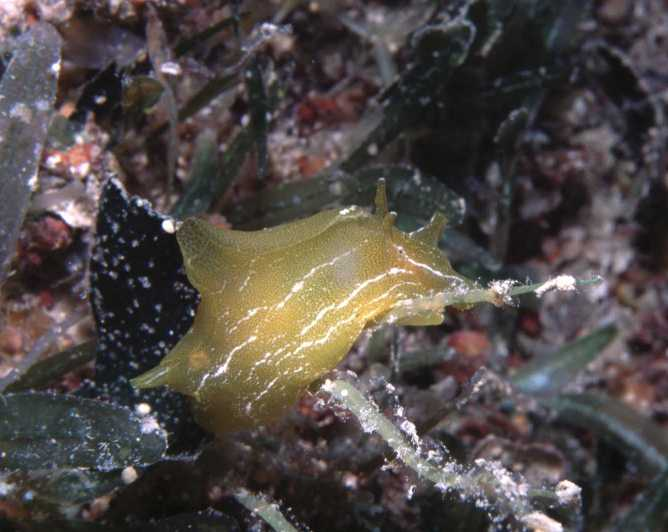

Scientific classification
- Kingdom: Animalia
- Phylum: Mollusca
- Class: Gastropoda
- Order: Aplysiida
- Family: Aplysiidae
- Genus: Syphonota; H. Adams & A. Adams, 1854
- Species: S. geographica

Binomial name
- Syphonota geographica (A. Adams & Reeve, 1850)

Synonyms
- Aplysia geographica (Adams & Reeve, 1850); Siphonotus geographicus A. Adams & Reeve, 1850 (basionym)

= Syphonota geographica =

Geographic sea hare

Species of gastropod

Syphonota geographica, or the geographic sea hare, is a species of sea slug or sea hare, a marine opisthobranch gastropod mollusk in the family Aplysiidae, the sea hares.

This is the only species within this genus, in other words, Syphonota is a monotypic genus.

== Distribution ==
This species is found in the Indo-West Pacific oceans, off Western Australia, and the Mediterranean, and Red seas.

== Description ==
Syphonota differs from the other Aplysiidae genera, through the position of the rhinophores (head tentacles), which are further back, almost between the parapodial lobes. The parapodia, fleshy winglike outgrowths, come to a noticeable high point at the top of the animal.

The body coloration is whitish to green, with brown specks and a complicated network of white lines (hence the name 'geographica').

The maximum recorded length is 170 mm.

== Habitat ==
This sea hare lives in lagoons and bays on sandy substrates.

Minimum recorded depth is 6 m. Maximum recorded depth is 7.5 m.
