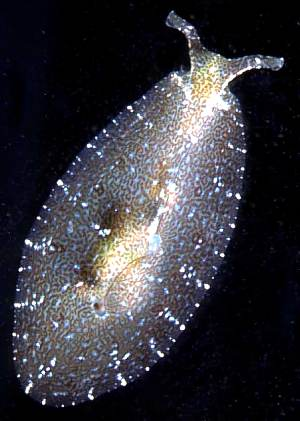
- Petalifera petalifera

Scientific classification
- Kingdom: Animalia
- Phylum: Mollusca
- Class: Gastropoda
- Order: Aplysiida
- Family: Aplysiidae
- Genus: Petalifera; Gray, 1847

Species
- See text

= Petalifera =

Genus of molluscs

Petalifera is a genus of sea slugs or sea hares, marine gastropod mollusks belonging to the family Aplysiidae, the sea hares.

Some authors place this genus in a separate family Dolabriferidae. A new study, published in September 2004, has shown that the genus Petalifera is paraphyletic.

(Note: Gastropod taxonomy has been in flux for more than half a century, and this is especially true currently, because of new research in molecular phylogeny. Because of all the ongoing changes, different reliable sources can yield very different classifications.)

A more general description can be found on the page of the superfamily Aplysioidea.

== Description ==
The parapodia (fleshy winglike outgrowths), as can be seen in photos of Petalifera petalifera, are almost completely fused. The pair of small rounded flaps form the parapodial cavity over the mantle cavity and the vestigial shell. These sea hares swim by coiling and uncoiling the body.

== Species ==
- Petalifera albomaculata Farran, 1905 - Sri Lanka.
- Petalifera habei Eales, 1960 (synonym of Petalifera ramosa)
- Petalifera krusadalai O’Donoghue, 1930
- Petalifera petalifera Rang, 1828
  - Distribution : Cosmopolitan.
  - Length : 2 to 4 cm
  - Color : grayish to brown, with white longitudinal bands; almost translucent.
  - Description : rather flat body; their color camouflages them when they are grazing on the brown alga Padina.
- Petalifera punctulata Tapparone-Canefri, 1874
  - Distribution : Japan
- Petalifera qingdaonensis Lin, 1990
- Petalifera ramosa Baba, 1959
  - Distribution : Western Pacific, Atlantic.
  - Length : 5 to 7 cm
  - Color : pink to pale brownish, with white rings over the body; almost translucent.
  - Description : mantle covered with firm conical tubercles; the larger tubercles have terminal papillae with retractable filamentous branches; difficult to find, mostly hidden under the leaves of green alga Caulerpa.

== External links and references ==
- Martinez, E. (1996). "On Petalifera petalifera (Rang, 1928) (Gastropoda: Opisthobranchia): new anatomical and geographical data". J. Molluscan Stud. 62 (2): 243–250. doi:10.1093/mollus/62.2.243.
- Baba, K. (1959). "The Genus Petalifera and a new species, P. ramosa, from Japan". Publ. Seto Mar. Biol. Lab. VII (3): 41–43.
- Photo of Petalifera petalifera
- Photo of Petalifera ramosa
