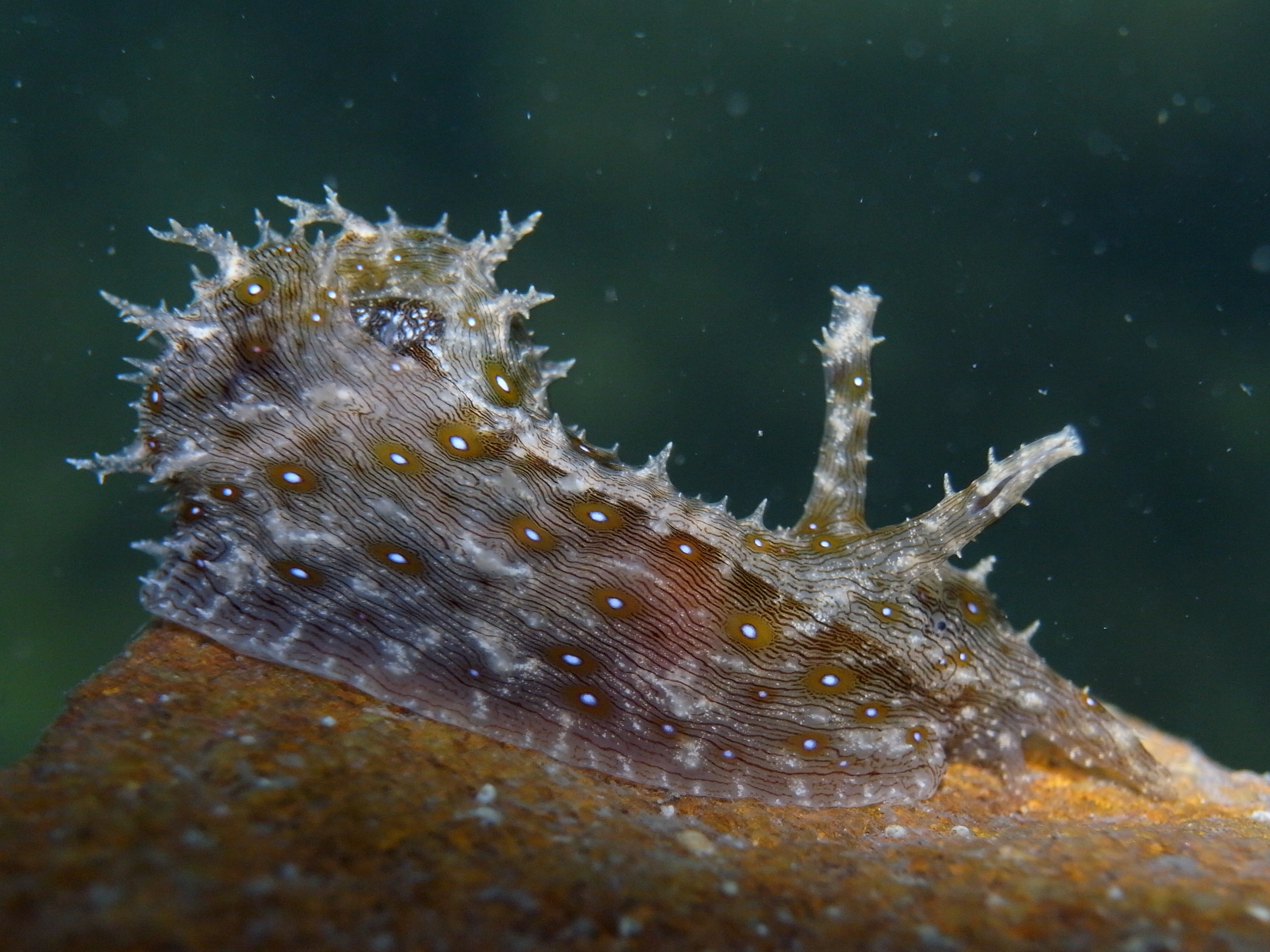
- Stylocheilus striatus

Scientific classification
- Kingdom: Animalia
- Phylum: Mollusca
- Class: Gastropoda
- Order: Aplysiida
- Family: Aplysiidae
- Genus: Stylocheilus; Gould, 1852

Type species
- Aplysia longicauda Quoy & Gaimard, 1825

= Stylocheilus =

Genus of gastropods

Stylocheilus is a genus of sea slugs, specifically sea hares, marine opisthobranch gastropod mollusks in the family Aplysiidae, the sea hares.

According to some authors this genus belongs in the family Dolabriferidae.

== Species ==
Species in the genus Stylocheilus include:

- Stylocheilus polyomma (Mörch, 1863)
- Stylocheilus rickettsi (MacFarland, 1966)
- Stylocheilus striatus Quoy & Gaimard, 1832
  - Distribution : Indo-Pacific; intertidal, occurs up to 30 m depth
  - Length : 65 mm
  - Color : brownish, with blue spots; lined species, with dark longitudinal lines (as stated by its name striatus) and small eyespots, providing excellent camouflage.
  - Description : Feeds on blue-green algae; gives off a purple ink when disturbed.

Taxon inquirendum

- Stylocheilus longicauda Quoy & Gaimard, 1824 - Blue-ring Sea Hare, Lemon Sea Hare (used to be called Stylocheilus citrina)
  - Distribution : circumtropical, Indo-West Pacific.
  - Color : bright yellow or green with bluish eyespots, no lines.
  - Description : This is one of the most specialized sea hares; elongate body with a long "tail" (as stated by its name longicauda), adapted for living on floating seaweed; feeds on Mermaid's Hair, blue-green algae of species Lynghya majuscula; at times, they are abundant, with several thousands crawling in the sand, traveling in chains ("snail trail") up to 10 m long

Species brought into synonymy

- Stylocheilus citrinus (Rang, 1828) is a synonym of Stylocheilus longicauda (Quoy & Gaimard, 1825)
- Stylocheilus lineolatus Gould, 1852: synonym of Stylocheilus longicauda (Quoy & Gaimard, 1825)
- Stylocheilus quercinus Gould, 1852
