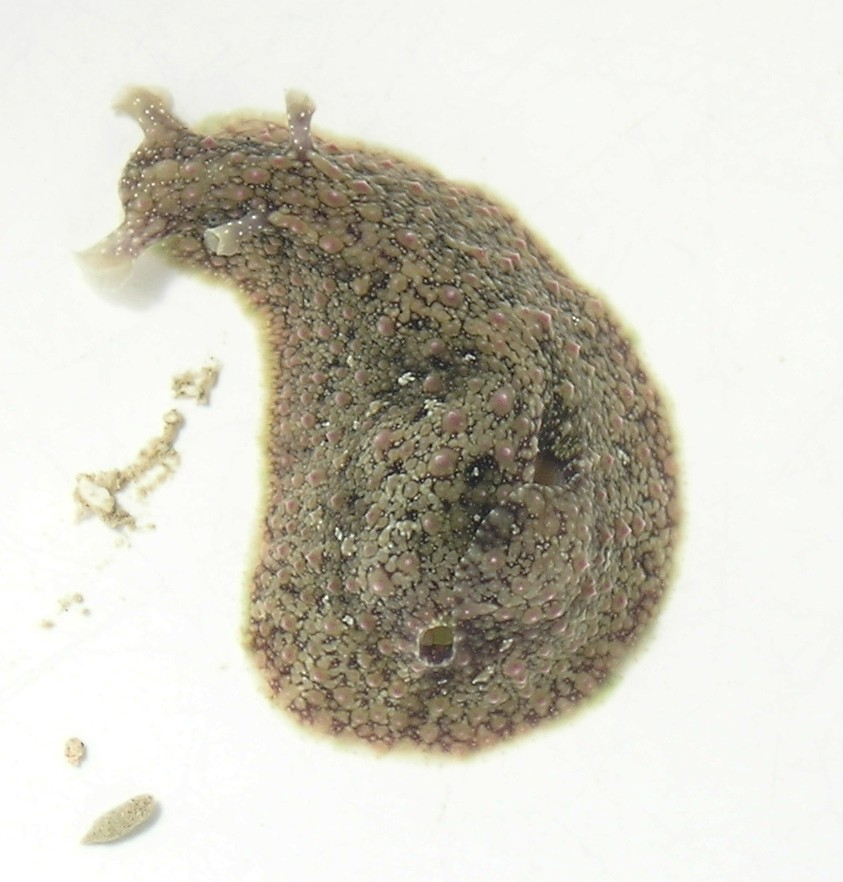
- A live individual of Dolabrifera dolabrifera, head end towards the upper left

Scientific classification
- Kingdom: Animalia
- Phylum: Mollusca
- Class: Gastropoda
- Order: Aplysiida
- Family: Aplysiidae
- Genus: Dolabrifera; Gray, 1847

Type species
- Aplysia dolabrifera Rang, 1828

= Dolabrifera =

Genus of gastropods

Dolabrifera is a genus of sea hares, a taxonomic group of sea slugs or marine opisthobranch gastropod mollusks belonging to the family Aplysiidae.

== Species ==
Species within the genus Dolabrifera include:

- Dolabrifera brazieri Sowerby, 1870
- Dolabrifera dolabrifera (Rang, 1828)
- Dolabrifera fusca Pease, 1868
- Dolabrifera holboelli Bergh, 1872: species inquirenda
- Dolabrifera jacksoniensis Pilsbry, 1896
- Dolabrifera vitraea G.B. Sowerby II, 1868

Species brought into synonymy

- Dolabrifera ascifera: synonym of Dolabrifera dolabrifera (Rang, 1828)
- Dolabrifera cuvieri H. Adams & A. Adams, 1854: synonym of Dolabrifera dolabrifera (Rang, 1828)
- Dolabrifera maillardi Deshayes, 1863: synonym of Dolabrifera dolabrifera (Rang, 1828)
- Dolabrifera nicaraguana Pilsbry, 1896: synonym of Dolabrifera dolabrifera (Rang, 1828)
- Dolabrifera olivacea Pease, 1860: synonym of Dolabrifera dolabrifera (Rang, 1828)
- Dolabrifera sowerbyi G.B. Sowerby II, 1868: synonym of Dolabrifera dolabrifera (Rang, 1828)
- Dolabrifera swiftii Pilsbry, 1896: synonym of Dolabrifera dolabrifera (Rang, 1828)
- Dolabrifera virens A. E. Verrill, 1901: synonym of Dolabrifera dolabrifera (Rang, 1828)
