= Aplysioidea =

Scientific classification
- Kingdom: Animalia
- Phylum: Mollusca
- Class: Gastropoda
- Infraclass: Euthyneura
- Subterclass: Tectipleura
- Order: Aplysiida
- Superfamily: Aplysioidea; Lamarck, 1809

Families
- See text

Superfamily of gastropods

Aplysioidea is a superfamily of predatory sea snails, marine gastropod mollusks within the order Aplysiida.

Aplysiidae is the only family in this superfamily.
