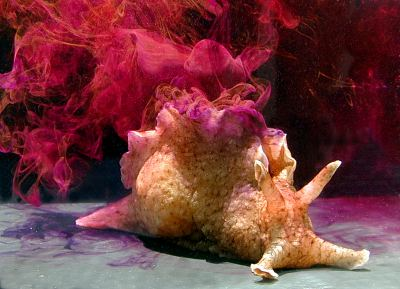
- Aplysia californica, a typical sea hare, shown here releasing a cloud of purple pigment, probably as a reaction to being disturbed.

Scientific classification
- Kingdom: Animalia
- Phylum: Mollusca
- Class: Gastropoda
- Order: Aplysiida
- Superfamily: Aplysioidea
- Family: Aplysiidae; Lamarck, 1809

Genera
- See text.

Synonyms
- Aplysiinae Lamarck, 1809 · accepted, alternate representation; Dolabriferidae (synonym); Dolabriferinae Pilsbry, 1895 · accepted, alternate representation; Notarchinae Mazzarelli, 1893 · accepted, alternate representation

= Aplysiidae =

Family of gastropods

Aplysiidae is the only family in the superfamily Aplysioidea, within the clade Anaspidea. These animals are commonly called sea hares because, unlike most sea slugs, they are often quite large, and when they are underwater, their rounded body shape and the long rhinophores on their heads mean that their overall shape resembles that of a sitting rabbit or hare. Sea hares are however sea snails with shells reduced to a small plate hidden between the parapodia, and some species are extremely large. The Californian black sea hare, Aplysia vaccaria is arguably the largest living gastropod species, and is certainly the largest living heterobranch gastropod.

== Description ==
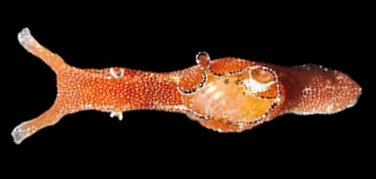
Dorsal view of a live Aplysia parvula showing general anatomy of sea hares.

Members of the Aplysiidae have an atrophied inner shell (in contrast with the nudibranchs, which have no shell at all). In Aplysia and Syphonota, this shell is a soft flattened plate over the visceral rear end, where it is fully or partially enclosed in the mantle skin. In Dolabella auricularia, the shell is ear-shaped. The shell is only present in the larval stage of the two genera Bursatella and Stylocheilus, and on this basis they have been grouped into the subfamily Dolabriferinae.

They are rather large animals. Their length can reach up to 75 cm (Aplysia vaccaria), and they can weigh well over 2 kg. They are cosmopolitan and found in temperate and tropical seas, inhabiting shallow coastal areas and sheltered bays, thick with vegetation.

The Aplysiidae are herbivorous, eating a variety of red, green or brown algae and eelgrass. Their color is diet-derived from the pigments of the algae. They concentrate the toxins found on algae.

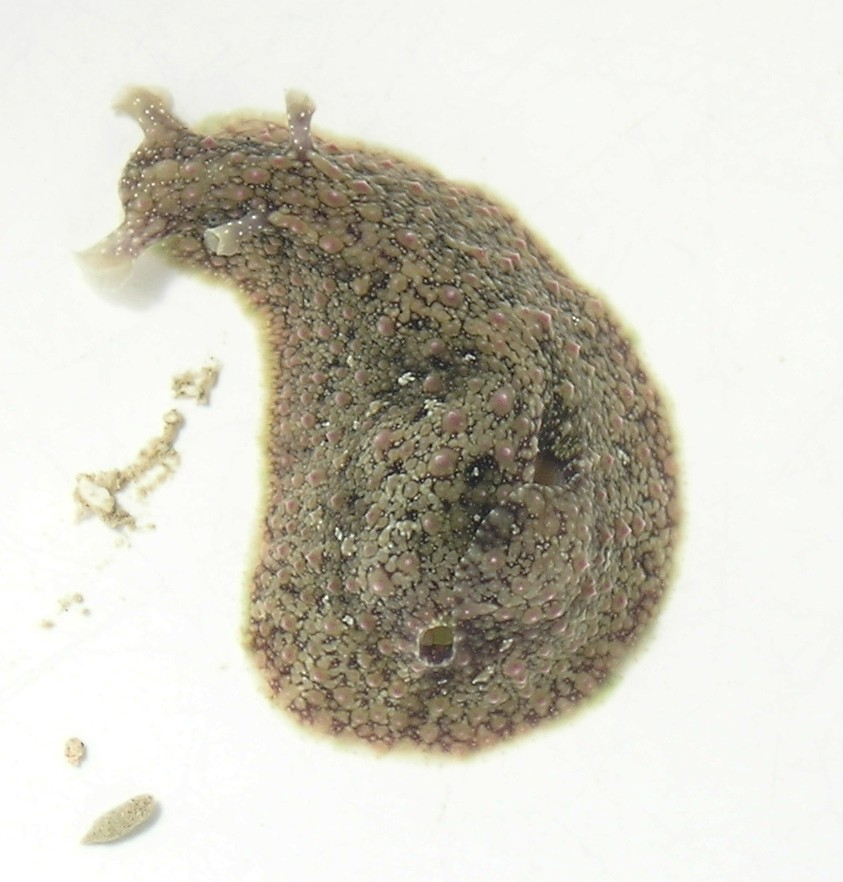
Sea hare Dolabrifera dolabrifera

== Defenses ==
Some species spout ink when disturbed or attacked, and they may also swim (rather than crawl) away, using their broad wing-like flaps or parapodia. The ink is extracted from their algal food, rather than being synthesized.

Sea hares have two main secretory glands in their mantle cavity.

- purple gland: lying on top of the mantle cavity, above the gill. It gives off a red or purple fluid, or, in some species, a white ink.
- opaline gland: situated on the floor of the mantle cavity, beneath the gill. It gives off a white opaque secretion.

The genus Aplysia has proved useful as a model in neurobiology for the study of electrical synapses, which mediate the release of the clouds of ink.

== Mating habits ==
Sea hares are hermaphrodites, with fully functional male and female reproductive organs. The penis is on the right side of the head while the vagina is situated in the mantle cavity, beneath the shell, deep down between the parapodia. It is therefore physically impossible for mating partners to act as both male and female at the same time.

They have unusual mating habits: they can mate in pairs with one acting as a male, the other as a female, but they commonly occur in quite crowded numbers during the mating season, and this often leads to chains of three or more sea hares mating together. The one at the front acts as a female and the one at the back as a male. The animal(s) in between are acting as both males and females, in other words, the animal receiving sperm passes its own sperm to a third sea hare.

== Predators ==
Predators include pycnogonid sea spiders, wrasses and sea turtles.

== Laboratory use ==
Following the lead of Ladislav Tauc and his pupil Eric R. Kandel, Aplysia has been studied as a model organism by neurobiologists, because its gill and siphon withdrawal reflex, as studied in Aplysia californica, is mediated by electrical synapses, which allow several neurons to fire synchronously. This quick neural response is necessary for a speedy reaction to danger by the animal. Aplysia has only about 20,000 neurons, making it a favorite subject for investigation by neuroscientists. Also, the 'tongue' on the underside is controlled by only two neurons, which allowed complete mapping of the innervation network to be carried out.

== Taxonomy ==
A 2004 study has shown that Aplysiidae is a monophyletic taxon with two distinct clades: Aplysiinae and Dolabellinae + Dolabriferinae + Notarchinae.

The authority of this family is still somewhat in dispute. The family was incorrectly originally spelled as Laplysiana. This was a Latinized form of the original common name "les Laplysiens" as described in Philosophie zoologique, 1:320 by Lamarck in 1809. Rafinesque introduced the new name Laplysinia in 1815. In 2001 Bouchet & Rocroi advocated the attribution of the name Aplysiidae to Lamarck.

=== Subfamilies ===
Classification after N. B. Eales (1984):

- Aplysiinae Lamarck, 1809
- Dolabellinae Pilsbry, 1895
- Dolabriferinae Pilsbry, 1895
- Notarchinae Mazzarelli, 1893

=== Genera ===
- Aplysia Linnaeus, 1767 - type genus
- Bursatella Blainville, 1817
- Dolabella Lamarck, 1801
- Dolabrifera Gray, 1847
- † Floribella Woodring, 1970
- Notarchus Cuvier, 1817
- Paraplysia Pilsbry, 1895
- Petalifera Gray, 1847
- Phycophila A. Adams, 1861
- Phyllaplysia Fischer, 1872
- Stylocheilus Gould, 1852
- Syphonota H. Adams & A. Adams, 1854 - the only one species: Syphonota geographica (A. Adams & Reeve, 1850)

Genera brought into synonymy

- Aclesia Rang, 1828: synonym of Bursatella Blainville, 1817
- Aplysiella P. Fischer, 1872: synonym of Petalifera Gray, 1847
- Barnardaclesia Eales & Engel, 1935: synonym of Bursatella Blainville, 1817
- Busiris Risso, 1826: synonym of Notarchus Cuvier, 1816
- Laplysia Linnaeus, 1767: synonym of Aplysia Linnaeus, 1767
- Neaplysia J. G. Cooper, 1863: synonym of Aplysia (Neaplysia) J. G. Cooper, 1863 represented as Aplysia Linnaeus, 1767
- Phycophila A. Adams, 1861: synonym of Aplysia (Phycophila) A. Adams, 1861 represented as Aplysia Linnaeus, 1767
- Pruvotaplysia Engel, 1936: synonym of Aplysia (Pruvotaplysia) Engel, 1936 represented as Aplysia Linnaeus, 1767
- Ramosaclesia Iredale, 1929: synonym of Bursatella Blainville, 1817
- Siphonotus A. Adams & Reeve, 1850: synonym of Syphonota H. Adams & A. Adams, 1854
- Tullia Pruvot-Fol, 1933: synonym of Aplysia (Tullia) Pruvot-Fol, 1933 represented as Aplysia Linnaeus, 1767
- Varria Eales, 1960: synonym of Aplysia (Varria) Eales, 1960 represented as Aplysia Linnaeus, 1767
