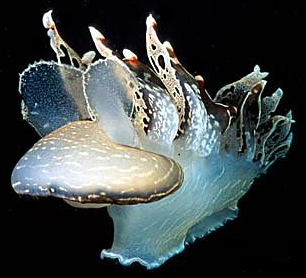
- Tethys fimbria

Scientific classification
- Kingdom: Animalia
- Phylum: Mollusca
- Class: Gastropoda
- Order: Nudibranchia
- Suborder: Cladobranchia
- Family: Tethydidae
- Genus: Tethys; Linnaeus, 1767

Type species
- Tethys fimbria Linnaeus, 1767

Synonyms
- Fimbria O'Donoghue, 1926 (invalid: junior homonym of Fimbria Megerle, 1811.)

= Tethys (gastropod) =

Genus of gastropods

Tethys is a genus of sea slugs, nudibranchs, marine gastropod mollusks in the family Tethydidae.

== Species ==
- Tethys dominguensis Pruvot-Fol, 1954
- Tethys fimbria Linnaeus, 1767
- Tethys occidentalis (Odhner, 1936)

Synonyms

- Tethys (Aplysia): synonym of Aplysia Linnaeus, 1767
- Tethys (Aplysia) morio Verrill, 1901: synonym of Aplysia morio (A. E. Verrill, 1901)
- Tethys capensis O'Donoghue, 1929: synonym of Aplysia juliana Quoy & Gaimard, 1832
- Tethys cornigera Macri, 1816: synonym of Tethys fimbria Linnaeus, 1767
- Tethys extraordinaria Allan, 1932: synonym of Aplysia extraordinaria (Allan, 1932) (original combination)
- Tethys fimbriata: synonym of Tethys fimbria Linnaeus, 1767 (misspelling)
- Tethys floridensis Pilsbry, 1895: synonym of Aplysia fasciata Poiret, 1789
- Tethys hirasei Baba, 1936: synonym of Aplysia oculifera A. Adams & Reeve, 1850
- Tethys leporina Linnaeus, 1758: synonym of Tethys fimbria Linnaeus, 1767 (ICZN opinion 200: suppressed under the plenary powers for the purposes of the principle of Priority only)
- Tethys panamensis Pilsbry, 1895: synonym of Aplysia dactylomela Rang, 1828
- Tethys parthenopeia Macri, 1816: synonym of Tethys fimbria Linnaeus, 1767
- Tethys peasei Tryon, 1895: synonym of Aplysia peasei (Tryon, 1895)
- Tethys pilsbryi Letson, 1898 accepted as Aplysia pilsbryi (Letson, 1898)
- Tethys polyphylla Macri, 1816: synonym of Tethys fimbria Linnaeus, 1767
- Tethys pulmonica (Gould, 1852): synonym of Aplysia pulmonica Gould, 1852
- Tethys robertsi Pilsbry, 1895: synonym of Aplysia robertsi (Pilsbry, 1895)
- Tethys willcoxi (Heilprin, 1887): synonym of Aplysia fasciata Poiret, 1789
