= Mirifica =

Mirifica may refer to:

== Biology ==
- Capparis mirifica is a species of plant in the family Capparaceae.
- Melibe mirifica is a species of sea slug, a marine gastropod mollusk in the family Tethydidae.
- Lewinia mirifica is a species of bird in the family Rallidae.
- Pueraria mirifica is a plant found in northern and north eastern Thailand and Myanmar.

== Religion ==
- Inter Mirifica is the Second Vatican Council's Decree on the Media of Social Communications.
