= M. fimbriata =

M. fimbriata may refer to:

- Megachile fimbriata, a bee species
- Mitrella fimbriata, a sea snail species

== Synonyms ==
- Melibe fimbriata, a synonym of Melibe viridis, a sea slug species
