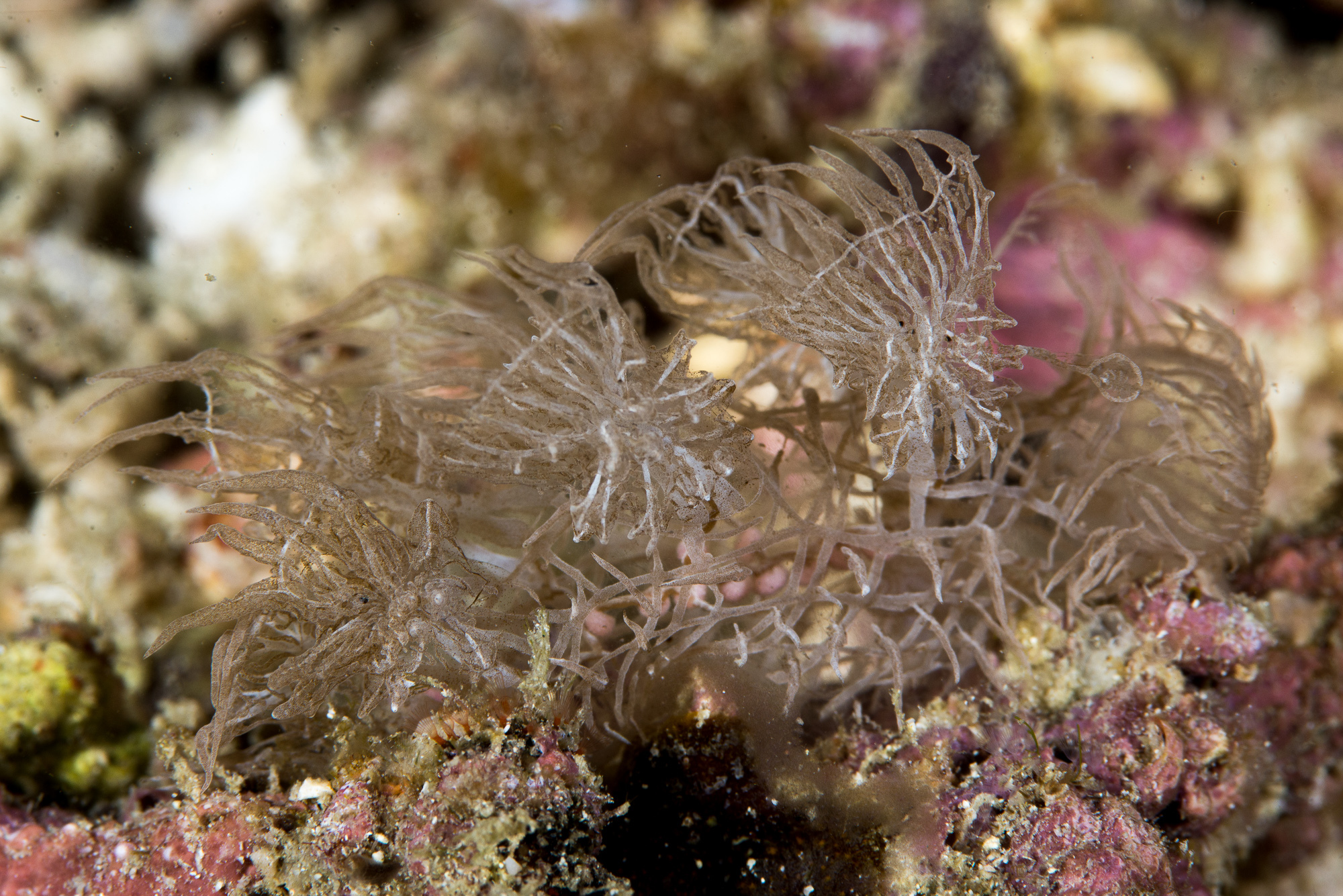

Scientific classification
- Kingdom: Animalia
- Phylum: Mollusca
- Class: Gastropoda
- Order: Nudibranchia
- Suborder: Dendronotacea
- Family: Tethydidae
- Genus: Melibe
- Species: M. colemani

Binomial name
- Melibe colemani Gosliner & Pola, 2012

= Melibe colemani =

Coleman's melibe

Species of sea slug

Melibe colemani, also known as the Coleman's melibe, ghost nudi, or ghost melibe, is a species of nudibranch in the family Tethydidae. Discovered by Neville Coleman in 2008 off the coast of the island of Mabul in Malaysia, it was formally described by Marta Pola and Terrence Gosliner in 2012 and named in honour of its discoverer. It is found throughout the Coral Triangle region of Malaysia, Indonesia, and the Philippines.

Due to its translucent body and network of brown tubules across its body, its appearance has been described as a "pile of strings" or a "string of snot in the water". This appearance is likely to serve as camouflage, resembling oceanic debris. Its strange appearance has led some to dub it "the holy grail of nudibranchs".

== Taxonomy ==
Melibe colemani was first discovered in 2008 by Neville Coleman, who published a photograph of M. colemani in his book Nudibranchs Encyclopedia. The type locality was by the island of Mabul, Malaysia. Specifically "between the old training jetty and the new training jetty" as per the original description of the nudibranch. The specific epithet commemorates Coleman, as the original discoverer who had died a month before the publication of Marta Pola and Terrence Gosliner's original description in 2012. It is commonly known as Coleman's Melibe, the ghost melibe, or the ghost nudi. The vernacular name of "Coleman's Melibe" was given to it by Coleman himself as a tentative name, stating "it does not necessarily mean that when it is finally described that it will remain as that".

Phylogenetic analysis puts Melibe colemani in the same clade within the genus Melibe as Melibe engeli, Melibe digitata, and Melibe tuberculata as a sister taxon. The following is the cladistic diagram published by Gosliner and Pola:

- rest of Melibe
  - - Melibe colemani
  - - - Melibe digitata
      - Melibe tuberculata
    - Melibe engeli

== Description ==
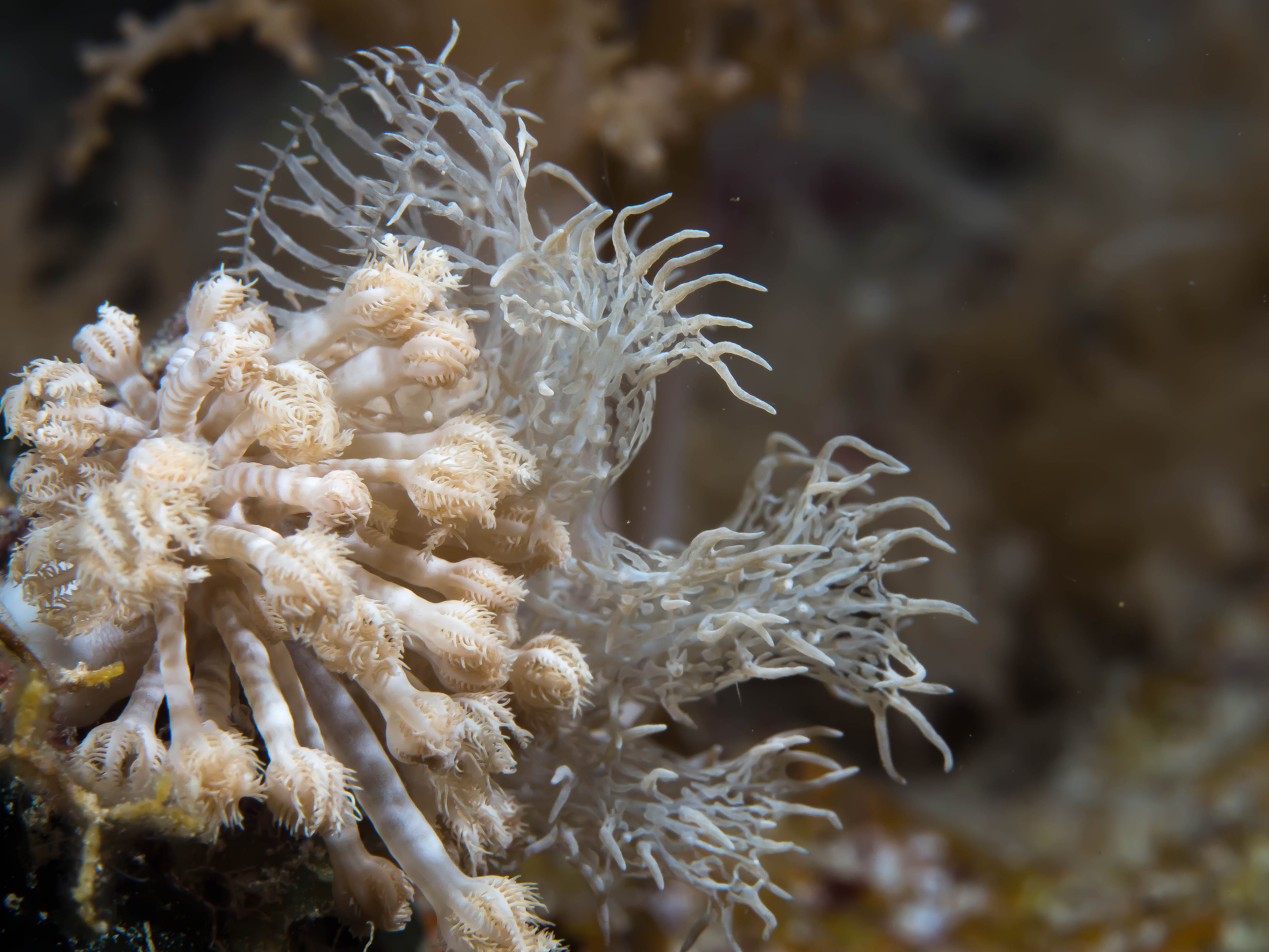
The physical appearance of Melibe colemani has been compared to that of a "string of snot in the water" due to its network of tubules and translucent body.

Melibe colemani externally resembles the related Melibe bucephala and Melibe engeli. Its cerata bear elongate apical papillae akin to the other nudibranchs, with laterally flattened cerata, as opposed to the cylindrical cerata of M. bucephala and M. engeli. The rhinoporal sheath of M. colemani is cylindrical, with a single papilla on its apex. As opposed to the sail shaped rhinoporal sheaths with numerous papillae on the related species.

The body of Melibe colemani is translucent, with its internal organs visible to the naked eye. The digestive glands of the sea slug are visible as a network of whitish brown tubules. The network of digestive glands has been compared to a "pile of strings", or a "string of snot in the water". The tubes act as camouflage, as the sea slug blends in with its surroundings to resemble a piece of debris on the sea floor, or to resemble sponges, algae, or hydroids on the sea floor. The tube network extends onto the sea slug's back into organs known as cerata. At initial glance, the front and the back of the sea slug are indistinguishable, with the anterior end noticeable through the net-shaped mouth. The body length is approximately 60 millimetres (2.4 in). The net-like oral hood of the nudibranch serves as its mouth, and it swallows prey whole, like other members of the family Tethydidae. The nudibranch is thought to feed on corals of the genus Xenia, and has been spotted interacting with flatworms of the genus Waminoa. Dissection of its stomach contents revealed a diet of shelled caenogastropods. Due to its strange appearance, the nudibranch has been dubbed the "holy grail of nudibranchs" by underwater photographers.

== Distribution ==
Melibe colemani is native to the saltwater seas of Southeast Asia, throughout the Coral Triangle region. First sighted on the island of Mabul in Malaysia, additional sightings were noted by the islands of Komodo and Lembeh in Indonesia, as well as Romblon in the Philippines. Romblon in particular has been noted as a site where the nudibranch is particularly abundant.

=== Habitat ===
Melibe colemani is found in warm marine waters, with one sighting in waters of 28 °C (82 °F) in temperature and 10 metres (33 ft) in depth, and is often found near coral rubble of the genus Xenia, which serves as a possible food source for the sea slug. The observations of M. colemani in Mabul, Malaysia, are in association with the coral species Briareum.
