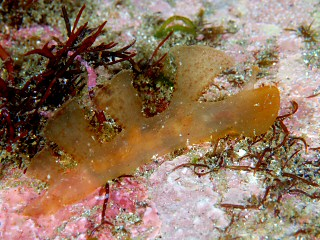

Scientific classification
- Domain: Eukaryota
- Kingdom: Animalia
- Phylum: Mollusca
- Class: Gastropoda
- Order: Nudibranchia
- Suborder: Cladobranchia
- Family: Tethydidae
- Genus: Melibe
- Species: M. papillosa

Binomial name
- Melibe papillosa (de Filippi, 1867)

Synonyms
- Jacunia papillosa de Filippi, 1867

= Melibe papillosa =

Species of gastropod

Melibe papillosa is a species of sea slug, a nudibranch, a marine gastropod mollusk in the family Tethydidae. This species is yellowish and somewhat translucent. The oral hood, which is large, has flattened hatchet-shaped cerata. It is found in the waters around Japan.
