= Nonlabens ulvanivorans =

Scientific classification
- Domain: Bacteria
- Kingdom: Pseudomonadati
- Phylum: Bacteroidota
- Class: Flavobacteriia
- Order: Flavobacteriales
- Family: Flavobacteriaceae
- Genus: Nonlabens
- Species: N. ulvanivorans

Binomial name
- Nonlabens ulvanivorans (Barbeyron et al. 2011) Yi and Chun 2012

Type strain
- PLR

Synonyms
- Persicivirga ulvanivorans

Bacterium

Nonlabens ulvanivorans is a Gram-negative, strictly aerobic, rod-shaped, chemoorganotrophic and non-motile bacterium from the genus of Nonlabens which has been isolated from the faeces of the sea slug Aplysia punctata.
