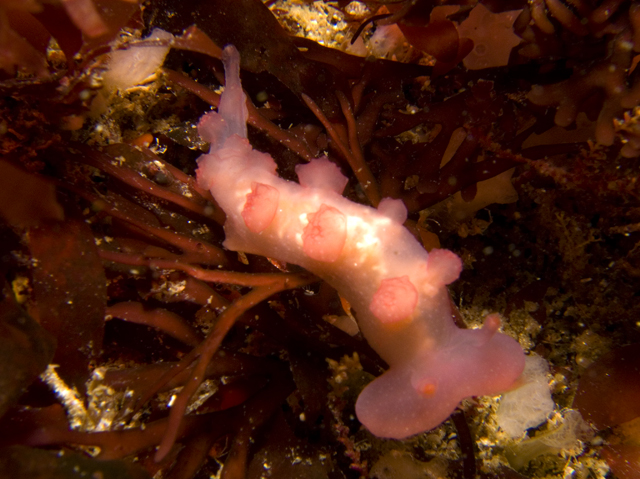

Scientific classification
- Kingdom: Animalia
- Phylum: Mollusca
- Class: Gastropoda
- Order: Nudibranchia
- Suborder: Dendronotacea
- Family: Tethydidae
- Genus: Melibe
- Species: M. rosea

Binomial name
- Melibe rosea Rang, 1829

= Melibe rosea =

Species of gastropod

Melibe rosea, the cowled nudibranch, is a species of sea slug, a dendronotid nudibranch, a marine gastropod mollusc in the family Tethydidae.

This species is only found in South Africa.

== Distribution ==
This species is endemic to the South African coast and is found from Port Nolloth to Port Alfred, usually intertidally, but occasionally to 10 m.

== Description ==
The cowled nudibranch is a white to pinky-red nudibranch distinguished by its large extendable hood. Knobbly paired cerata extend down the margins of the smooth notum. The notum and cerata may have opaque white encrustations. It can grow as large as 50 mm in total length.

== Ecology ==
The cowled nudibranch feeds on small crustaceans, capturing them with its oral hood.
