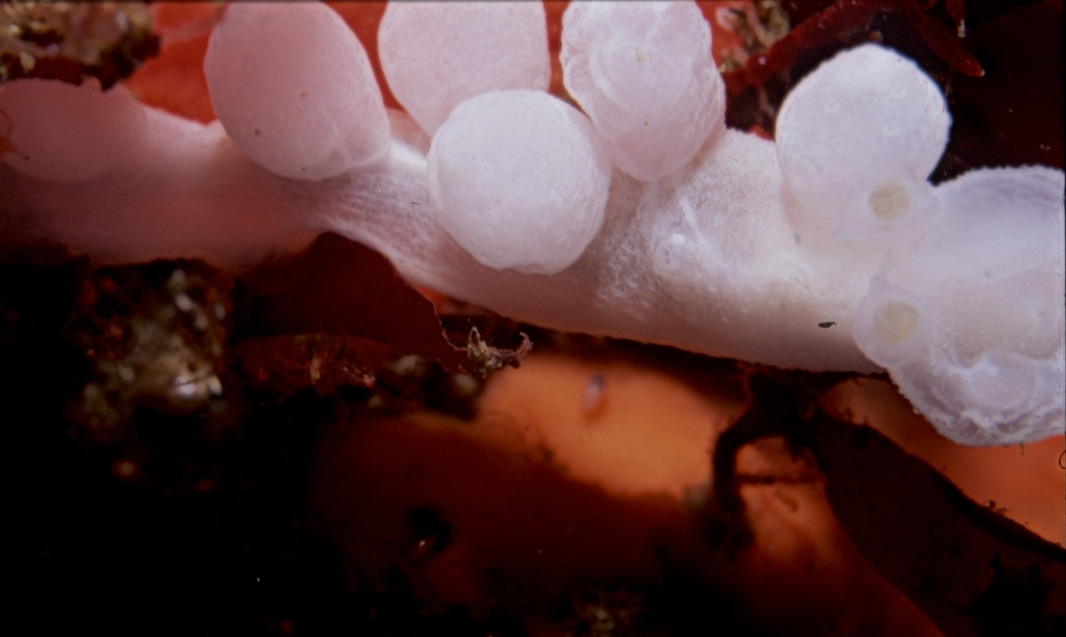

Scientific classification
- Kingdom: Animalia
- Phylum: Mollusca
- Class: Gastropoda
- Order: Nudibranchia
- Suborder: Dendronotacea
- Family: Tethydidae
- Genus: Melibe
- Species: M. liltvedi

Binomial name
- Melibe liltvedi Gosliner, 1987

= Dinosaur nudibranch =

Species of gastropod

The dinosaur nudibranch (Melibe liltvedi) is a species of dendronotid nudibranch, and is only found in South Africa. It is a marine gastropod mollusc in the family Tethydidae.

== Distribution ==
This species is endemic to the South African coast and has only been found on the Atlantic coast of the Cape Peninsula in 10 to 20 m.

== Description ==
The dinosaur nudibranch is a white nudibranch distinguished by its large extendable hood. Puffy paired cerata extend down the notum and there is a projection of unknown function behind the rhinophore sheath.

== Ecology ==
The dinosaur nudibranch feeds on small crustaceans, capturing them with its oral hood.
