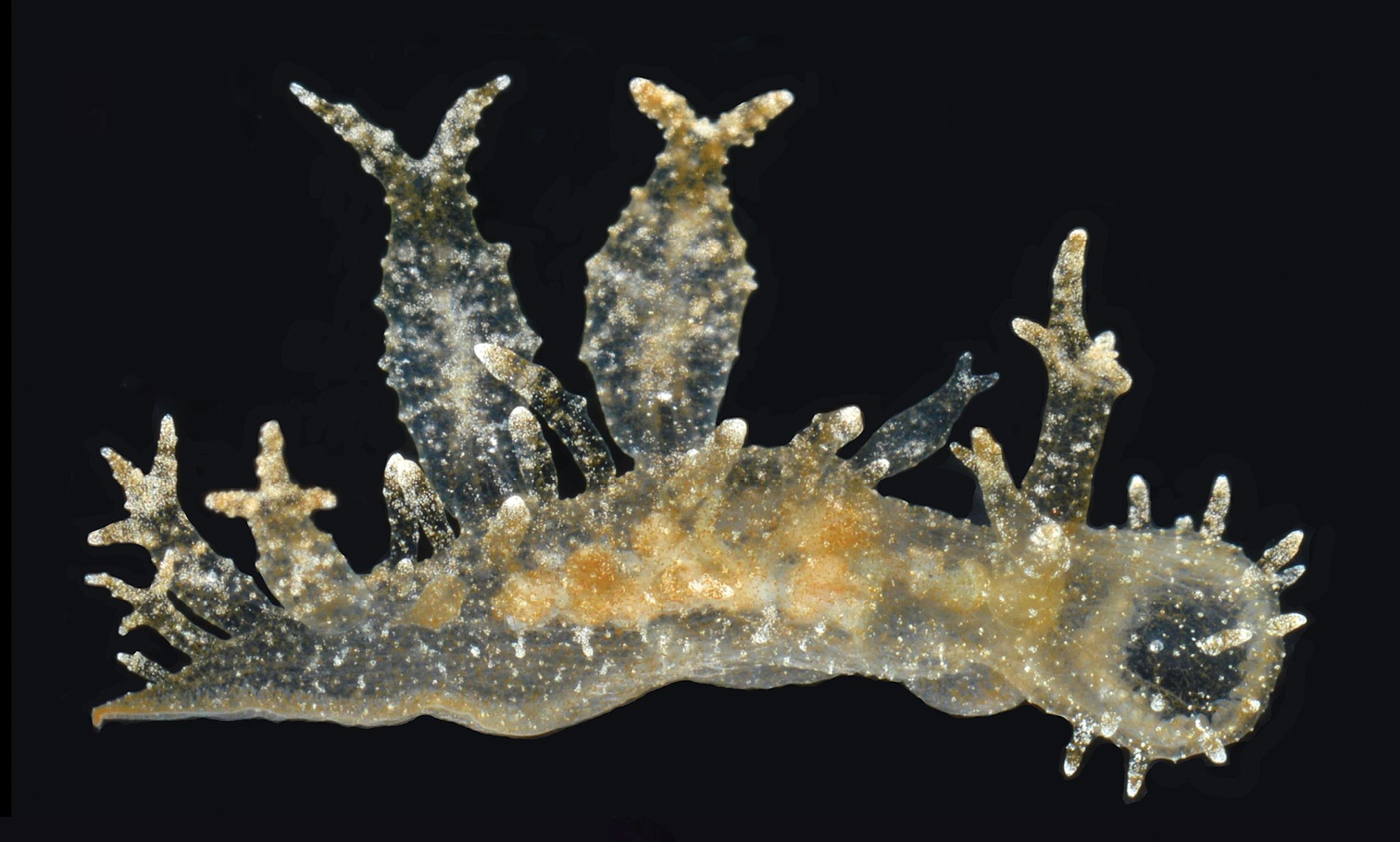

Scientific classification
- Kingdom: Animalia
- Phylum: Mollusca
- Class: Gastropoda
- Order: Nudibranchia
- Suborder: Dendronotacea
- Family: Tethydidae
- Genus: Melibe
- Species: M. arianeae

Binomial name
- Melibe arianeae Espinoza, DuPont & Valdés, 2013

= Melibe arianeae =

Species of sea slug

Melibe arianeae is a species of sea slug, a nudibranch, a marine gastropod mollusc in the family Tethydidae.

== Description ==
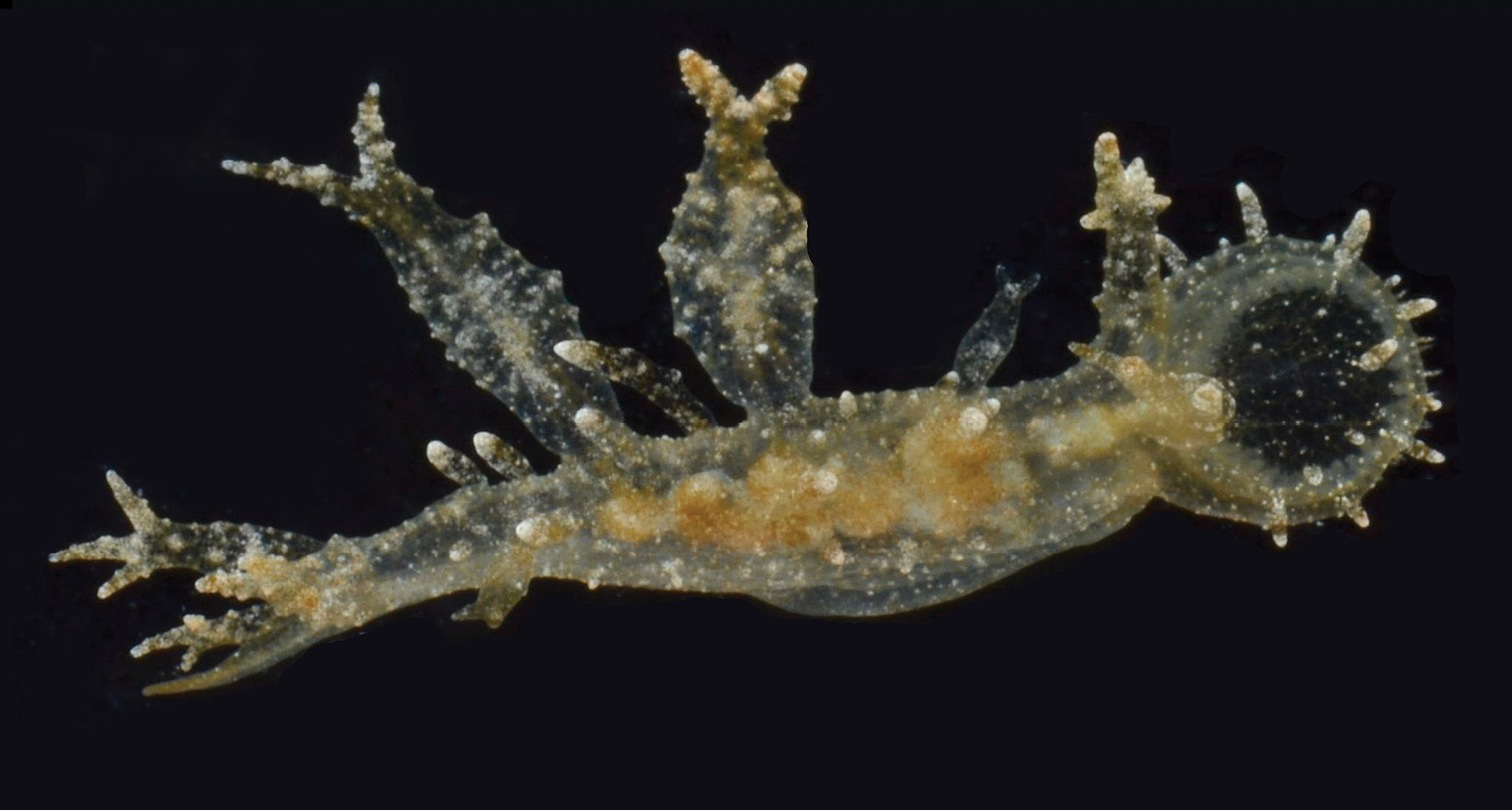

The overall shape of Melibe arianeae is elongate and limaciform. Anterolaterally, it is compressed to a small degree. It tapers posteriorly to form a long and conical shape to the end of the foot.

The surface of the body of this species is almost transparent. It and the cerata and rhinophoral sheaths are completely covered with multiple, tiny tubercles that are white and opaque. The surface has blotches that are white and opaque as well as multiple orange flecks. The internal organs appear orange-brownish.

The cerata are mainly warty in appearance due to complete coverage of small tubercules. They are oval and are inflated with their distal ends being bifurcate or trifurcate, or, simple. Within the cerata, the branches of the digestive gland are visible due to the cerata being transparent. This gland appears as an axis brownish in colour.

== Distribution ==
This species is found in the tropical western Atlantic, the type material, so far the only material known, was found in Florida.
