= Nonlabens xiamenensis =

Scientific classification
- Domain: Bacteria
- Kingdom: Pseudomonadati
- Phylum: Bacteroidota
- Class: Flavobacteriia
- Order: Flavobacteriales
- Family: Flavobacteriaceae
- Genus: Nonlabens
- Species: N. xiamenensis

Binomial name
- Nonlabens xiamenensis Huang et al. 2020

Type strain
- 1Q3

Bacterium

Nonlabens xiamenensis is a Gram-negative, rod-shaped and non-motile bacterium from the genus of Nonlabens which has been isolated from seawater from the coast of Xiamen Island.
