= Parapercis colemani =

Scientific classification
- Kingdom: Animalia
- Phylum: Chordata
- Class: Actinopterygii
- Order: Labriformes
- Family: Pinguipedidae
- Genus: Parapercis
- Species: P. colemani

Binomial name
- Parapercis colemani J. E. Randall & Francis, 1993

Species of ray-finned fish

Parapercis colemani is a ray-finned fish species in the sandperch family, Pinguipedidae. It is found at Norfolk Island.. This species reaches a length of 8.2 cm (3.2 in).

== Etymology ==
The fish is named in honor of Neville Coleman (1938-2012), an environmental photographer, an explorer and a conservationist, who discovered and photographed this species in 1989.
