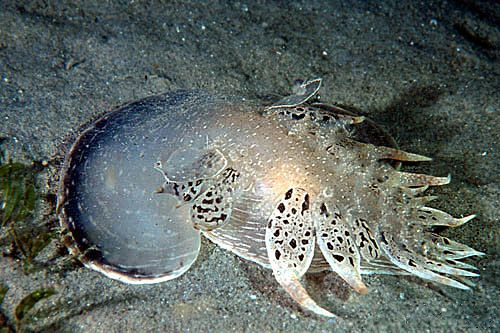
- Tethys fimbria on the sand bottom shows its broad oral hood on the left (the head end) and the body with two rows of spotted cerata

Scientific classification
- Kingdom: Animalia
- Phylum: Mollusca
- Class: Gastropoda
- Order: Nudibranchia
- Suborder: Dendronotacea
- Family: Tethydidae
- Genus: Tethys; Linnaeus, 1767
- Species: T. fimbria

Binomial name
- Tethys fimbria Linnaeus, 1767

Synonyms
- Tethys leporina Linnaeus, 1758; Tethys cornigera Macri, 1816; Tethys parthenopeia Macri, 1816; Tethys polyphylla Macri, 1816

= Tethys fimbria =

Species of gastropod

Tethys fimbria is a species of predatory sea slug, a nudibranch, a marine gastropod mollusk in the family Tethydidae.

ICZN opinion 200 ruled that Tethys fimbria is a valid name and Tethys leporina Linnaeus, 1758 is a synonym.

== Distribution ==
The distribution of Tethys fimbria includes the Mediterranean Sea and the east coast of the Atlantic Ocean from Portugal in the north, to the Gulf of Guinea in the south.

== Description ==
The length of the body of Tethys fimbria can reach up to 30 cm (12 in). Tethys fimbria is translucent, but it has dark spots on its cerata. It has a broad oral hood in the frontal part of its body. Rhinophores are small. Tethys fimbria has no radula as is the case in all members of the family Tethydidae.

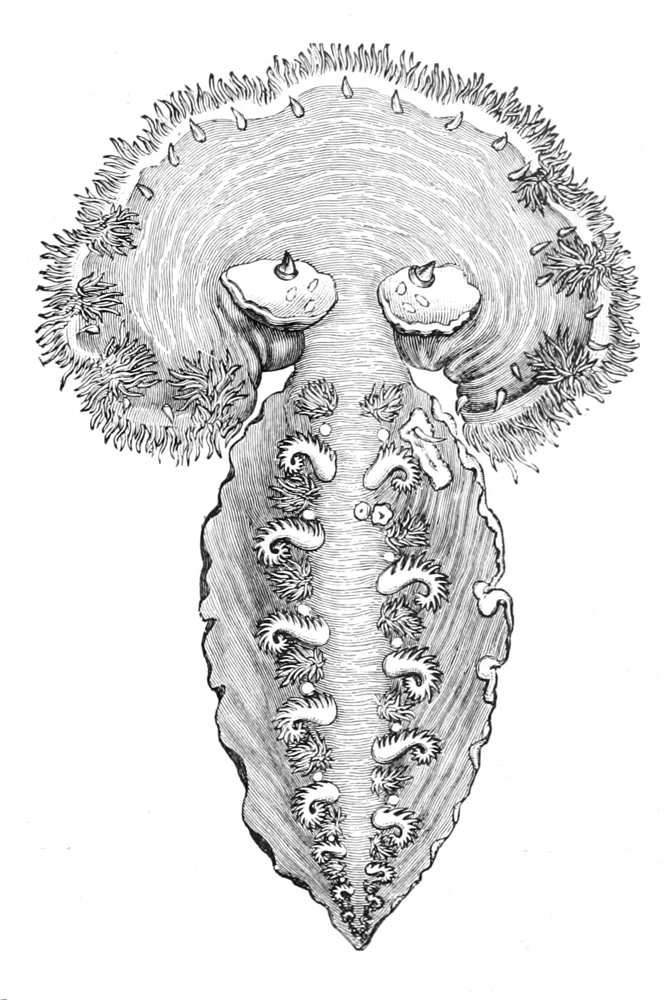
Drawing of dorsal view of Tethys fimbria, oral hood at the top of the image

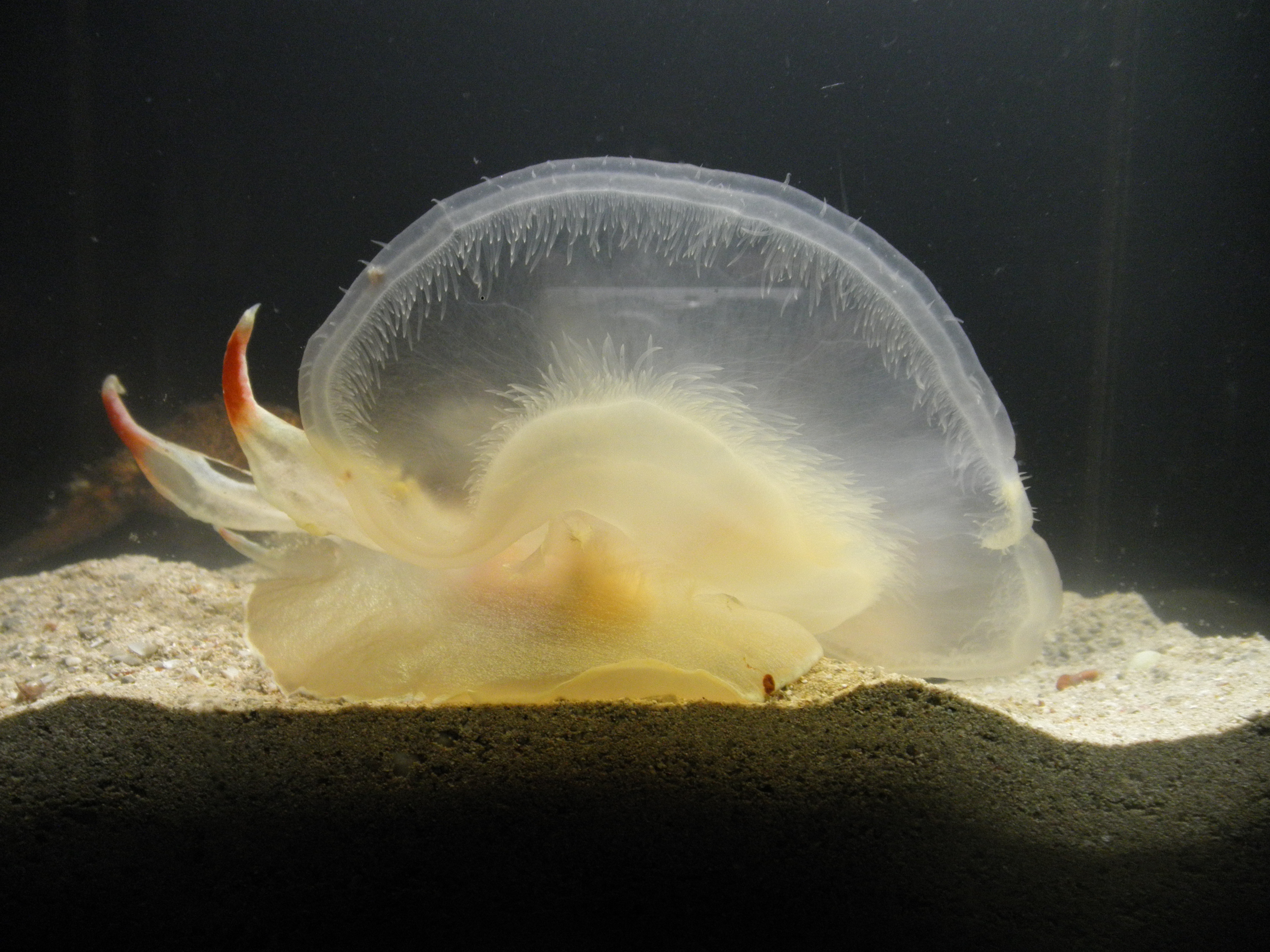
Underside view of oral velum.

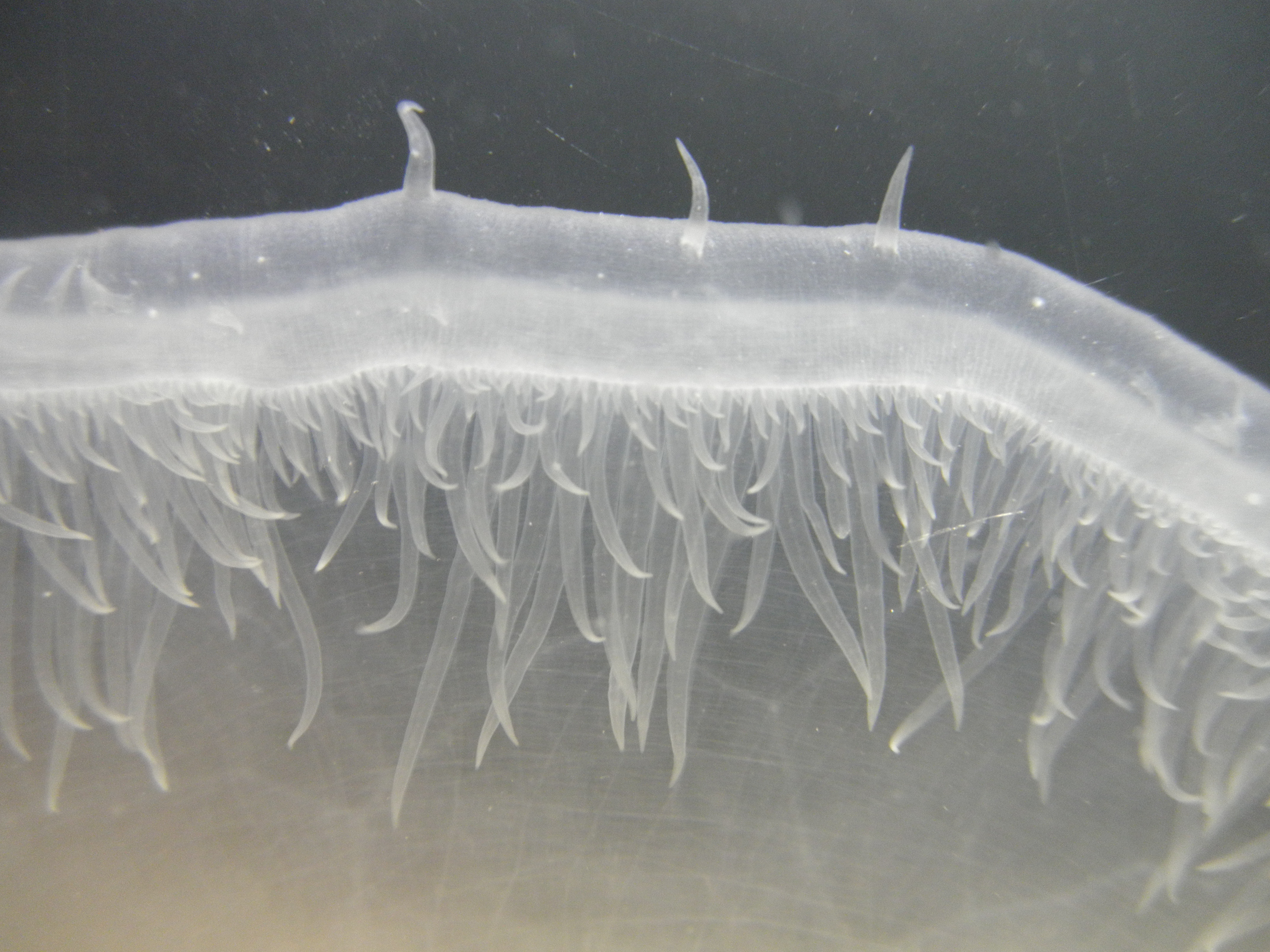
Photo of detail of frontal part of oral velum of Tethys fimbria from the ventral side

== Ecology ==
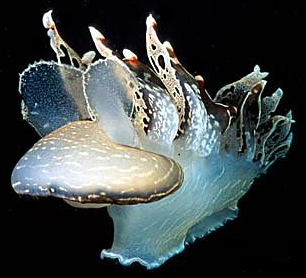
Tethys fimbria can swim well. This image shows its broad oral hood on the left, and its sweeping cerata.

The habitat of Tethys fimbria is seas which have sand or mud on the bottom, in depths from 20 to 150 m.

Tethys fimbria captures and feeds on small crustaceans. It uses its broad hood for catching them.

The cerata can be self-amputated (autotomy) as a defence mechanism when the slug is in danger.

Within the mantle large amounts of prostaglandins are produced. Subsequently the prostoglandins are moved to the cerata. The biosynthesis of prostgandins has been studied by Marzo et al. (1991).
