= Nonlabens spongiae =

Scientific classification
- Domain: Bacteria
- Kingdom: Pseudomonadati
- Phylum: Bacteroidota
- Class: Flavobacteriia
- Order: Flavobacteriales
- Family: Flavobacteriaceae
- Genus: Nonlabens
- Species: N. spongiae

Binomial name
- Nonlabens spongiae (Lau et al. 2006) Yi and Chun 2012

Type strain
- UST030701-156

Synonyms
- Stenothermobacter spongiae

Bacterium

Nonlabens spongiae is a Gram-negative, strictly aerobic, rod-shaped and motile bacterium from the genus of Nonlabens which has been isolated from a marine sponge from the Bahamas.
