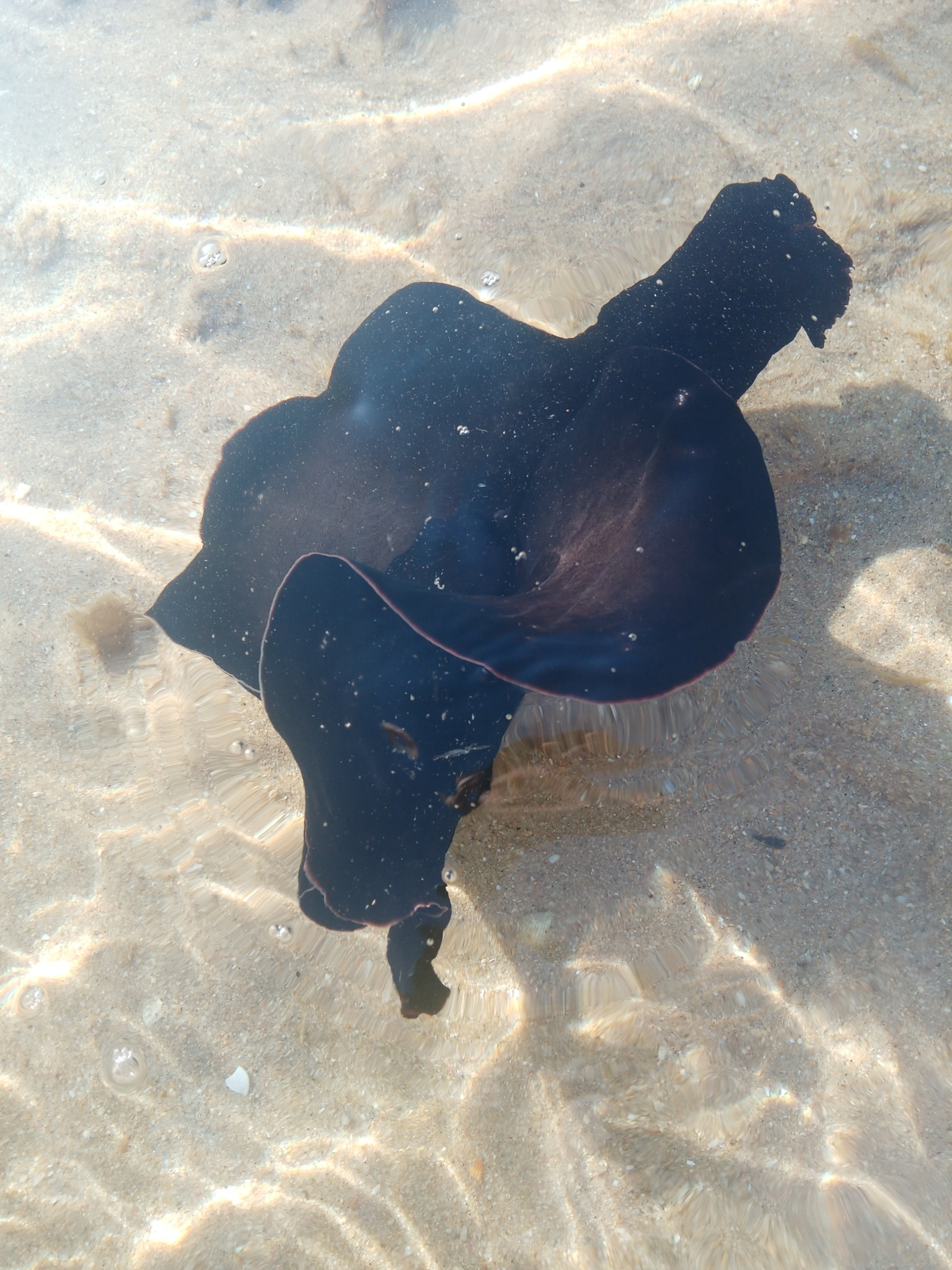

Scientific classification
- Kingdom: Animalia
- Phylum: Mollusca
- Class: Gastropoda
- Order: Aplysiida
- Family: Aplysiidae
- Genus: Aplysia
- Species: A. fasciata

Binomial name
- Aplysia fasciata Poiret, 1789

Synonyms
- List: Aplysia gracilis Eales, 1960 ·; Aplysia lobiancoi Mazzarelli, 1890; Aplysia marmorata Blainville, 1823 ·; Aplysia neapolitana Delle Chiaje, 1824; Aplysia radiata Crouch, 1826; Aplysia sicula Swainson, 1840; Aplysia vulgaris Blainville, 1823 ·; Aplysia willcoxi Heilprin, 1887; Aplysia winneba Eales, 1957; Laplysia alba Cuvier, 1803; Laplysia camelus Cuvier, 1803; Laplysia fasciata Poiret, 1789; Tethys willcoxi (Heilprin, 1887); Tethys floridensis Pilsbry, 1895; Tethys willcoxi (Heilprin, 1887)

= Aplysia fasciata =

Species of gastropod

Aplysia fasciata, common name the "mottled sea hare", or the "sooty sea hare", is an Atlantic species of sea hare or sea slug, a marine opisthobranch gastropod mollusk in the family Aplysiidae.

== Distribution ==
This sea hare occurs in the Western Atlantic from New Jersey to Brazil, and in the Eastern Atlantic including the Mediterranean and the West African coast. They have also been sighted along the Atlantic coast of France. It is a rare visitor to the seas off the southern British Isles (the related A. punctata is regular along most British coasts, as well as the northeast Atlantic).

Some consider the species Aplysia brasiliana, found in the Atlantic coast of the Americas, to be a synonym of Aplysia fasciata with just a different regional colour pattern.

== Description ==
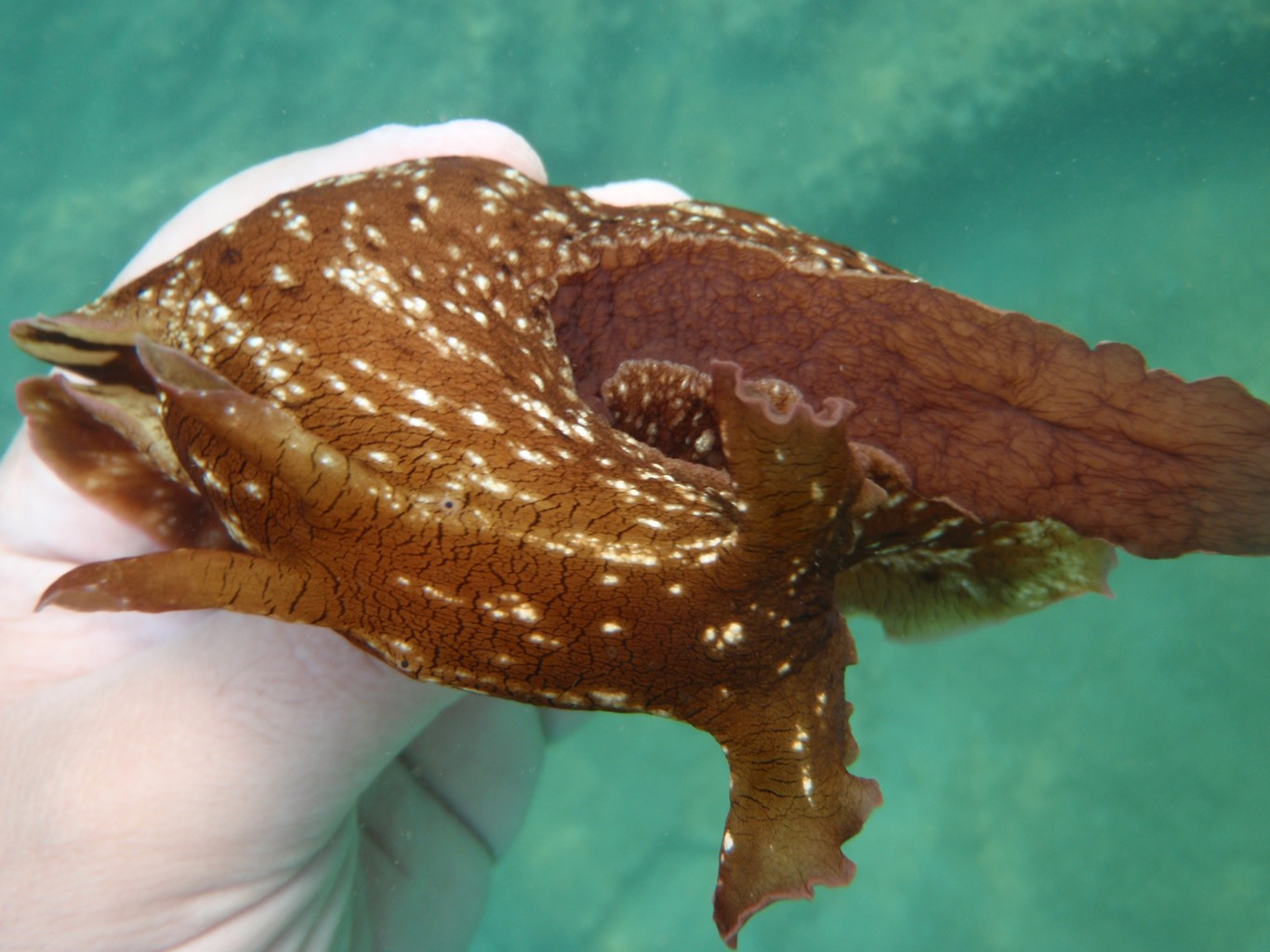
A brown Aplysia fasciata displaying mottled white spots.

Aplysia fasciata can grow to sizes up to 40 cm long. Coloring is often black or a very dark brown, sometimes with a thin red border to the parapodia, foot, and tentacles. Many also have mottled spots which span across their body, earning the name "mottled sea hare". Aplysia fasciata have, like most sea slugs, two oral tentacles and two more smaller rhinopores in front on their neck. Eyes are positioned in front of the rhinopores. Small, rounded "tails" are fixed to their hindside. A mantle covers its gills and internal organs. Inside the mantle, a thin, delicate inner shell lays. The shell is concave, with amber coloring and a slightly hooked apex. Inside the mantle is the ink gland.

The shell is rather solid, broad, and obliquely subquadrate. It is tumid (swollen), arched, and pale brown, with a testaceous (shelly) interior and light concentric striations. The apex is elevated, incurved, and calloused. The upper margin is short and slightly excavated. The outer lip is convex and produced anteriorly. The lower margin is oblique and widely excavated, while the dorsal margin is thickened and rather calloused.

== Behavior ==
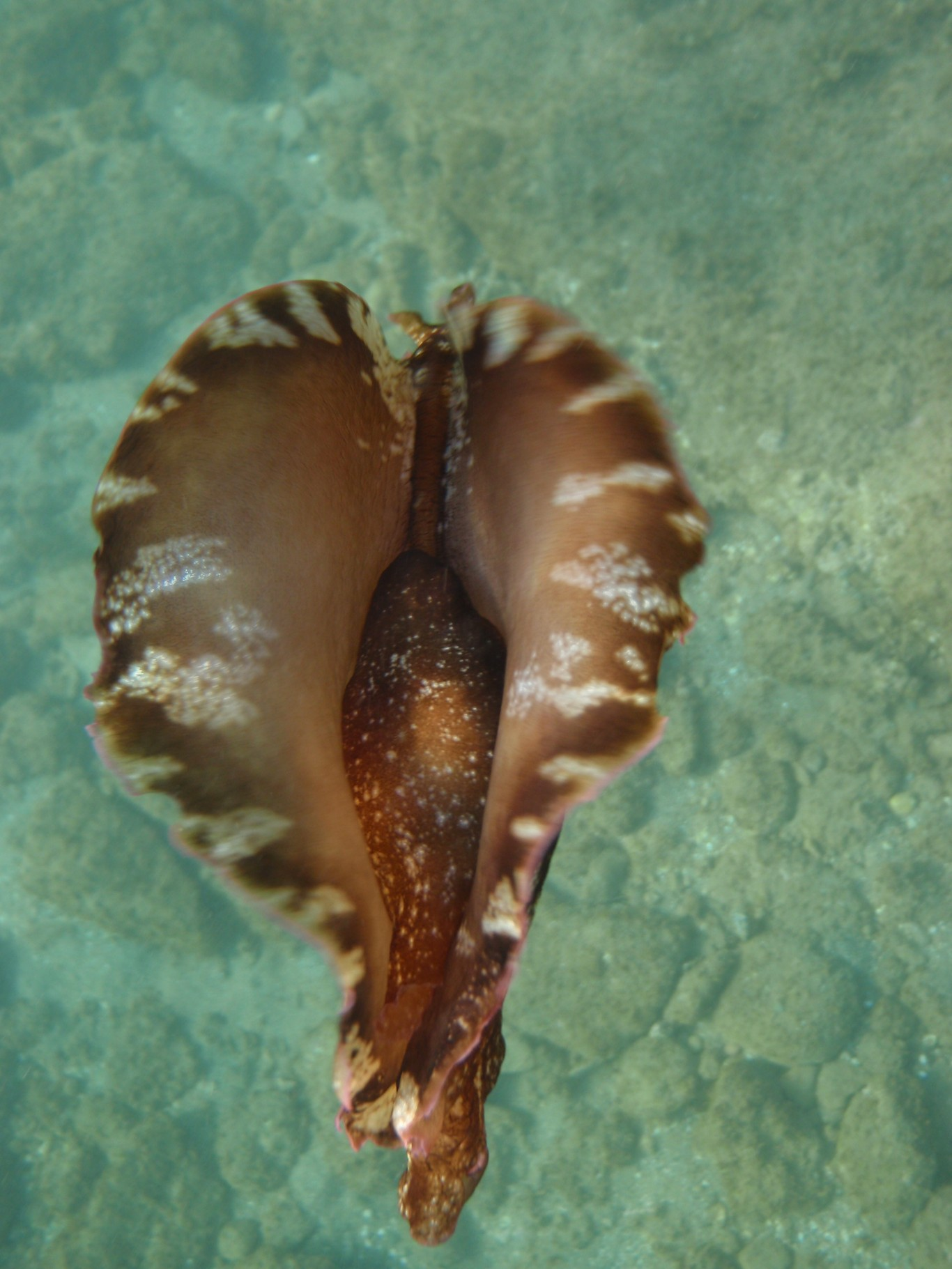
Parapodia of an Aplysia fasciata while swimming, from above.

Aplysia fasciata eat algae and seaweed attached to rocks and other surfaces. They are often seen swimming in groups, along tide pools and rocks.

These sea hares also secrete a sort of ink. The ink takes on a purple hue, a result of eating red algae. It is believed to be non-toxic, though is assumed that the ink is secreted as a result of a sort of physical "assault" on the sea hare.

Egg masses appear as a long, pale cream mass. They are somewhat noodle-like in appearance.

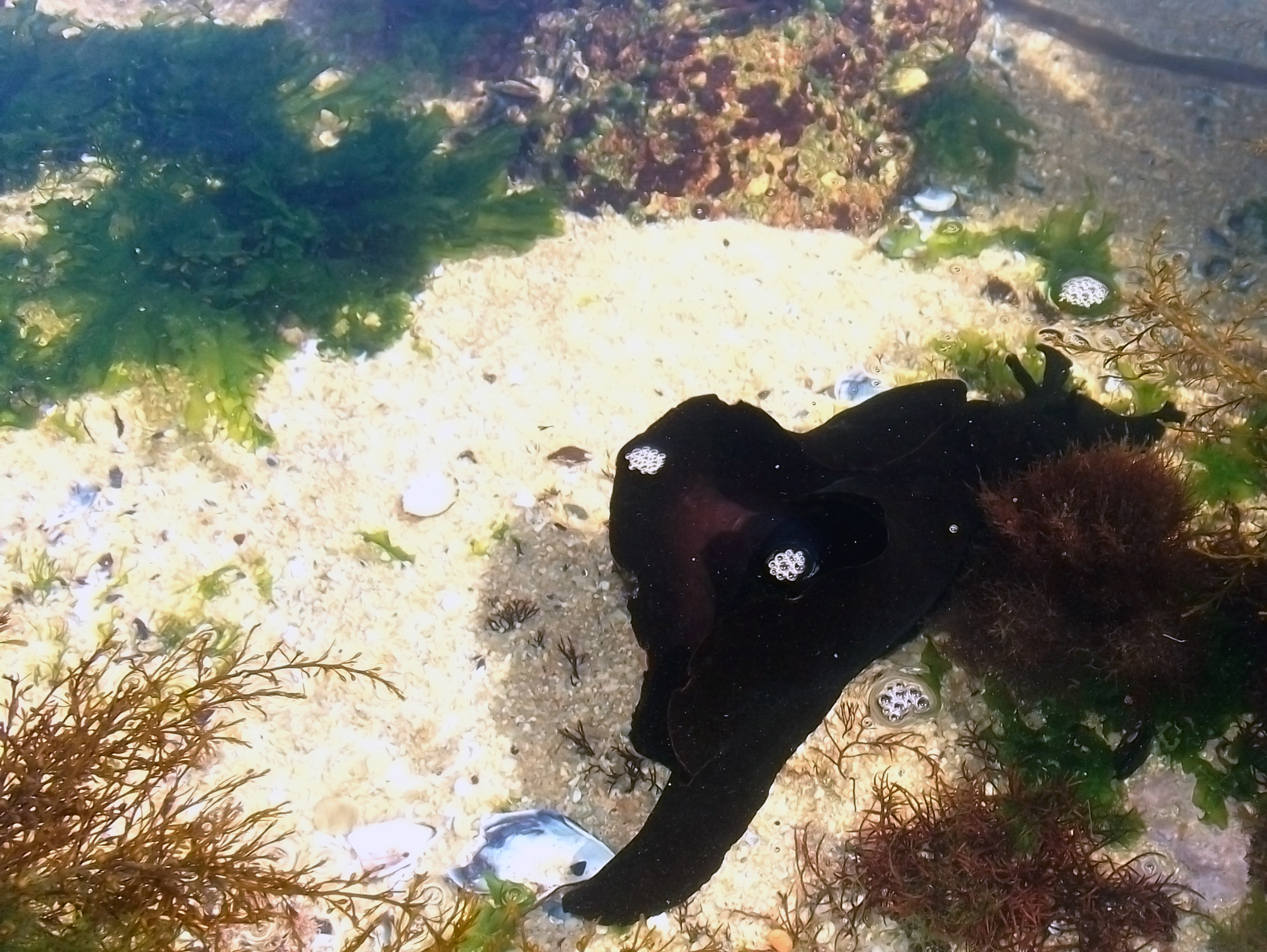
A sea hare swimming in a tide pool in Póvoa de Varzim, Portugal.

Aplysia fasciata are known for their "graceful" swimming. They often flap their parapodia, often being described as "flapping wings".
