= Nonlabens halophilus =

Scientific classification
- Domain: Bacteria
- Kingdom: Pseudomonadati
- Phylum: Bacteroidota
- Class: Flavobacteriia
- Order: Flavobacteriales
- Family: Flavobacteriaceae
- Genus: Nonlabens
- Species: N. halophilus

Binomial name
- Nonlabens halophilus Oh et al. 2017

Type strain
- CAU 1131

Bacterium

Nonlabens halophilus is a Gram-negative, aerobic, non-spore-forming, rod-shaped and non-motile bacterium from the genus of Nonlabens.
