= Nonlabens marina =

Scientific classification
- Domain: Bacteria
- Kingdom: Pseudomonadati
- Phylum: Bacteroidota
- Class: Flavobacteriia
- Order: Flavobacteriales
- Family: Flavobacteriaceae
- Genus: Nonlabens
- Species: N. marina

Binomial name
- Nonlabens marina Park et al. 2013

Type strain
- S1-08

Bacterium

Nonlabens marina is a Gram-negative, aerobic and rod-shaped bacterium from the genus of Nonlabens which has been isolated from seawater from the Pacific Ocean.
