= Nonlabens =

Scientific classification
- Domain: Bacteria
- Kingdom: Pseudomonadati
- Phylum: Bacteroidota
- Class: Flavobacteriia
- Order: Flavobacteriales
- Family: Flavobacteriaceae
- Genus: Nonlabens; Lau et al. 2005

Type species
- Nonlabens tegetincola

Species
- N. aestuariivivens N. agnitus N. antarcticus N. arenilitoris N. dokdonensis N. halophilus N. marina N. marinus N. mediterranea N. ponticola N. sediminis N. spongiae N. tegetincola N. ulvanivorans N. xiamenensis N. xylanidelens

Synonyms
- Donghaeana; Persicivirga; Sandarakinotalea; Stenothermobacter

Genus of bacteria

Nonlabens is a Gram-negative, strictly aerobic, non-spore-forming and non-motile genus of bacteria from the family of Flavobacteriaceae.
