= Nonlabens xylanidelens =

Scientific classification
- Domain: Bacteria
- Kingdom: Pseudomonadati
- Phylum: Bacteroidota
- Class: Flavobacteriia
- Order: Flavobacteriales
- Family: Flavobacteriaceae
- Genus: Nonlabens
- Species: N. xylanidelens

Binomial name
- Nonlabens xylanidelens (O'Sullivan et al. 2006) Yi and Chun 2012

Type strain
- SW256

Synonyms
- Persicivirga xylanidelens

Bacterium

Nonlabens xylanidelens is a species of gram-negative bacterium from the genus of Nonlabens.
