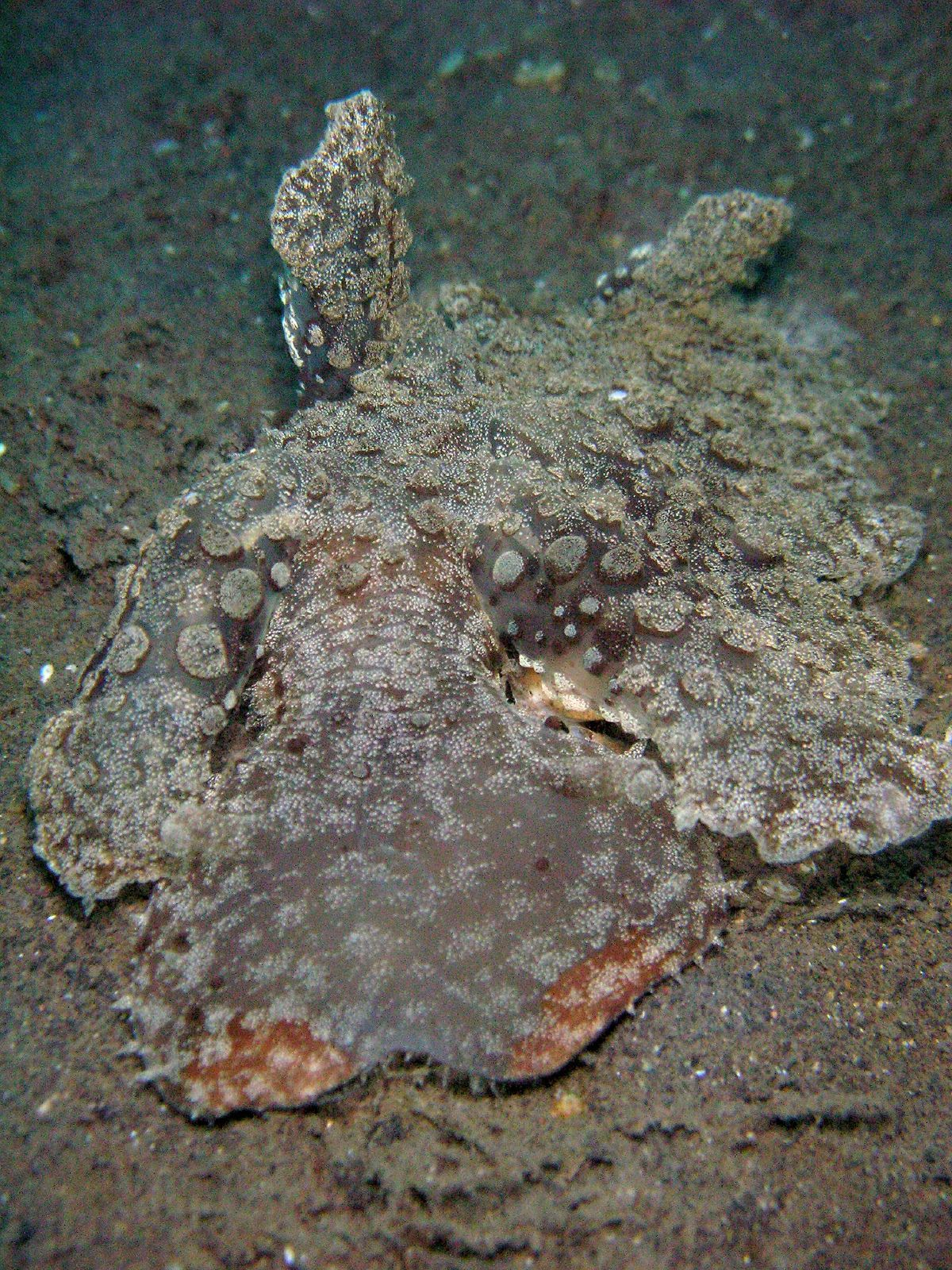
- Melibe viridis, anterior end at the front with the large rounded oral hood

Scientific classification
- Domain: Eukaryota
- Kingdom: Animalia
- Phylum: Mollusca
- Class: Gastropoda
- Order: Nudibranchia
- Suborder: Cladobranchia
- Family: Tethydidae
- Genus: Melibe; Rang, 1829

Species
- 17 species (see text)

Synonyms
- Chiroraera Gould, 1852; Jacunia Filippi, 1867; Melibaea Angas, 1864; Meliboea Kelaart, 1858; Propomelibe Allan, 1932

= Melibe =

Genus of gastropods

Melibe is a genus of sea slugs, nudibranchs, marine gastropod mollusks in the family Tethydidae.

Most nudibranchs are carnivores, but their prey is usually sessile or slow-moving animals such as sponges or bryozoans. In contrast, Melibe is an active predator which traps fast-moving free-swimming animals such as small crustaceans, using its extendable oral hood.

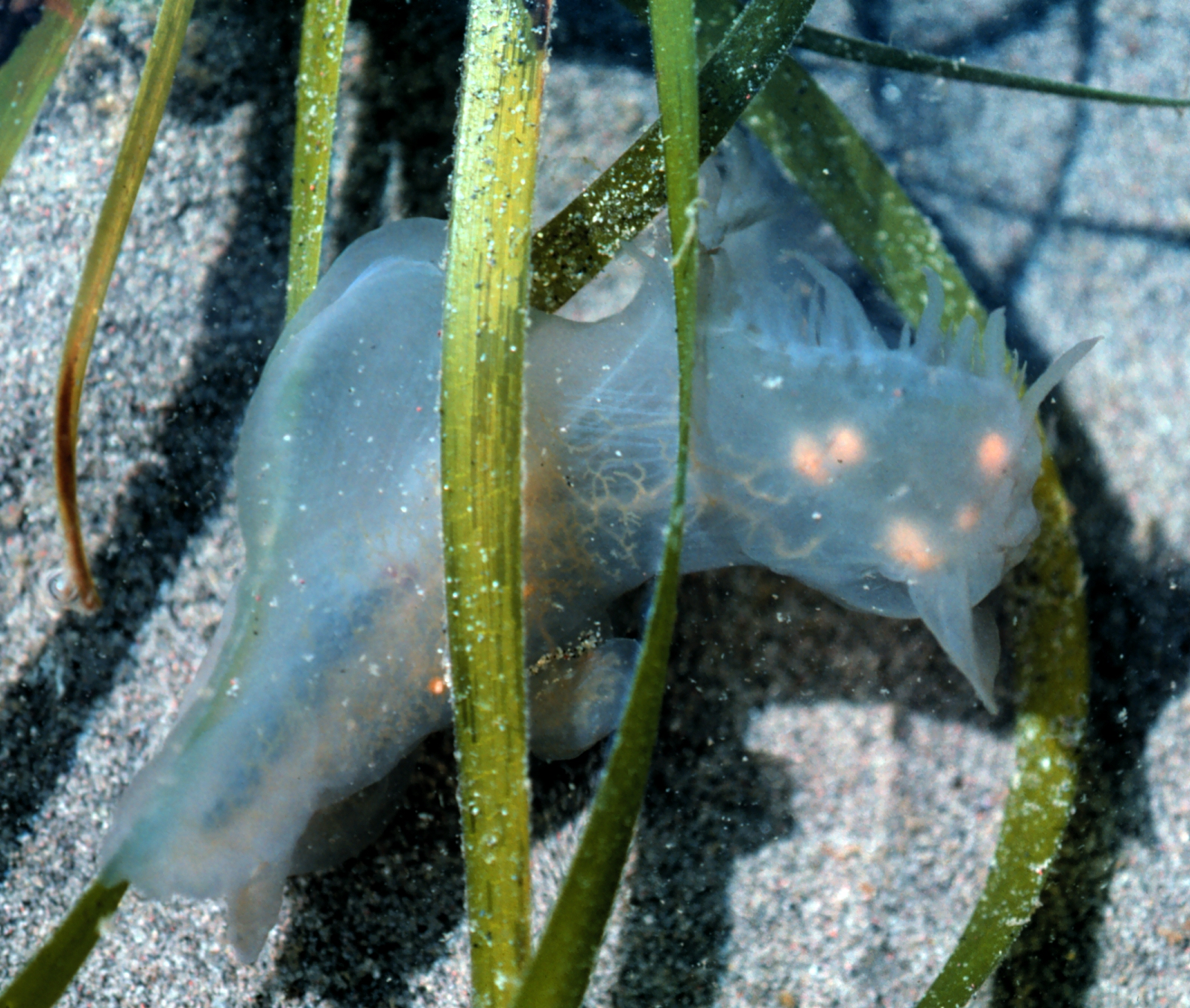
Melibe leonina

== Species ==
Species within the genus Melibe include 17 valid species:

- Melibe arianeae Espinoza, DuPont & Valdés, 2013
- Melibe australis (Angas, 1864)
- Melibe bucephala Bergh, 1902
- Melibe colemani Gosliner & Pola, 2012
- Melibe coralophilia Gosliner & Pola, 2012
- Melibe digitata Gosliner & V. G. Smith, 2003
- Melibe engeli Risbec, 1937
- Melibe leonina (Gould, 1852)
- Melibe liltvedi Gosliner, 1987
- Melibe maugeana Burn, 1960
- Melibe megaceras Gosliner, 1987
- Melibe minuta Gosliner & V. G. Smith, 2003
- Melibe papillosa (de Filippi, 1867)
- Melibe pilosa Pease, 1860
- Melibe rosea Rang, 1829
- Melibe tuberculata Gosliner & V. G. Smith, 2003
- Melibe viridis (Kelaart, 1858)

Species inquirenda:

- Melibe capucina Bergh, 1875
- Melibe lonchocera (E. von Martens, 1879)
- Melibe ocellata Bergh, 1888
