= Nonlabens dokdonensis =

Scientific classification
- Domain: Bacteria
- Kingdom: Pseudomonadati
- Phylum: Bacteroidota
- Class: Flavobacteriia
- Order: Flavobacteriales
- Family: Flavobacteriaceae
- Genus: Nonlabens
- Species: N. dokdonensis

Binomial name
- Nonlabens dokdonensis (Yoon et al. 2006) Yi and Chun 2012

Type strain
- DSW-6

Synonyms
- Donghaea dokdonensis, Donghaeana dokdonensis, Eastseaea dokdonensis, Persicivirga dokdonensis

Bacterium

Nonlabens dokdonensis is a Gram-negative, non-spore-forming, rod-shaped and non-motile bacterium from the genus of Nonlabens which has been isolated from sea water.
