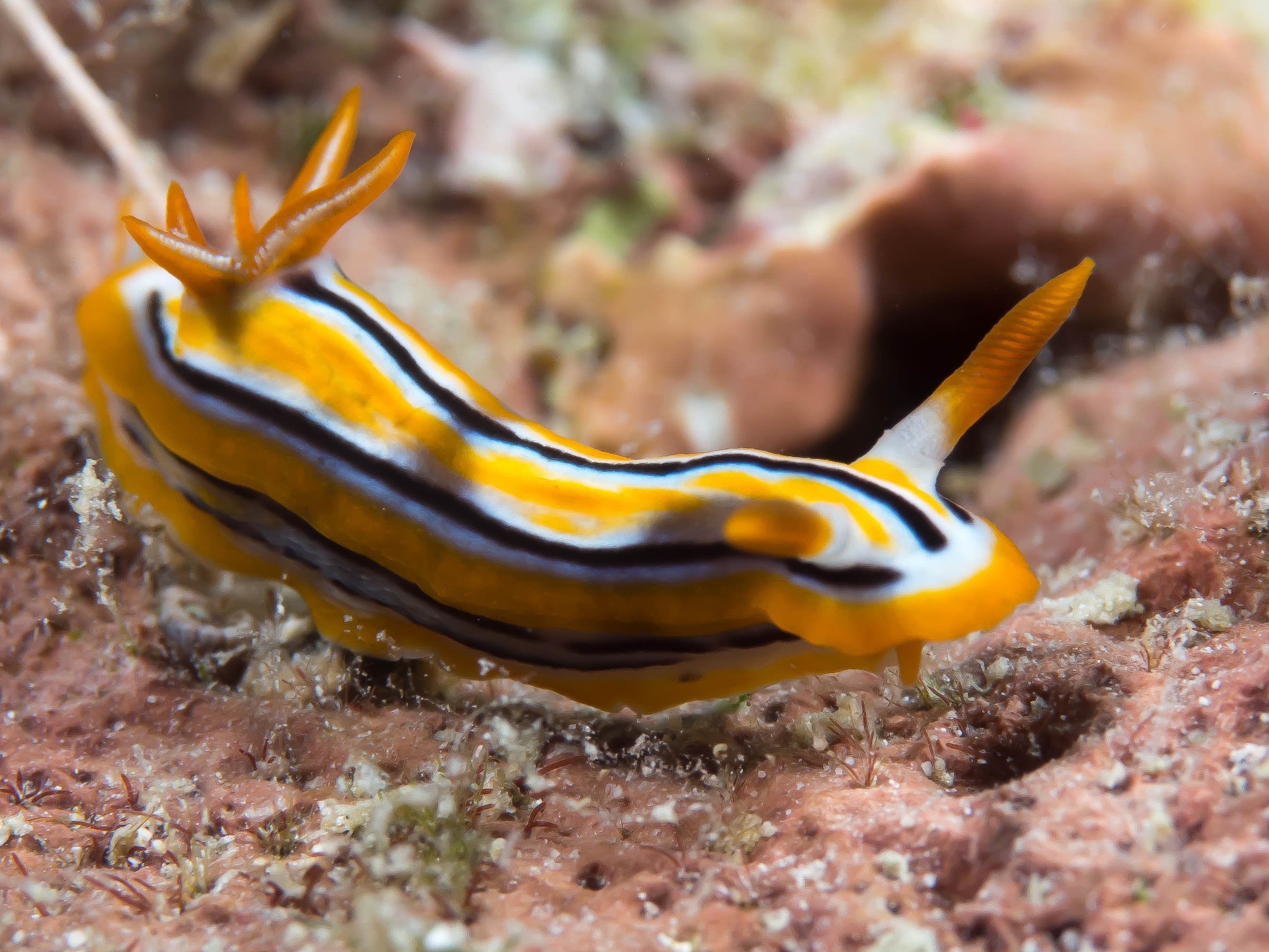

Scientific classification
- Kingdom: Animalia
- Phylum: Mollusca
- Class: Gastropoda
- Order: Nudibranchia
- Family: Chromodorididae
- Genus: Chromodoris
- Species: C. colemani

Binomial name
- Chromodoris colemani Rudman, 1982

= Chromodoris colemani =

Species of gastropod

Chromodoris colemani is a species of sea slug in the family Chromodorididae. It is named after Neville Coleman, an Australian diver and publisher of several popular books on diving and marine biology of the South Pacific area.

== Distribution ==
This species was described from Lizard Island, Queensland, Australia. It has been reported from Japan, the Marshall Islands, the Philippines and Western Australia.

== Description ==
Chromodoris colemani has a white mantle with typically five, thin, longitudinal, black lines interspersed with diffuse light brown lines. The two outer lines start in front of the rhinophores and run parallel to the mantle rim, meeting behind the gills but usually not joining. The mid dorsal line starts as a circular patch in front of the rhinophores and runs to the gills. There is a broad submarginal band of pale orange. Animals from the Marshall Islands are the best fit with the original description. They suggest that the area covered with black lines can be pale blue and the lines can break into dashes and have a marginal rather than submarginal orange border to the mantle. There is a suggestion that this species can mimic Chromodoris westraliensis but all animals from the western Australian and Philippines areas are a poor fit for the original description.
