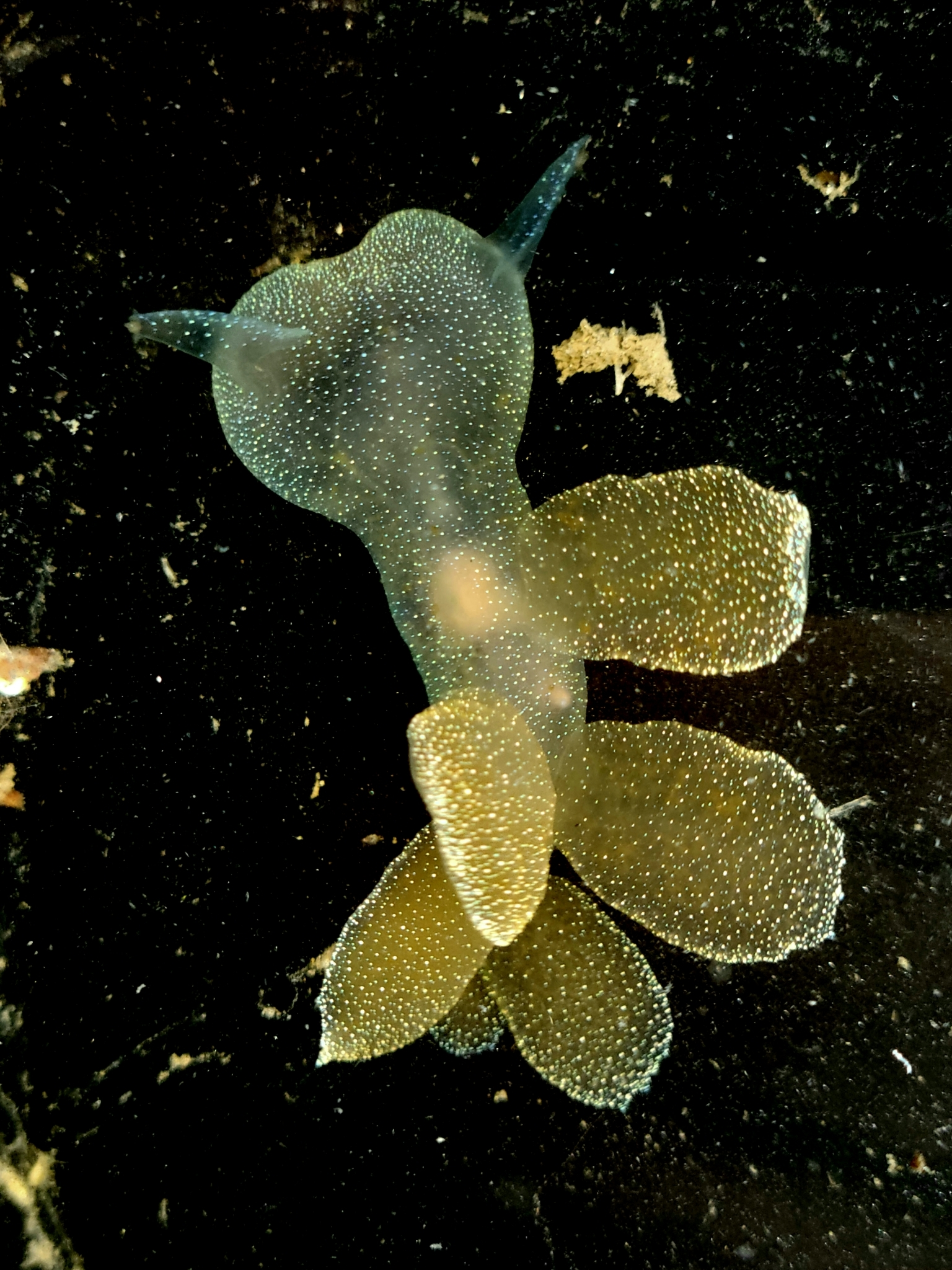

Scientific classification
- Kingdom: Animalia
- Phylum: Mollusca
- Class: Gastropoda
- Order: Nudibranchia
- Suborder: Dendronotacea
- Family: Tethydidae
- Genus: Melibe
- Species: M. leonina

Binomial name
- Melibe leonina (A. Gould, 1852)

Synonyms
- Chioraera dalli Heath, 1917; Chioraera leonina Gould, 1852; Melibe pellucida Bergh, 1904

= Melibe leonina =

Hooded nudibranch

Species of gastropod

Melibe leonina, commonly referred to as the hooded nudibranch, lion nudibranch, or lion's mane nudibranch, is a species of predatory nudibranch in the family Tethydidae.

== Description ==
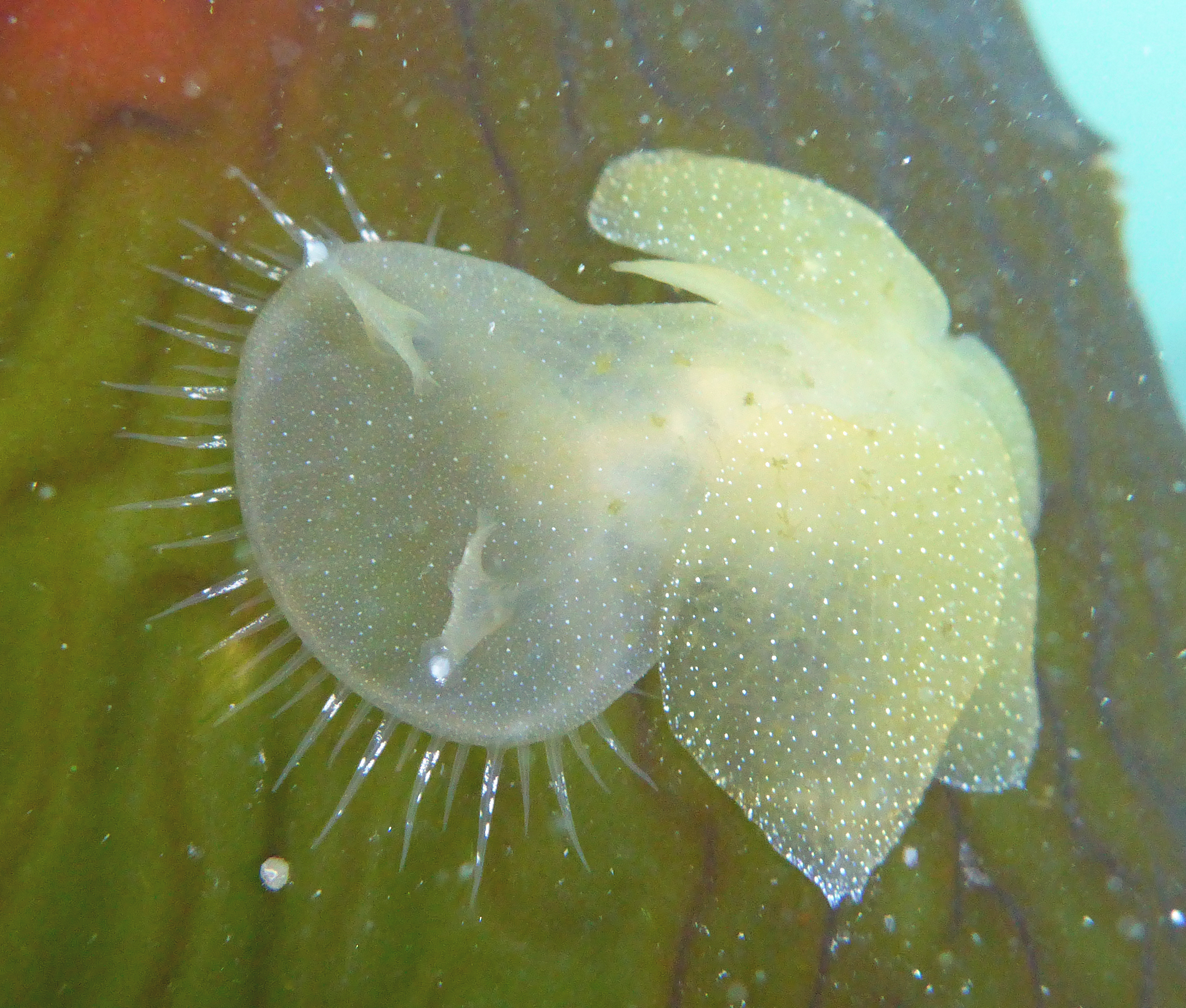
Melibe leonina from Santa Cruz, California.

The body of M. leonina is translucent and is usually colorless to pale yellow or green. The average body dimensions are 102mm long and 25mm wide. It has a large expandable oral hood, fringed with two rows of cirri. The oral hood is typically over 51mm wide. This species of Melibe lacks jaws or a radula.

There are a single pair of rhinophores on the hood that contain four to six lamellae. Two rows containing three to six pairs of flat, paddle-shaped cerata run along the body. The cerata range in size, with the front most cerata being the largest. Cerata are capable of autotomy. There are unique granule-filled cells at the base of the cerata that are found nowhere else in the animal that seem to be involved in breaking down connective tissue, as well as two special muscular sphincters. It is thought that after the connective tissue is broken down, these sphincters contract to cut the cerata and then close the wound. The anus and nephroproct are positioned before the second ceras. All other members of the genus Melibe contain chitinous plates in the stomach; however, they are absent in M. leonina.

== Distribution ==
This species occurs in the eastern Pacific Ocean from Alaska to Baja California. M. leonina is the only member of the genus Melibe found on the Pacific coast of North America.

== Ecology ==
=== Habitat ===
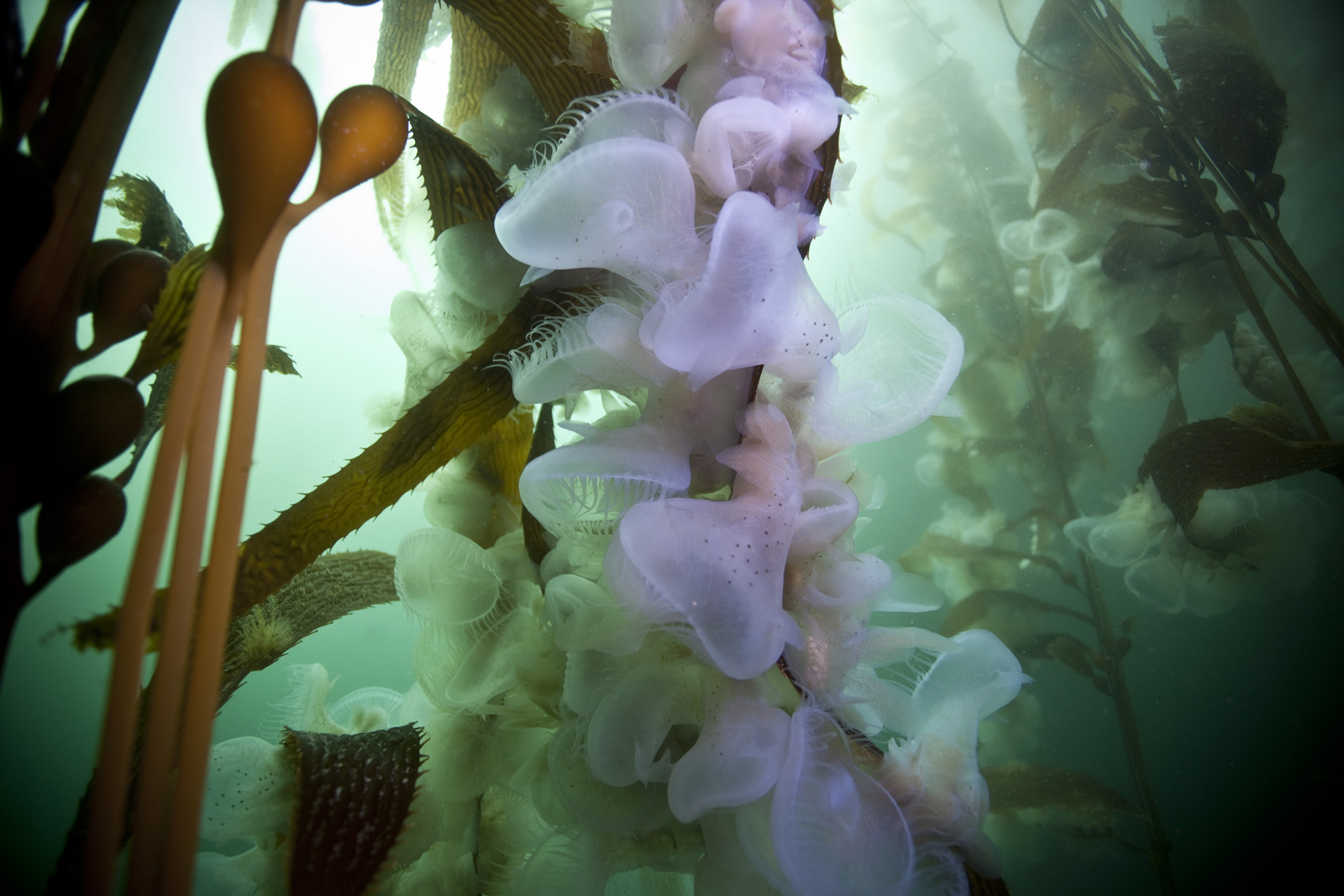
Melibe leonina in kelp forest

Melibe leonina are common on seagrass and blades of Macrocystis kelp within their range, from the lower intertidal to approximately 37m.

=== Reproduction ===
Melibe leonina is a simultaneous hermaphrodite, with its female and male reproductive organs located on the right side of the body. Fertilization occurs internally, and individuals can lay up to 30,000 eggs at a time. Both females and males lay eggs in protective ribbons that are secreted from the mucous gland. Ribbons contain egg capsules with 15 - 25 eggs. The eggs will turn into larvae after about 10 days and then hatch and become veligers. They are born with shells initially, but lose them after they hatch. Mating has only been observed during the day.

=== Feeding habits ===
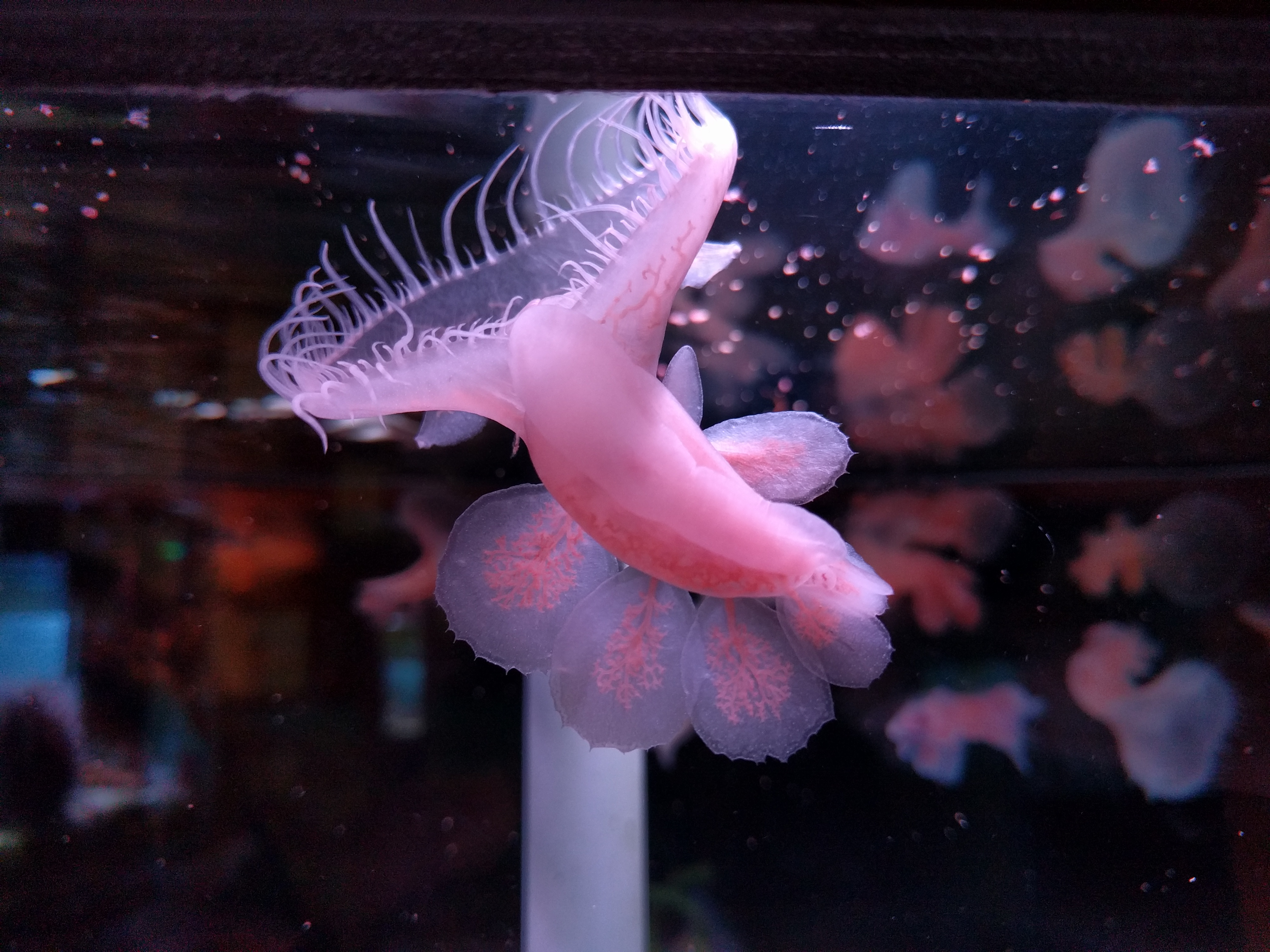
Melibe leonina in aquaria

While most nudibranchs are predators of sessile benthic organisms, M. leonina feeds on planktonic invertebrates. M. leonina is carnivorous and has been observed eating several types of planktonic crustaceans, including amphipods, copepods, ostracods, and various types of larvae. M. leonina lack any features associated with chewing, so prey are swallowed whole. M. leonina have been observed displaying feeding behavior even in the complete absence of food.

Adults and juveniles display different feeding behaviors, however, they both feed by first attaching their foot firmly to its substratum. Adults feed by pulling back their oral hood until it is almost perpendicular to the body, and then thrust it forward until contact is made with a prey organism. Once prey has been contacted, the hood closes and the rows of cirri interlock to prevent escape. The hood is compressed further, pushing excess water out and forcing the prey towards the mouth. Closing the oral hood takes approximately 4 seconds. In aquarium settings, M. leonina have been observed exhibiting different feeding strategies, including surface floating and bottom grazing.

Juveniles start with their hood nearly parallel to their substratum. As they move their body forward, they bring their hood down until it makes contact with the substratum. Water is pushed from the hood once contact has been made with the substratum, and prey is forced towards the mouth. Researchers believe that the differences in feeding behaviors indicate that adults feed from the water and juveniles feed directly from the substratum. Juveniles feed during the day or night, while adults feed exclusively at night.

=== Predators ===
There have been very few observations of predation on M. leonina; the few known observations of predation have mostly involved the crab Pugettia producta and the main defense against predation is thought to be its ability to produce an odorous secretion called a terpenoid that is repellent to other organisms. The gland that produces these secretions are known as repugnatorial glands. Some sources have described the secretion as a watermelon-like smell. Because M. leonina prey are not known to produce secondary metabolites it is thought that they biosynthesis their own terpenoids. Other predators include red rock crabs, dungeness crabs, graceful crabs, and various other water-dwelling arthropods.

=== Locomotion ===
Melibe leonina are capable swimmers; however, they have rarely been observed leaving their substratum. M. leonina swim through a behavior known as lateral bending. Individuals swim by first closing their oral hood and releasing themselves from their substrate. Next, they curl their foot and extend their cerata. They then flatten their body laterally, to create more surface area. To propel themselves forward they bend their body from side to side, forming a "C" shape. M. leonina are capable of trapping air in their hood for buoyancy.

Studies have shown that M. leonina individuals regularly move to other kelp blades, but have rarely been observed swimming during the day in nature. This has led researchers to speculate that M. leonina swim mostly at night. Experiments in a laboratory setting have supported this theory; showing that on average M. leonina swim 20 times more often at night.
