= Nonlabens arenilitoris =

Scientific classification
- Domain: Bacteria
- Kingdom: Pseudomonadati
- Phylum: Bacteroidota
- Class: Flavobacteriia
- Order: Flavobacteriales
- Family: Flavobacteriaceae
- Genus: Nonlabens
- Species: N. arenilitoris

Binomial name
- Nonlabens arenilitoris Park et al. 2013

Type strain
- M-M3

Bacterium

Nonlabens arenilitoris is a Gram-negative, aerobic, non-spore-forming, rod-shaped and non-motile bacterium from the genus of Nonlabens which has been isolated from marine sand from the coast of South Korea.
