= Nonlabens aestuariivivens =

Scientific classification
- Domain: Bacteria
- Kingdom: Pseudomonadati
- Phylum: Bacteroidota
- Class: Flavobacteriia
- Order: Flavobacteriales
- Family: Flavobacteriaceae
- Genus: Nonlabens
- Species: N. aestuariivivens

Binomial name
- Nonlabens aestuariivivens Park et al. 2017

Type strain
- OITF-31

Bacterium

Nonlabens aestuariivivens is a Gram-negative, aerobic and non-motile bacterium from the genus of Nonlabens which has been isolated from tidal flat from Oido.
