= Neville Coleman =

Australian naturalist, underwater photographer, writer, publisher and educator

Neville Coleman OAM (1938 - 4 May 2012) was an Australian naturalist, underwater nature photographer, writer, publisher and educator.

Coleman started scuba diving in 1963, exploring Sydney Harbour. Later he joined a scientific study group and, in 1969, commenced a project aiming to document the entire marine life of Australia, using underwater photography.

His first book, Australian marine fishes in colour, was published in 1974 and he subsequently authored more than 50 books. His books included various texts for scuba divers, shell collectors, amateur naturalists and children, and typically took the forms of field guides, encyclopedias and dive guides. Departures included a collaboration with a poet and CD-ROM companions to printed publications, which included video clips of marine species. His photographs often appeared in publications by other authors on marine subjects.

In 2007 Coleman was inducted to the International Scuba Diving Hall of Fame and, in 2011, he was awarded the Medal of the Order of Australia (OAM) for "service to conservation and the environment through the photographic documentation of Australian marine species". Coleman died of natural causes at 4:55 am on 4 May 2012, in his sleep.

== Taxon named in his honor ==
Coleman discovered many marine creatures new to science. Several species of fish, nudibranchs and other invertebrates have been named after him, including:

- The mantis shrimp Lysiosquilla colemani
- The nudibranch Chromodoris colemani
- The pygmy seahorse Hippocampus colemani
- Coleman's melibe or ghost melibe Melibe colemani
- The Sand perch Parapercis colemani

== Legacy ==
Neville Coleman Memorial Dives are held annually, with special events including a sea slug photo competition and public art exhibition held in South Australia.

== Bibliography ==
Selected works
Title	Co-author	Year	Publisher	Location	ISBN	Reference
Australian marine fishes in colour		1974	Reed	Sydney	ISBN 0589071416	
Shell collecting in Australia		1976	Reed	Sydney	ISBN 0589071955	
A field guide to Australian marine life		1977	Rigby	Adelaide	ISBN 0727005200	
A look at the wildlife of the Great Barrier Reef		1978	Bay Books	Rushcutters Bay, NSW	ISBN 085835201X	
Scuba divers introduction to marine biology		1978	Australasian Marine Photographic Index			
The Australian beachcomber		1979	Collins		ISBN 0002164248	
Australian sea fishes south of 30s		1980	Doubleday	Sydney	ISBN 0868240184	
Australian sea fishes north of 30 S		1981	Doubleday	Sydney	ISBN 0868240338	
Fishes of Victoria		1981	Doubleday	Sydney	ISBN 0868240397	
The young observer's book of Australian seashells		1982	Methuen Australia	Sydney	ISBN 0454002998	
Harmful fishes of Australia		1982	Doubleday	Sydney	ISBN 0868240400	
Nudibranchs of Australasia	Richard C. Willan	1984	Australasian Marine Photographic Index	NSW	ISBN 094937301X	
Poetry in pictures: The Great Barrier Reef	Mark O'Connor	1985	Hale & Iremonger	Sydney	ISBN 0868062073	
The underwater Australia dive guide		1987	Nelson	Melbourne	ISBN 0170069192	
Australia's Great Barrier Reef		1990	Child & Associates	NSW	ISBN 086777343X, 0867773677	
Encyclopedia of marine animals		1991	Blandford	London	ISBN 0713722894	
Australia's sharks & rays		1992	Weldon Publishing	Sydney	ISBN 1863022627	
Discover underwater Australia		1994	National Book Distributors and Publishers	NSW	ISBN 1864360070	
Sea stars of Australasia and their relatives		1994	Neville Coleman's Underwater Geographic	Springwood, Queensland	ISBN 0947325212	
The dive sites of the Great Barrier Reef and Coral Sea. Comprehensive coverage of diving and snorkelling		1996	New Holland (Publishers) Ltd.	London, Cape Town, Sydney, Singapore		
Marine life of the Maldives		2000	Atoll	Apollo Bay, Victoria	ISBN 1876410361	
Underwater naturalist		2004	Neville Coleman's Underwater Geographic	Springwood, Queensland	ISBN 0947325298	
Fiji Islands: wildlife guide		2005	Neville Coleman's Underwater Geographic	Springwood, Queensland	ISBN 9780947325466	
Nudibranchs encyclopedia		2008	Neville Coleman's Underwater Geographic	Springwood, Queensland	ISBN 9780947325411	
Nudibranchs encyclopedia - 2nd edition		2015	underwater.com.au and Masalai Press	Australia, USA		
