= Nonlabens agnitus =

Scientific classification
- Domain: Bacteria
- Kingdom: Pseudomonadati
- Phylum: Bacteroidota
- Class: Flavobacteriia
- Order: Flavobacteriales
- Family: Flavobacteriaceae
- Genus: Nonlabens
- Species: N. agnitus

Binomial name
- Nonlabens agnitus Yi and Chun 2012

Bacterium

Nonlabens agnitus is a bacterium from the genus of Nonlabens.
