= Nonlabens antarcticus =

Scientific classification
- Domain: Bacteria
- Kingdom: Pseudomonadati
- Phylum: Bacteroidota
- Class: Flavobacteriia
- Order: Flavobacteriales
- Family: Flavobacteriaceae
- Genus: Nonlabens
- Species: N. antarcticus

Binomial name
- Nonlabens antarcticus Kwon et al. 2014

Type strain
- AKS622

Bacterium

Nonlabens antarcticus is a Gram-negative, strictly aerobic, psychrophilic and rod-shaped bacterium from the genus of Nonlabens which has been isolated from the core of a glacier from the King George Island.
