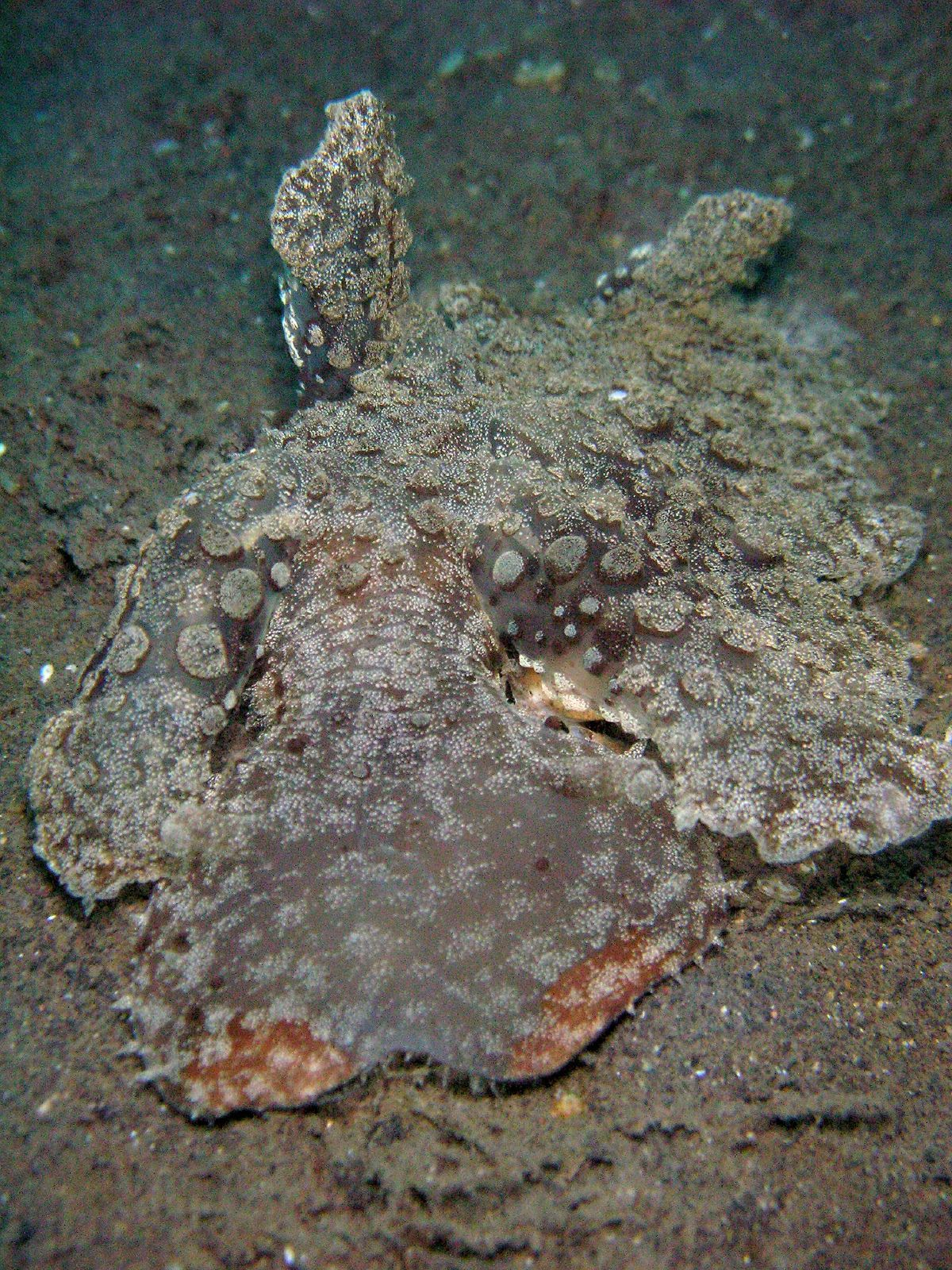
- Melibe viridis, anterior end at the front with the large rounded oral hood

Scientific classification
- Domain: Eukaryota
- Kingdom: Animalia
- Phylum: Mollusca
- Class: Gastropoda
- Order: Nudibranchia
- Suborder: Cladobranchia
- Family: Tethydidae
- Genus: Melibe
- Species: M. viridis

Binomial name
- Melibe viridis (Kelaart, 1858)

Synonyms
- Melibe fimbriata Alder & Hancock, 1864; Melibe rangi Bergh, 1875; Melibe vexillifera Bergh, 1880; Propomelibe mirifica Allan, 1932; Melibe mirifica Allan, 1932; Melibe japonica Eliot, 1913; Melibe fimbriata Alder & Hancock, 1864

= Melibe viridis =

Species of gastropod

Melibe viridis is a species of sea slug, a nudibranch, a marine gastropod mollusk in the family Tethydidae.

== Distribution ==
This species occurs in the Mediterranean Sea, the Red Sea, the Andaman Sea off Phuket, off Mozambique and off Indonesia. Its habitat is sandy and muddy areas between 3 m and 15 m deep.

== Description ==
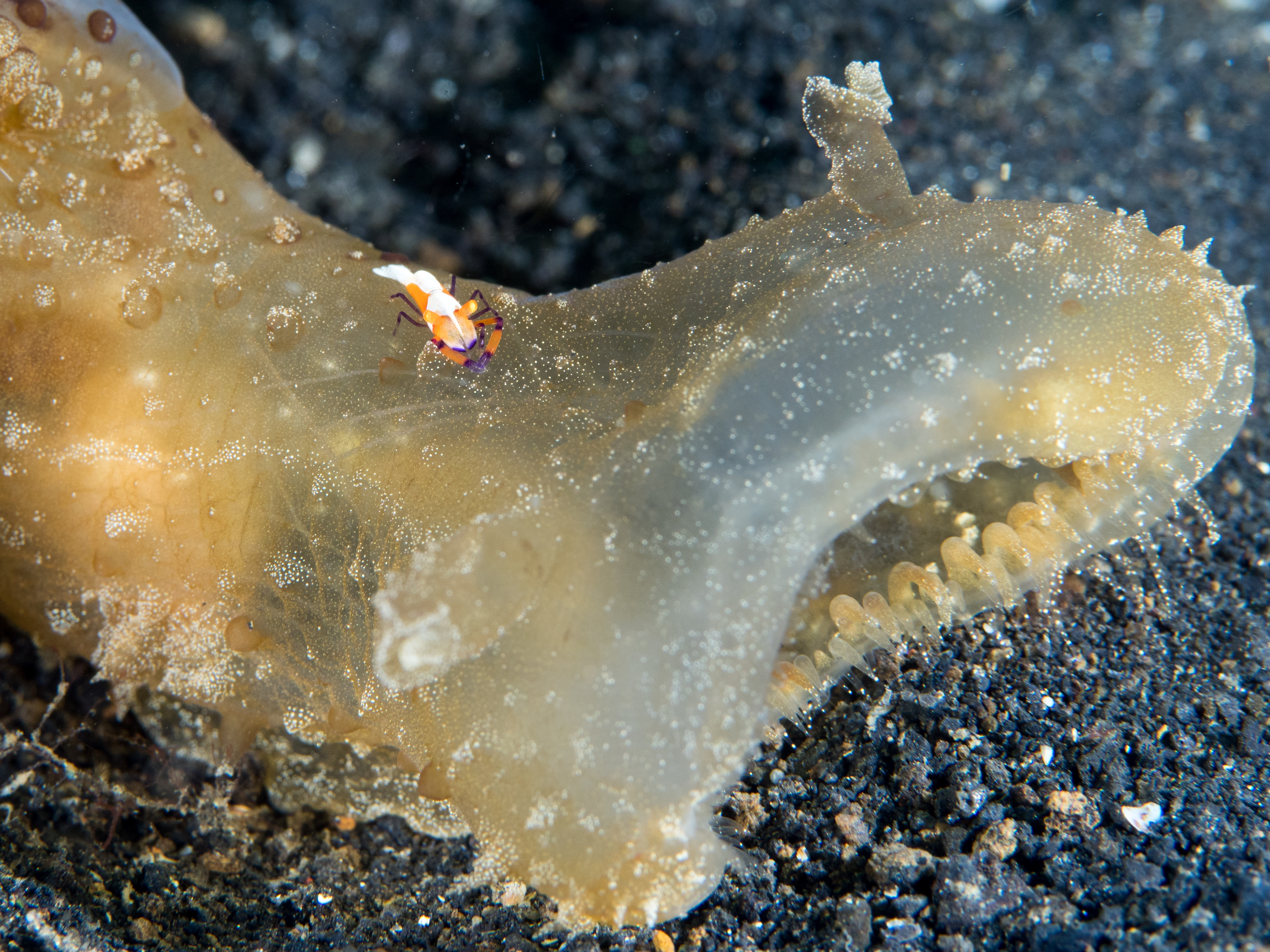
Melibe viridis with extended oral veil

The body reaches a length of 140 mm. Like some other nudibranch species, M. viridis has an oral veil that it uses to trap prey. This species has a particular morphology that easily distinguishes it from other nudibranchs. The body is elongated, beige to brown in color. The Melibe has a number of pairs of ceratas along the body, each of which acts as a gill. The ceratas are often darker in color than the body, sometimes with an orange apical part, their size decreasing towards the anterior part.
