= Megachile fimbriata =

Scientific classification
- Domain: Eukaryota
- Kingdom: Animalia
- Phylum: Arthropoda
- Class: Insecta
- Order: Hymenoptera
- Family: Megachilidae
- Genus: Megachile
- Species: M. fimbriata

Binomial name
- Megachile fimbriata Smith, 1853

Synonyms
- Megachile caerulea Friese, 1901; Megachile brachiata Vachal, 1909; Megachile sanguinea Friese, 1911; Megachile windhukiana Friese, 1916; Megachile bedfordi Cockerell, 1930; Megachile fimbriata kiambensis Cockerell, 1933; Megachile bedfordi var. kalaharica Cockerell, 1935; Megachile fimbriata vulpecula Pasteels, 1973

Species of leafcutter bee (Megachile)

Megachile fimbriata is a species of bee in the family Megachilidae. It was described by Smith in 1853.
