= Capparis mirifica =

Conservation status
- Critically Endangered (IUCN 3.1)

Scientific classification
- Kingdom: Plantae
- Clade: Tracheophytes
- Clade: Angiosperms
- Clade: Eudicots
- Clade: Rosids
- Order: Brassicales
- Family: Capparaceae
- Genus: Capparis
- Species: C. mirifica

Binomial name
- Capparis mirifica Standl.

Species of flowering plant

Capparis mirifica is a species of plant in the Capparaceae family. It is endemic to Panama. It is threatened by habitat loss.
