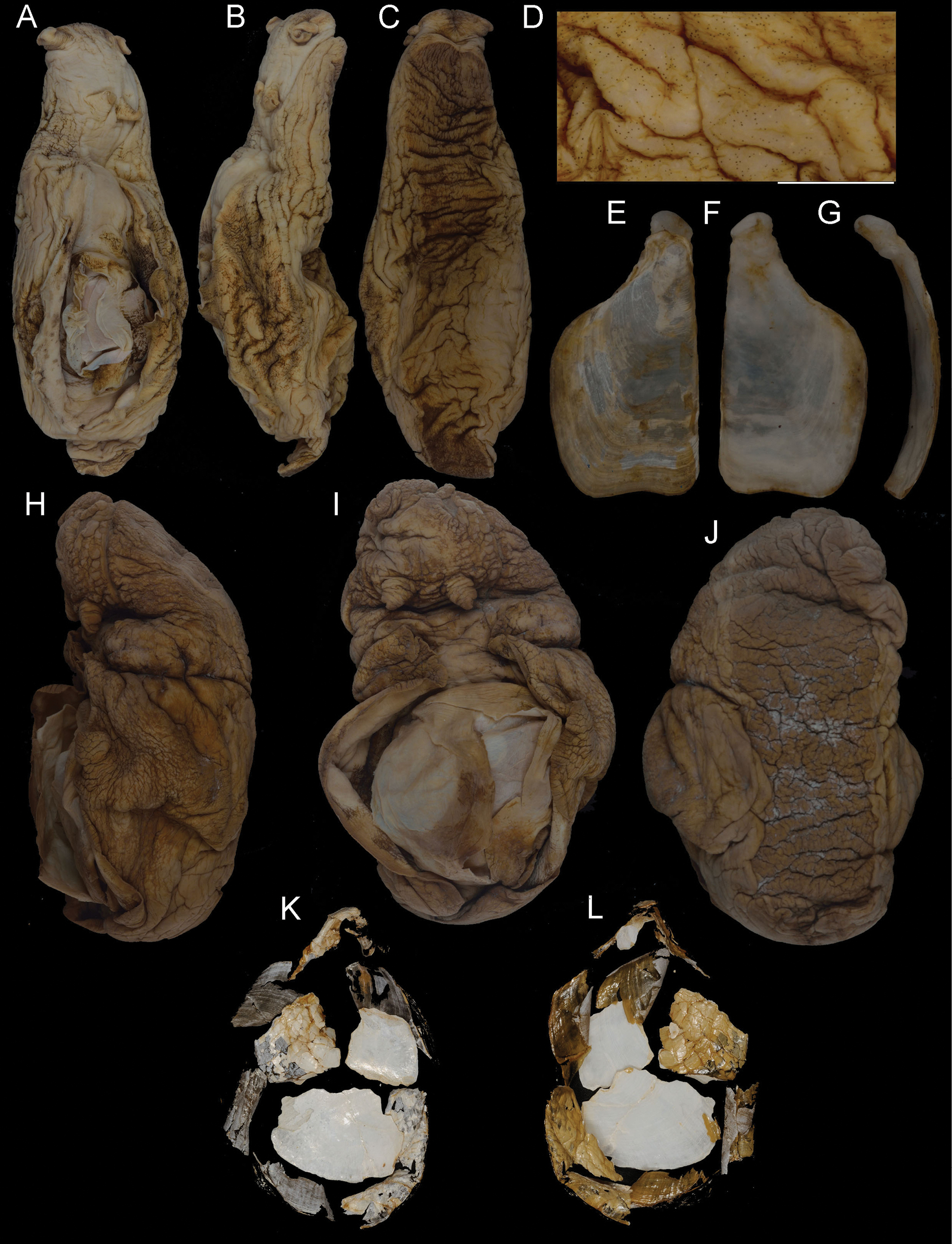
- Aplysia robertsi (holotype)

Scientific classification
- Kingdom: Animalia
- Phylum: Mollusca
- Class: Gastropoda
- Order: Aplysiida
- Family: Aplysiidae
- Genus: Aplysia
- Species: A. robertsi

Binomial name
- Aplysia robertsi (Pilsbry, 1895)

Synonyms
- Tethys robertsi Pilsbry, 1895 ·

= Aplysia robertsi =

Species of gastropod

Aplysia robertsi, the corn-bearing aplysia, is a species of gastropod mollusc in the genus Aplysia, family Aplysiidae.

== Description ==
(Original description) Length of alcoholic specimen: 11 cm. The general form is slender and elongated; the tail is unusually long, depressed, and extending well beyond the posterior insertion of the swimming lobes. Neck and head are elongated, with the mouth situated in a vertical fissure, as is typical for the group. The rhinophores are conical, each bearing a slit about halfway down; the minute rudimentary eyes lie slightly outward and only a little anterior to the base of the rhinophores.

The swimming lobes are entirely free from their anterior to posterior insertions, and are of moderate size. The mantle bears a minute, subcentral, conical tube; its free right border is broad and produced posteriorly into a folded lobe forming a rather long excurrent siphon. The opaline gland opens by a single large aperture. The penile foramen is located far forward—anterior to and below the right anterior tentacle, just above the front edge of the sole. The foot is fleshy, with the sole broad and emarginate anteriorly.

Color (in alcohol). — Dirty light olive, finely wrinkled and reticulated with blackish-brown markings that form a large cloud on the outer side of each swimming lobe and another on the face. The sole is blackish; the inner surface of the swimming lobes is blackish below and lightly stained outwardly in places. The mantle is clear olivaceous over the shell, with the free border and siphon blackish.

Shell. — Thin and fragile, with only a faint calcareous layer. The exterior is buff-colored. The apex is scarcely curved, with a narrow reflexed margin. The sinus is long, nearly straight, and distinctly margined. The length is 28 mm, width 22 mm.

== Distribution ==
This species occurs in the Mexican part of the North Pacific Ocean.
