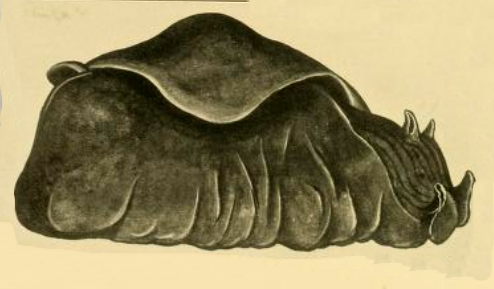
- Aplysia morio (holotype)

Scientific classification
- Kingdom: Animalia
- Phylum: Mollusca
- Class: Gastropoda
- Order: Aplysiida
- Family: Aplysiidae
- Genus: Aplysia
- Species: A. morio

Binomial name
- Aplysia morio (A. E. Verrill, 1901)

Synonyms
- Aplysia donca Ev. Marcus & Er. Marcus, 1960; Tethys morio Verrill, 1901

= Aplysia morio =

Species of gastropod

Aplysia morio, the Atlantic black sea hare or sooty sea hare, is a species of sea slug, a marine gastropod mollusk in the family Aplysiidae, the sea hares.

It lives in warm waters in the Caribbean Sea and off the south and southeastern coast of the United States, where it feeds on seaweed.

== Description ==
(Original description) A very large species, exceeding a foot in length; dark umber-brown or nearly black in color, without definite spots, but bearing black stripes on the head and possessing very large, broadly overlapping lateral flaps.

The body is thick and stout, swollen, and very obtuse posteriorly. The head and neck are also thick and robust (though perhaps not seen fully extended). The lateral natatorial flaps are very wide, overlapping by about half their breadth, entirely free posteriorly, and extending to the end of the short foot. The rhinophores are rather small and short, conical in shape. The tentacles are large, very broad, and foliaceous, with thin, expanded margins.

The body and outer surfaces of the flaps are very dark umber-brown or brownish-black, with a few obscure dusky blotches on the sides of the foot and a purplish tinge along the flap edges. The head, both above and on the sides, is marked with several narrow, purplish-black longitudinal stripes.

Length in life (not fully extended): 400 mm; height: 145 mm.

The shell is very thin, transparent, and pale yellow, oblong-ovate in form, obtusely rounded anteriorly, with a long posterior sinus that is only slightly incurved. The beak is rather prominent and scarcely incurved, with a reflexed membranous edge that also extends along both posterior margins. In the formalin-preserved specimen, no calcareous layer is present. The surface is concentrically undulated and faintly longitudinally grooved. The ratio of length to breadth is approximately 3:2 (length 60 mm; breadth 40 mm).

No mantle pore could be found, nor any distinct pore for the “opaline gland”; the latter likely discharges through numerous minute openings.

Aplysia morio is a bulky sea slug that can grow to a length of 30 cm (12 in) or more. It is usually dark chocolate brown to blackish in colour, and sometimes dark lines are visible on the head and flanks. The tentacles are curled and shaped rather like rabbit's ears. They are rich in nerve cells and are equipped with receptor organs. The shell is a fragile disc, hidden within the mantle, and the foot has large flaps at the side called parapodia which are used for swimming.

== Distribution and habitat ==
This species is found in the semi-tropical western Atlantic Ocean. Its range includes the eastern coast of the United States, Bermuda, the West Indies, Florida, the Caribbean Sea, the Gulf of Mexico and Venezuela. It typically lives in shallow water, down to depths of about 40 m (130 ft) in areas where there is little wave action. It is usually found on rocky surfaces among the algae that it feeds on, but is also found on sandy seabeds.

== Ecology ==
Aplysia morio feeds on algae. In Bermuda juveniles seem to feed almost exclusively on species of the red alga Laurencia, even though there is a wide range of algae to choose from. Adults widen their diet slightly to include Palmaria palmata. The animal either crawls over the seaweed or rears up to grasp the fronds with its radula and the odontophore (cartilage) that supports it. It may also swim, in a manner reminiscent of a manta ray, when looking for food.

An adult is a hermaphrodite that can act as a male and a female at the same time. As the penis of one individual is inserted into the genital opening of another, chains or clusters of mating sea hares can form. The initially spawning individual releases chemical signals that can trigger spawning in others, which may culminate in a mass spawning event. Fertilized eggs hatch and develop into veliger larvae, which drift with the plankton for at least a month and settle onto Laurencia seaweed.
