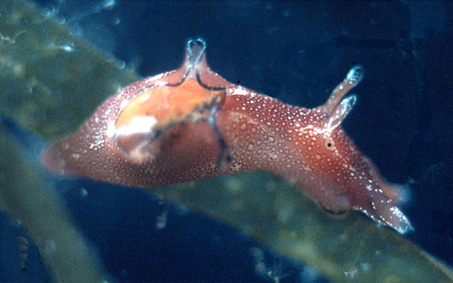
- In the Mediterranean Sea

Scientific classification
- Kingdom: Animalia
- Phylum: Mollusca
- Class: Gastropoda
- Order: Aplysiida
- Family: Aplysiidae
- Genus: Aplysia
- Species: A. punctata

Binomial name
- Aplysia punctata (Cuvier, 1803)

Synonyms
- List: Aplysia albopunctata Deshayes, 1853; Aplysia cuvieri Delle Chiaje, 1828; Aplysia dumortieri Cantraine, 1835; Aplysia ferussaci Rang, 1828; Aplysia griffithsiana Leach, 1852; Aplysia guttata Sars M., 1840; Aplysia hybrida Sowerby I, 1806; Aplysia longicornis Rang, 1828; Aplysia marginata Blainville, 1823; Aplysia mustelina Pennant, 1812; Aplysia nexa Thompson W., 1845; Aplysia nigromarginata Risso, 1818; Aplysia rosea Rathke, 1799; Aplysia stellata Risso, 1818; Aplysia unicolor Risso, 1818; Aplysia varians Leach, 1852; Aplysia virescens Risso, 1818; Laplysia punctata Cuvier, 1803

= Aplysia punctata =

Species of gastropod

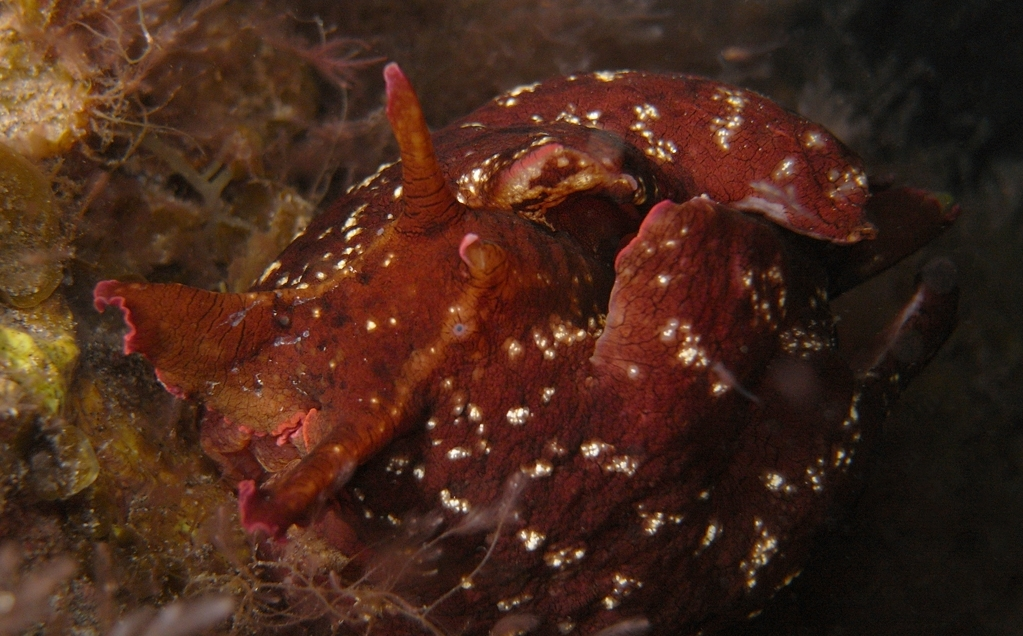
In the Canary Islands

The spotted sea hare (Aplysia punctata) is a species of sea slug in the family Aplysiidae, the sea hares.

It reaches a length of up to 20 cm (7.9 in) and is found in the northeast Atlantic, ranging from Greenland and Norway to the Mediterranean Sea.

== Life cycle ==
Spawning occurs in the springtime beginning in May as water temperature warms and continues until around October with species tending to only live for approximately one year. Aplysia punctata are simultaneous hermaphrodites with their individual sexual role being determined by either mass or egg-laying specialization. However, they do not self-fertilize and engage in mating behavior that can involve multiple individuals. During warmer months, behavior is dominated by reproduction and feeding, with little time spent crawling or remaining sedentary. Embryos develop from laid eggs and continue to a larval stage, becoming temporary members of the plankton. Larva rapidly transform into juveniles with sexual maturity typically occurring within three and four months from birth. A. punctata are benthic gastropods found in both littoral and sublittoral habitats with a large range spanning the northeast Atlantic and the Mediterranean sea. They are known to colonize both shallow, intertidal waters and also deeper zones within their range.

== Feeding ==
Aplysia punctata are grazing organisms which prefer to reside and feed on algal seaweed beds. Using their radula, A. punctata tear up seaweeds in order to consume them and are found to eat up to one-third of their body weight per day of algae. Individuals of A. punctata found in the intertidal area are recorded to be larger than those in deep waters due to a comparatively larger abundance of food. However, individuals with smaller diets are thought to have lower initial mortality rates and live longer than those with unlimited diets suggesting that caloric restriction is advantageous. Feeding and sexual reproduction both take place upon algal beds which provide a source of food and protection for A. punctata. Their coloration is usually determined from the pigments in the seaweed they feed upon which in turn also provides them with camouflage. Mediterranean species of A. punctata feed primarily on red algae of the genus Laurencia which provide them with metabolites known to produce antifungals, antivirals, and cytotoxins for self defense.

== Sensory organs ==
The rhinophores for Aplysia punctata are located both on their head and posterior tentacle. Their namesake as "sea hares" arises from the morphology of the rhinophores which look similar to rabbit ears. The rhinophore is the olfactory organ for the species and it is used to detect pheromones. Auditory and visual information is limited in A. punctata and so the function of the rhinophore is critical. This chemosensatory action assists in the localization of food and in sexual behavior. Amino acids are observed to be an olfactory stimulant to elicit feeding responses. Serotonergic fibers are also found in the rhinophore nerves which are believed to have a physiological role in olfactory responses to amino acid presence. The glomeruli and the ganglion are segments of the rhinophore which represent different processing stages of sensory information; the processing of odor information takes place in the ganglion.

Aplysia punctata also have large neurons which make them a model species in the study of the cellular basis of learning and memory. They are known to be among the largest in nature which assists in studies that attempt to explain how neural circuits control behavior. Their increased size is attributed to being polyploid somatic cells. It is observed to be an advantageous adaptation that allows for enhanced speed of electrical signals resulting in faster behavioral response times. The central nervous system and neurons are located on the ganglionic surface and possess unique coloration depending on location.

== Shell calcification ==
Aplysia punctata's shell is located internally to protect their heart and other organs from environmental conditions like wave action. However, it is comparatively thinner and smaller than ones possessed by other gastropods. Their shell is observed to measure up to 6 cm in larger specimens. Accretionary growth bands may be observed on larger specimens, akin to those seen on the shells of bivalves and other mollusks. The main element composing A. punctata's shell is aragonite that is deposited within a protein matrix. Aragonite is a form of calcium carbonate which notably is susceptible to dissolution in lower sea water pH.

As a species of mollusk, Aplysia punctata performs marine calcification in building and maintaining their shell material. This species of sea hare is unique for its shell resilience in acidified ocean environments. Most marine species with shells (mollusks, echinoderms, corals, coccolithophores, foraminiferans, calcifying algae, etc.) experience increased dissolution and increasing energetic costs of maintaining and growing these structures in this basic environment. However, living in the middle to lower intertidal zone and shallow waters, A. punctata naturally faces fluctuations in pH and has been observed to have no decrease in calcification of new shell material when exposed to acidic environments similar to those of having increased dissolved carbon dioxide. Although, they do undergo increased metabolic rate in low pH environments which is attributed to the maintenance of calcium carbonate and aragonite structures in waters depleted of these materials.
