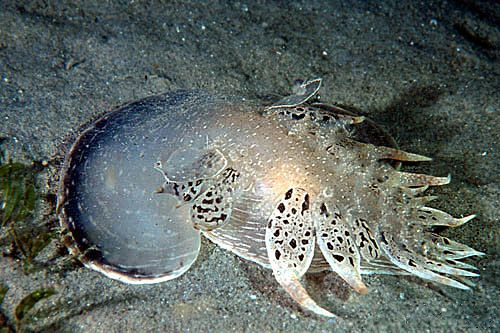
- Tethys fimbria on the sand bottom with a broad oral hood on the left (the head end) and a body with two rows of spotted cerata
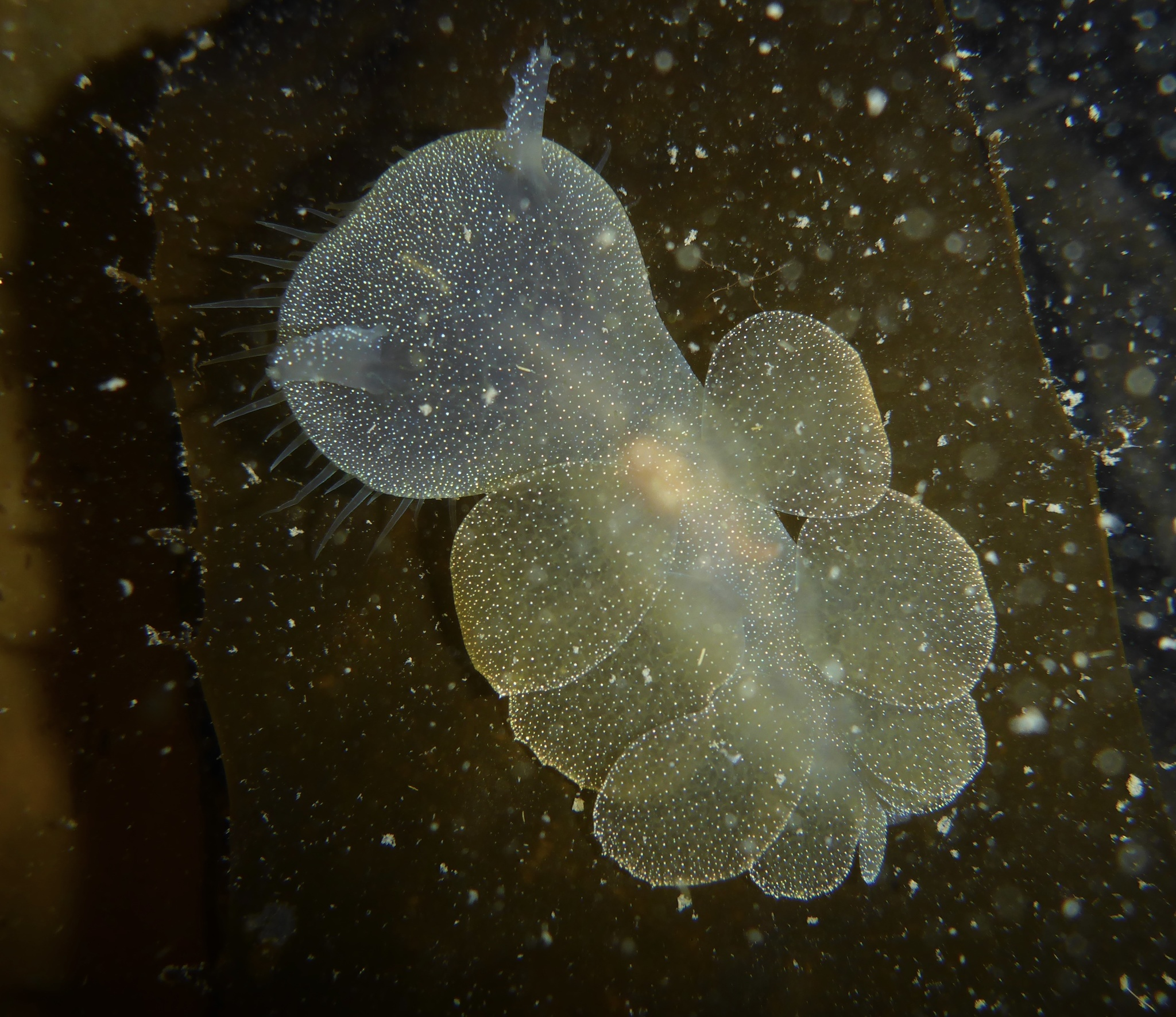
- Melibe leonina

Scientific classification
- Kingdom: Animalia
- Phylum: Mollusca
- Class: Gastropoda
- Order: Nudibranchia
- Suborder: Dendronotacea
- Superfamily: Dendronotoidea
- Family: Tethydidae; Rafinesque, 1815

Type genus
- Tethys Linnaeus, 1767

Diversity
- 2 genera 20 valid species and 3 uncertain species

Synonyms
- Fimbriidae O'Donoghue, 1926 (Note: Invalid name, as the type genus is a junior homonym); Melibidae Forbes, 1844; Tethymelibidae Bergh, 1890 (Note: Name not available, as it is not based on a genus)

= Tethydidae =

Family of gastropods

Tethydidae is a family of nudibranchs, shell-less marine gastropod molluscs or sea slugs, in the superfamily Dendronotoidea.

== Description ==
Species in this family do not possess a radula.

== Genera ==
Two genera are recognized within the family Tethydidae:

- Melibe Rang, 1829
- Tethys Linnaeus, 1767

== Nomenclature ==
The group was originally established as Tethydia, as a subfamily. In 1981, the Official List by Opinion 1182 of ICZN (1981: 174) ruled the corrected name of the group is Tethydidae and not the incorrect spelling Tethyidae.
