= Akera silbo =

Scientific classification
- Kingdom: Animalia
- Phylum: Mollusca
- Class: Gastropoda
- Order: Aplysiida
- Superfamily: Akeroidea
- Family: Akeridae
- Genus: Akera
- Species: A. silbo

Binomial name
- Akera silbo Ortea & Moro, 2009

Species of gastropod

Akera silbo is a species of sea snail (or sea slug), a marine opisthobranch gastropod mollusk in the family Akeridae, a family that is related to the sea hares.

== Distribution ==
This marine species occurs in the Atlantic Ocean off the Canary Islands.
