= Akera bayeri =

Scientific classification
- Kingdom: Animalia
- Phylum: Mollusca
- Class: Gastropoda
- Order: Aplysiida
- Superfamily: Akeroidea
- Family: Akeridae
- Genus: Akera
- Species: A. bayeri

Binomial name
- Akera bayeri Ev. Marcus & Er. Marcus, 1967
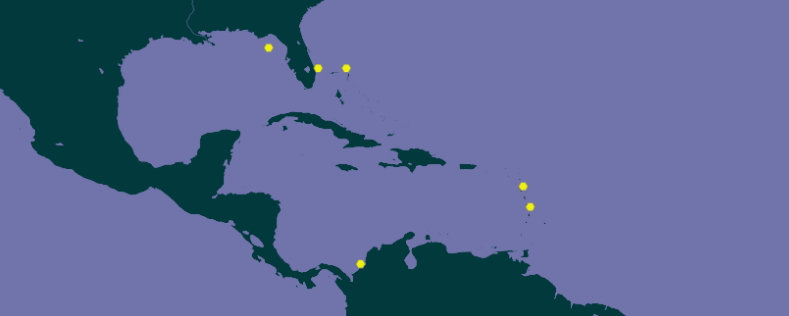

Synonyms
- Akera thompsoni Olsson & T. L. McGinty, 1951 unavailable name (no description)

Species of gastropod

Akera bayeri is a species of sea snail (or sea slug), a marine opisthobranch gastropod mollusk in the family Akeridae, a family that is related to the sea hares.

== Distribution ==
This species occurs in the Gulf of Mexico off Florida and the Caribbean Sea off Colombia, Martinique and Guadeloupe; in the Atlantic Ocean off the Bahamas.
