= Akera julieae =

Scientific classification
- Kingdom: Animalia
- Phylum: Mollusca
- Class: Gastropoda
- Order: Aplysiida
- Superfamily: Akeroidea
- Family: Akeridae
- Genus: Akera
- Species: A. julieae

Binomial name
- Akera julieae Á. Valdés & Barwick, 2005

Species of gastropod

Akera julieae is a species of sea snail (or sea slug), a marine opisthobranch gastropod mollusk in the family Akeridae, a family that is related to the sea hares.

== Description ==
The body of the holotype is 10 mm long.

== Distribution ==
This marine species occurs off California, USA and Costa Rica.
