= Akera spirata =

Akera spirata Temporal range: Paleocene

Scientific classification
- Domain: Eukaryota
- Kingdom: Animalia
- Phylum: Mollusca
- Class: Gastropoda
- Order: Aplysiida
- Superfamily: Akeroidea
- Family: Akeridae
- Genus: Akera
- Species: †A. spirata

Binomial name
- †Akera spirata Staadt, 1913

Synonyms
- † Acera spirata Staadt, 1913 superseded combination

Species of gastropod

Akera spirata is an extinct species of sea snail (or sea slug), a marine opisthobranch gastropod mollusk in the family Akeridae, a family that is related to the sea hares.

== Distribution ==
Fossils of this extinct species were found in Paleocene strata in Champagne-Ardenne, France.
