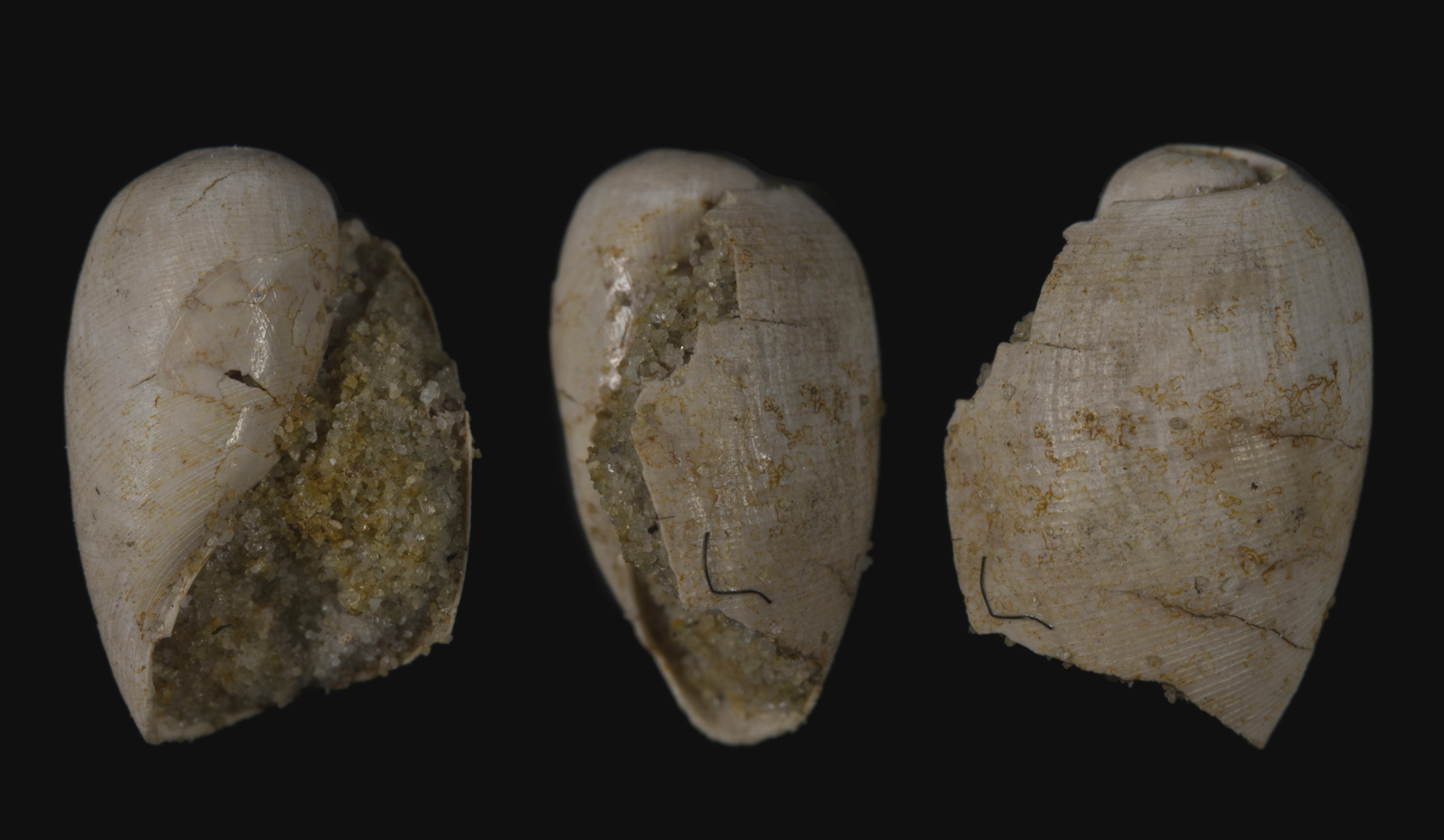
- Shell of † Akera striatella (specimen at MNHN, Paris)

Scientific classification
- Domain: Eukaryota
- Kingdom: Animalia
- Phylum: Mollusca
- Class: Gastropoda
- Order: Aplysiida
- Superfamily: Akeroidea
- Family: Akeridae
- Genus: Akera
- Species: †A. striatella

Binomial name
- †Akera striatella (Lamarck, 1804)

Synonyms
- † Bulla striatella Lamarck, 1804 superseded combination

= Akera striatella =

Akera striatella Temporal range: Eocene

Species of gastropod

Akera striatella is an extinct species of sea snail (or sea slug), a marine opisthobranch gastropod mollusk in the family Akeridae, a family that is related to the sea hares.

== Distribution ==
Fossils of this extinct species were found in Eocene strata in Île-de-France and the Aquitaine Basin, France.
