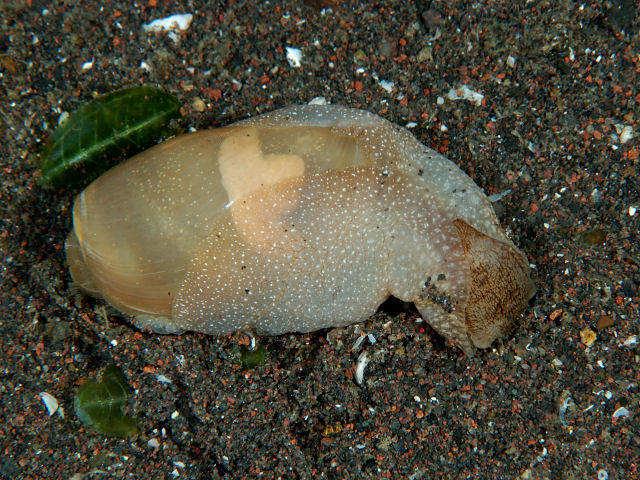
- Akera soluta

Scientific classification
- Domain: Eukaryota
- Kingdom: Animalia
- Phylum: Mollusca
- Class: Gastropoda
- Order: Aplysiida
- Superfamily: Akeroidea
- Family: Akeridae
- Genus: Akera
- Species: A. soluta

Binomial name
- Akera soluta (Gmelin, 1791)
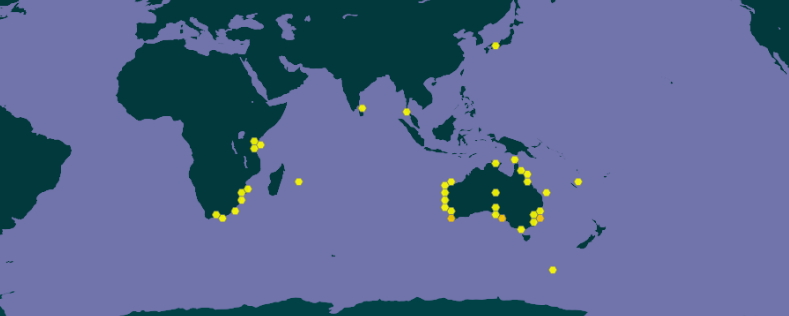

Synonyms
- Bulla (Akera) tenuis A. Adams, 1850; Bulla (Akera) tumida A. Adams, 1850 superseded combination; Bulla ceylanica Bruguière, 1792 junior subjective synonym; Bulla soluta Gmelin, 1791 (original combination); Bulla tenuis A. Adams, 1850 junior subjective synonym; Bulla tumida A. Adams, 1850 superseded combination

= Akera soluta =

Species of gastropod

Akera soluta is a species of sea snail (or sea slug), a marine opisthobranch gastropod mollusk in the family Akeridae, a family that is related to the sea hares.

== Description ==
The length of the shell attains 40.6 mm.

(Described as Bulla (Akera) tenuis) The shell is subcylindrical and slender, with an extended anterior. It has a horny, diaphanous appearance and features longitudinal striations. The spire is relatively elevated.

== Distribution ==
This marine species occurs in the tropical and temperate Indo-Pacific; also off Australia (New South Wales, Queensland, Victoria, Western Australia).
