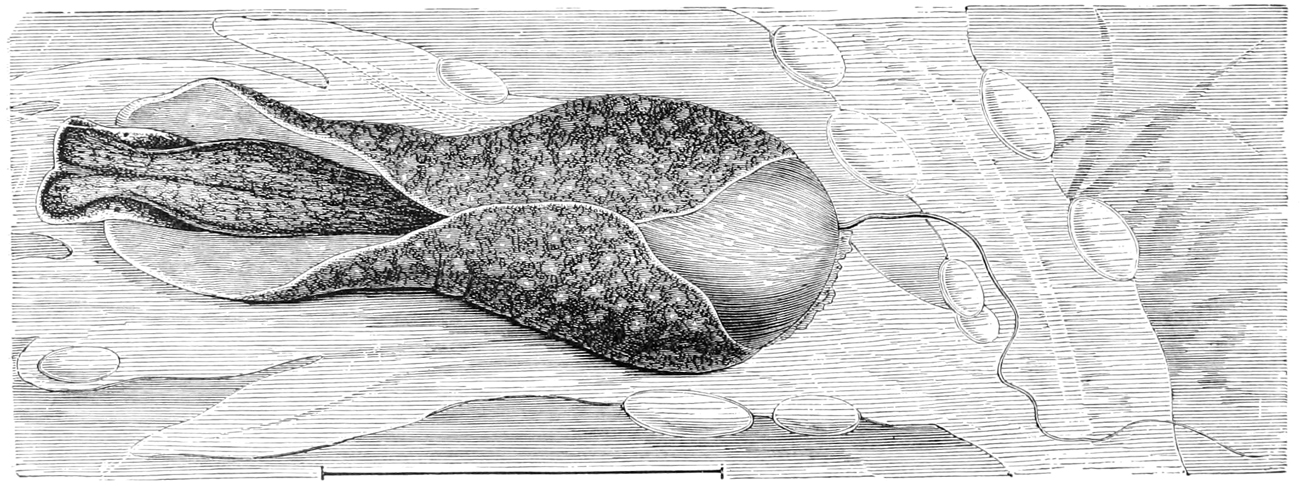
- drawing of Akera bullata
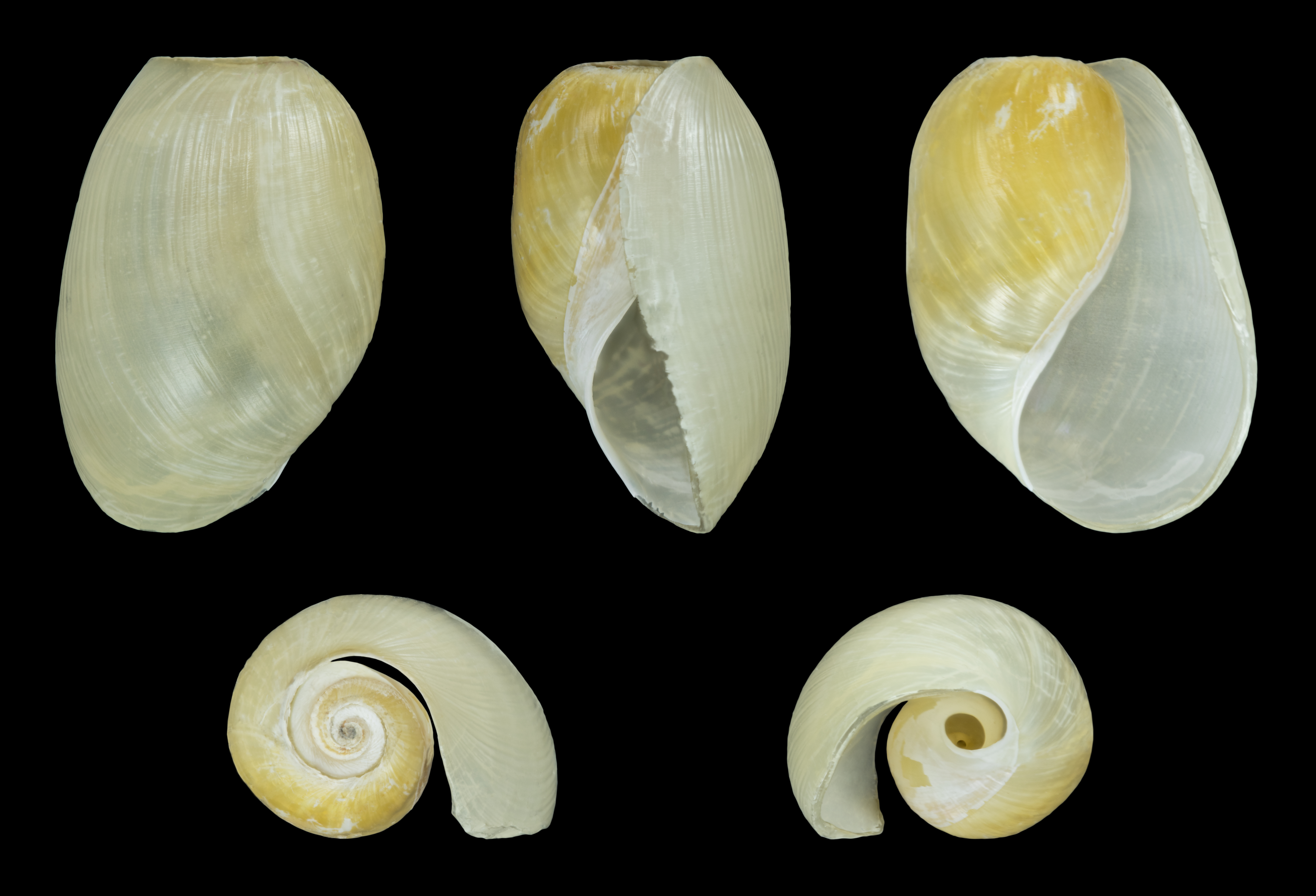
- Shell of Akera bullata

Scientific classification
- Domain: Eukaryota
- Kingdom: Animalia
- Phylum: Mollusca
- Class: Gastropoda
- Order: Aplysiida
- Superfamily: Akeroidea
- Family: Akeridae
- Genus: Akera
- Species: A. bullata

Binomial name
- Akera bullata O. F. Müller, 1776

Synonyms
- Possibly Aaera bullata; Acera bullata (Müller O.F., 1776); Acera elegans Locard, 1886; Aceras elegans Locard, 1886; Akera flexilis Brown, 1844; Bulla akera Gmelin, 1791; Bulla elastica Danilo & Sandri, 1856; Bulla farrani Norman, 1890; Bulla fragilis Lamarck, 1822; Bulla hanleyi Adams A. in Sowerby G.B. II, 1850; Bulla norwegica Bruguière, 1792; Bulla resiliens Donovan, 1801; Eucampe donovani Leach, 1847 (substitute name for Bulla akera)

= Akera bullata =

Species of gastropod

Akera bullata, named the royal flush sea slug, is a species of sea snail (or sea slug), a marine opisthobranch gastropod mollusk in the family Akeridae, a family that is related to the sea hares. This species is the only European representative of the genus Akera.

== Distribution ==
This species occurs from Norway to the Canaries, and also in the Mediterranean.

== Ecology ==
This is a herbivorous bottom dweller (up to 370 m deep), which feeds on seagrasses in the genera Zostera and Posidonia.

== Description ==
The body of this sea hare can reach a maximum length of about 6 cm. Its coloration varies from gray to orange, often with white or dark specks. The shell is fragile, smooth, and can be either white or brown. This sea hare is not an agile swimmer. When disturbed, it uses its broad parapodia — fleshy protrusions held together in a funnel shape above the head — to paddle away.

== Synonyms ==
Acera bullata is an orthographic variant with considerable currency.

The NLBIF lists a large number of synonyms in addition to the above; including: Bulla akera (Gmelin, J.F., 1791), Bulla norwegica (Bruguière, J.G., 1789), Bulla canaliculata (Olivi, 1792), Bulla resiliens (Donovan, E., 1801), Bulla fragilis (Lamarck, J.B.P.A. de, 1822), Akera flexilis (Brown, 1844), Bulla hanleyi (Adams A. in Sowerby G.B. II, 1850/1855), Eucampe donovani (Leach, W.E., 1852), Bulla elastica (Sandri & Danilo, 1856), Acera bullata var. nana (Jeffreys, 1867), Acera elegans (Locard, 1886), Bulla farrani (Norman, 1890), Bulla globosa (Cantraine, F.J., 1840), Akera tenuis (Brusina, S., 1866) and Akera farrani (Winckworth, R., 1932).
