= Phagomimicry =

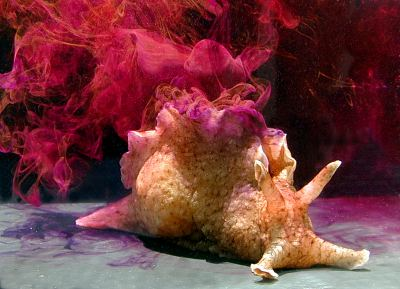
Aplysia californica displaying phagomimicry in response to predator threat.

Phagomimicry is a defensive behaviour of sea hares, in which the animal ejects a mixture of chemicals, which mimic food, and overwhelm the senses of their predator, giving the sea hare a chance to escape. The typical defence response of the sea hare to a predator is to release two chemicals - ink from the ink gland and opaline from the opaline gland. While ink creates a dark, diffuse cloud in the water which disrupts the sensory perception of the predator by acting as a smokescreen and as a decoy, the opaline, which affects the senses dealing with feeding, causes the predator to instinctively attack the cloud of chemicals as if it were indeed food. This ink is able to mimic food by having a high concentration of amino acids and other compounds that are normally found in food, and the attack behaviour of the predator allows the sea-hares the opportunity to escape.

== Inking behaviour ==
The inking behaviour exhibited in phagomimicry is in response to predator threat. Sea hares have many natural predators such as starfish, lobsters, and other crustaceans. When threatened by a predator, phagomimicry behaviour begins. An ink solution is released from both the opaline and ink glands individually, then the compounds mix in the mantle of the sea hare to form the ink mixture. When ink is released it creates a smoke-screen like defense mechanism allowing the sea hares time to escape while also affecting the olfactory and gustatory senses of their predator. Predators are tricked into thinking that they have captured their prey due to the specific chemical composition of the ink released. This induces feeding behaviours in the predator, and again gives the sea hares a better chance of escaping predation.

=== Opaline gland ===
The opaline gland is a structure resembling a bundle of grapes attached to a central canal which is composed of epithelial cells. Synthesis of the opaline substance happens in the opaline vesicles themselves, as there are only opaline vesicles and muscle cells in the opaline gland. The gland is innervated by three separate motor neurons, and is composed of single large cells and vesicle cells, all of which have enlarged nucleus. These cells are inclosed in an external layer of muscle. When a sensory neuron detects a predator threat, dopamine is released onto one of the three motor neurons. The dopamine release causes a gland contraction, which then causes the expulsion of the opaline substance.

=== Ink gland ===
The ink gland is smaller in size than the opaline gland, and is composed of two cell types: rough endoplasmic recticlum (RER) and granulate cells. The cells are surrounded by a layer of muscle, to contraction and expelling their contents. The RER is the formation site of the anti-predator protein, the granulate cells are for extra pigment storage. Pigment is dependent on the amount of red algae available to the sea hares, the higher the red algal consumption, the darker the colour of their ink. This mixing can cause another chain of reactions between the compounds that have further implications on the effect that the ink secretion has on predators.

== Ink chemical composition ==
Both the opaline and ink gland secrete different substances that when mixed together form the ink released during phagomimicry. The secretion is very acidic (ink having a pH of 4.9 and opaline having a pH of 5.8) and contains high levels of bioactive molecules that can serve as feeding stimulants, feeding deterrents, and aversive compounds. Feeding stimulants can be found in both the ink and opaline secretions in the form of amino acids (such as lysine and arginine), and serve to trick predators into thinking that the ink secretion is a food source. To induce the aversive feeding effects on predators the ink contains a compound from the opaline gland produced from the oxidation of L-lysine, which is then mixed in the mantle with the L-amino acid oxidase from the ink gland. Together this compound, called escapin is secreted in the ink, and is a feeding deterrent. The ink secretion can have a long-lasting effect on predators as chemical phagomimics can cause chemo-mechanosensory stimulation which overwhelms the sensory system and leads to confusion and eventually the cessation of the attack.

== Physical properties of Ink ==
The ink released from the ink gland is dark purple in colour, the colour depends on the type of algae consumed by the sea-hare. The opaline ink is white in colour, and when it mixes with the ink gland ink they form a compound that suspends itself in the water (polidisperse suspension), creating a smoke-screen defence mechanism. The particle density of the ink is similar to that of species such as cuttlefish, the particles range in size from 80–150 nm, with a density of 1.27 cm-3, which allows for the inks suspension in water .

== See also ==
- Cuttlefish
- Cephalopod ink
