= Michael Lewis (psychologist) =

American psychologist (born 1937)

Michael Lewis (born January 10, 1937, in Brooklyn, New York) is University Distinguished Professor of Pediatrics and Psychiatry, and director of the Institute for the Study of Child Development at Rutgers Robert Wood Johnson Medical School. He is also professor of psychology, education, and biomedical engineering and serves on the Executive Committee of the Cognitive Science Center at Rutgers. He is also founding director of the Rutgers Robert Wood Johnson Medical School Autism Center. He received his PhD in 1962 from the University of Pennsylvania in both clinical and experimental psychology.

== Research ==
His research has focused on typical emotional and intellectual development. By focusing on the normal course of development, he has been able to articulate the sequence of developmental capacities of the child in regard to its intellectual growth and relate this to changes in the organization of its central nervous system functioning. His discoveries of techniques to measure CNS functioning, through the use of the habituation-dishabituation paradigm, are widely used throughout the country and have become the standard measurement system used to predict atypical growth as well as typical development. Using these measurement instruments, he has been able to develop computer-based techniques for enhancing intellectual ability in children suffering from a variety of disorders associated with developmental delays. These include children with Down syndrome, preterm infants, and children with cerebral palsy.

== Honors ==
Among his honors, Lewis is a fellow of the New York Academy of Sciences, American Psychological Association, and American Association of the Advancement of Science, as well as the Japan Society for the Promotion of Science. In 1995 he was ranked by a University of Notre Dame Study as number 1 in terms of the impact of scientists who are most referenced and productive in the field of developmental sciences, in the top 1.5% of scientists referenced in the Social Science Index. In addition, Dr. Lewis received the 2009 Urie Bronfenbrenner Award for Lifetime Contribution to Developmental Psychology in the Service of Science and Society from the American Psychological Association, as well as the 2012 Hedi Levenback Pioneer Award from The New York Zero-to-Three for his pioneering research in child development. The Society of Research in Child Development, the leading academic child development organization, announced the 2013 award for the Distinguished Scientific Contributions to Child Development, in recognition of Lewis's lifetime contribution to the scientific body of knowledge and understanding of children's development.

== Publications ==
=== Books and monographs ===
- Lewis, M., Goldberg, S., & Campbell, H. (1969). A developmental study of information processing within the first three years of life: Response decrement to a redundant signal. Monographs of the Society for Research in Child Development, 34(9, Serial No. 133).
- Weinraub, M., & Lewis, M. (1977). The determinants of children's responses to separation. Monographs of the Society for Research in Child Development, 42 (4, Serial No. 172).
- Lewis, M. & Brooks-Gunn, J. (1979). Social cognition and the acquisition of self. New York: Plenum.
- Lewis, M., & Michalson, L. (1983). Children's emotions and moods: Developmental theory and measurement. New York: Plenum.
- Lewis, M., & Miller, S. (Eds.).(1990). Handbook of developmental psychopathology. New York: Plenum.
- Weistuch, L., & Lewis, M. (1991). Language Interaction Intervention Program. Tucson, AZ: Communication Skill Builders.
- Lewis, M. (1992). Shame, The exposed self. New York: The Free Press.
- Lewis, M., & Haviland, J. (Eds.). (1993). Handbook of emotions. New York: Guilford Press. (Recipient of Choice Magazine’s 1995 Outstanding Academic Book Award).
- Lewis, M., & Saarni, C. (Eds.). (1993). Lying and deception in everyday life. New York: Guilford Press.
- Lewis, M., & Bendersky, M. (Eds.). (1995). Mothers, babies, and cocaine: The role of toxins in development. Mahwah, NJ: Lawrence Erlbaum Associates, Inc.
- Lewis, M., & Sullivan, M. W. (Eds.).(1996). Emotional development in atypical children. Mahwah, NJ: Lawrence Erlbaum Associates, Inc.
- Lewis, M. (1997). Altering fate: Why the past does not predict the future. New York: Guilford Press.
- Lewis, M., & Haviland-Jones, J. (Eds.). (2000). Handbook of emotions, 2nd edition. New York: Guilford Press.
- Sameroff, A., Lewis, M., & Miller, S. (Eds.). (2000). Handbook of developmental psychopathology, 2nd edition. New York: Plenum.
- Slater, A., & Lewis, M. (Eds.). (2002). Introduction to infant development. Oxford, England: Oxford University Press.
- Slater, A., & Lewis, M. (Eds.).(2007). Introduction to infant development, 2nd edition. Oxford, England: Oxford University Press.
- Lewis, M., Haviland-Jones, J., & Barrett, L. (2008). Handbook of Emotions, 3rd edition. New York: Guilford Press.
- Slater, A, Lewis, M, Anzures, G, & Lee, K. (Eds.).(2011). Introduction to infant development, Canadian edition. Canada: Oxford University Press.
- Lewis, M., & Kestler, L. (Eds.). (2012). Gender Differences in Prenatal Substance Exposure. Washington DC: APA Books.
- Mayes, L., & Lewis, M. (Eds.) (2012). The Cambridge handbook of environment in human development: A handbook of theory and measurement. England. Cambridge University Press.
- Lewis, M. (2014). The Rise of Consciousness and the Development of Emotional Life. New York: Guilford Press.
- Lewis, M. & Rudolph, K. (Eds.) (2014). Handbook of Developmental Psychopathology, 3rd Ed. New York. Springer.
