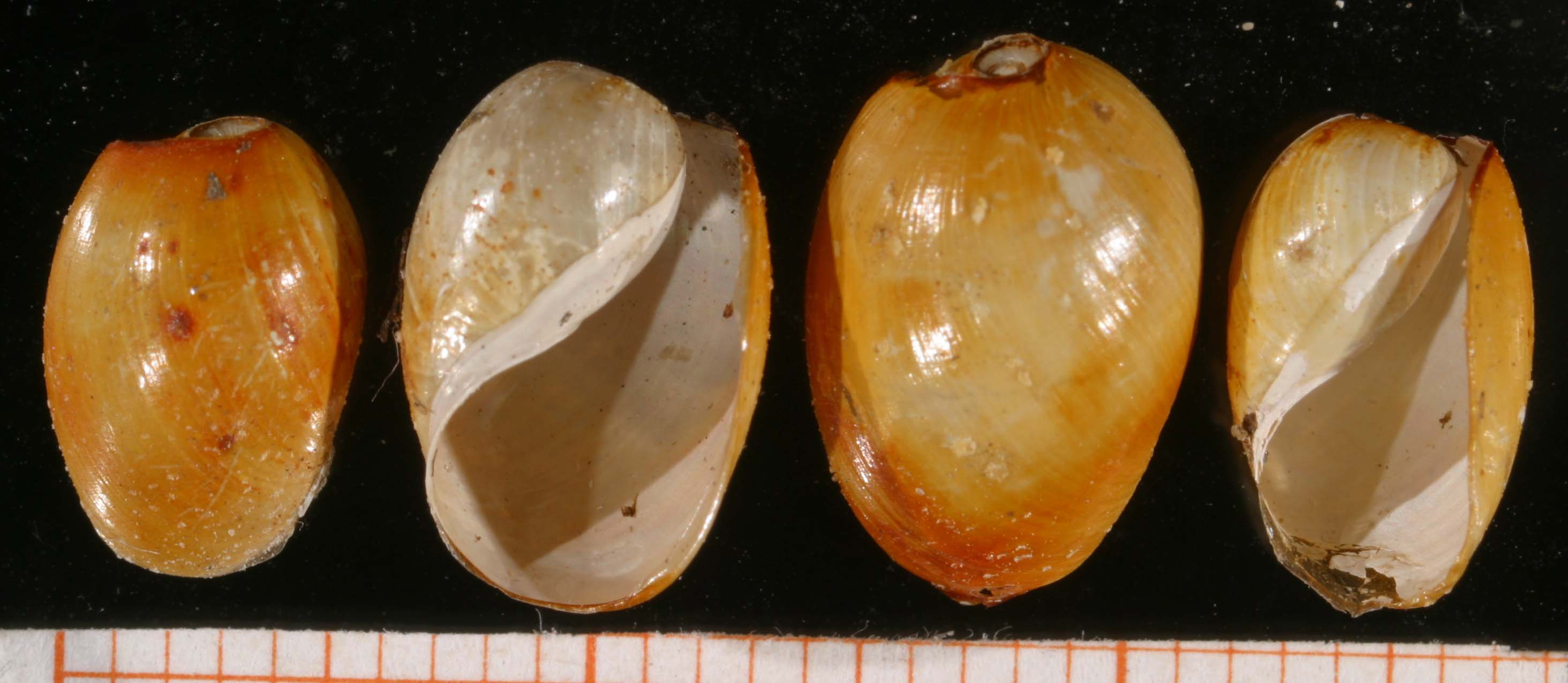
- shells of Akera bullata

Scientific classification
- Kingdom: Animalia
- Phylum: Mollusca
- Class: Gastropoda
- Order: Aplysiida
- Family: Akeridae
- Genus: Akera; O. F. Müller, 1776

Species
- See text
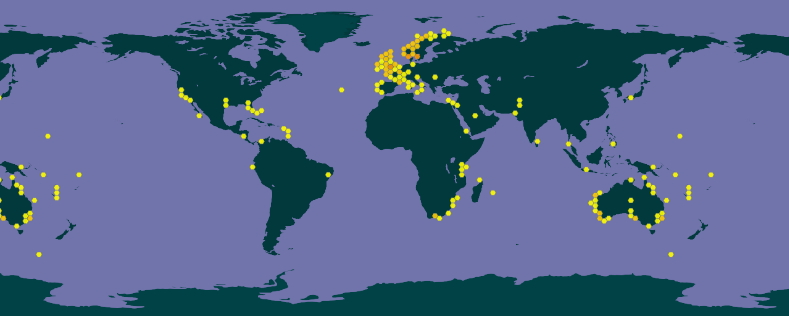

Synonyms
- Acera Jeffreys, 1867 (unjustified emendation of Akera Müller, 1776); Aceras Locard, 1886 (unjustified emendation of Akera); Bulla (Akera) O. F. Müller, 1776; Eucampe Leach, 1847; Vitrella Swainson, 1840

= Akera =

Akera Temporal range: Callovian–recent

Genus of gastropods

Akera is a marine genus of sea hare in the family Akeridae, known from the late Callovian (Jurassic) to the recent periods.

Akera is the sole genus within the family Akeridae.

== Description ==
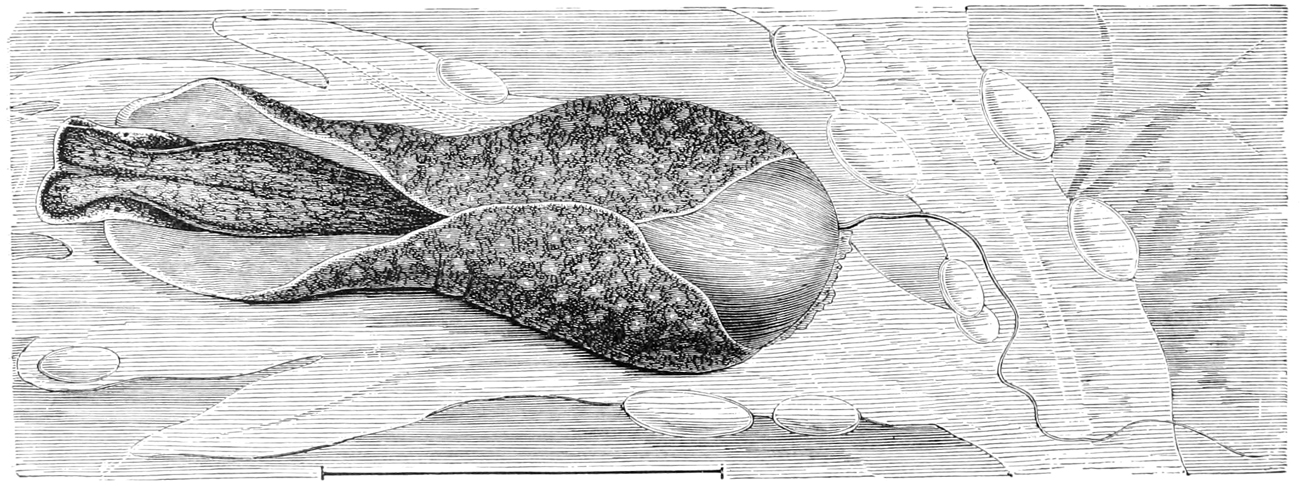
Akera bullata

Akera is a primitive genus. Their soft and elongated body does not fit completely in their external shell; it just covers their visceral hump which is positioned at the posterior end of their bodies. Their streamlined bodies are adapted for burrowing.

The shell is large and glossy, globosely cylindrical with a paper-thin, translucent, and flexible texture that provides minimal protection. The spire is truncated, and the whorls are deeply channeled. The protoconch is partially embedded. The upper whorls are blunt. The aperture spans the length of the body whorl or is slightly shorter. It is expanded and deeply sinuated in front, with the outer margin disunited at the suture. The columella is exposed, revealing the inner whorls. The color of the shell is muted, ranging from pale brown to greenish hues.

The head-disc is greatly elongated, wide, and bifid anteriorly, tapering towards the rear. The mantle's hind edge is fimbriated and extends through the fissured shell suture. The foot is expanded and narrow with a rounded anterior end, becoming broad and truncated posteriorly. Using its extended lateral parapodia, the animal swims with considerable agility.

== Distribution ==
Species of this marine genus have a global distribution including temperate and tropical seas, inhabiting soft muddy bottoms, sea grass beds and coral sand. They are herbivorous, feeding on algae and detritus.

== Species ==
- Akera bayeri (Marcus & Marcus, 1967) - It can be found along the coast of Colombia and Brazil.
- Akera bullata (O. F. Müller, 1776) - type species
- Akera constricta Kuroda, 1947
- Akera julieae Valdes & Barwick, 2005
- Akera silbo Ortea & Moro, 2009
- Akera soluta (Gmelin, 1791) - Also called the Solute akera, this species can be found in the Indo-West Pacific. Little is known about this species. Its shell can grow as large as 45 mm in length.
- † Akera spirata Staadt, 1913
- † Akera striatella Lamarck, 1804 - fossil from the Eocene and Oligocene.

Synonyms

- Akera aperta Hedley, 1899: synonym of Oxynoe aperta (Hedley, 1899) (original combination)
- † Akera eliai Shalem, 1928 : synonym of † Hamlinia eliai (Shalem, 1928) (original combination)
- Akera flexilis T. Brown, 1844: synonym of Akera bullata O. F. Müller, 1776
- Akera tasmanica Beddome, 1883 synonym of Diaphana tasmanica (Beddome, 1883)
- Akera thompsoni Olsson & T. L. McGinty, 1951: synonym of Akera bayeri Ev. Marcus & Er. Marcus, 1967 (unavailable name, no description)
