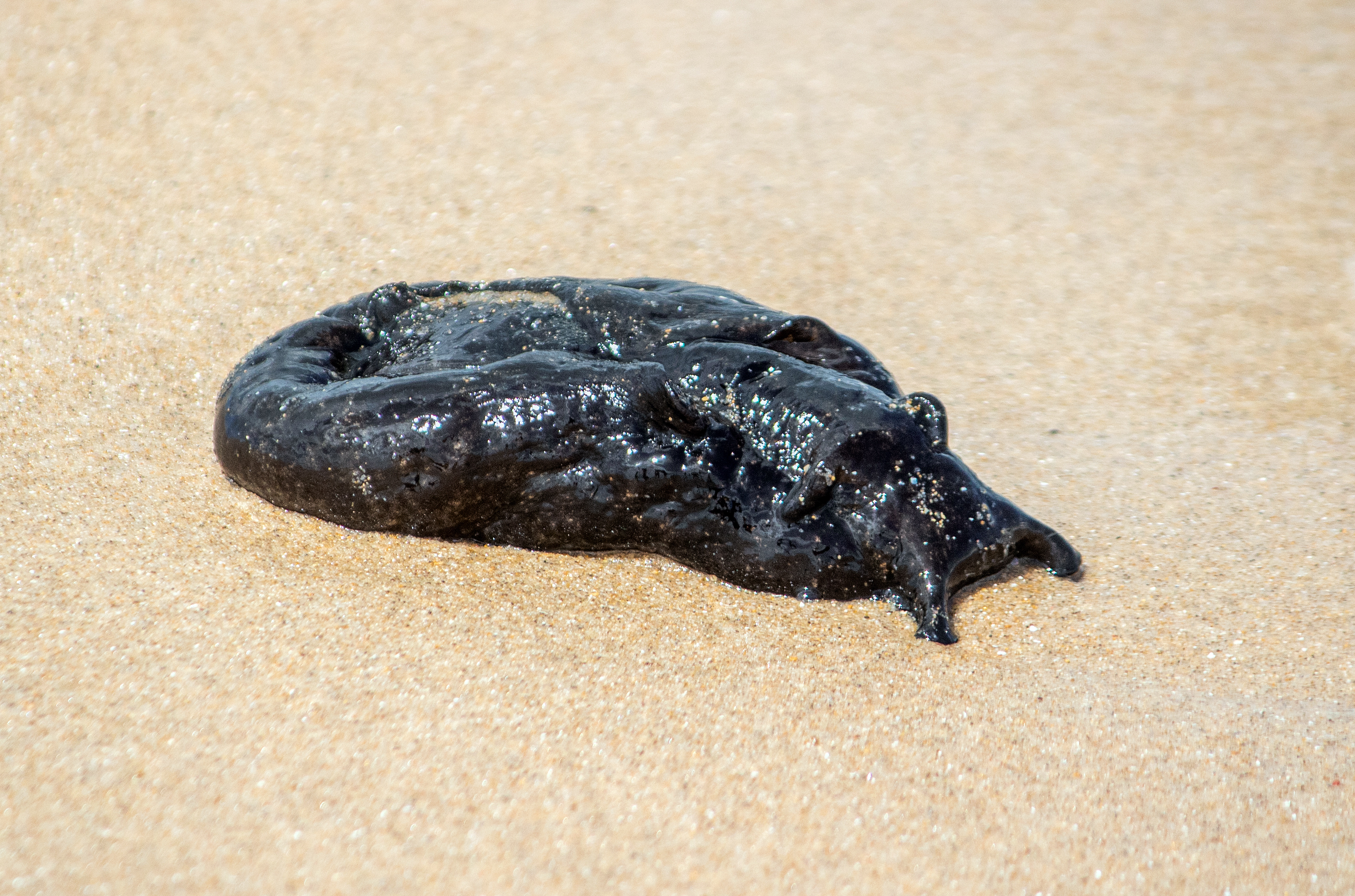

Scientific classification
- Kingdom: Animalia
- Phylum: Mollusca
- Class: Gastropoda
- Order: Aplysiida
- Family: Aplysiidae
- Genus: Aplysia
- Species: A. vaccaria

Binomial name
- Aplysia vaccaria Winkler, 1955

= Aplysia vaccaria =

Species of gastropod

Aplysia vaccaria, also known as the black sea hare and California black sea hare, is a species of extremely large sea slug, a marine, opisthobranch, gastropod mollusk in the family Aplysiidae.

It is the largest sea slug species.

== Distribution ==
This sea hare species lives in the northeast Pacific Ocean off California, United States, and Baja California, Mexico, including the Gulf of California.

== Description ==
The black sea hare can grow to be very large; the longest recorded specimen measured 99 cm (39 in) when crawling (thus fully extended), and weighed nearly 14 kg (31 lb).

Unlike Aplysia californica, the body of this species is relatively firm, and the parapodia are joined behind the siphon.

Unlike many other members of the same family and genus, this species is incapable of producing ink.

== Feeding habits ==
All Aplysia species are herbivorous. This species eats brown seaweeds and kelp, which give the animal its typically very dark coloration.

== Lifecycle and behavior ==
Aplysia vaccaria has a lifecycle of one year. They grow very quickly, at an average rate of 4.9 g/day. This high rate of growth allows A. vaccaria to become the largest known species of sea slug. It is a herbivore that feeds on brown algae, but its close relative A. californica feeds almost exclusively on red algae. This difference in food sources likely minimizes competition between the two species, which share much of the same habitat. A. vaccaria is found in the intertidal and upper-subtidal zone, meaning that it can survive exposure to air while the tide is out. It is rarely preyed upon by other organisms, which has made it the subject of various experiments testing for a secreted biotoxin that discourages predation. The large size of A. vaccaria also contributes to its lack of predators. It is simply too big for many predators to attack or consume.

== Mating habits ==
Aplysia vaccaria is a simultaneous hermaphrodite; it has both male and female sex organs that are able to contribute to sexual reproduction at the same time, which is distinct from nonsimultaneous (or sequential) hermaphrodites, which only have one sex organ present or functional at any one time. Being simultaneously hermaphroditic is advantageous because any two individuals are able to reproduce with one another, which facilitates them finding mates. Despite having both sex organs functional during reproduction, only one Aplysia vaccaria acts as a sperm donor during the mating encounter, which is determined by the relative sizes of the two individuals. The smaller individual most often acts as the sperm donor, while the larger individual acts as the sperm recipient. Because the reproductive role of A. vaccaria is dependent on the relative sizes between a mating pair, one individual can act as both a sperm donor and a sperm recipient during a mating season. Larger individuals are suggested to be preferentially selected for mating, and they act as the sperm recipient to avoid the competition present between smaller individuals to be sperm donors. This mechanism of size-assortative mating is common among gastropods.

== Production of defense substances ==
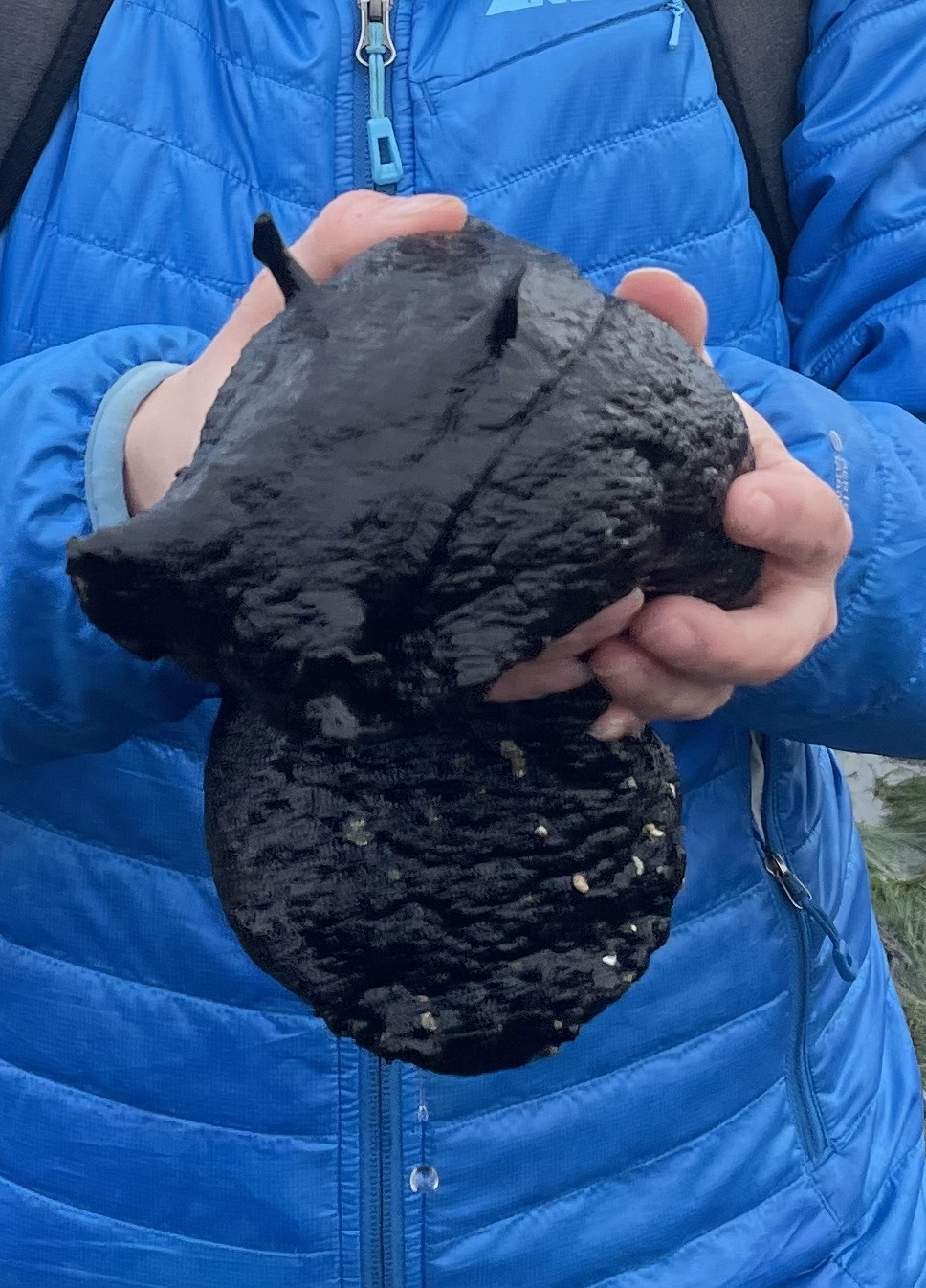
Aplysia vaccaria can be safely handled by humans

The scarcity of natural predators for sea hares has long suggested to scientists that some kind of toxin must be produced to discourage predation. Unlike most members of its family, A. vaccaria is incapable of producing ink. The absence of this defense mechanism while maintaining a very low level of predation further suggests that it is protected by a secreted toxin effective enough that the production of ink for defense purposes was no longer evolutionarily beneficial. Sea hares form their toxins from compounds they receive from their foods. This is significant because the type of algae the sea hare eats determines the toxins it produces. A. vaccaria primarily feeds on brown algae, so its toxins are derived from this source and are distinct from sea hares such as A. californica, which feeds on red algae. Food sources also determine the color of the sea hare, which explains why A. vaccaria appears black or dark brown while A. californica appears red. To discourage predation by fish, brown algae produce the toxin acetoxycrenulide. During digestion, A. vaccaria extracts this compound and allows it to accumulate in its tissue. Because acetoxycrenulide is highly toxic to fish, its presence in this slug is sufficient to discourage predation.
