= Aplysia gill and siphon withdrawal reflex =

Involuntary defensive reflex

The Aplysia gill and siphon withdrawal reflex (GSWR) is an involuntary, defensive reflex of the sea hare Aplysia californica, a large shell-less sea snail or sea slug. This reflex causes the sea hare's delicate siphon and gill to be retracted when the animal is disturbed. Aplysia californica is used in neuroscience research for studies of the cellular basis of behavior including: habituation, dishabituation, and sensitization, because of the simplicity and relatively large size of the underlying neural circuitry.

Eric Kandel, recipient of the Nobel Prize in Physiology or Medicine in 2000 for his work with Aplysia californica, was involved in pioneering research into this reflex in the 1960s and 1970s.

== Nonassociative learning ==
Nonassociative learning is a change of the behavior of an animal due to an experience from specific kinds of stimuli. In contrast to associative learning the behavioral change is not caused by the animals learning that a particular temporal association occurs between the stimuli. There are three different forms of nonassociative learning examined in Aplysia: habituation, dishabituation and sensitization. Eric Kandel and colleagues were the first to demonstrate that Aplysia californica is capable of displaying both habituation and dishabituation.

Habituation in Aplysia californica occurs when a stimulus is repeatedly presented to an animal and there is a progressive decrease in response to that particular stimulus.

Dishabituation in Aplysia californica occurs when the animal is presented with another novel stimulus and a partial or complete restoration of a habituated response occurs.

Sensitization in Aplysia californica is the increase of a response due to the presentation of a novel, often noxious, stimulus.

== Gill and siphon withdrawal reflex (GSWR) ==
A two-component reflex is triggered when a weak or moderate stimulus is applied to the siphon or the mantle shelf. These two components consist of two reflex acts, the siphon-withdrawal reflex and the gill-withdrawal reflex. Together they form a reflex pattern with short latency which protects the animal's gill and siphon from potentially threatening stimuli.

Both central ganglia and peripheral neurons are often involved in the neural control of behavior in molluscs. In molluscs such as Aplysia californica the peripheral motor neurons are more extensive, as opposed to vertebrates, and innervate somatic (locomotor and appendageal) muscles. Central pathways are activated by weak stimuli applied at some distance from the target effector structure and peripheral pathways are activated when the stimuli is applied at a distance or directly on the target effector structure.

A stimulus to the siphon (weak or moderate) is mediated by abdominal ganglion (55%) and by peripheral motor neurons (45%) and is activated simultaneously.

By using preparations of Aplysia californica six central motor neurons have been found in the abdominal ganglion that produce movements of the gill. Stimulation of the cells named L7, LD_{G1}, LD_{G2} and RD_{G} results in large gill contractions and stimulation of L9_{G1} and L9_{G2} produces smaller contractions.

In the abdominal ganglion has seven central motor neurons been found that also produce movements of the siphon. LD_{S1}, LD_{S2}, LD_{S3}, RD_{S}, LB_{S1}, LB_{S2}, and LB_{S3} control contraction and constriction of the siphon. The siphon is additionally innervated by about 30 peripheral motor neurons.

Kandel and colleagues used preparations of Aplysia californica where individuals were restrained in small aquariums in a manner that the gill was exposed. A tactile stimulus was administered to the siphon and elicited the gill and siphon withdrawal reflex. A photocell was placed under the gill to record amplitude and duration of the response elicited by the stimulus.

Habituation was observed when the stimulus was delivered repeatedly to the siphon. Stimulus every 90 seconds resulted in a rapidly declined response. By delivering an electric shock to the tail the response was rapidly restored, and dishabituation occurred. Sensitization was observed when a strong stimulus was administered to the tail, thus enhancing a completely rested reflex in Aplysia californica.
