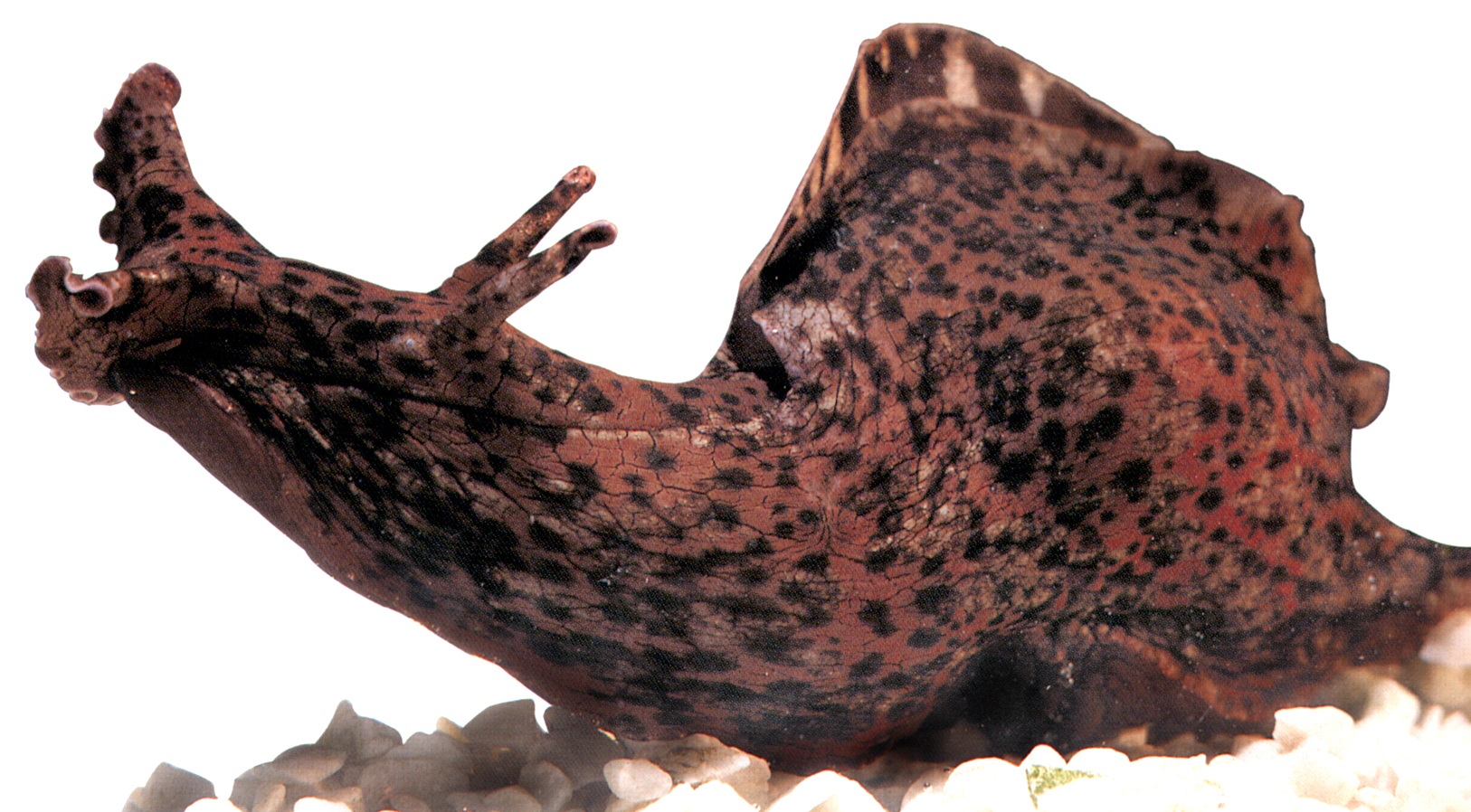

Scientific classification
- Kingdom: Animalia
- Phylum: Mollusca
- Class: Gastropoda
- Order: Aplysiida
- Family: Aplysiidae
- Genus: Aplysia
- Species: A. californica

Binomial name
- Aplysia californica (James Graham Cooper, 1863)
- Occurrence is sparse in the northern portion of this range

Synonyms
- List: Aplysia (Neaplysia) nettiae Winkler, 1959; Aplysia (Varria) californica J. G. Cooper, 1863; Aplysia rehderi Eales, 1960; Aplysia ritteri T. D. A. Cockerell, 1902; Aplysia robertsi Pilsbry, 1895; Tethys (Neaplysia) californica J. G. Cooper, 1863; Tethys (Neaplysia) ritteri D. A. Cockerell, 1901; Tethys californicus J. G. Cooper, 1863; Tethys robertsi Pilsbry, 1895

= California sea hare =

Species of gastropod

The California sea hare (Aplysia californica) is a species of sea slug in the sea hare family, Aplysiidae.

== Distribution ==
A. californica is found along the coast of California, the United States, and northwestern Mexico (including the Gulf of California). Aplysia species inhabit the photic zone to graze on algae, mainly the intertidal, usually not deeper than 18–20 m (59–66 ft).

== Description ==
The maximum length recorded for the California sea hare is 75 cm (30 in) when crawling, thus fully extended, although most adult specimens are half this size or smaller. Adult animals can weigh up to 7 kg (15 lb). A closely related species, Aplysia vaccaria, the black sea hare, can grow larger still.

Original description:

The animal's coloration ranges from pale gray to greenish, transitioning to purplish on its sides. The mantle folds are adorned with scattered white specks, from which an irregular network of brown lines extends across the remainder of the body, interspersed with large brown blotches. The inner surface of the mantle is distinctively patterned with alternating, interlocking bars of white and dark brown. The sole of the foot is black. The eyes are very minute and black.

The shell, embedded within the cartilaginous substance of the mantle, is translucent and exhibits a trapezoidal or hatchet shape. Its margins are rounded, and the dorsal surface is slightly convex. In older specimens, the nucleus (or center) is positioned distantly from the posterior end or apex. Faint radiating lines diverge from the nucleus, intersected by an irregular network of darker lines. All these lines terminate abruptly at a distance from the shell's margin, thus creating a wide, nearly transparent border. An accessory plate, spatulate in form and slightly raised, originates from the nucleus on the shell's inner surface.

A California sea hare is typically reddish-brown to greenish-brown, but the color varies based on the algae it ingests. Each sea hare houses four tentacles, with two on the head sheltering the eyes, and two on the face surrounding the mouth. The body has two folds, called parapodia, which envelop the gills for protection but enable water to get by. Below the body is a muscle that allows mobility, almost like a foot. The California sea hare also has an internal shell to protect its organs.

== Lifecycle ==
Like all sea hares, the California sea hare is hermaphroditic, simultaneously acting as male and female during mating. A. californica is known to form mating chains with up to 20 animals. The eggs are yellow-green, and change after 8–9 days into a brown color before larvae hatch. Mating is most prominent during the summer following water temperature rise to 17°C.

A. californica has a generation time of 19 weeks: Days 1-37 after hatching from the egg comprise the planktonic stage, days 34-37 are the metamorphic stage, and days 45-80 are the juvenile stage. At about day 30, the larvae move on from the planktonic stage and begin to roost on algae, typically red algae. The larvae eat enough to double their weight every 10 days for the following 3 months while they undergo metamorphosis. Reproductive maturity is reached 85 days after hatching (133 days after deposition of the fertilized eggs). The development of the nervous system lasts for 140 days. Often, the California sea hare dies shortly after laying eggs. Cooler temperatures (14-25°C, or 57-77°F) delay spawning and have been shown to extend the lifespan.

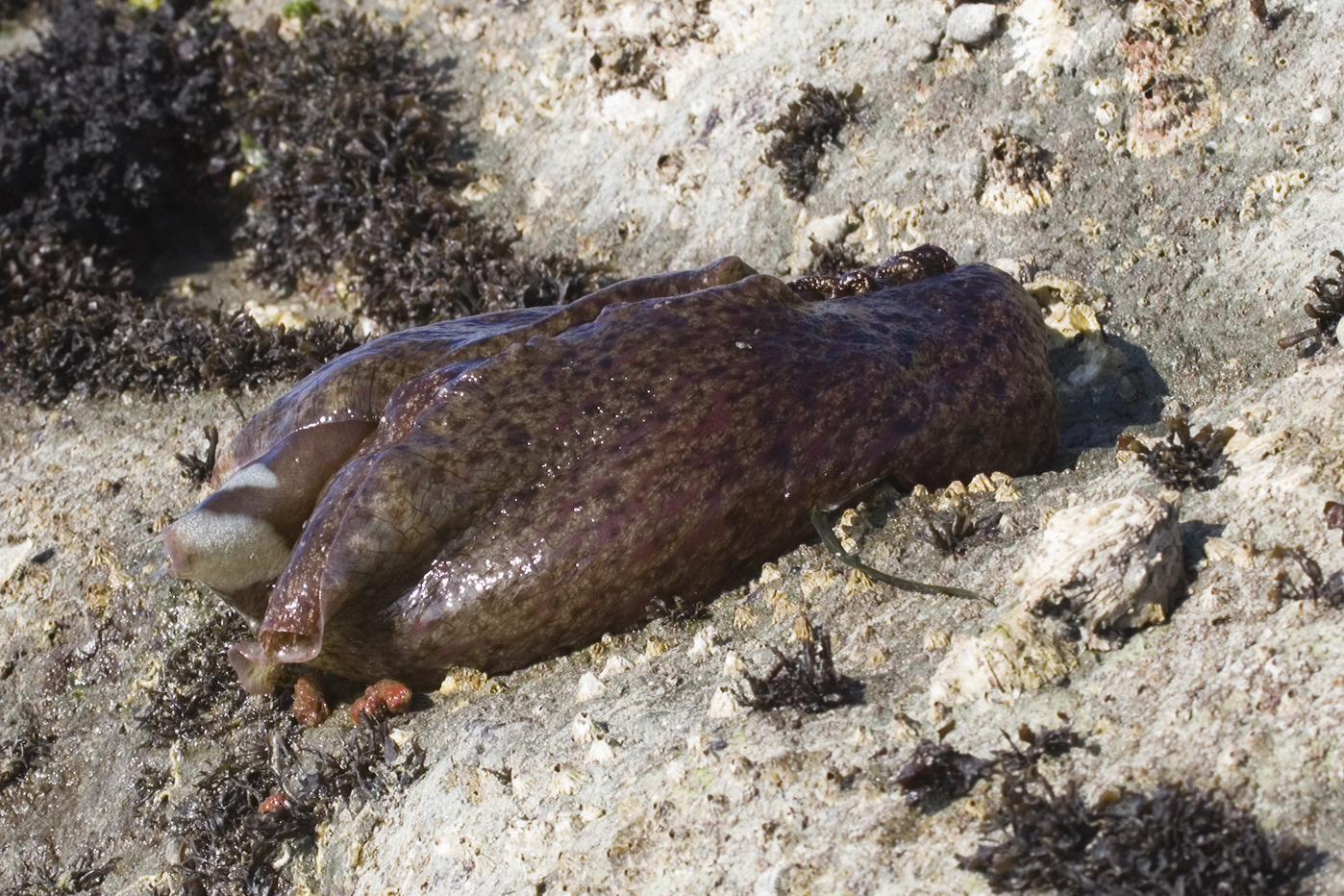
Out of water at low tide near Morro Bay

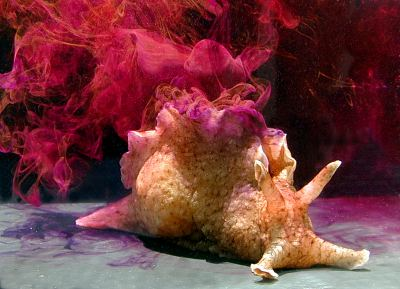
Releasing ink after being disturbed

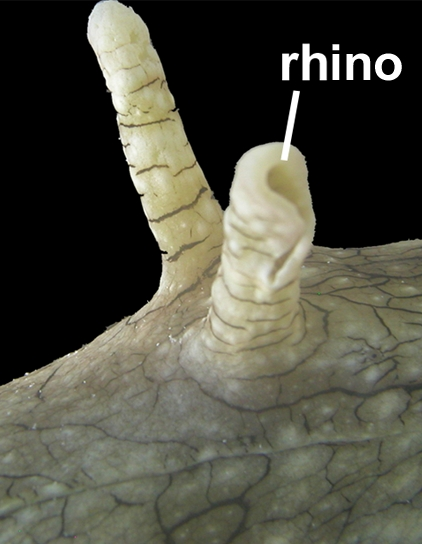
A. californica rhinophore

A. californica at Monterey Bay Aquarium. Video clip

== Sexual reproduction ==
At the base of the right anterior tentacle is the aperture from which the penis can protrude. The genital aperture lies at the anterior end of the mantle cavity, a seminal grove arises from it and runs forward to the penis, at the base of the anterior tentacle.

Coupling lasts for hours or sometimes for days, although the actual passage of the sperm may take only a few minutes. Egg laying normally has to be triggered by copulation, but it occurs spontaneously in individuals kept in isolation for up to 3–4 months (typically these eggs are unfertilized). Copulation occurs most frequently in the early morning, and rarely after 12:30 pm. An individual animal weighing 2,600 g was recorded to have laid about 500 million eggs at 27 separate times during less than five months.

== Feeding habits ==
Like all Aplysia species, the California sea hare is herbivorous. Its diet consists primarily of red algae such as Laurencia pacifica, Plocamium pacificum, and Ceramium eatonianum, which give the animal its typically reddish or pinkish coloration. Some California sea hares will appear browner, which helps them blend into their surroundings. A. californica resembles the food on which it grazes, and cannot be distinguished easily from the seaweed unless the animal is moving. When the sea hares eat algae, they consume toxins, which they store in themselves to repel predators. They can also release these toxins as a purple ink, which will also discourage predators from attacking them.

== Predators ==
Because of the toxins in its body that come from consuming algae, the California sea hare has very few predators. Predators include starfish, lobsters, and the ophistobranch Navanax inermis which will take juveniles.

When it is considerably disturbed, the sea hare is capable of releasing two different kinds of ink from different locations within its mantle cavity, much in the way an octopus does. One ink is reddish-purple and comes from what is called the purple ink gland, while the other is milky white, comes from what is called the opaline gland, and contains the aversive chemical opaline.

=== Protective mechanisms ===
Inking provides protection from spiny lobsters, a major predator of sea hares, by means of three mechanisms: chemical deterrence, sensory disruption, and phagomimicry.

The typical defence response of the sea hare to a predator is the release of chemicals such as free amino acids, ink from the ink gland, and opaline from the opaline gland. Chemical deterrence involves the release of toxic chemicals that are noxious to predators and rapidly dissuades them from feeding. Ink creates a dark, diffuse cloud in the water that disrupts the sensory perception of the predator by acting as a screen or decoy. The opaline, which affects the senses dealing with feeding, causes the predator to instinctively attack the cloud of chemicals as if it were indeed food.

== Laboratory use ==
A. californica has become a valuable laboratory animal, used in studies of the neurobiology of learning and memory, and is especially associated with the work of Nobel laureate Eric Kandel.

Its ubiquity in synaptic plasticity studies can be attributed to its simple nervous system, consisting of just 20,000 large, easily identified neurons with cell bodies up to 1 mm in size. Despite its seemingly simple nervous system, though, A. californica is capable of a variety of nonassociative and associative learning tasks, including sensitization, habituation, and classical and operant conditioning. Study typically involves a reduced preparation of the gill and siphon withdrawal reflex.

Sequencing of its whole genome was approved as a priority by National Human Genome Research Institute in March 2005. The draft genome is available on the UCSC Genome browser.
