= Dishabituation =

Dishabituation (or dehabituation) is a form of recovered or restored behavioral response wherein the reaction towards a known stimulus is enhanced, as opposed to habituation. Initially, it was proposed as an explanation to increased response for a habituated behavior by introducing an external stimulus; however, upon further analysis, some have suggested that a proper analysis of dishabituation should be taken into consideration only when the response is increased by implying the original stimulus.

Based on studies conducted over habituation's dual-process theory which attributed towards dishabituation, it is also determined that the latter was independent of any behavioral sensitization.

== History ==
The phenomenon was studied by an early scientist Samuel Jackson Holmes in 1912, while he was studying the animal behavior in sea urchins. Later in 1933, George Humphrey—while studying the same effects in human babies and extensively over lower vertebrates—argued that dishabituation is in fact the removal of habituation altogether, to a behavior that was not conditioned to begin with.

== Mechanism ==
=== In humans ===
According to the dual-process theory of habituation, dishabituation is characterized by an increase in responding to a habituated stimulus after introducing a deviant, to sensitize a change in arousal. For example, when hearing the ticking of a clock and the clock makes a louder ticking sound, you pay more attention to the clock even though you are already familiar with a clock. Further investigations into elicitation and habituation of the electrodermal orienting reflex also showed that dishabituation is independent of sensitization for indifferent stimuli.

A meta-analysis shows that dishabituation is improvised on preterm infants as compared to term infants based on the magnitude of stimulus sensitized.

==== Biological basis ====
As per the Center for Neural Engineering, University of Southern California (Los Angeles), the primordial hippocampus plays an important role in modeling the dishabituation of behavioral response. According to this, the interaction of two processes is dynamically postulated based on synaptic plasticity, which acquires both long and short-term forgetting. Along with that, cumulative shrinking is proposed to map responses from the temporal region of the anterior thalamus that references the spatial positions. The plasticity model combined with the structure of medial pallium model provides a structured network of neural mechanisms, contributing towards dishabituation and habituation alike.

Accordingly, this phenomenon is neither indicative to counteract the emphasis of an existing habituation but instead, organizes an independent neuronal process, nor resulted by facilitation, as the etymology may indicate.

=== In animals ===
- Studies done on the Aplysia to establish dishabituation or superimposed sensitization, to understand their neuronal mechanisms of their gill-withdrawal reflex, and dishabituation processes to establish large-scale methodology to solve major limitation problem.
- The Tritonia diomedea for its escape swim (the number of cycles per swim) and the Drosophila melanogaster
- Auditory stimulation to understand the escape behavior in hermit crabs
- Exercise as a dishabituating stimulus on hypoglycemic rodents

All the above establish the process of dishabituation, where responding to a repetitive stimulus increases and has been documented in a wide range of organisms - from single-celled animals to primates - which is thought to allow an organism to reflexively either filter out or consider, all forms of information.

It is also characterized as an emancipation of an existing prey-catching behavior. Sometimes however, the inconsistency in dishabituation of behavioral response is brought-on by mismatch between the 1st and 2nd stimuli, which in-turn is due to the occurrence of inhibition by habituation, to the existing stimulus.

== Application ==
Dishabituation shows an increase in reward effectiveness as it produces a heightened behavioral response to sensitization of arousal. Other studies also show that it is caused by mind-wandering, where with distributed working process as opposed to practising in mass, the learning behavior is enhanced.

In the development of preterm infants, the dishabituation process also provides with an approach for the early diagnosis of cognitive status and most importantly, their mental faculties performances.

== See also ==
- Adaptive behaviors
- Operant conditioning
- Perceptual learning
- Reinforcement
