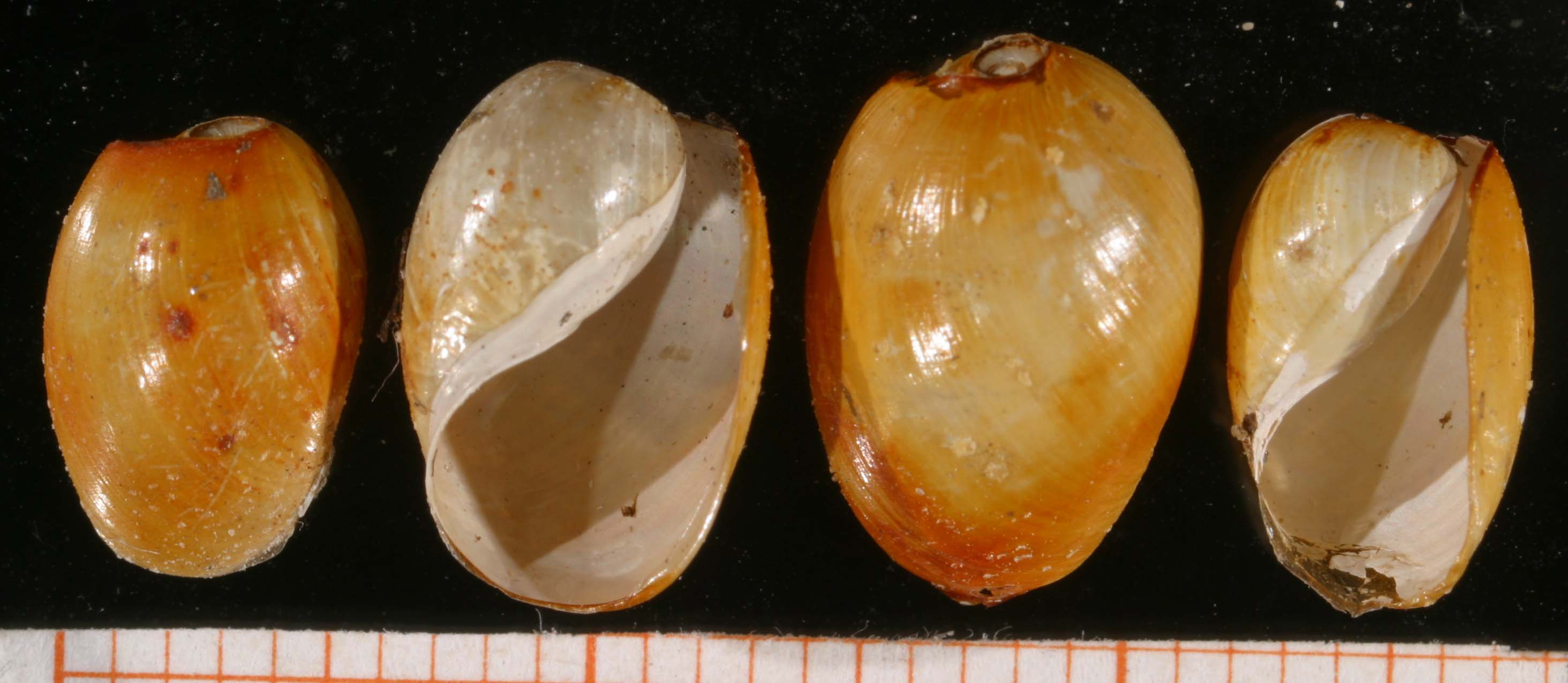
- shells of Akera bullata

Scientific classification
- Kingdom: Animalia
- Phylum: Mollusca
- Class: Gastropoda
- Order: Aplysiida
- Superfamily: Akeroidea
- Family: Akeridae; Mazzarelli, 1891

Genera
- See text

= Akeridae =

Family of gastropods

Akeridae is a small taxonomic family of sea snails, marine gastropod molluscs belonging to the superfamily Akeroidea, the sea hares. The family, in its original spelling "Aceridae", has previously been attributed in error to Pilsbry, 1893.

Akeridae is the only family in the superfamily.

== Genera ==
The only genus of the family is:

- Genus Akera O. F. Müller, 1776 - type genus
