= Akeroidea =

Scientific classification
- Kingdom: Animalia
- Phylum: Mollusca
- Class: Gastropoda
- Subclass: Heterobranchia
- Infraclass: Euthyneura
- Subterclass: Tectipleura
- Order: Aplysiida
- Superfamily: Akeroidea; Mazzarelli, 1891

Families
- See text

Superfamily of gastropods

Akeroidea is a superfamily of sea snails, marine gastropod mollusks within the clade Anaspidea.

Akeridae is the only family in this superfamily.
