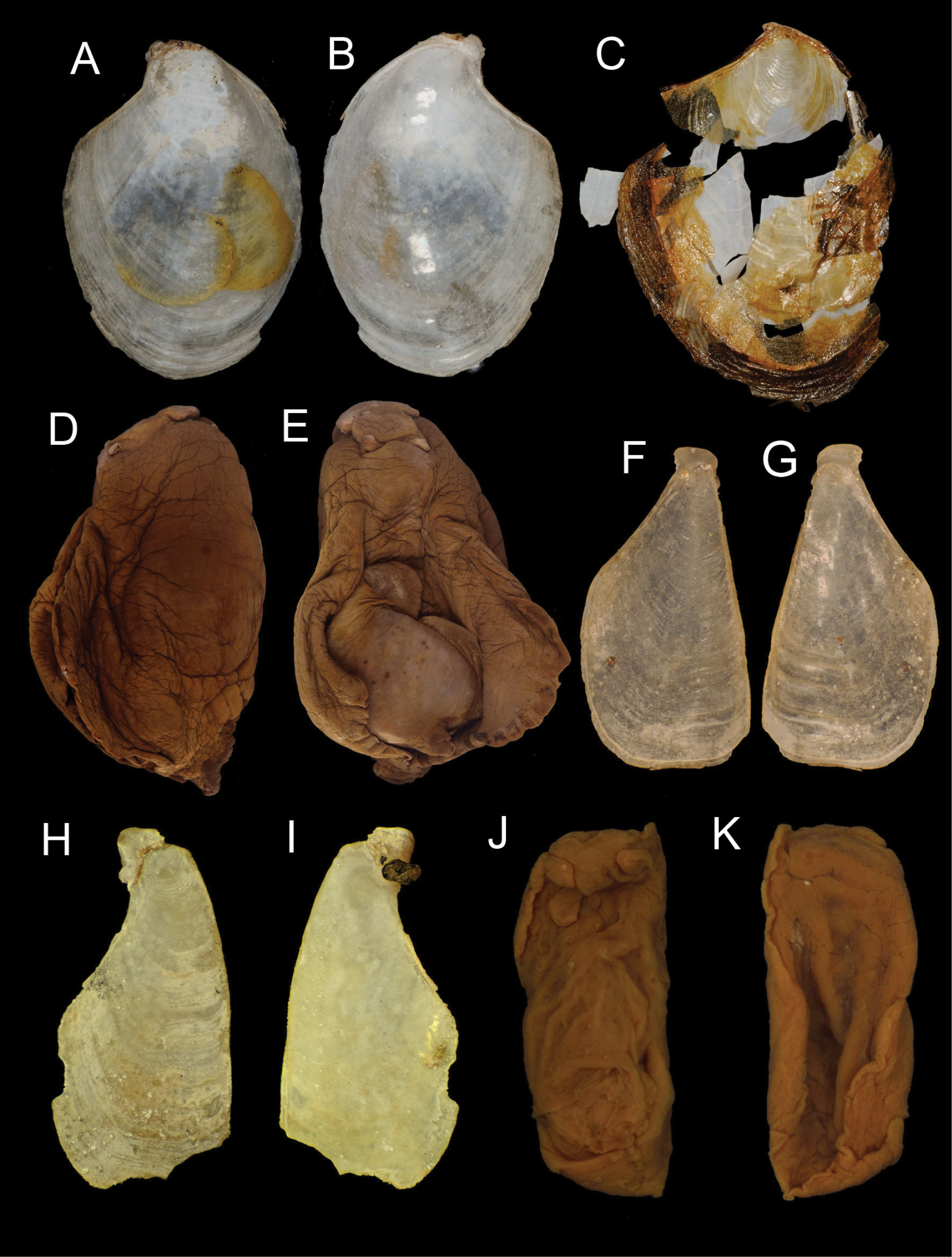
- Aplysiida type specimens
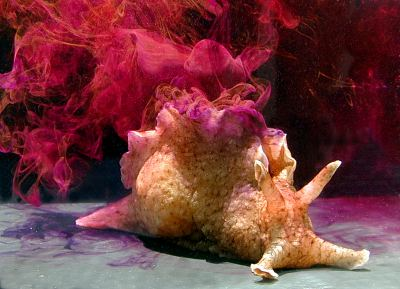
- Aplysia californica, a typical sea hare displaying inking behavior

Scientific classification
- Kingdom: Animalia
- Phylum: Mollusca
- Class: Gastropoda
- Subclass: Heterobranchia
- Infraclass: Euthyneura
- Subterclass: Tectipleura
- Order: Aplysiida; P. Fischer, 1883

Families
- Superfamily Akeroidea; Akeridae; Superfamily Aplysioidea; Aplysiidae

Synonyms
- Anaspidea; Aplysiomorpha

= Aplysiida =

Order of gastropods

The order Aplysiida, commonly known as sea hares (Aplysia species and related genera), are medium-sized to very large opisthobranch gastropod molluscs with a soft internal shell made of protein. These are marine gastropod molluscs in the superfamilies Aplysioidea and Akeroidea.

The common name "sea hare" is a direct translation from Latin: lepus marinus, as the animal's existence was known in Roman times. The name derives from their rounded shape and from the two long rhinophores that project upward from their heads and that somewhat resemble the ears of a hare.

== Taxonomy ==
Many older textbooks and websites refer to this suborder as "Aplysiida". The original author Paul Henri Fischer described the taxon Aplysiida at unspecified rank above family. In 1925 Johannes Thiele established the taxon Aplysiida as a suborder.

=== 2005 taxonomy ===
Since the taxon Aplysiida was not based on an existing genus, this name is no longer available according to the rules of the ICZN. Aplysiida has been replaced in the new Taxonomy of the Gastropoda (Bouchet & Rocroi, 2005) by the clade Aplysiomorpha.

The scientific name for the order in which they used to be classified, the Aplysiida, is derived from the Greek for "without a shield" and refers to the lack of the characteristic head shield found in the cephalaspidean opisthobranchs. Many Aplysiidans have only a thin, internal and much-reduced shell with a small mantle cavity; some have no shell at all. All species have a radula and gizzard plates.

=== 2010 taxonomy ===
Jörger et al. (2010) have moved this taxon (named as Aplysiida) to Euopisthobranchia.

=== 2017 taxonomy ===
The name "Aplysiomorpha" was preferred by Bouchet and Rocroi (2005) over "Aplysiida Fischer", 1883, but the authors now agree that there is a consistent usage for Aplysiida in the recent literature and that the older name must be preferred.

== Description ==
Sea hares are mostly rather large, bulky creatures when adults. Juveniles are mainly unobserved on the shoreline. The biggest species, Aplysia vaccaria, can reach a length of 99 centimetres (39 in) and a weight of 14 kilograms (31 lb) and is arguably the largest gastropod species.

Sea hares have soft bodies with an internal shell, and like all opisthobranch molluscs, they are hermaphroditic. Unlike many other gastropods, they are more or less bilaterally symmetrical in their external appearance. The foot has lateral projections, or "parapodia".

== Life habits ==
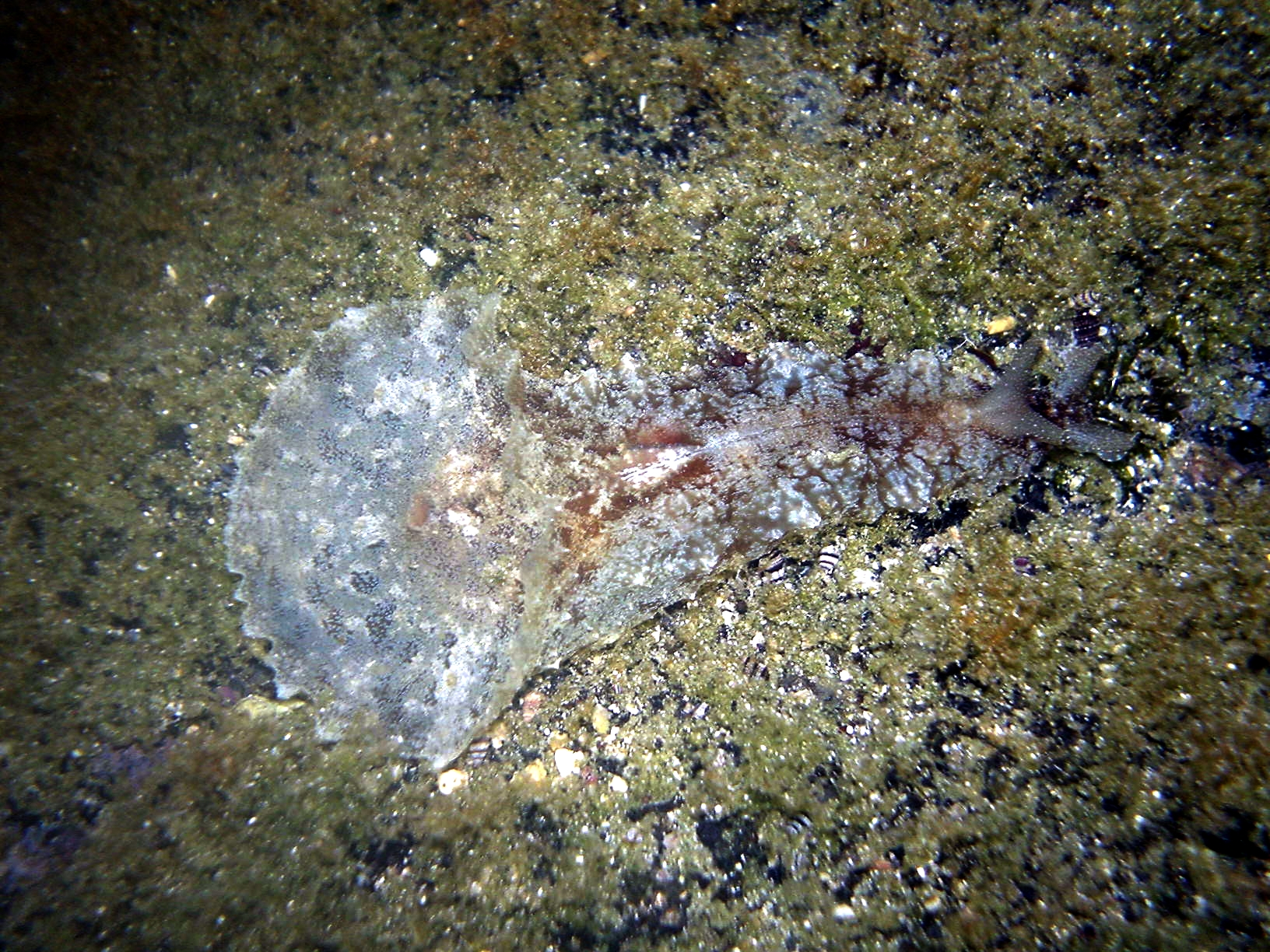
Sea hare Dolabella auricularia at Big Island of Hawaii

Sea hares are herbivorous, and are typically found on seaweed in shallow water. Some young sea hares seemingly are capable of burrowing in soft sediment, leaving only their rhinophores and mantle opening showing. Sea hares have an extremely good sense of smell. They can follow even the faintest scent using their rhinophores, which are extremely sensitive chemoreceptors.

Their color corresponds with the color of the seaweed they eat: red sea hares have been feeding on red seaweed. This camouflages them from predators. When disturbed, a sea hare can release ink from its ink glands, providing a fluid, smoke-like toxic screen, adversely affecting its predators' olfactory senses while acting as a powerful deterrent. The toxic ink may be white, purple, or red, depending on the pigments in their seaweed food source and lightens in color as it spreads, diluted by seawater. Their skin contains a similar toxin that renders sea hares largely inedible to many predators. In addition to the colored ink, sea hares can secrete a clear slime akin to that released defensively by hagfish which physically plugs the olfactory receptors of predators like lobsters.

Some sea hares can employ turbo jet propulsion as a locomotion and others move like stingrays but with greater fluttering fluidity in their jelly-like "wings". In the moving marine environment and without the sophisticated cognitive machinery of the cephalopods, their motion appears to be somewhat erratic, but they do reach their goals, such as the seabed, according to the wave-action, currents, or calmness of their area.

== Human use ==
Sea hares are consumed in several parts of the world.

In Hawaii, sea hares, or kualakai, are typically cooked in an imu wrapped in ti leaves.

In coastal areas in the Visayas and Mindanao islands in the Philippines, long strands of eggs of the wedge sea hare (Dolabella auricularia, locally known as donsol or dongsul in the Visayan languages) are traditionally eaten. The egg strands are known as lokot or lukot and are harvested from shallow rocks and seagrass meadows. They resemble twisted noodles (pancit) in appearance and texture, hence why they are also called pansit-pansitan ("mock noodles") in some areas. They are usually green, but can be reddish to yellowish in color. They are often mistaken for seaweed and have a taste described as salty and sweet. They are usually eaten raw with vinegar and spices as kinilaw, sauteed like pancit guisado, or added to soups like fish tinola.

Egg masses of sea hares are also similarly eaten in Samoa, Kiribati, and Fiji.

Aplysia californica is a species of sea hare noteworthy for its use in studies of the neurobiology of learning and memory, due to its unusually large axons. It is especially associated with the work of Nobel Laureate Eric Kandel. Research surrounding the aplysia gill and siphon withdrawal reflex may be of particular interest with respect to this.

== Gallery ==
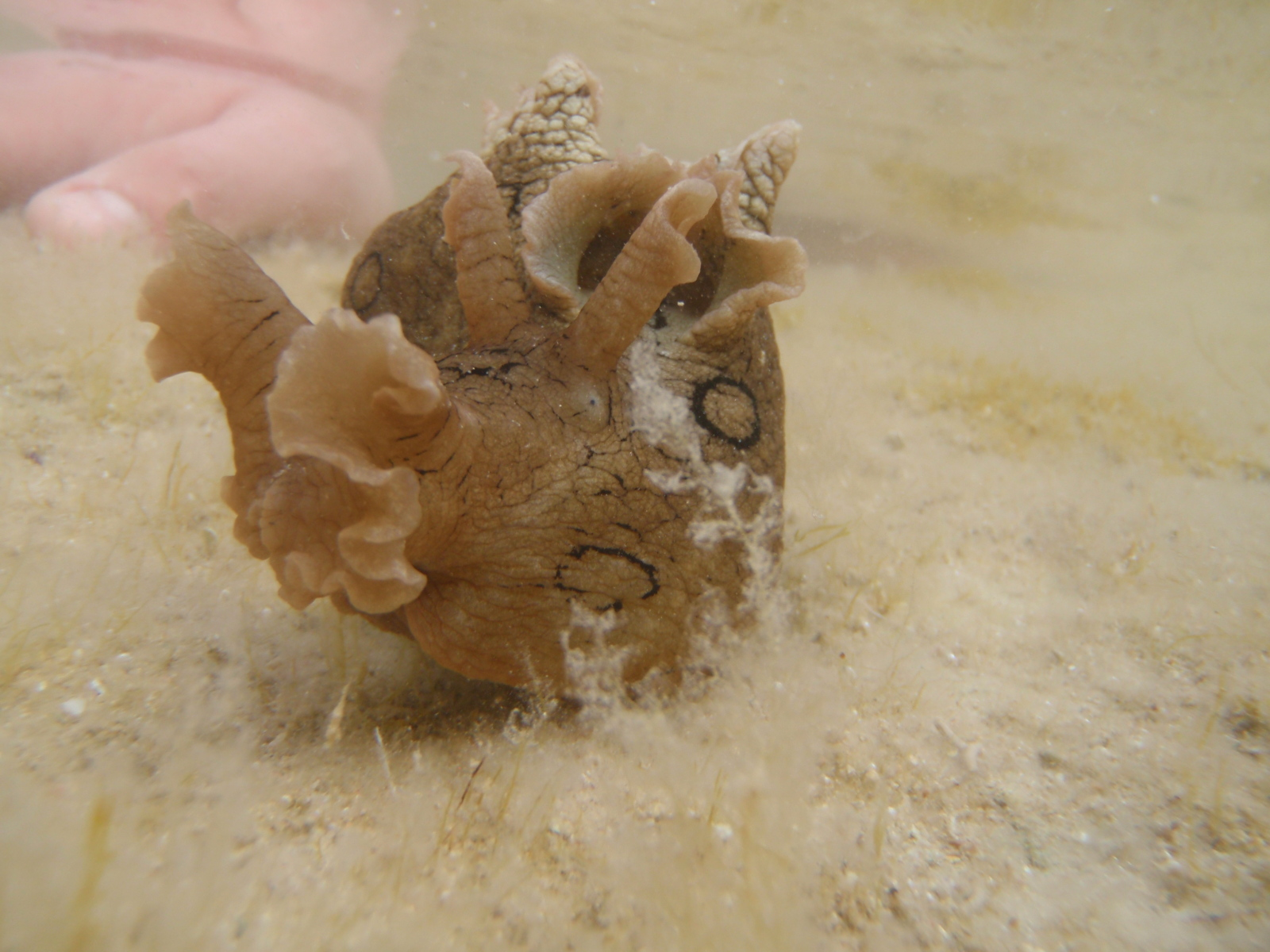
Sea hare Aplysia dactylomela

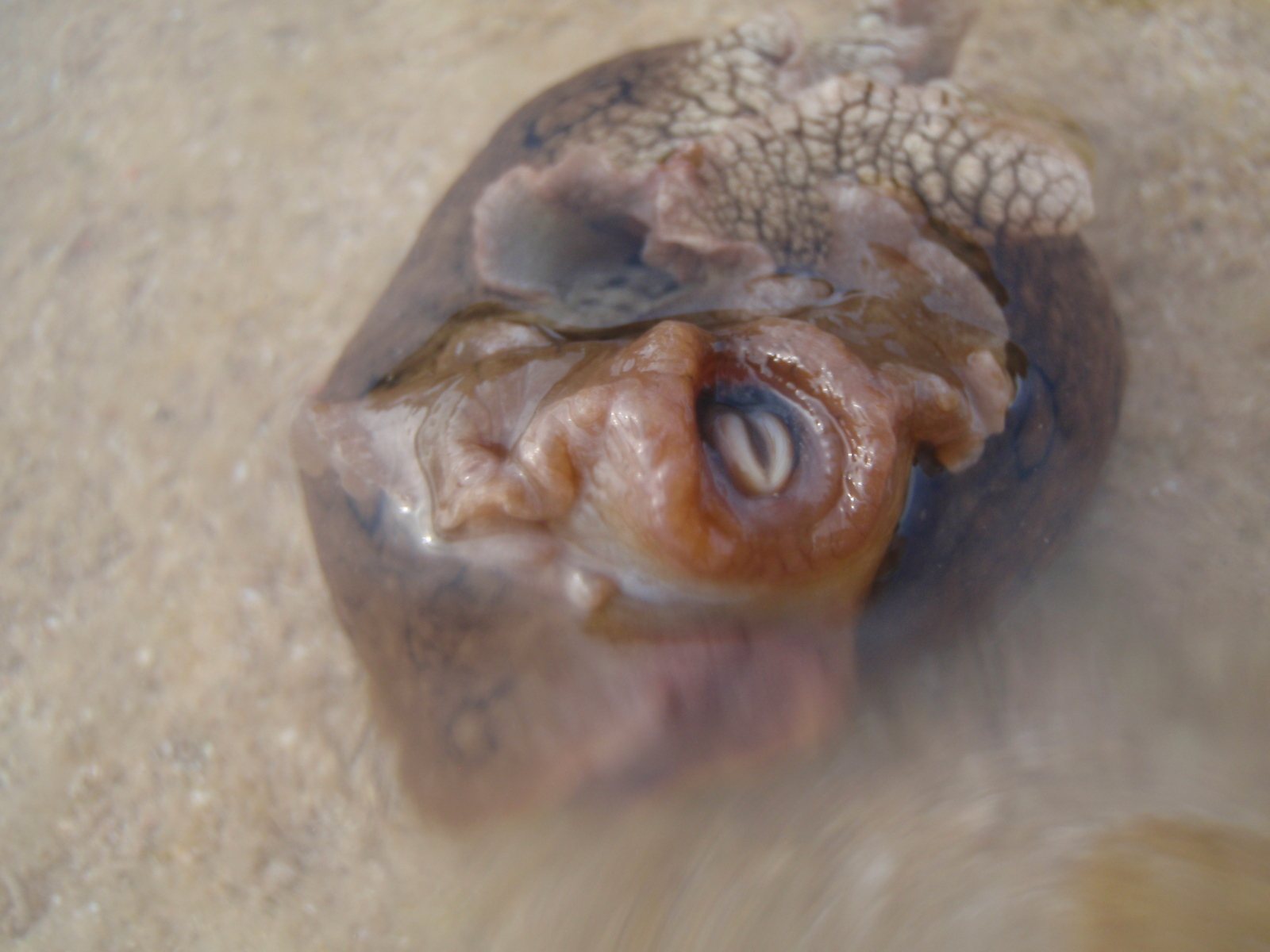
Aplysia dactylomela showing mouth
